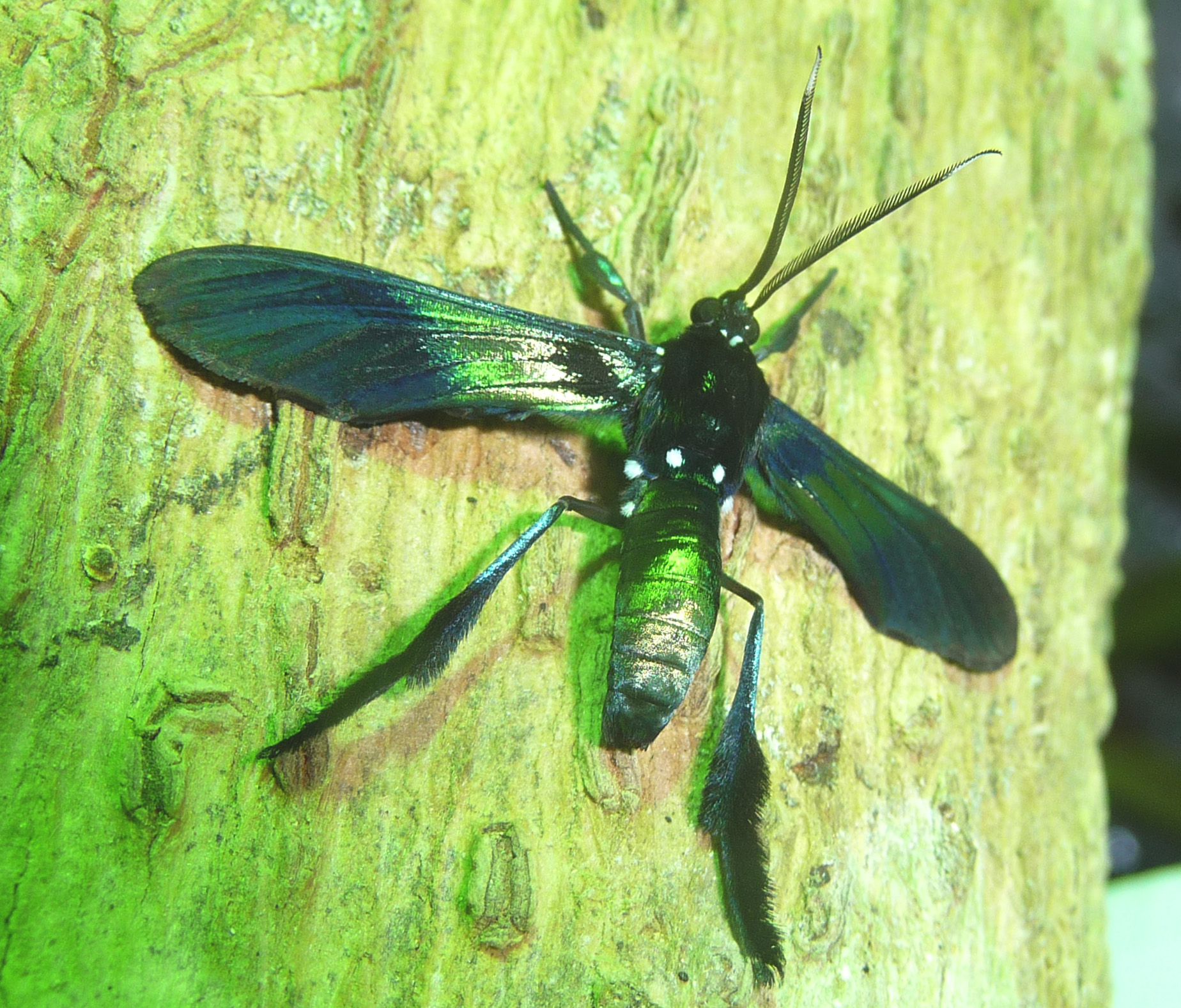
- Macrocneme chrysitis

Scientific classification
- Kingdom: Animalia
- Phylum: Arthropoda
- Clade: Pancrustacea
- Class: Insecta
- Order: Lepidoptera
- Superfamily: Noctuoidea
- Family: Erebidae
- Subfamily: Arctiinae
- Tribe: Arctiini
- Subtribe: Euchromiina; Butler, 1876

= Euchromiina =

Subtribe of moths

The Euchromiina are a subtribe of tiger moths in the family Erebidae. It was described by Arthur Gardiner Butler in 1876. Many species in the subtribe are mimics of wasps. Euchromiina have always been considered closely related to the sister subtribe Ctenuchina due to their similarity to beetles and wasps. These two subtribes make up around 3,000 valid species, the majority of which occur in the Neotropics.

== Taxonomy ==
The subtribe was previously classified as the tribe Euchromiini of the subfamily Ctenuchinae of the family Arctiidae.

== Genera ==
The following genera are included in the subtribe.

- Aclytia
- Antichloris
- Anycles
- Apeplopoda
- Argyroeides
- Ceramidia
- Chrostosoma
- Chrysocale
- Coreura
- Correbia
- Correbidia
- Cosmosoma
- Cyanopepla
- Dasysphinx
- Delphyre
- Didasys
- Dinia
- Diospage
- Diptilon
- Dycladia
- Empyreuma
- Epidesma
- Episcepsis
- Erruca
- Eucereon
- Euchromia
- Gymnelia
- Holophaea
- Homoeocera
- Horama
- Hyaleucerea
- Hyalomis
- Hyperphara
- Isanthrene
- Leucotmemis
- Loxophlebia
- Lymire
- Macrocneme
- Mallodeta
- Mesothen
- Mevania
- Myrmecopsis
- Nelphe
- Nyridela
- Paraethria
- Pheia
- Phoenicoprocta
- Poliopastea
- Pompilioides
- Pseudocharis
- Pseudohyaleucerea
- Pseudosphex
- Psilopleura
- Psoloptera
- Rhynchopyga
- Saurita
- Scena
- Sphecosoma
- Syntomeida
- Uranophora
- Valvaminor
