= Hyalomis hypochryseis =

Scientific classification
- Kingdom: Animalia
- Phylum: Arthropoda
- Class: Insecta
- Order: Lepidoptera
- Superfamily: Noctuoidea
- Family: Erebidae
- Subfamily: Arctiinae
- Tribe: Arctiini
- Subtribe: Euchromiina
- Genus: Hyalomis
- Species: H. hypochryseis

Binomial name
- Hyalomis hypochryseis (Hampson, 1898)

Synonyms
- Desmidocnemis hypochryseis Hampson, 1898

Species of moth

Hyalomis hypochryseis is a moth of the subfamily Arctiinae. It was described by George Hampson in 1898. It is found in São Paulo, Brazil.
