= Hyalomis platyleuca =

Scientific classification
- Kingdom: Animalia
- Phylum: Arthropoda
- Class: Insecta
- Order: Lepidoptera
- Superfamily: Noctuoidea
- Family: Erebidae
- Subfamily: Arctiinae
- Tribe: Arctiini
- Subtribe: Euchromiina
- Genus: Hyalomis
- Species: H. platyleuca

Binomial name
- Hyalomis platyleuca (Walker, 1854)

Synonyms
- Glaucopis platyleuca Walker, 1854; Desmidocnemis platyleuca Hampson, 1898

Species of moth

Hyalomis platyleuca is a species of moth in the subfamily Arctiinae. It was described by Francis Walker in 1854. It is found in Venezuela.
