= Scena =

- Scena (moth), genus of moths in the subfamily Arctiinae.
- Scena, Italian name for the comune (municipality) of Schenna in South Tyrol in northern Italy,
- Scena, a sequence in an aria
