= Diptilon proleuca =

Scientific classification
- Domain: Eukaryota
- Kingdom: Animalia
- Phylum: Arthropoda
- Class: Insecta
- Order: Lepidoptera
- Superfamily: Noctuoidea
- Family: Erebidae
- Subfamily: Arctiinae
- Genus: Diptilon
- Species: D. proleuca

Binomial name
- Diptilon proleuca Druce, 1905

Species of moth

Diptilon proleuca is a moth of the subfamily Arctiinae. It was described by Druce in 1905. It is found in Venezuela.
