= Dasysphinx baroni =

Scientific classification
- Domain: Eukaryota
- Kingdom: Animalia
- Phylum: Arthropoda
- Class: Insecta
- Order: Lepidoptera
- Superfamily: Noctuoidea
- Family: Erebidae
- Subfamily: Arctiinae
- Genus: Dasysphinx
- Species: D. baroni

Binomial name
- Dasysphinx baroni Rothschild, 1910

Species of moth

Dasysphinx baroni is a moth of the subfamily Arctiinae. It was described by Rothschild in 1910. It is found in Ecuador.
