= Psoloptera locotmemica =

Scientific classification
- Kingdom: Animalia
- Phylum: Arthropoda
- Class: Insecta
- Order: Lepidoptera
- Superfamily: Noctuoidea
- Family: Erebidae
- Subfamily: Arctiinae
- Genus: Psoloptera
- Species: P. locotmemica

Binomial name
- Psoloptera locotmemica Bryk, 1953

Species of moth

Psoloptera locotmemica is a moth in the subfamily Arctiinae. It was described by Felix Bryk in 1953.
