= Nyridela xanthocera =

Scientific classification
- Kingdom: Animalia
- Phylum: Arthropoda
- Class: Insecta
- Order: Lepidoptera
- Superfamily: Noctuoidea
- Family: Erebidae
- Subfamily: Arctiinae
- Genus: Nyridela
- Species: N. xanthocera

Binomial name
- Nyridela xanthocera (Walker, 1856)

Synonyms
- Gymnelia xanthocera Walker, 1856

Species of moth

Nyridela xanthocera is a moth of the subfamily Arctiinae. It was described by Francis Walker in 1856. It is found in Mexico, Guatemala, Costa Rica and Panama.
