= Diptilon gladia =

Scientific classification
- Domain: Eukaryota
- Kingdom: Animalia
- Phylum: Arthropoda
- Class: Insecta
- Order: Lepidoptera
- Superfamily: Noctuoidea
- Family: Erebidae
- Subfamily: Arctiinae
- Genus: Diptilon
- Species: D. gladia

Binomial name
- Diptilon gladia E. D. Jones, 1914

Species of moth

Diptilon gladia is a moth of the subfamily Arctiinae. It was described by E. Dukinfield Jones in 1914. It is found in Brazil.

The wingspan is about 21 mm. The forewings are hyaline (glass like), with black veins and margins and a yellow spot at the base. The costal half of the hindwings is yellow with a black fascia below it. The inner area is hyaline with black margins.
