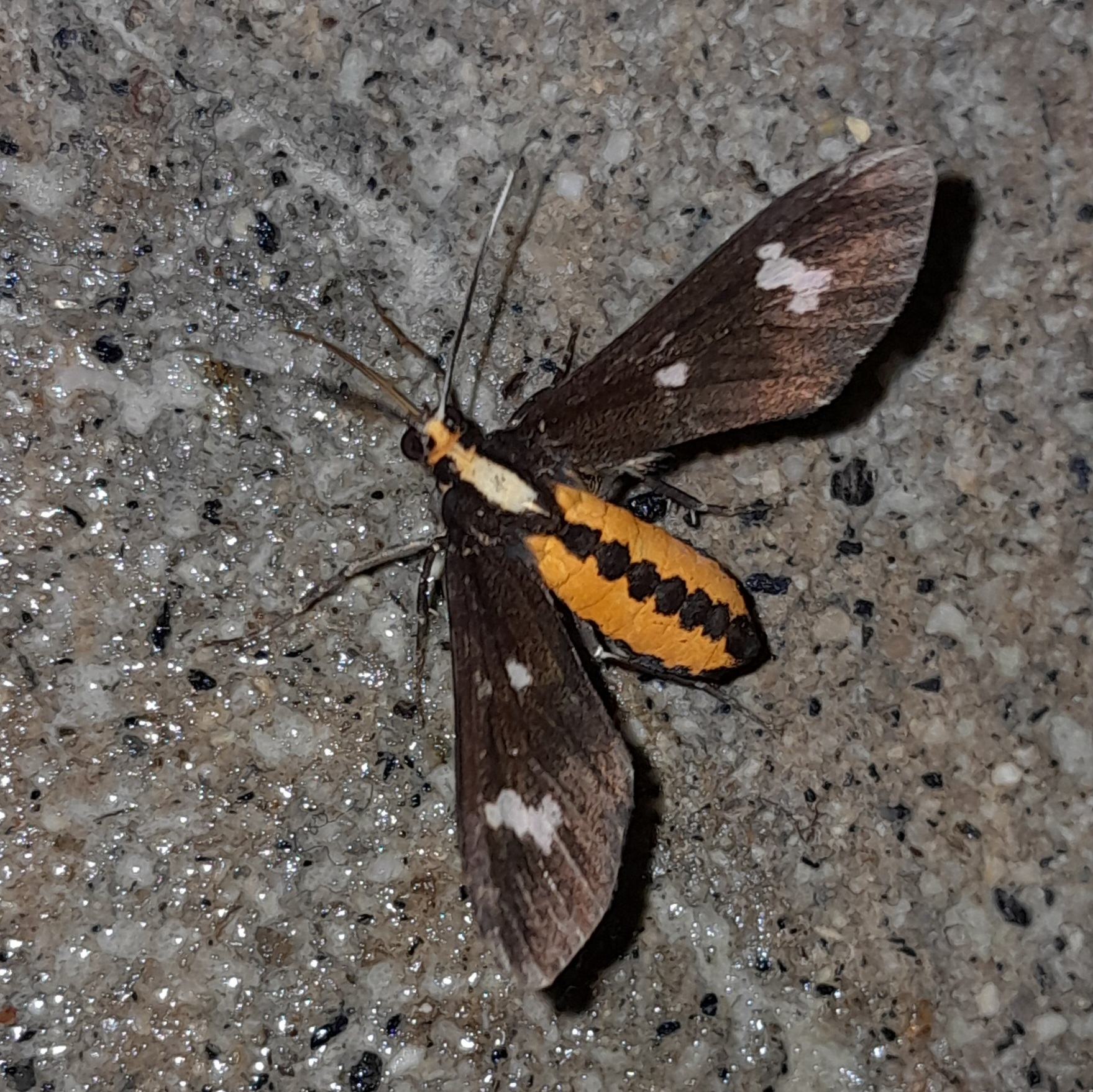
- Psilopleura klagesi

Scientific classification
- Kingdom: Animalia
- Phylum: Arthropoda
- Class: Insecta
- Order: Lepidoptera
- Superfamily: Noctuoidea
- Family: Erebidae
- Subfamily: Arctiinae
- Tribe: Arctiini
- Subtribe: Euchromiina
- Genus: Psilopleura; H. Druce, 1898

= Psilopleura =

Genus of moths

Psilopleura is a genus of tiger moths in the family Erebidae. The genus was erected by Herbert Druce in 1898.

== Species ==
- Psilopleura albipes Draudt, 1915
- Psilopleura dolens Schaus, 1911
- Psilopleura flavicans Dognin, 1911
- Psilopleura haemasoma (Curtis, 1812)
- Psilopleura klagesi Rothschild, 1911
- Psilopleura meridionalis (Zerny, 1931)
- Psilopleura pentheri Zerny, 1912
- Psilopleura polia H. Druce, 1898
- Psilopleura sanguiuncta Hampson, 1898
- Psilopleura scripta (Talbot, 1928)
- Psilopleura senana (Schaus, 1924)
- Psilopleura vitellina Draudt, 1931
- Psilopleura vittata (Walker, [1865])
