= Dycladia correbioides =

Scientific classification
- Domain: Eukaryota
- Kingdom: Animalia
- Phylum: Arthropoda
- Class: Insecta
- Order: Lepidoptera
- Superfamily: Noctuoidea
- Family: Erebidae
- Subfamily: Arctiinae
- Genus: Dycladia
- Species: D. correbioides

Binomial name
- Dycladia correbioides Felder, 1869

Synonyms
- Dycladia anduzei Lechy, 1943; Dycladia correbioides felderorum Bryk, 1953; Dycladia correbioides f. pseudocorrebioides Forster, 1949

Species of moth

Dycladia correbioides is a moth of the subfamily Arctiinae. It was described by Felder in 1869. It is found in Mexico, Guatemala, Costa Rica, Panama and Colombia.
