= Diptilon hoffmannsi =

Scientific classification
- Domain: Eukaryota
- Kingdom: Animalia
- Phylum: Arthropoda
- Class: Insecta
- Order: Lepidoptera
- Superfamily: Noctuoidea
- Family: Erebidae
- Subfamily: Arctiinae
- Genus: Diptilon
- Species: D. hoffmannsi

Binomial name
- Diptilon hoffmannsi Rothschild, 1911

Species of moth

Diptilon hoffmannsi is a moth of the subfamily Arctiinae. It was described by Rothschild in 1911. It is found in Peru.

The wingspan is about 28 mm. The forewings are hyaline, with black-brown veins and margins and slight fulvous yellow streaks on the subcostal nervure and above the inner margin. The postmedial part of the costa is whitish. The hindwings are hyaline with black-brown veins and margins.
