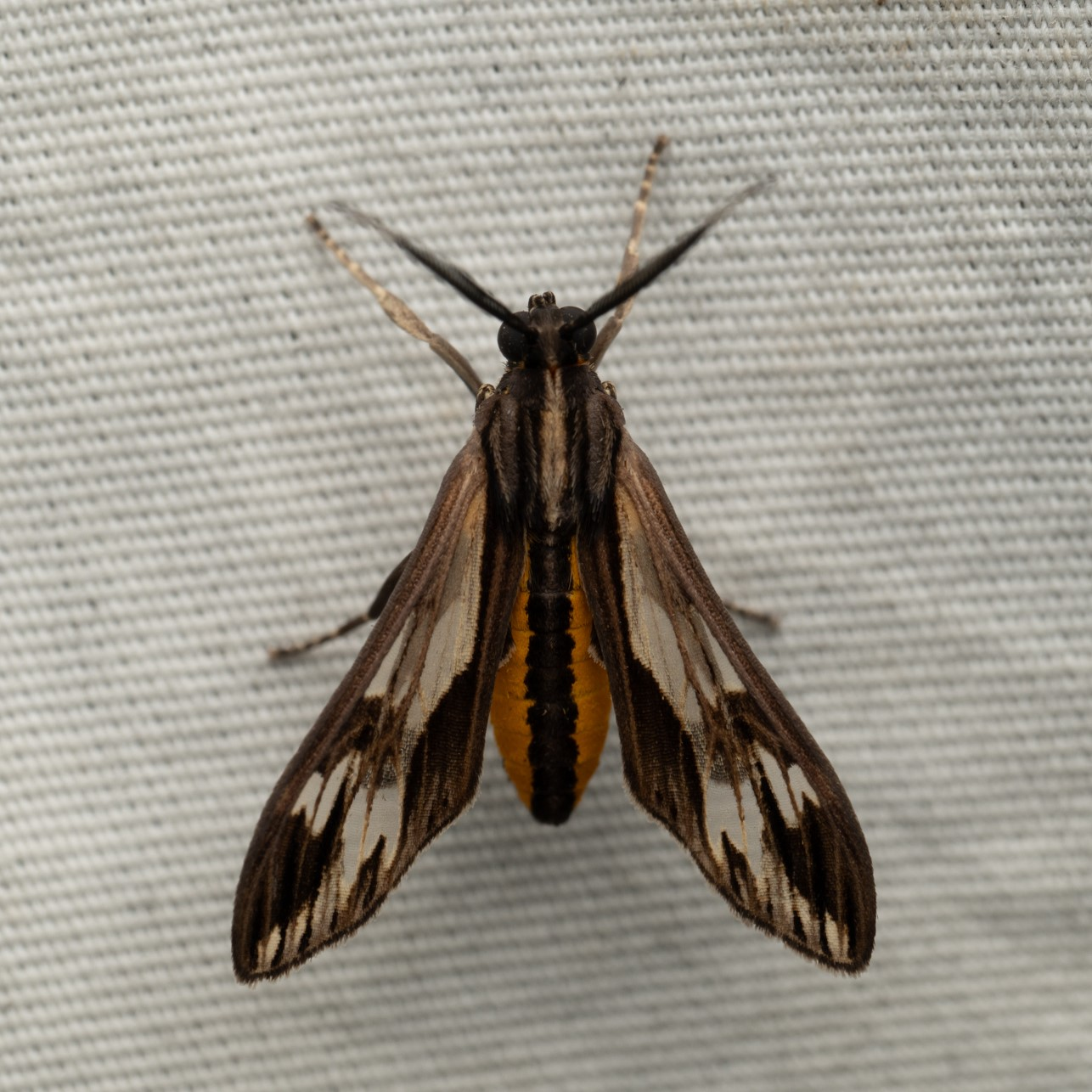

Scientific classification
- Kingdom: Animalia
- Phylum: Arthropoda
- Class: Insecta
- Order: Lepidoptera
- Superfamily: Noctuoidea
- Family: Erebidae
- Subfamily: Arctiinae
- Genus: Psilopleura
- Species: P. vittata

Binomial name
- Psilopleura vittata (Walker, [1865])

Synonyms
- Pheia vittata Walker, [1865]; Psilopleura vittatum

= Psilopleura vittata =

Species of moth

Psilopleura vittata is a species of moth in the subfamily Arctiinae. It was described by Francis Walker in 1865. It is found in Mexico, Guatemala and Belize.
