= Holophaea lugens =

Scientific classification
- Domain: Eukaryota
- Kingdom: Animalia
- Phylum: Arthropoda
- Class: Insecta
- Order: Lepidoptera
- Superfamily: Noctuoidea
- Family: Erebidae
- Subfamily: Arctiinae
- Genus: Holophaea
- Species: H. lugens

Binomial name
- Holophaea lugens E. D. Jones, 1908

Species of moth

Holophaea lugens is a moth of the subfamily Arctiinae. It was described by E. Dukinfield Jones in 1908. It is found in Brazil.
