= Diptilon doeri =

Scientific classification
- Kingdom: Animalia
- Phylum: Arthropoda
- Class: Insecta
- Order: Lepidoptera
- Superfamily: Noctuoidea
- Family: Erebidae
- Subfamily: Arctiinae
- Genus: Diptilon
- Species: D. doeri

Binomial name
- Diptilon doeri (Schaus, 1892)

Synonyms
- Syntrichura doeri Schaus, 1892

Species of moth

Diptilon doeri is a moth of the subfamily Arctiinae. It was described by William Schaus in 1892. It is found in Rio de Janeiro, Brazil.
