= Dasysphinx ockendeni =

Scientific classification
- Kingdom: Animalia
- Phylum: Arthropoda
- Class: Insecta
- Order: Lepidoptera
- Superfamily: Noctuoidea
- Family: Erebidae
- Subfamily: Arctiinae
- Genus: Dasysphinx
- Species: D. ockendeni

Binomial name
- Dasysphinx ockendeni Rothschild, 1910

Species of moth

Dasysphinx ockendeni is a moth of the subfamily Arctiinae. It was described by Walter Rothschild in 1910. It is found in Peru. It is named after George Richard Ockenden, who collected the holotype.
