= Scena potentia =

Scientific classification
- Kingdom: Animalia
- Phylum: Arthropoda
- Class: Insecta
- Order: Lepidoptera
- Superfamily: Noctuoidea
- Family: Erebidae
- Subfamily: Arctiinae
- Genus: Scena
- Species: S. potentia

Binomial name
- Scena potentia (H. Druce, 1894)

Synonyms
- Chloropsinus potentia H. Druce, 1894; Scena potential Hernández-Baz, 2013

Species of moth

Scena potentia is a moth in the subfamily Arctiinae. It was described by Herbert Druce in 1894. It is found in Mexico and Costa Rica.
