= Diptilon culex =

Scientific classification
- Domain: Eukaryota
- Kingdom: Animalia
- Phylum: Arthropoda
- Class: Insecta
- Order: Lepidoptera
- Superfamily: Noctuoidea
- Family: Erebidae
- Subfamily: Arctiinae
- Genus: Diptilon
- Species: D. culex

Binomial name
- Diptilon culex (Draudt, 1915)

Synonyms
- Diptilum culex Draudt, 1915

Species of moth

Diptilon culex is a moth of the subfamily Arctiinae. It was described by Max Wilhelm Karl Draudt in 1915. It is found in Brazil.
