= Holophaea lycone =

Scientific classification
- Domain: Eukaryota
- Kingdom: Animalia
- Phylum: Arthropoda
- Class: Insecta
- Order: Lepidoptera
- Superfamily: Noctuoidea
- Family: Erebidae
- Subfamily: Arctiinae
- Genus: Holophaea
- Species: H. lycone

Binomial name
- Holophaea lycone (H. Druce, 1884)

Synonyms
- Ichoria lycone H. Druce, 1884

Species of moth

Holophaea lycone is a moth of the subfamily Arctiinae. It was described by Herbert Druce in 1884. It is found in Costa Rica and Panama.
