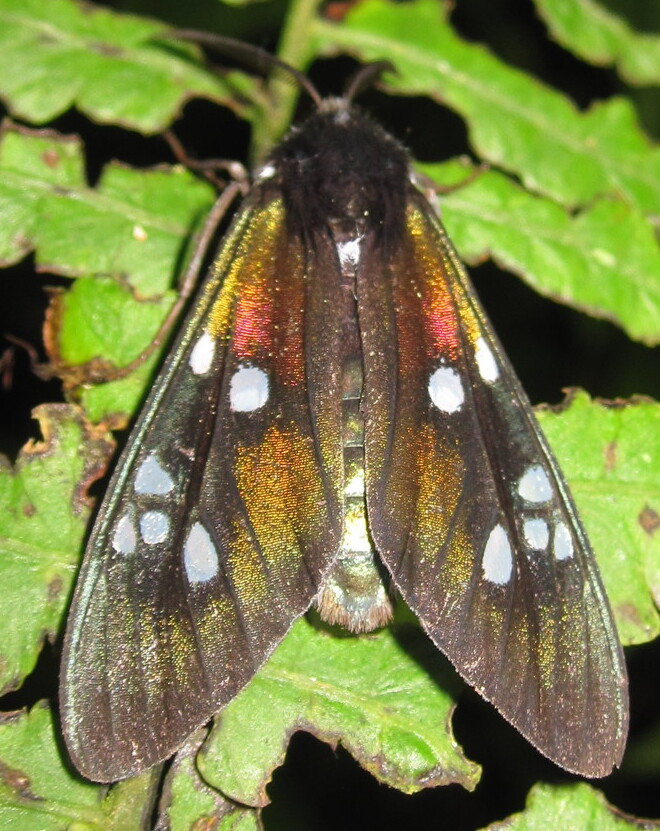

Scientific classification
- Domain: Eukaryota
- Kingdom: Animalia
- Phylum: Arthropoda
- Class: Insecta
- Order: Lepidoptera
- Superfamily: Noctuoidea
- Family: Erebidae
- Subfamily: Arctiinae
- Genus: Chrysocale
- Species: C. gigantea

Binomial name
- Chrysocale gigantea (H. Druce, 1890)

Synonyms
- Eupyra gigantea H. Druce, 1890

= Chrysocale gigantea =

Species of moth

Chrysocale gigantea is a moth of the subfamily Arctiinae. It was described by Herbert Druce in 1890. It is found in Colombia and Bolivia.
