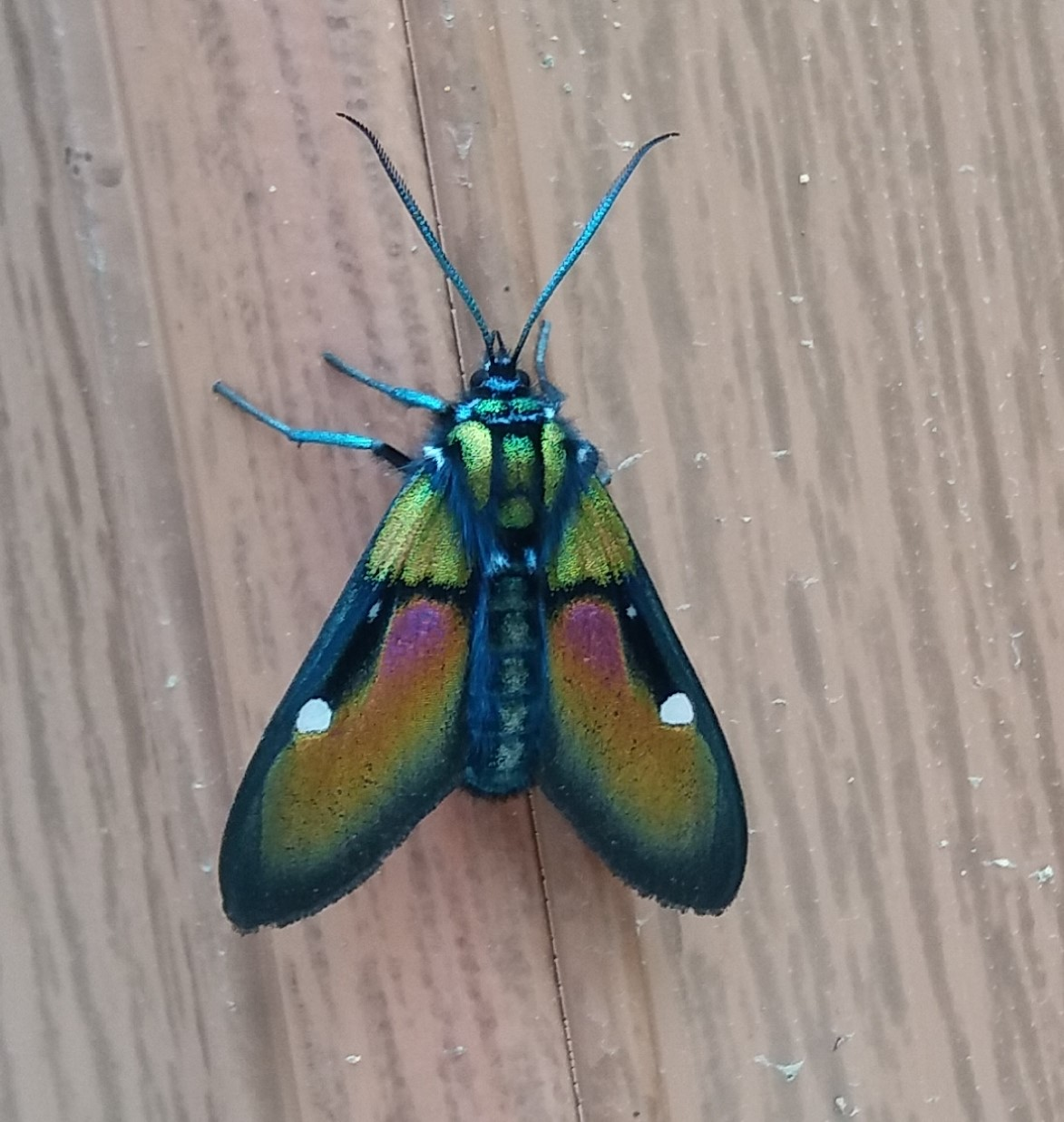

Scientific classification
- Domain: Eukaryota
- Kingdom: Animalia
- Phylum: Arthropoda
- Class: Insecta
- Order: Lepidoptera
- Superfamily: Noctuoidea
- Family: Erebidae
- Subfamily: Arctiinae
- Genus: Chrysocale
- Species: C. ignita

Binomial name
- Chrysocale ignita (Herrich-Schäffer, 1853)

Synonyms
- Eupyra ignita Herrich-Schäffer, [1853]

= Chrysocale ignita =

Species of moth

Chrysocale ignita is a moth of the subfamily Arctiinae. It was described by Gottlieb August Wilhelm Herrich-Schäffer in 1853. It is found in Colombia.
