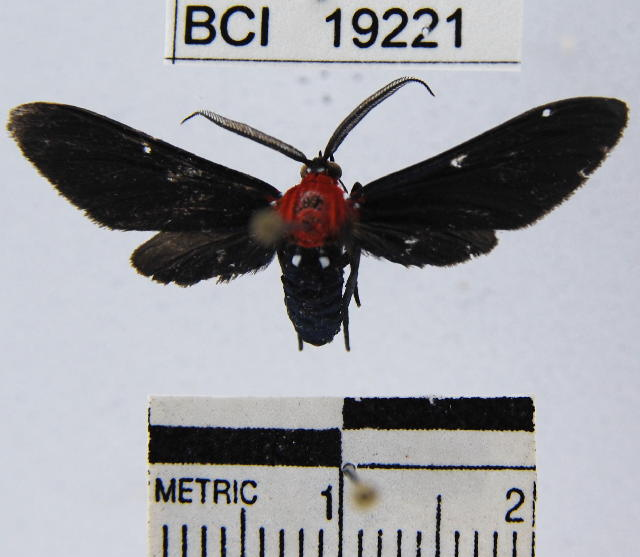
- Psoloptera thoracica

Scientific classification
- Domain: Eukaryota
- Kingdom: Animalia
- Phylum: Arthropoda
- Class: Insecta
- Order: Lepidoptera
- Superfamily: Noctuoidea
- Family: Erebidae
- Subfamily: Arctiinae
- Subtribe: Euchromiina
- Genus: Psoloptera; Butler, 1876

= Psoloptera =

Genus of moths

Psoloptera is a genus of moths in the subfamily Arctiinae.

== Species ==
- Psoloptera aurifera Herrich-Schäffer, 1854
- Psoloptera basifulva Schaus, 1894
- Psoloptera leucosticta Hübner, 1827
- Psoloptera locotmemica Bryk, 1953
- Psoloptera melini Bryk, 1953
- Psoloptera thoracica Walker, 1854
