= Anycles tenebrosa =

Scientific classification
- Domain: Eukaryota
- Kingdom: Animalia
- Phylum: Arthropoda
- Class: Insecta
- Order: Lepidoptera
- Superfamily: Noctuoidea
- Family: Erebidae
- Subfamily: Arctiinae
- Genus: Anycles
- Species: A. tenebrosa

Binomial name
- Anycles tenebrosa (Rothschild, 1912)

Synonyms
- Amycles tenebrosa Rothschild, 1912

Species of moth

Anycles tenebrosa is a moth of the subfamily Arctiinae. It was described by Walter Rothschild in 1912. It is found in Venezuela.
