= Holophaea erharda =

Scientific classification
- Domain: Eukaryota
- Kingdom: Animalia
- Phylum: Arthropoda
- Class: Insecta
- Order: Lepidoptera
- Superfamily: Noctuoidea
- Family: Erebidae
- Subfamily: Arctiinae
- Genus: Holophaea
- Species: H. erharda

Binomial name
- Holophaea erharda Schaus, 1927

Species of moth

Holophaea erharda is a moth of the subfamily Arctiinae. It was described by Schaus in 1927. It is found in Brazil.
