= Diptilon flavipalpis =

Scientific classification
- Kingdom: Animalia
- Phylum: Arthropoda
- Class: Insecta
- Order: Lepidoptera
- Superfamily: Noctuoidea
- Family: Erebidae
- Subfamily: Arctiinae
- Genus: Diptilon
- Species: D. flavipalpis

Binomial name
- Diptilon flavipalpis Hampson, 1911

Species of moth

Diptilon flavipalpis is a moth of the subfamily Arctiinae. It was described by George Hampson in 1911. It is found in Argentina.

The wingspan is about 24 mm. The forewings are hyaline (glass like) with black veins and margins. The hindwings are black, with the fold and tuft white.
