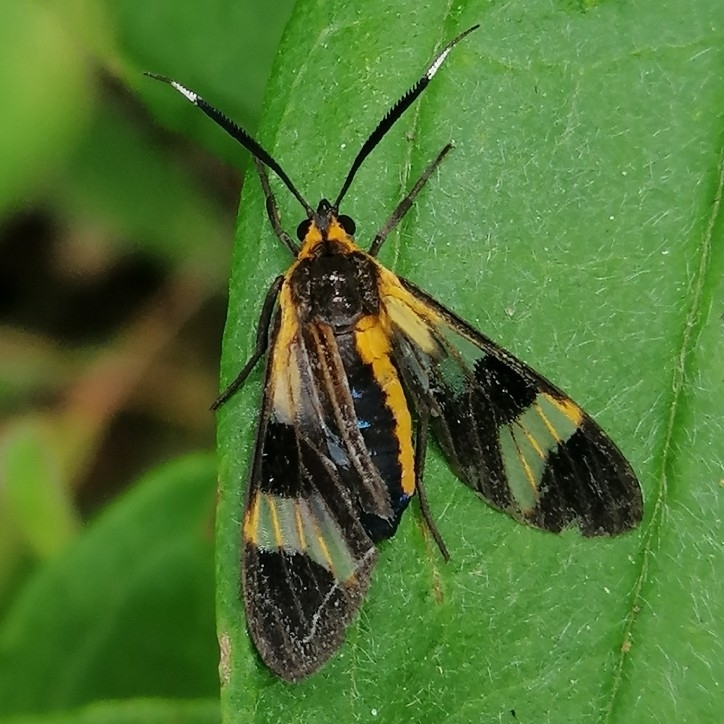
- Dycladia lucetius

Scientific classification
- Kingdom: Animalia
- Phylum: Arthropoda
- Clade: Pancrustacea
- Class: Insecta
- Order: Lepidoptera
- Superfamily: Noctuoidea
- Family: Erebidae
- Subfamily: Arctiinae
- Subtribe: Euchromiina
- Genus: Dycladia; Felder, 1874

= Dycladia =

Genus of moths

Dycladia is a genus of moths in the subfamily Arctiinae. The genus was erected by Felder in 1874.

== Species ==
- Dycladia basimacula Schaus, 1924
- Dycladia correbioides Felder, 1869
- Dycladia lucetius Cramer, 1782
- Dycladia lydia Druce, 1900
- Dycladia marmana Schaus, 1924
- Dycladia melaena Hampson, 1898
- Dycladia transacta Walker
- Dycladia vitrina Rothschild, 1911
- Dycladia xanthobasis Hampson, 1909
