= Diptilon halterata =

Scientific classification
- Domain: Eukaryota
- Kingdom: Animalia
- Phylum: Arthropoda
- Class: Insecta
- Order: Lepidoptera
- Superfamily: Noctuoidea
- Family: Erebidae
- Subfamily: Arctiinae
- Genus: Diptilon
- Species: D. halterata

Binomial name
- Diptilon halterata (Fabricius, 1775)

Synonyms
- Zygaena halterata Fabricius, 1775; Diptilon dieides Prittwitz, 1870

Species of moth

Diptilon halterata is a moth of the subfamily Arctiinae. It was described by Johan Christian Fabricius in 1775. It is found in the Brazilian states of São Paulo, Rio de Janeiro and Paraná.

The forewings are hyaline (glass like) with brown veins and margins and a slight orange streak below the costa and some yellow at the base of the inner margin. There is an oblique brown discoidal bar. The hindwings are hyaline with dark veins and termen. The inner margin is yellow.
