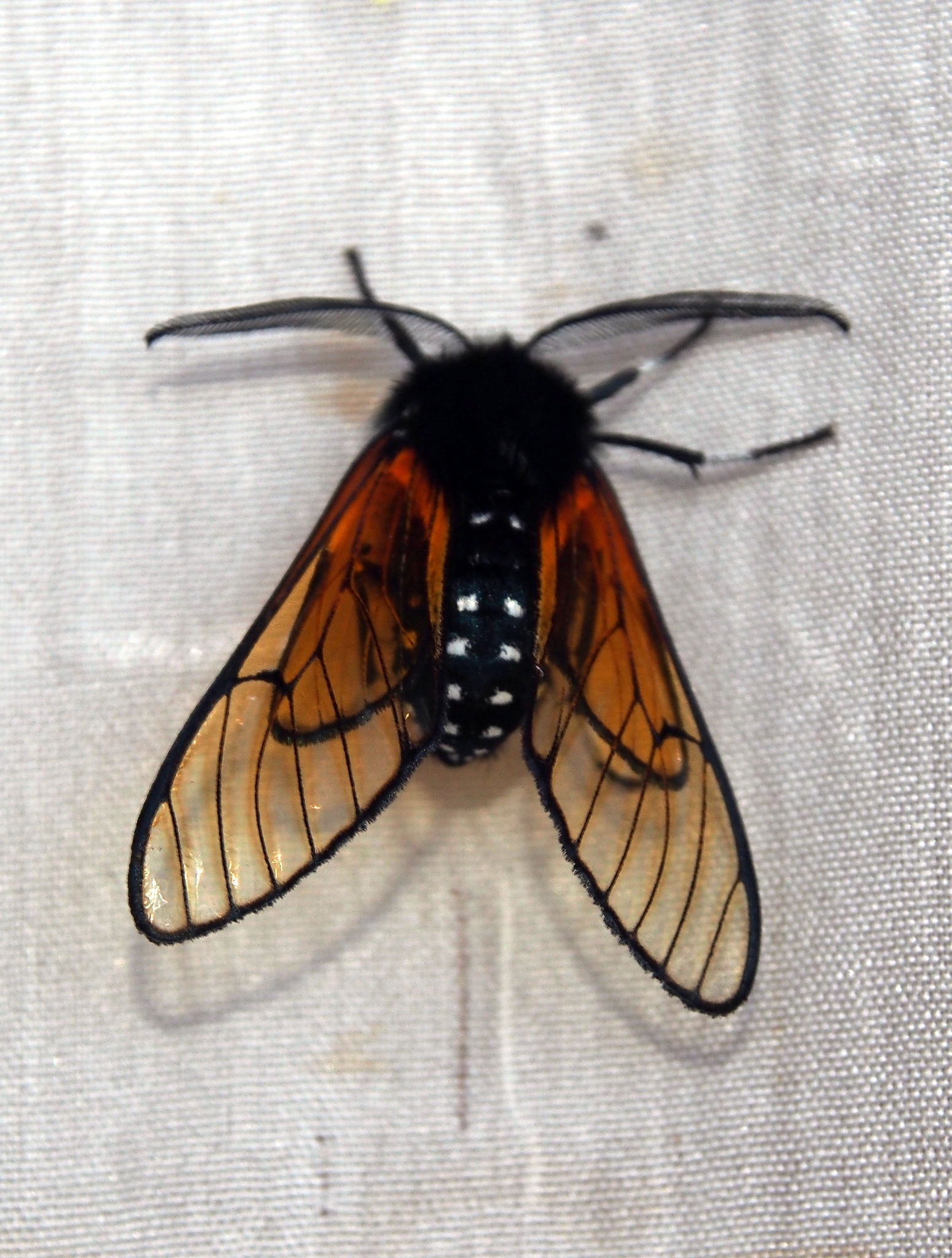
- Dasysphinx volatilis

Scientific classification
- Domain: Eukaryota
- Kingdom: Animalia
- Phylum: Arthropoda
- Class: Insecta
- Order: Lepidoptera
- Superfamily: Noctuoidea
- Family: Erebidae
- Subfamily: Arctiinae
- Subtribe: Euchromiina
- Genus: Dasysphinx; Felder, 1874

= Dasysphinx =

Genus of moths

Dasysphinx is a genus of moths in the subfamily Arctiinae. The genus was erected by Felder in 1874.

== Species ==
- Dasysphinx baroni Rothschild, 1910
- Dasysphinx boettgeri Rothschild, 1911
- Dasysphinx bombiformis Rothschild, 1911
- Dasysphinx flavibasis Gaede, 1926
- Dasysphinx garleppi Rothschild, 1911
- Dasysphinx mucescens Felder, 1869
- Dasysphinx ockendeni Rothschild, 1910
- Dasysphinx pilosa Rothschild, 1910
- Dasysphinx rubrilatera Gaede, 1926
- Dasysphinx semicincta Dognin, 1914
- Dasysphinx tarsipuncta Schaus, 1905
- Dasysphinx volatilis Schaus
