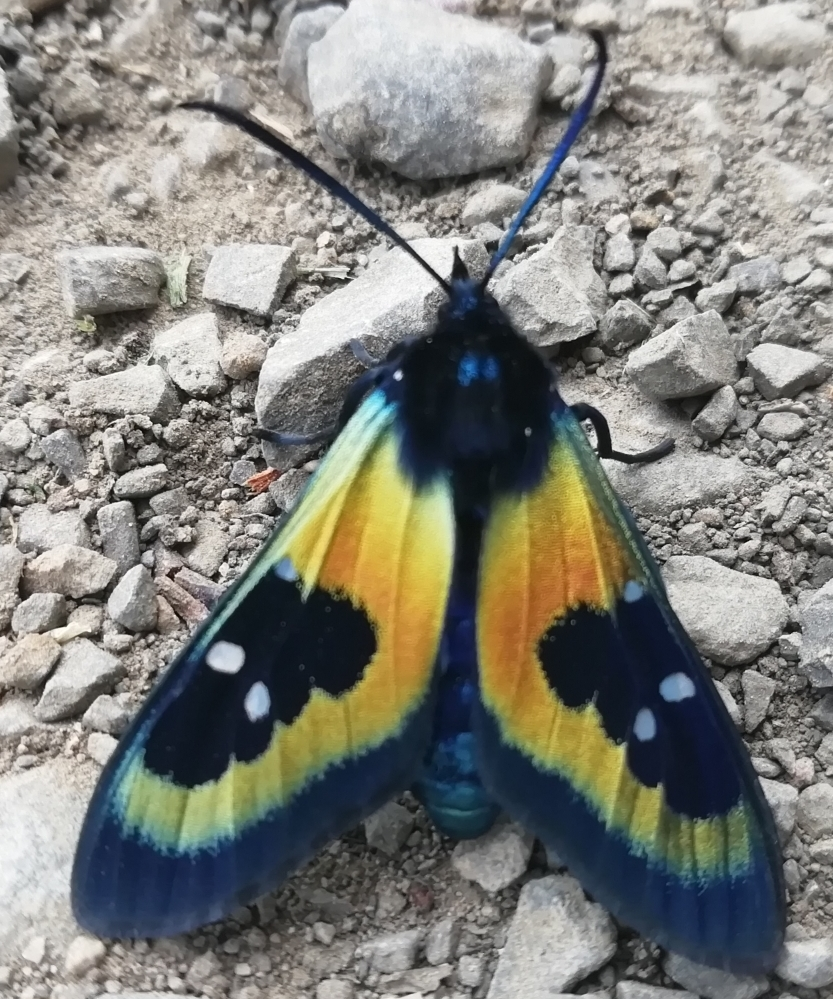

Scientific classification
- Domain: Eukaryota
- Kingdom: Animalia
- Phylum: Arthropoda
- Class: Insecta
- Order: Lepidoptera
- Superfamily: Noctuoidea
- Family: Erebidae
- Subfamily: Arctiinae
- Genus: Chrysocale
- Species: C. splendens

Binomial name
- Chrysocale splendens Dognin, 1888

Synonyms
- Eupyra splendens Dognin, 1888

= Chrysocale splendens =

Species of moth

Chrysocale splendens is a moth of the subfamily Arctiinae. It was described by Paul Dognin in 1888. It is found in Ecuador.
