= Psilopleura sanguiuncta =

Scientific classification
- Kingdom: Animalia
- Phylum: Arthropoda
- Class: Insecta
- Order: Lepidoptera
- Superfamily: Noctuoidea
- Family: Erebidae
- Subfamily: Arctiinae
- Genus: Psilopleura
- Species: P. sanguiuncta

Binomial name
- Psilopleura sanguiuncta Hampson, 1898

Species of moth

Psilopleura sanguiuncta is a species of moth in the subfamily Arctiinae. It was first described by George Hampson in 1898. It is found in Rio Grande do Sul, Brazil.
