= Diptilon philocles =

Scientific classification
- Domain: Eukaryota
- Kingdom: Animalia
- Phylum: Arthropoda
- Class: Insecta
- Order: Lepidoptera
- Superfamily: Noctuoidea
- Family: Erebidae
- Subfamily: Arctiinae
- Genus: Diptilon
- Species: D. philocles

Binomial name
- Diptilon philocles (H. Druce, 1896)

Synonyms
- Syntrichura philocles H. Druce, 1896; Diptilon barbata Schrottky, 1910

Species of moth

Diptilon philocles is a moth of the subfamily Arctiinae. It was described by Herbert Druce in 1896. It is found in Panama and São Paulo, Brazil.
