= Anycles brinkleyi =

Scientific classification
- Domain: Eukaryota
- Kingdom: Animalia
- Phylum: Arthropoda
- Class: Insecta
- Order: Lepidoptera
- Superfamily: Noctuoidea
- Family: Erebidae
- Subfamily: Arctiinae
- Genus: Anycles
- Species: A. brinkleyi

Binomial name
- Anycles brinkleyi (Rothschild, 1912)

Synonyms
- Amycles brinkleyi Rothschild, 1912

Species of moth

Anycles brinkleyi is a moth of the subfamily Arctiinae. It was described by Walter Rothschild in 1912. It was described from the Canca Valley of Colombia.
