= Dasysphinx pilosa =

Scientific classification
- Kingdom: Animalia
- Phylum: Arthropoda
- Class: Insecta
- Order: Lepidoptera
- Superfamily: Noctuoidea
- Family: Erebidae
- Subfamily: Arctiinae
- Genus: Dasysphinx
- Species: D. pilosa

Binomial name
- Dasysphinx pilosa Rothschild, 1910

Synonyms
- Dasysphinx watkinsi Druce, 1911

Species of moth

Dasysphinx pilosa is a moth of the subfamily Arctiinae. It was described by Walter Rothschild, 2nd Baron Rothschild, in 1910. It is found in Peru.
