= Chrysocale uniformis =

Scientific classification
- Domain: Eukaryota
- Kingdom: Animalia
- Phylum: Arthropoda
- Class: Insecta
- Order: Lepidoptera
- Superfamily: Noctuoidea
- Family: Erebidae
- Subfamily: Arctiinae
- Genus: Chrysocale
- Species: C. uniformis

Binomial name
- Chrysocale uniformis Draudt, 1917

Species of moth

Chrysocale uniformis is a moth of the subfamily Arctiinae. It was described by Max Wilhelm Karl Draudt in 1917.
