= Diptilon crassa =

Scientific classification
- Domain: Eukaryota
- Kingdom: Animalia
- Phylum: Arthropoda
- Class: Insecta
- Order: Lepidoptera
- Superfamily: Noctuoidea
- Family: Erebidae
- Subfamily: Arctiinae
- Genus: Diptilon
- Species: D. crassa

Binomial name
- Diptilon crassa Zerny, 1912

Synonyms
- Diptilon crassum

Species of moth

Diptilon crassa is a moth of the subfamily Arctiinae. It was described by Hans Zerny in 1912. It is found in Colombia.

The wingspan is about 32 mm. The forewings are hyaline (glass like) with black-brown veins and margins and an orange streak on the base of the subcostal nervure. The inner area is black brown. The hindwings are hyaline with black-brown veins and margins. The inner area is black brown, slightly irrorated (sprinkled) with grey and the costal area and the cell (except for a streak in the lower extremity) are black brown. The costal edge is white.
