= Dasysphinx boettgeri =

Scientific classification
- Domain: Eukaryota
- Kingdom: Animalia
- Phylum: Arthropoda
- Class: Insecta
- Order: Lepidoptera
- Superfamily: Noctuoidea
- Family: Erebidae
- Subfamily: Arctiinae
- Genus: Dasysphinx
- Species: D. boettgeri

Binomial name
- Dasysphinx boettgeri Rothschild, 1911

Species of moth

Dasysphinx boettgeri is a moth of the subfamily Arctiinae. It was described by Rothschild in 1911. It is found in Peru.
