= Diptilon telamonophorum =

Scientific classification
- Domain: Eukaryota
- Kingdom: Animalia
- Phylum: Arthropoda
- Class: Insecta
- Order: Lepidoptera
- Superfamily: Noctuoidea
- Family: Erebidae
- Subfamily: Arctiinae
- Genus: Diptilon
- Species: D. telamonophorum

Binomial name
- Diptilon telamonophorum Prittwitz, 1870

Synonyms
- Diptilon telamonaphorum

Species of moth

Diptilon telamonophorum is a moth of the subfamily Arctiinae. It was described by Otto von Prittwitz in 1870. It is found in the Brazilian states of Rio de Janeiro and Minas Gerais.
