= Dasysphinx tarsipuncta =

Scientific classification
- Domain: Eukaryota
- Kingdom: Animalia
- Phylum: Arthropoda
- Class: Insecta
- Order: Lepidoptera
- Superfamily: Noctuoidea
- Family: Erebidae
- Subfamily: Arctiinae
- Genus: Dasysphinx
- Species: D. tarsipuncta

Binomial name
- Dasysphinx tarsipuncta Schaus, 1905

Synonyms
- Gymnelia tarsipuncta

Species of moth

Dasysphinx tarsipuncta is a moth of the subfamily Arctiinae. It was described by William Schaus in 1905. It is found in Brazil.

The forewings are hyaline (glass like). The basal area is black to near the middle. The veins are black. The hindwings are black with a large elliptical hyaline patch.
