= Paraethria triseriata =

Scientific classification
- Kingdom: Animalia
- Phylum: Arthropoda
- Clade: Pancrustacea
- Class: Insecta
- Order: Lepidoptera
- Superfamily: Noctuoidea
- Family: Erebidae
- Subfamily: Arctiinae
- Genus: Paraethria
- Species: P. triseriata

Binomial name
- Paraethria triseriata (Herrich-Schäffer, 1855)

Synonyms
- Gnophaela triseriata Herrich-Schäffer, [1855]

Species of moth

Paraethria triseriata is a moth of the subfamily Arctiinae. It was described by Gottlieb August Wilhelm Herrich-Schäffer in 1855. It is found in the Brazilian states of Paraná and Santa Catarina.
