= Chrysocale pava =

Scientific classification
- Kingdom: Animalia
- Phylum: Arthropoda
- Class: Insecta
- Order: Lepidoptera
- Superfamily: Noctuoidea
- Family: Erebidae
- Subfamily: Arctiinae
- Genus: Chrysocale
- Species: C. pava

Binomial name
- Chrysocale pava (Dognin, 1893)

Synonyms
- Thysanoprymna pava Dognin, 1893; Chrysocale olivotincta Kaye, 1919; Poliopastea pava

Species of moth

Chrysocale pava is a moth in the subfamily Arctiinae. It was described by Paul Dognin in 1893. It is found in Venezuela.
