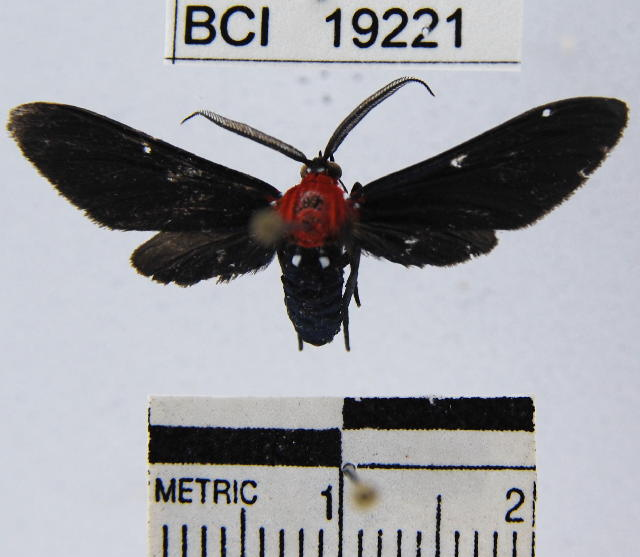

Scientific classification
- Kingdom: Animalia
- Phylum: Arthropoda
- Class: Insecta
- Order: Lepidoptera
- Superfamily: Noctuoidea
- Family: Erebidae
- Subfamily: Arctiinae
- Genus: Psoloptera
- Species: P. thoracica

Binomial name
- Psoloptera thoracica (Walker, 1854)

Synonyms
- Euchromia thoracica Walker, 1854

= Psoloptera thoracica =

Species of moth

Psoloptera thoracica is a moth in the subfamily Arctiinae. It was described by Francis Walker in 1854. It is found in Panama, Ecuador and Tefé, Brazil.
