= Dycladia basimacula =

Scientific classification
- Domain: Eukaryota
- Kingdom: Animalia
- Phylum: Arthropoda
- Class: Insecta
- Order: Lepidoptera
- Superfamily: Noctuoidea
- Family: Erebidae
- Subfamily: Arctiinae
- Genus: Dycladia
- Species: D. basimacula

Binomial name
- Dycladia basimacula Schaus, 1924

Species of moth

Dycladia basimacula is a moth of the subfamily Arctiinae. It was described by William Schaus in 1924. It is found in Venezuela and Trinidad.
