= Dycladia lydia =

Scientific classification
- Domain: Eukaryota
- Kingdom: Animalia
- Phylum: Arthropoda
- Class: Insecta
- Order: Lepidoptera
- Superfamily: Noctuoidea
- Family: Erebidae
- Subfamily: Arctiinae
- Genus: Dycladia
- Species: D. lydia

Binomial name
- Dycladia lydia Druce, 1900

Species of moth

Dycladia lydia is a moth of the subfamily Arctiinae. It was described by Druce in 1900. It is found in southern Brazil.
