= Diptilon chrysocraspis =

Scientific classification
- Kingdom: Animalia
- Phylum: Arthropoda
- Class: Insecta
- Order: Lepidoptera
- Superfamily: Noctuoidea
- Family: Erebidae
- Subfamily: Arctiinae
- Genus: Diptilon
- Species: D. chrysocraspis

Binomial name
- Diptilon chrysocraspis Hampson, 1898

Species of moth

Diptilon chrysocraspis is a moth of the subfamily Arctiinae. It was described by George Hampson in 1898. It is found in Bolivia.
