= Scena propylea =

Scientific classification
- Kingdom: Animalia
- Phylum: Arthropoda
- Class: Insecta
- Order: Lepidoptera
- Superfamily: Noctuoidea
- Family: Erebidae
- Subfamily: Arctiinae
- Genus: Scena
- Species: S. propylea

Binomial name
- Scena propylea (Walker, 1854)

Synonyms
- Euchromia styx Walker, 1854; Scena propylea Druce, 1894; Scena styx Walker, 1854

Species of moth

Scena propylea is a moth in the subfamily Arctiinae. It was described by Francis Walker in 1854. It is found in Mexico.
