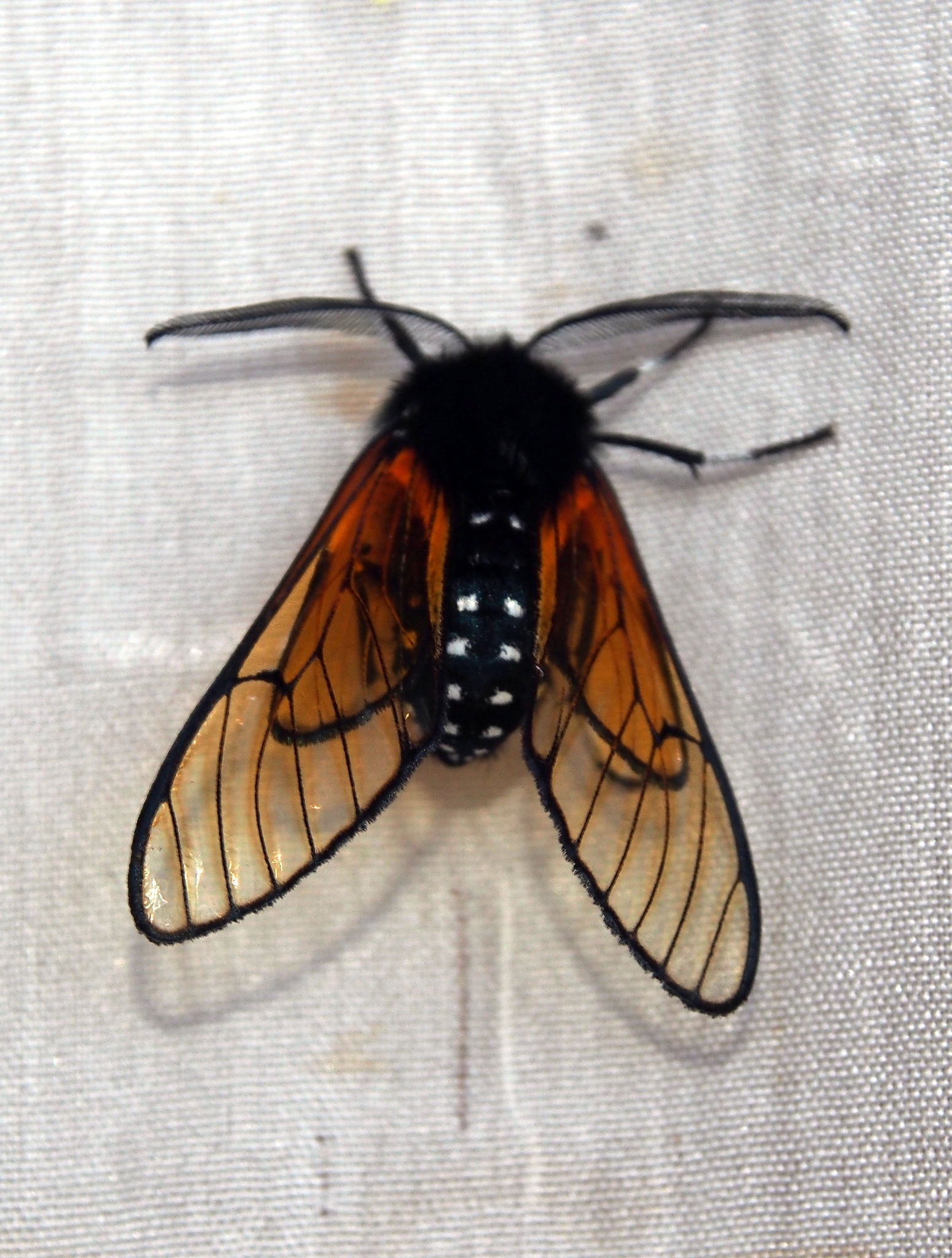

Scientific classification
- Kingdom: Animalia
- Phylum: Arthropoda
- Class: Insecta
- Order: Lepidoptera
- Superfamily: Noctuoidea
- Family: Erebidae
- Subfamily: Arctiinae
- Genus: Dasysphinx
- Species: D. volatilis

Binomial name
- Dasysphinx volatilis Schaus, 1910

= Dasysphinx volatilis =

Species of moth

Dasysphinx volatilis is a moth of the subfamily Arctiinae. It was described by William Schaus in 1910. It is found in Costa Rica.
