= Chrysocale corax =

Scientific classification
- Kingdom: Animalia
- Phylum: Arthropoda
- Class: Insecta
- Order: Lepidoptera
- Superfamily: Noctuoidea
- Family: Erebidae
- Subfamily: Arctiinae
- Genus: Chrysocale
- Species: C. corax

Binomial name
- Chrysocale corax Hampson, 1901

Species of moth

Chrysocale corax is a moth of the subfamily Arctiinae. It was described by George Hampson in 1901. It is found in Peru.
