= Mevania basalis =

Scientific classification
- Kingdom: Animalia
- Phylum: Arthropoda
- Class: Insecta
- Order: Lepidoptera
- Superfamily: Noctuoidea
- Family: Erebidae
- Subfamily: Arctiinae
- Genus: Mevania
- Species: M. basalis

Binomial name
- Mevania basalis (Walker, 1864)

Synonyms
- Nelo basalis Walker, 1864; Mevania angustifascia Gaede, 1926; Microgiton latona Druce, 1890

Species of moth

Mevania basalis is a moth of the subfamily Arctiinae. It was described by Francis Walker in 1864. It is found in Colombia and Bolivia.
