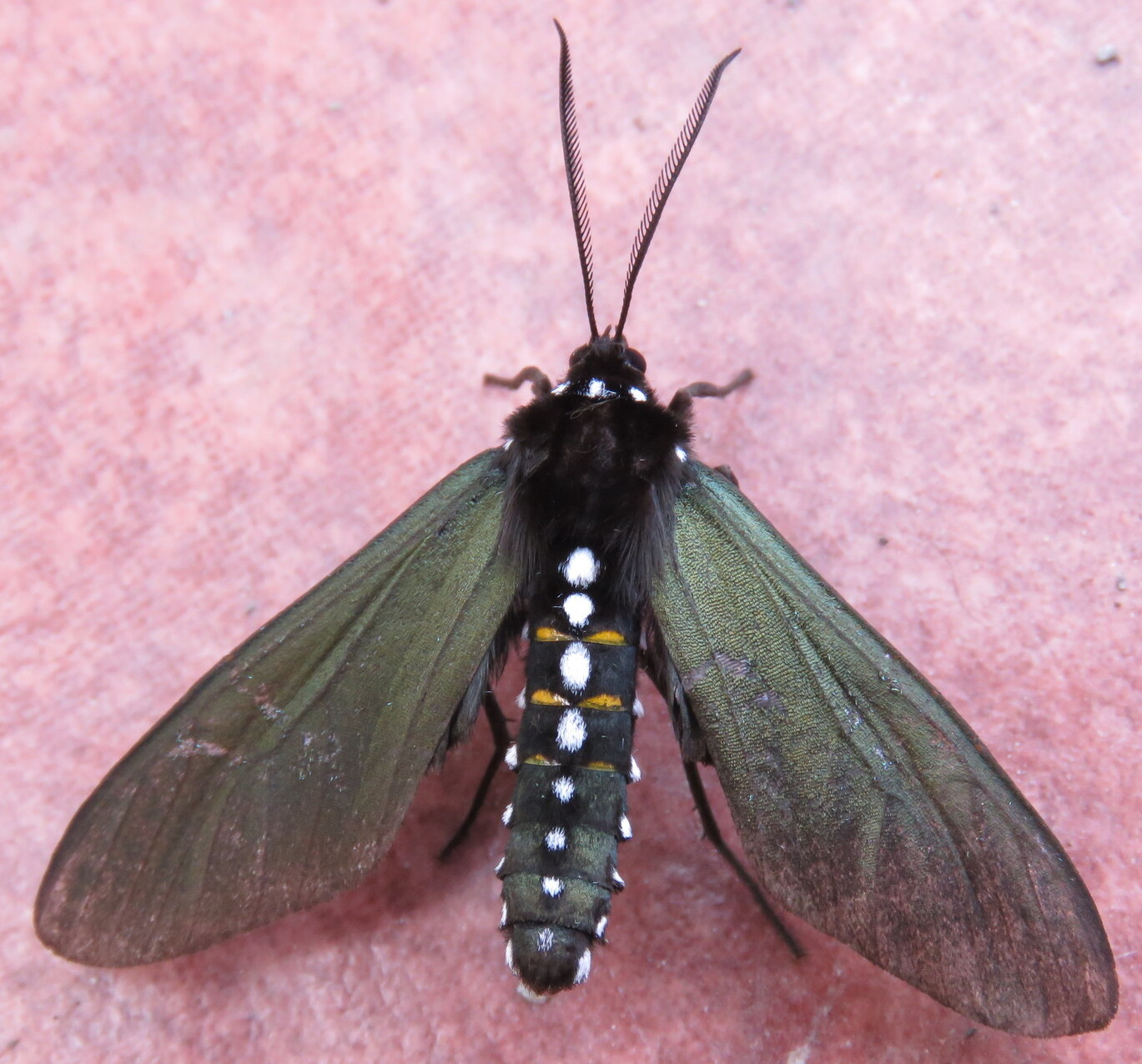

Scientific classification
- Kingdom: Animalia
- Phylum: Arthropoda
- Class: Insecta
- Order: Lepidoptera
- Superfamily: Noctuoidea
- Family: Erebidae
- Subfamily: Arctiinae
- Genus: Chrysocale
- Species: C. ferens

Binomial name
- Chrysocale ferens (Schaus, 1896)

Synonyms
- Eupyra ferens Schaus, 1896; Chrysocale ferens quadruplex Dognin, 1906

= Chrysocale ferens =

Species of moth

Chrysocale ferens is a moth of the subfamily Arctiinae. It was described by William Schaus in 1896. It is found in Bolivia and Peru.

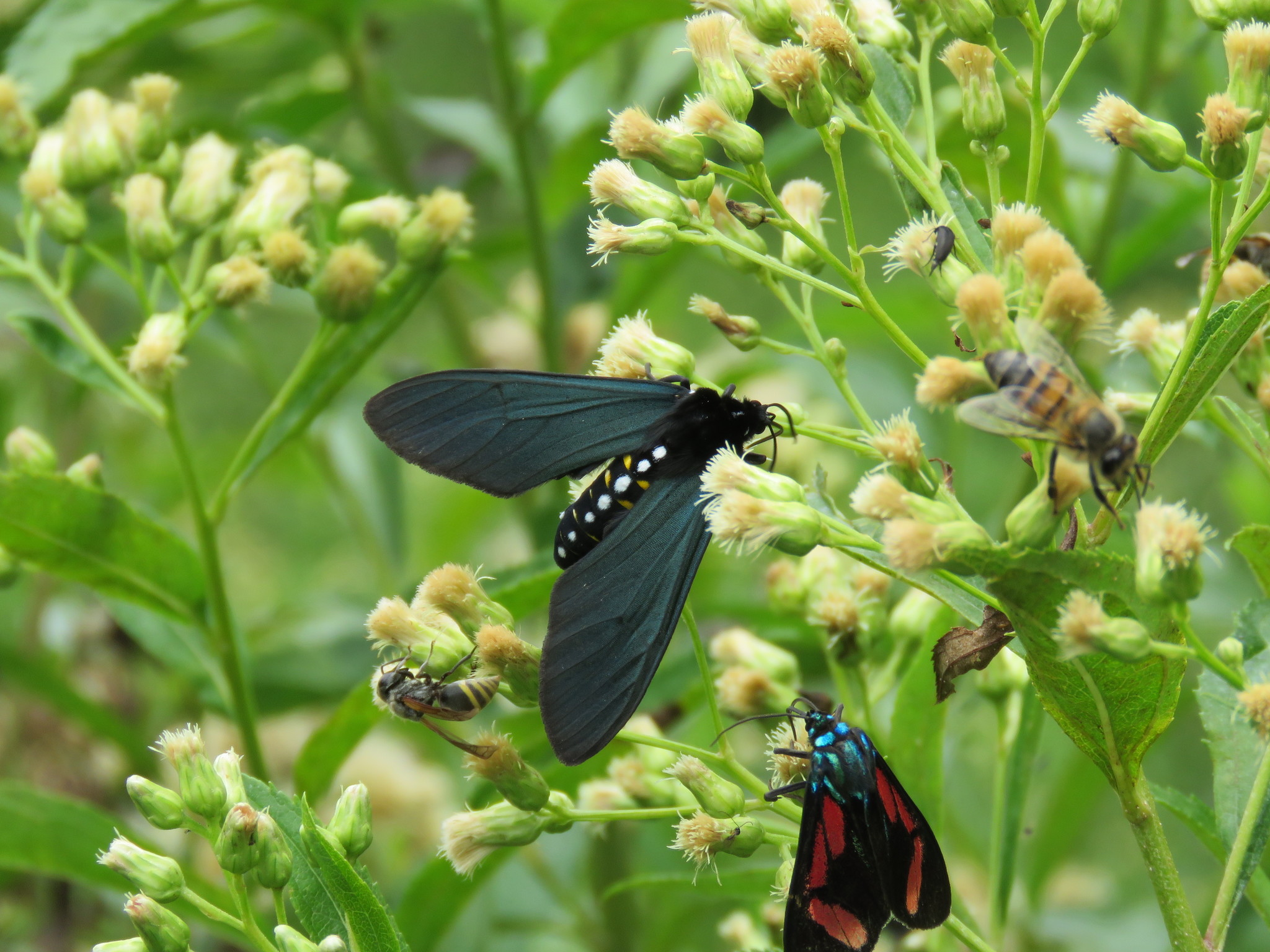
In Argentina
