= Holophaea cardinalis =

Scientific classification
- Domain: Eukaryota
- Kingdom: Animalia
- Phylum: Arthropoda
- Class: Insecta
- Order: Lepidoptera
- Superfamily: Noctuoidea
- Family: Erebidae
- Subfamily: Arctiinae
- Genus: Holophaea
- Species: H. cardinalis

Binomial name
- Holophaea cardinalis Rothschild, 1911

Species of moth

Holophaea cardinalis is a moth of the subfamily Arctiinae. It was described by Rothschild in 1911. It is found in Costa Rica.
