= Holophaea =

Scientific classification
- Kingdom: Animalia
- Phylum: Arthropoda
- Class: Insecta
- Order: Lepidoptera
- Superfamily: Noctuoidea
- Family: Erebidae
- Subfamily: Arctiinae
- Subtribe: Euchromiina
- Genus: Holophaea; Hampson, 1898

Genus of moths

Holophaea is a genus of moths in the subfamily Arctiinae. The genus was erected by George Hampson in 1898.

== Species ==
- Holophaea caerulea Druce, 1898
- Holophaea cardinalis Rothschild, 1911
- Holophaea endoleuca Dognin, 1909
- Holophaea erharda Schaus, 1927
- Holophaea eurytorna Hampson, 1914
- Holophaea gentilicia Schaus, 1911
- Holophaea lugens E. D. Jones, 1908
- Holophaea lycone Druce, 1884
- Holophaea melita Druce, 1899
- Holophaea prometina Druce, 1894
- Holophaea ruatana Druce, 1897
- Holophaea vesta Möschler, 1877
