= Diptilon bivittata =

Scientific classification
- Kingdom: Animalia
- Phylum: Arthropoda
- Class: Insecta
- Order: Lepidoptera
- Superfamily: Noctuoidea
- Family: Erebidae
- Subfamily: Arctiinae
- Genus: Diptilon
- Species: D. bivittata

Binomial name
- Diptilon bivittata (Walker, 1864)

Synonyms
- Cosmosoma bivittata Walker, [1865]

Species of moth

Diptilon bivittata is a moth of the subfamily Arctiinae. It was described by Francis Walker in 1864. It is found in Brazil.
