= Diptilon aurantiipes =

Scientific classification
- Domain: Eukaryota
- Kingdom: Animalia
- Phylum: Arthropoda
- Class: Insecta
- Order: Lepidoptera
- Superfamily: Noctuoidea
- Family: Erebidae
- Subfamily: Arctiinae
- Genus: Diptilon
- Species: D. aurantiipes

Binomial name
- Diptilon aurantiipes Rothschild, 1911

Species of moth

Diptilon aurantiipes is a moth of the subfamily Arctiinae. It was described by Rothschild in 1911. It is found in Brazil.

The wingspan is about 24 mm. The forewings are hyaline (glass like) with brown veins and margins and a yellow streak below the postmedial part of the costa. The hindwings are hyaline with pale brownish veins and margins.
