= Holophaea eurytorna =

Scientific classification
- Kingdom: Animalia
- Phylum: Arthropoda
- Class: Insecta
- Order: Lepidoptera
- Superfamily: Noctuoidea
- Family: Erebidae
- Subfamily: Arctiinae
- Genus: Holophaea
- Species: H. eurytorna

Binomial name
- Holophaea eurytorna Hampson, 1914

Species of moth

Holophaea eurytorna is a moth of the subfamily Arctiinae. It was described by George Hampson in 1914. It is found in Colombia.
