= Hyalomis =

Scientific classification
- Kingdom: Animalia
- Phylum: Arthropoda
- Class: Insecta
- Order: Lepidoptera
- Superfamily: Noctuoidea
- Family: Erebidae
- Subfamily: Arctiinae
- Subtribe: Euchromiina
- Genus: Hyalomis; Hampson, 1905

Genus of moths

Hyalomis is a genus of moths in the subfamily Arctiinae. The genus was first described by George Hampson in 1905.

== Species ==
- Hyalomis espia Dognin, 1897
- Hyalomis hypochryseis Hampson, 1898
- Hyalomis platyleuca Walker, 1854
- Hyalomis thyria Druce, 1898

== Former species ==
- Hyalomis basilutea Walker, 1854, now Hyda basilutea (Walker, 1854)
