= Anycles anthracina =

Scientific classification
- Kingdom: Animalia
- Phylum: Arthropoda
- Clade: Pancrustacea
- Class: Insecta
- Order: Lepidoptera
- Superfamily: Noctuoidea
- Family: Erebidae
- Subfamily: Arctiinae
- Genus: Anycles
- Species: A. anthracina

Binomial name
- Anycles anthracina (Walker, 1854)

Synonyms
- Euchromia anthracina Walker, 1854; Dipteromorpha adusta Felder, 1874

Species of moth

Anycles anthracina is a moth of the subfamily Arctiinae. It was described by Francis Walker in 1854. It is found in Mexico, Guatemala, Panama, Venezuela and Brazil.
