= Hyalomis espia =

Scientific classification
- Domain: Eukaryota
- Kingdom: Animalia
- Phylum: Arthropoda
- Class: Insecta
- Order: Lepidoptera
- Superfamily: Noctuoidea
- Family: Erebidae
- Subfamily: Arctiinae
- Genus: Hyalomis
- Species: H. espia

Binomial name
- Hyalomis espia (Dognin, 1897)

Synonyms
- Desmidocnemis espia Dognin, 1897

Species of moth

Hyalomis espia is a moth of the subfamily Arctiinae. It was described by Paul Dognin in 1897. It is found in Ecuador.
