= Nyridela chalciope =

Scientific classification
- Kingdom: Animalia
- Phylum: Arthropoda
- Clade: Pancrustacea
- Class: Insecta
- Order: Lepidoptera
- Superfamily: Noctuoidea
- Family: Erebidae
- Subfamily: Arctiinae
- Genus: Nyridela
- Species: N. chalciope

Binomial name
- Nyridela chalciope (Hübner, 1831)

Synonyms
- Isanthrene chalciope Hübner, [1831]; Glaucopis acroxantha Perty, [1833]

Species of moth

Nyridela chalciope is a moth of the subfamily Arctiinae. It was described by Jacob Hübner in 1831. It is found in the West Indies (Guadeloupe, St. Kitts, Jamaica, Puerto Rico), Central America, Panama and Colombia.

The larvae feed on Cupania americana.
