= Dasysphinx semicincta =

Scientific classification
- Kingdom: Animalia
- Phylum: Arthropoda
- Clade: Pancrustacea
- Class: Insecta
- Order: Lepidoptera
- Superfamily: Noctuoidea
- Family: Erebidae
- Subfamily: Arctiinae
- Genus: Dasysphinx
- Species: D. semicincta

Binomial name
- Dasysphinx semicincta (Dognin, 1914)

Synonyms
- Sarosa semicincta Dognin, 1914

Species of moth

Dasysphinx semicincta is a moth of the subfamily Arctiinae. It was described by Paul Dognin in 1914. It is found in Colombia. The species is extremely rare and it might be extinct or might be simply an elusive species in remote areas.
