= Diptilon sylpha =

Scientific classification
- Domain: Eukaryota
- Kingdom: Animalia
- Phylum: Arthropoda
- Class: Insecta
- Order: Lepidoptera
- Superfamily: Noctuoidea
- Family: Erebidae
- Subfamily: Arctiinae
- Genus: Diptilon
- Species: D. sylpha

Binomial name
- Diptilon sylpha Dognin, 1902

Species of moth

Diptilon sylpha is a moth of the subfamily Arctiinae. It was described by Paul Dognin in 1902. It is found in Ecuador.

The wingspan is about 28 mm. The forewings are yellowish hyaline (glasslike) with black veins and margins. The hindwings are hyaline, also with black veins and margins. The costal area is white with some black below it.
