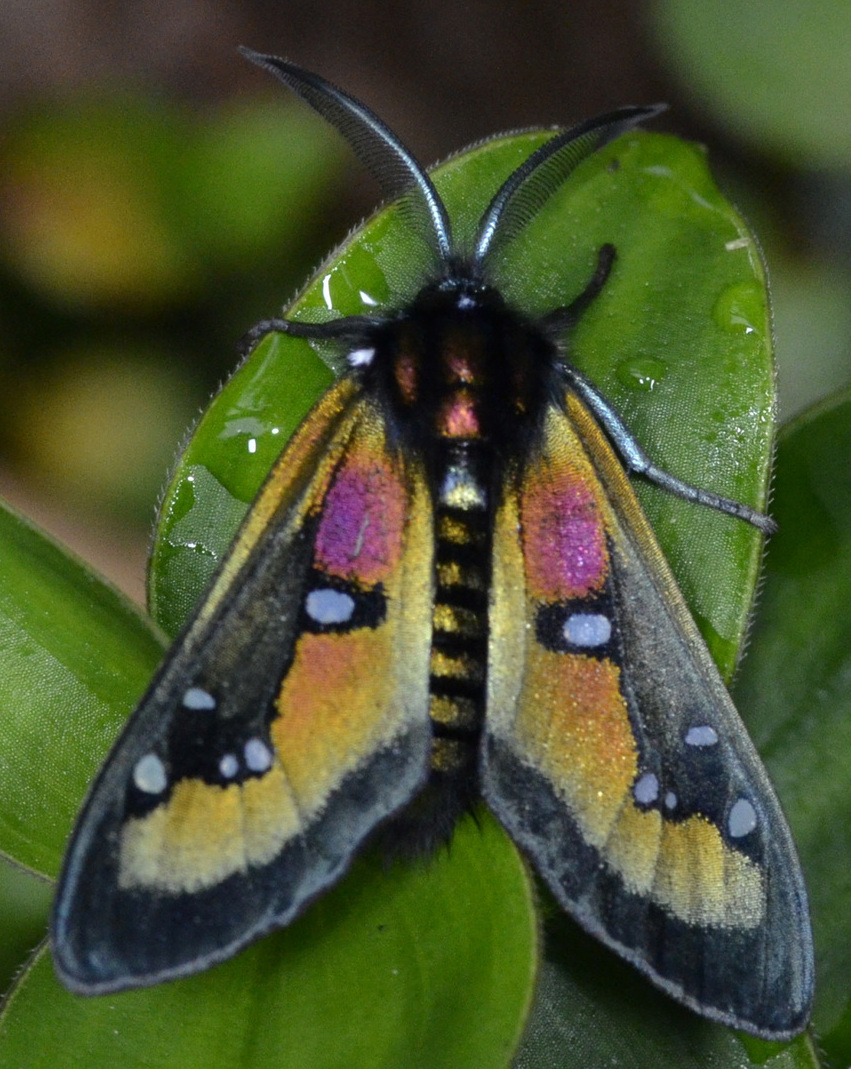

Scientific classification
- Domain: Eukaryota
- Kingdom: Animalia
- Phylum: Arthropoda
- Class: Insecta
- Order: Lepidoptera
- Superfamily: Noctuoidea
- Family: Erebidae
- Subfamily: Arctiinae
- Genus: Chrysocale
- Species: C. regalis

Binomial name
- Chrysocale regalis (Boisduval, 1836)

Synonyms
- Glaucopis regalis Boisduval, 1836

= Chrysocale regalis =

Species of moth

Chrysocale regalis is a moth of the subfamily Arctiinae. It was described by Jean Baptiste Boisduval in 1836. It is found in Ecuador and Bolivia.
