= Mevania quadricolor =

Scientific classification
- Kingdom: Animalia
- Phylum: Arthropoda
- Clade: Pancrustacea
- Class: Insecta
- Order: Lepidoptera
- Superfamily: Noctuoidea
- Family: Erebidae
- Subfamily: Arctiinae
- Genus: Mevania
- Species: M. quadricolor

Binomial name
- Mevania quadricolor Walker, 1854

Species of moth

Mevania quadricolor is a moth of the subfamily Arctiinae. It was described by Francis Walker in 1854. It is found in Ecuador and Venezuela.
