= Chrysocale plebeja =

Scientific classification
- Domain: Eukaryota
- Kingdom: Animalia
- Phylum: Arthropoda
- Class: Insecta
- Order: Lepidoptera
- Superfamily: Noctuoidea
- Family: Erebidae
- Subfamily: Arctiinae
- Genus: Chrysocale
- Species: C. plebeja

Binomial name
- Chrysocale plebeja (Herrich-Schäffer, 1853)

Synonyms
- Eupyra plebeia Herrich-Schäffer, [1853]; Euchromia opulenta Walker, 1854

Species of moth

Chrysocale plebeja is a moth of the subfamily Arctiinae. It was described by Gottlieb August Wilhelm Herrich-Schäffer in 1853. It is found in Venezuela.
