= Anycles dolosus =

Scientific classification
- Kingdom: Animalia
- Phylum: Arthropoda
- Class: Insecta
- Order: Lepidoptera
- Superfamily: Noctuoidea
- Family: Erebidae
- Subfamily: Arctiinae
- Genus: Anycles
- Species: A. dolosus

Binomial name
- Anycles dolosus (Walker, 1854)

Synonyms
- Euchromia dolosa Walker, 1854; Anycles dolosa

Species of moth

Anycles dolosus is a moth of the subfamily Arctiinae. It was described by Francis Walker in 1854. It is found in Brazil.
