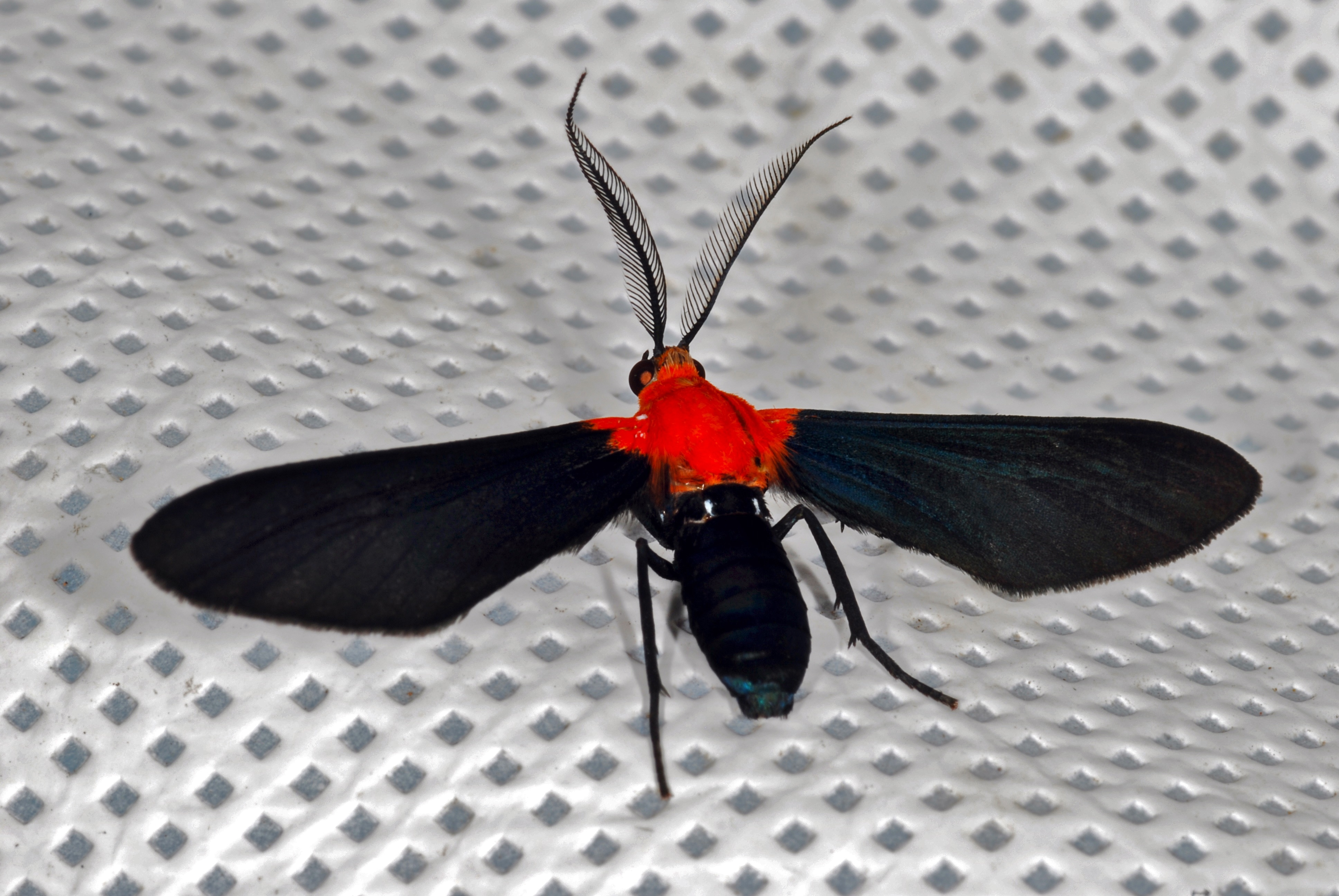

Scientific classification
- Domain: Eukaryota
- Kingdom: Animalia
- Phylum: Arthropoda
- Class: Insecta
- Order: Lepidoptera
- Superfamily: Noctuoidea
- Family: Erebidae
- Subfamily: Arctiinae
- Genus: Psoloptera
- Species: P. basifulva

Binomial name
- Psoloptera basifulva Schaus, 1894

= Psoloptera basifulva =

Species of moth

Psoloptera basifulva is a moth in the subfamily Arctiinae. It was described by William Schaus in 1894. It is found in Panama and Peru.
