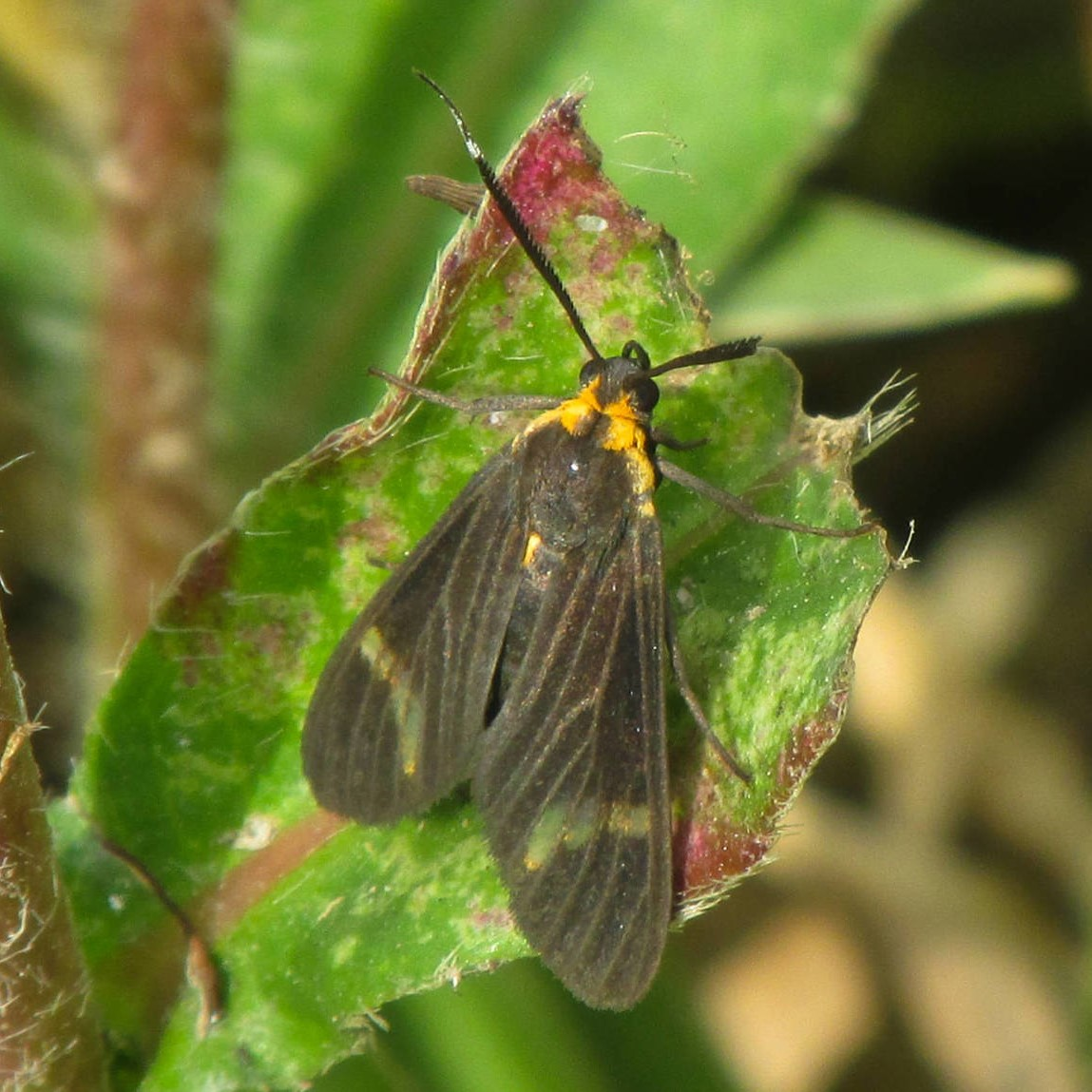

Scientific classification
- Kingdom: Animalia
- Phylum: Arthropoda
- Clade: Pancrustacea
- Class: Insecta
- Order: Lepidoptera
- Superfamily: Noctuoidea
- Family: Erebidae
- Subfamily: Arctiinae
- Genus: Dycladia
- Species: D. transacta

Binomial name
- Dycladia transacta (Walker, 1856)

= Dycladia transacta =

Species of moth

Dycladia transacta is a species of moth in the subfamily Arctiinae. It was first described in 1856 by Francis Walker.
