= Dycladia melaena =

Scientific classification
- Kingdom: Animalia
- Phylum: Arthropoda
- Class: Insecta
- Order: Lepidoptera
- Superfamily: Noctuoidea
- Family: Erebidae
- Subfamily: Arctiinae
- Genus: Dycladia
- Species: D. melaena

Binomial name
- Dycladia melaena Hampson, 1898

Synonyms
- Dycladia melaena brasiliensis Draudt, 1915

Species of moth

Dycladia melaena is a moth of the subfamily Arctiinae. It was described by George Hampson in 1898. It is found in Bolivia and Espírito Santo, Brazil.
