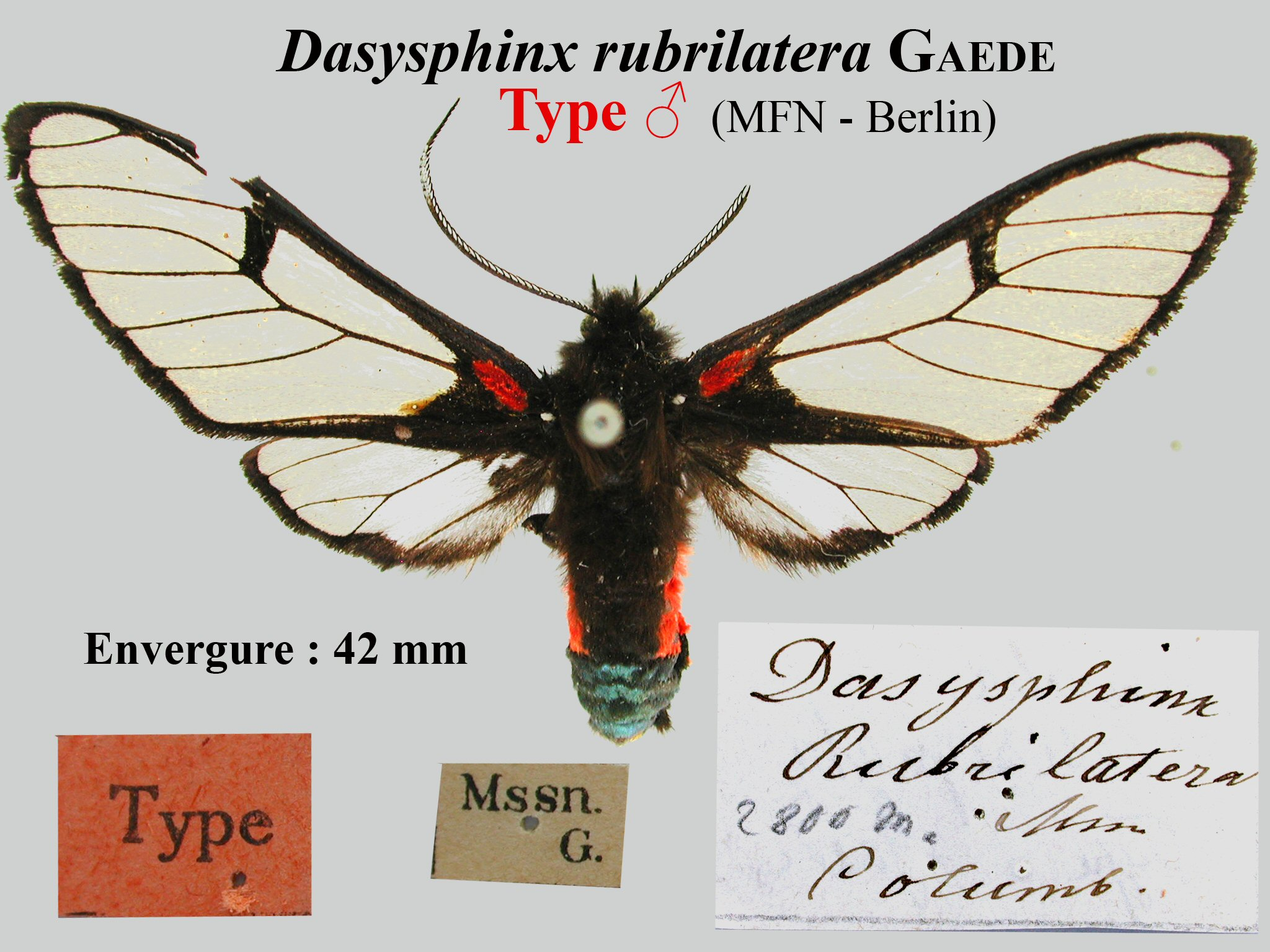
- Diagram of Dasysphinx rubrilatera

Scientific classification
- Kingdom: Animalia
- Phylum: Arthropoda
- Clade: Pancrustacea
- Class: Insecta
- Order: Lepidoptera
- Superfamily: Noctuoidea
- Family: Erebidae
- Subfamily: Arctiinae
- Genus: Dasysphinx
- Species: D. rubrilatera

Binomial name
- Dasysphinx rubrilatera Gaede, 1926

= Dasysphinx rubrilatera =

Species of moth

Dasysphinx rubrilatera is a moth of the subfamily Arctiinae, found in Colombia. It was described by Max Gaede in 1926.
