= Chrysocale fletcheri =

Scientific classification
- Kingdom: Animalia
- Phylum: Arthropoda
- Class: Insecta
- Order: Lepidoptera
- Superfamily: Noctuoidea
- Family: Erebidae
- Subfamily: Arctiinae
- Genus: Chrysocale
- Species: C. fletcheri

Binomial name
- Chrysocale fletcheri Viette, 1980

Species of moth

Chrysocale fletcheri is a moth of the subfamily Arctiinae. It was described by Viette in 1980. It is found in Peru.
