= Dasysphinx flavibasis =

Scientific classification
- Domain: Eukaryota
- Kingdom: Animalia
- Phylum: Arthropoda
- Class: Insecta
- Order: Lepidoptera
- Superfamily: Noctuoidea
- Family: Erebidae
- Subfamily: Arctiinae
- Genus: Dasysphinx
- Species: D. flavibasis

Binomial name
- Dasysphinx flavibasis Gaede, 1926

Species of moth

Dasysphinx flavibasis is a moth of the subfamily Arctiinae. It was described by Max Gaede in 1926. It is found in Peru.
