= Paraethria flavosignata =

Scientific classification
- Kingdom: Animalia
- Phylum: Arthropoda
- Clade: Pancrustacea
- Class: Insecta
- Order: Lepidoptera
- Superfamily: Noctuoidea
- Family: Erebidae
- Subfamily: Arctiinae
- Genus: Paraethria
- Species: P. flavosignata

Binomial name
- Paraethria flavosignata Rothschild, 1911

Species of moth

Paraethria flavosignata is a moth of the subfamily Arctiinae. It was described by Rothschild in 1911. It is found in Bolivia.
