= Mevania larissa =

Scientific classification
- Domain: Eukaryota
- Kingdom: Animalia
- Phylum: Arthropoda
- Class: Insecta
- Order: Lepidoptera
- Superfamily: Noctuoidea
- Family: Erebidae
- Subfamily: Arctiinae
- Genus: Mevania
- Species: M. larissa

Binomial name
- Mevania larissa (Druce, 1890)

Synonyms
- Microgiton larissa Druce, 1890

Species of moth

Mevania larissa is a moth of the subfamily Arctiinae. It was described by Druce in 1890. It is found in Ecuador.
