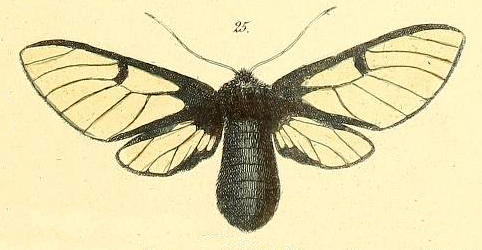
- An illustration of a female, 1874.

Scientific classification
- Domain: Eukaryota
- Kingdom: Animalia
- Phylum: Arthropoda
- Class: Insecta
- Order: Lepidoptera
- Superfamily: Noctuoidea
- Family: Erebidae
- Subfamily: Arctiinae
- Genus: Dasysphinx
- Species: D. mucescens

Binomial name
- Dasysphinx mucescens Felder, 1874

= Dasysphinx mucescens =

Species of moth

Dasysphinx mucescens is a moth of the subfamily Arctiinae. It was described by Felder in 1874. It is found in Colombia.
