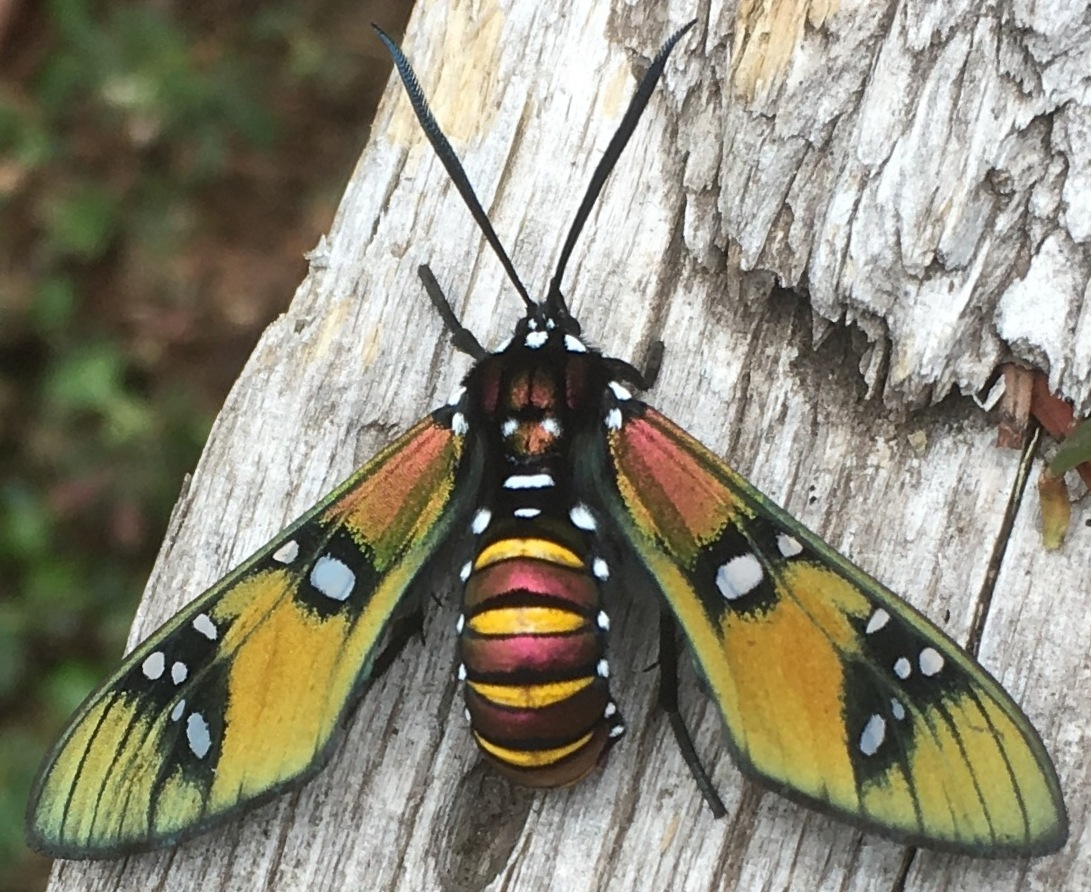
- In Mexico

Scientific classification
- Kingdom: Animalia
- Phylum: Arthropoda
- Clade: Pancrustacea
- Class: Insecta
- Order: Lepidoptera
- Superfamily: Noctuoidea
- Family: Erebidae
- Subfamily: Arctiinae
- Genus: Chrysocale
- Species: C. principalis

Binomial name
- Chrysocale principalis (Walker, 1864)

Synonyms
- Eupyra principalis Walker, [1865]

= Chrysocale principalis =

Princely tiger moth

Species of moth

Chrysocale principalis, the princely tiger moth, is a moth of the subfamily Arctiinae. It was described by Francis Walker in 1864. It is found in Mexico (Jalisco, Michoacán, Oaxaca, Tamaulipas) and Guatemala.

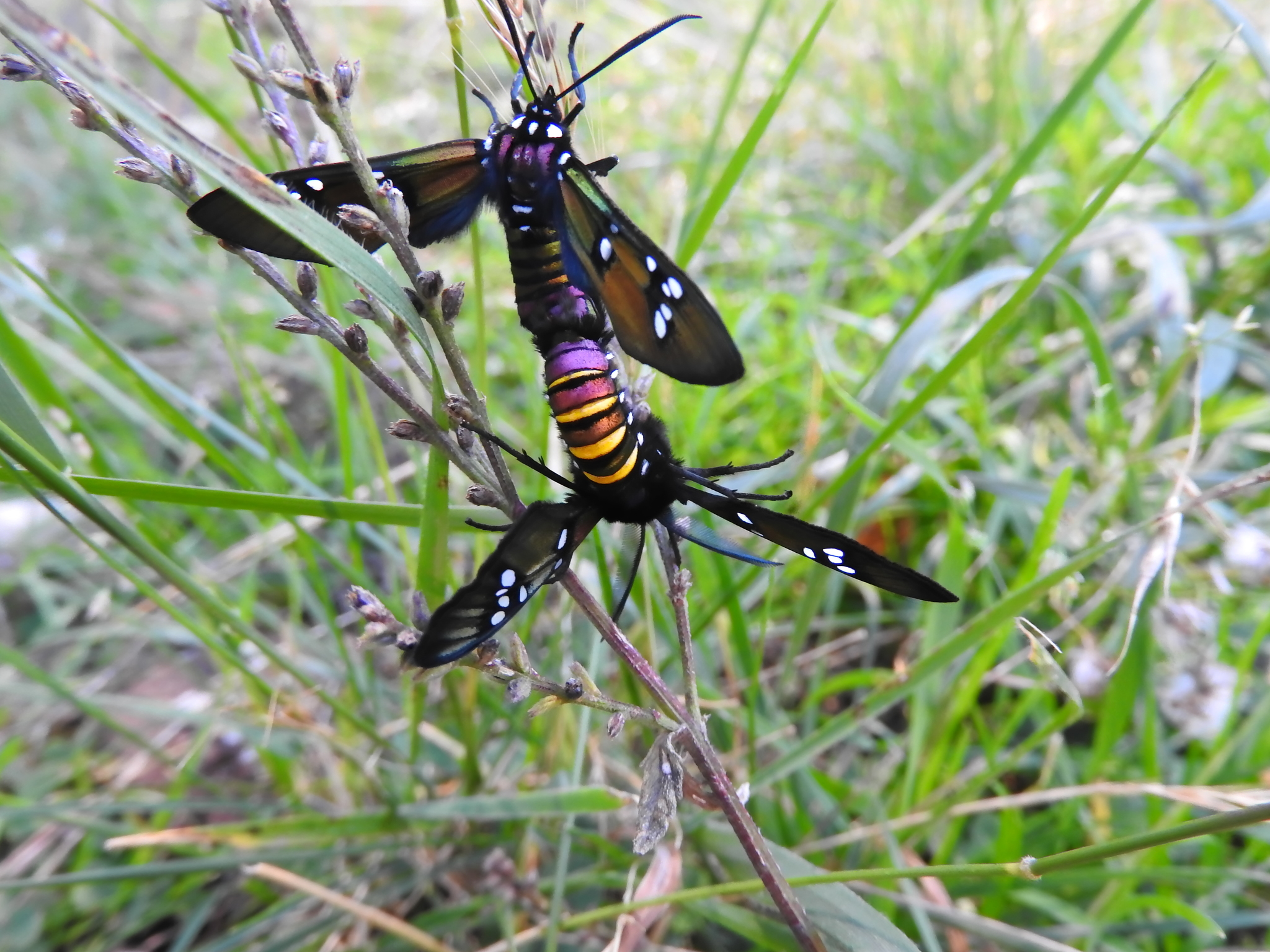
Mating

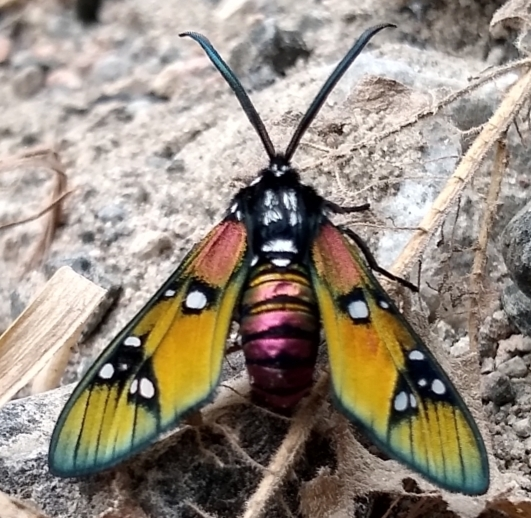
In Mexico

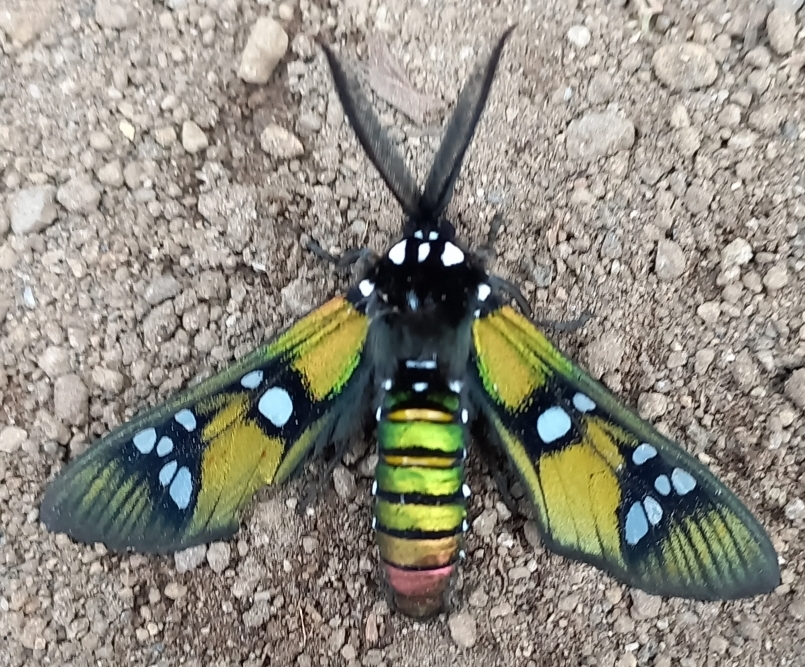
In Guatemala

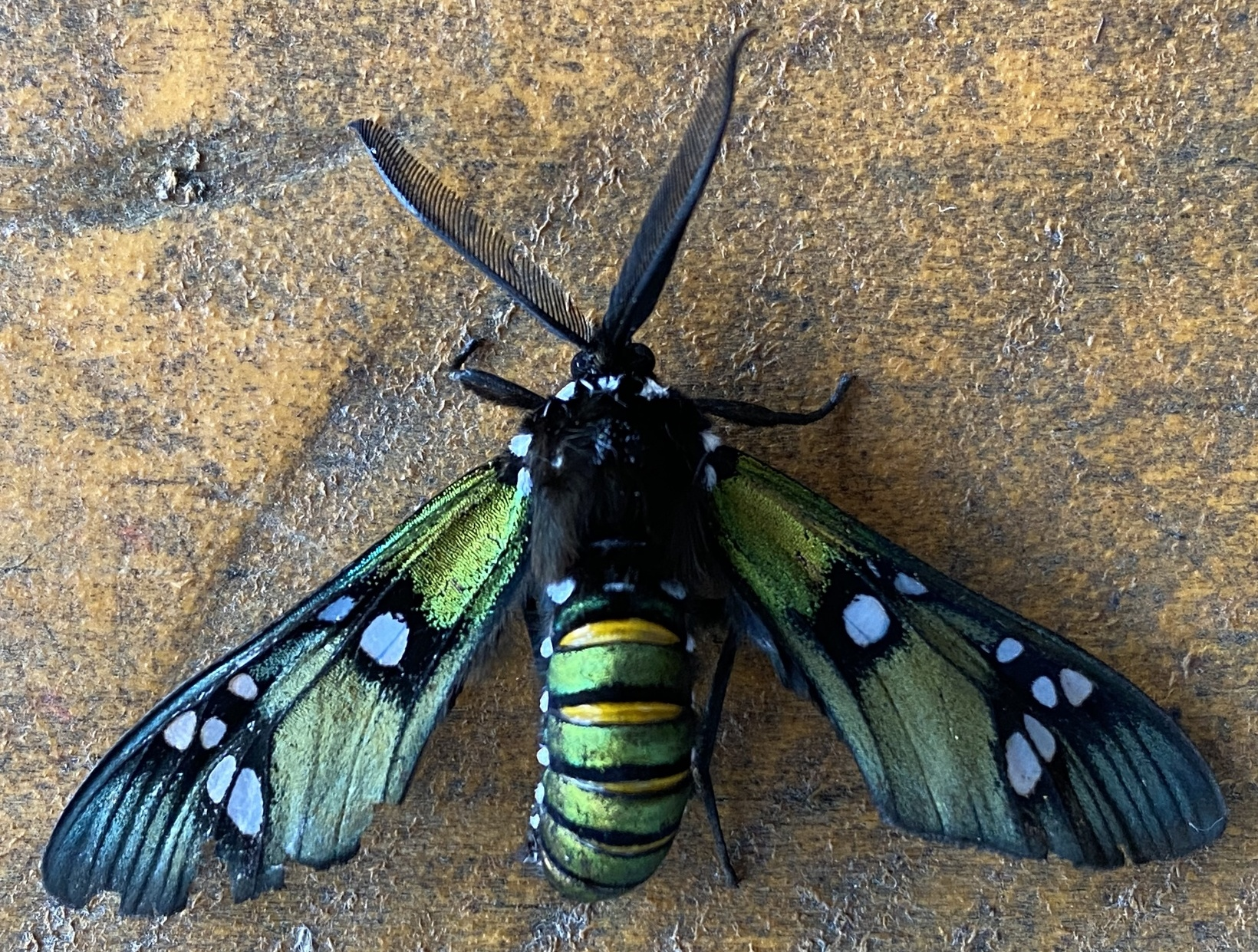
In Honduras

== Description ==
Males have antennae that are more broadly pectinated compared to that of females, though in both sexes the color is a black-blue. There are three white dots on the thorax, two white dots at each wing's base, and two smaller white marks on the moth's disc. Each leg has a white spot as well.
