= Holophaea gentilicia =

Scientific classification
- Domain: Eukaryota
- Kingdom: Animalia
- Phylum: Arthropoda
- Class: Insecta
- Order: Lepidoptera
- Superfamily: Noctuoidea
- Family: Erebidae
- Subfamily: Arctiinae
- Genus: Holophaea
- Species: H. gentilicia

Binomial name
- Holophaea gentilicia Schaus, 1911

Species of moth

Holophaea gentilicia is a moth of the subfamily Arctiinae. It was described by Schaus in 1911. It is found in Costa Rica.
