= Hyperphara =

Scientific classification
- Kingdom: Animalia
- Phylum: Arthropoda
- Class: Insecta
- Order: Lepidoptera
- Superfamily: Noctuoidea
- Family: Erebidae
- Subfamily: Arctiinae
- Subtribe: Euchromiina
- Genus: Hyperphara; Hampson, 1898
- Species: H. junctura

Binomial name
- Hyperphara junctura (Walker, 1864)

Synonyms
- Melanchroia junctura Walker, [1865]; Microgiton cingulosa Felder, 1874

Genus of moths

Hyperphara is a monotypic moth genus in the subfamily Arctiinae erected by George Hampson in 1898. Its only species, Hyperphara junctura, was described by Francis Walker in 1864. It is found in Colombia.
