= Holophaea prometina =

Scientific classification
- Domain: Eukaryota
- Kingdom: Animalia
- Phylum: Arthropoda
- Class: Insecta
- Order: Lepidoptera
- Superfamily: Noctuoidea
- Family: Erebidae
- Subfamily: Arctiinae
- Genus: Holophaea
- Species: H. prometina

Binomial name
- Holophaea prometina (H. Druce, 1894)

Synonyms
- Thrinacia prometina H. Druce, 1897

Species of moth

Holophaea prometina is a moth of the subfamily Arctiinae. It was described by Herbert Druce in 1894. It is found in Mexico.
