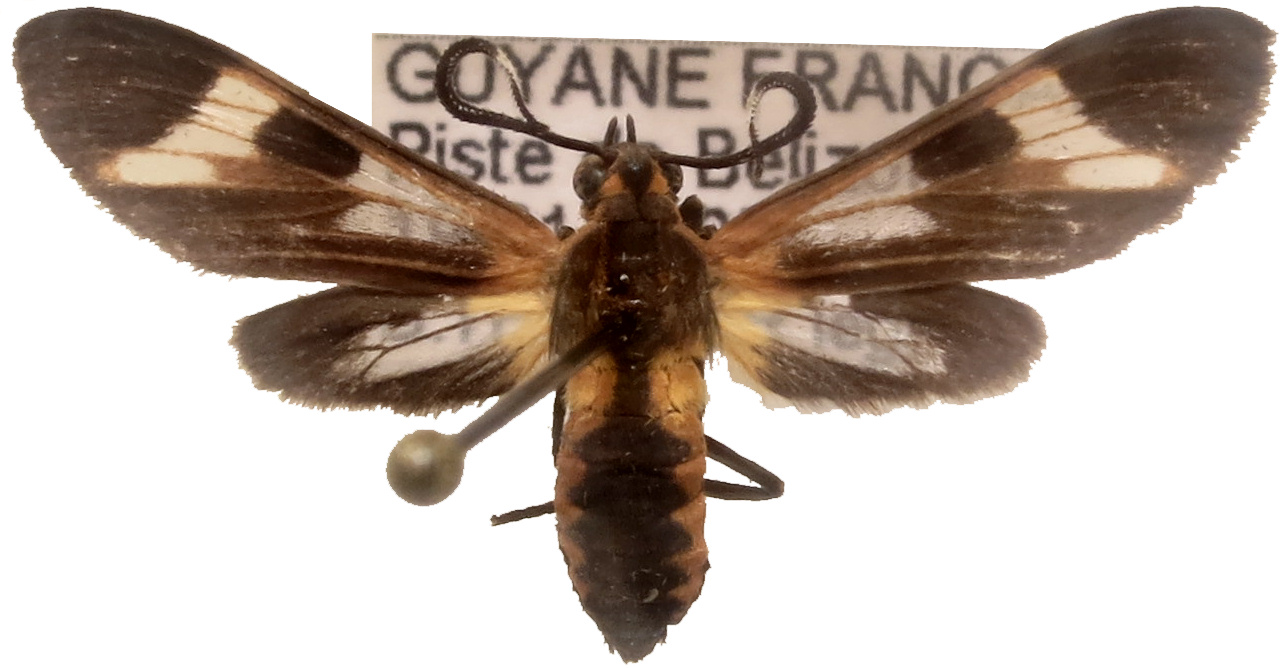
- Dycladia lucetius - French Guiana

Scientific classification
- Kingdom: Animalia
- Phylum: Arthropoda
- Class: Insecta
- Order: Lepidoptera
- Superfamily: Noctuoidea
- Family: Erebidae
- Subfamily: Arctiinae
- Genus: Dycladia
- Species: D. lucetius

Binomial name
- Dycladia lucetius (Cramer, 1782)

Synonyms
- Sphinx lucetius Stoll, [1781]; Eurata transiens Walker, 1856

= Dycladia lucetius =

Species of moth

Dycladia lucetius is a moth of the subfamily Arctiinae. It was described by Pieter Cramer in 1782. It is found in Brazil (São Paulo, Lower Amazons).
