= Psoloptera aurifera =

Scientific classification
- Domain: Eukaryota
- Kingdom: Animalia
- Phylum: Arthropoda
- Class: Insecta
- Order: Lepidoptera
- Superfamily: Noctuoidea
- Family: Erebidae
- Subfamily: Arctiinae
- Genus: Psoloptera
- Species: P. aurifera

Binomial name
- Psoloptera aurifera (Herrich-Schäffer, 1854)

Synonyms
- Laemocharis aurifera Herrich-Schäffer, [1854]

Species of moth

Psoloptera aurifera is a moth in the subfamily Arctiinae. It was described by Gottlieb August Wilhelm Herrich-Schäffer in 1854. It is found in Rio de Janeiro, Brazil.
