= Nyridela =

Scientific classification
- Domain: Eukaryota
- Kingdom: Animalia
- Phylum: Arthropoda
- Class: Insecta
- Order: Lepidoptera
- Superfamily: Noctuoidea
- Family: Erebidae
- Subfamily: Arctiinae
- Subtribe: Euchromiina
- Genus: Nyridela; Lucas, 1857

Synonyms
- Mochloptera Butler, 1876

Genus of moths

Nyridela is a genus of moths in the family Erebidae.

== Species ==
- Nyridela chalciope Hübner, 1827
- Nyridela xanthocera Walker, 1856
