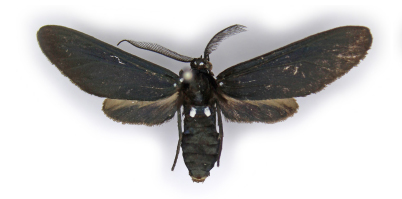

Scientific classification
- Kingdom: Animalia
- Phylum: Arthropoda
- Clade: Pancrustacea
- Class: Insecta
- Order: Lepidoptera
- Superfamily: Noctuoidea
- Family: Erebidae
- Subfamily: Arctiinae
- Genus: Psoloptera
- Species: P. leucosticta

Binomial name
- Psoloptera leucosticta (Hübner, [1809])

Synonyms
- Glaucopis leucosticta Hübner, [1809]

= Psoloptera leucosticta =

Species of moth

Psoloptera leucosticta is a moth in the subfamily Arctiinae. It was described by Jacob Hübner in 1809. It is found in Pará, Brazil.
