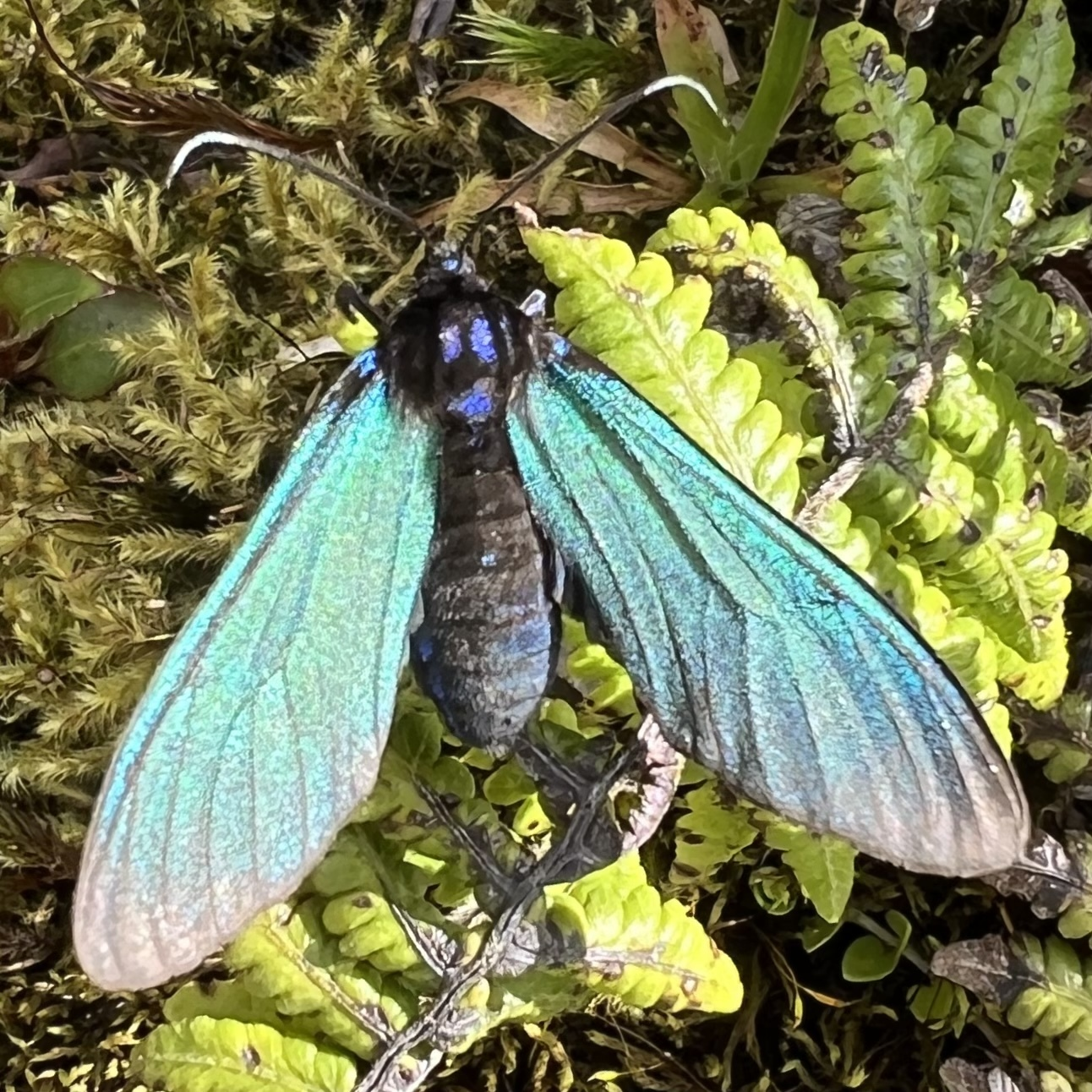

Scientific classification
- Domain: Eukaryota
- Kingdom: Animalia
- Phylum: Arthropoda
- Class: Insecta
- Order: Lepidoptera
- Superfamily: Noctuoidea
- Family: Erebidae
- Subfamily: Arctiinae
- Genus: Chrysocale
- Species: C. gigas

Binomial name
- Chrysocale gigas Rothschild, 1911

= Chrysocale gigas =

Species of moth

Chrysocale gigas is a moth of the subfamily Arctiinae. It was described by Rothschild in 1911. It is found in Colombia, Ecuador and Peru.
