= Diptilon aterea =

Scientific classification
- Domain: Eukaryota
- Kingdom: Animalia
- Phylum: Arthropoda
- Class: Insecta
- Order: Lepidoptera
- Superfamily: Noctuoidea
- Family: Erebidae
- Subfamily: Arctiinae
- Genus: Diptilon
- Species: D. aterea

Binomial name
- Diptilon aterea Schaus, 1901

Species of moth

Diptilon aterea is a moth of the subfamily Arctiinae. It was described by William Schaus in 1901. It is found in Brazil and Paraguay.

The wingspan is about 26 mm. The forewings are hyaline (glass like) with black veins and margins and some orange at the base. The hindwings are orange yellow with a black terminal band.
