= Holophaea melita =

Scientific classification
- Domain: Eukaryota
- Kingdom: Animalia
- Phylum: Arthropoda
- Class: Insecta
- Order: Lepidoptera
- Superfamily: Noctuoidea
- Family: Erebidae
- Subfamily: Arctiinae
- Genus: Holophaea
- Species: H. melita

Binomial name
- Holophaea melita H. Druce, 1899

Species of moth

Holophaea melita is a moth of the subfamily Arctiinae. It was described by Herbert Druce in 1899. It is found in Ecuador.
