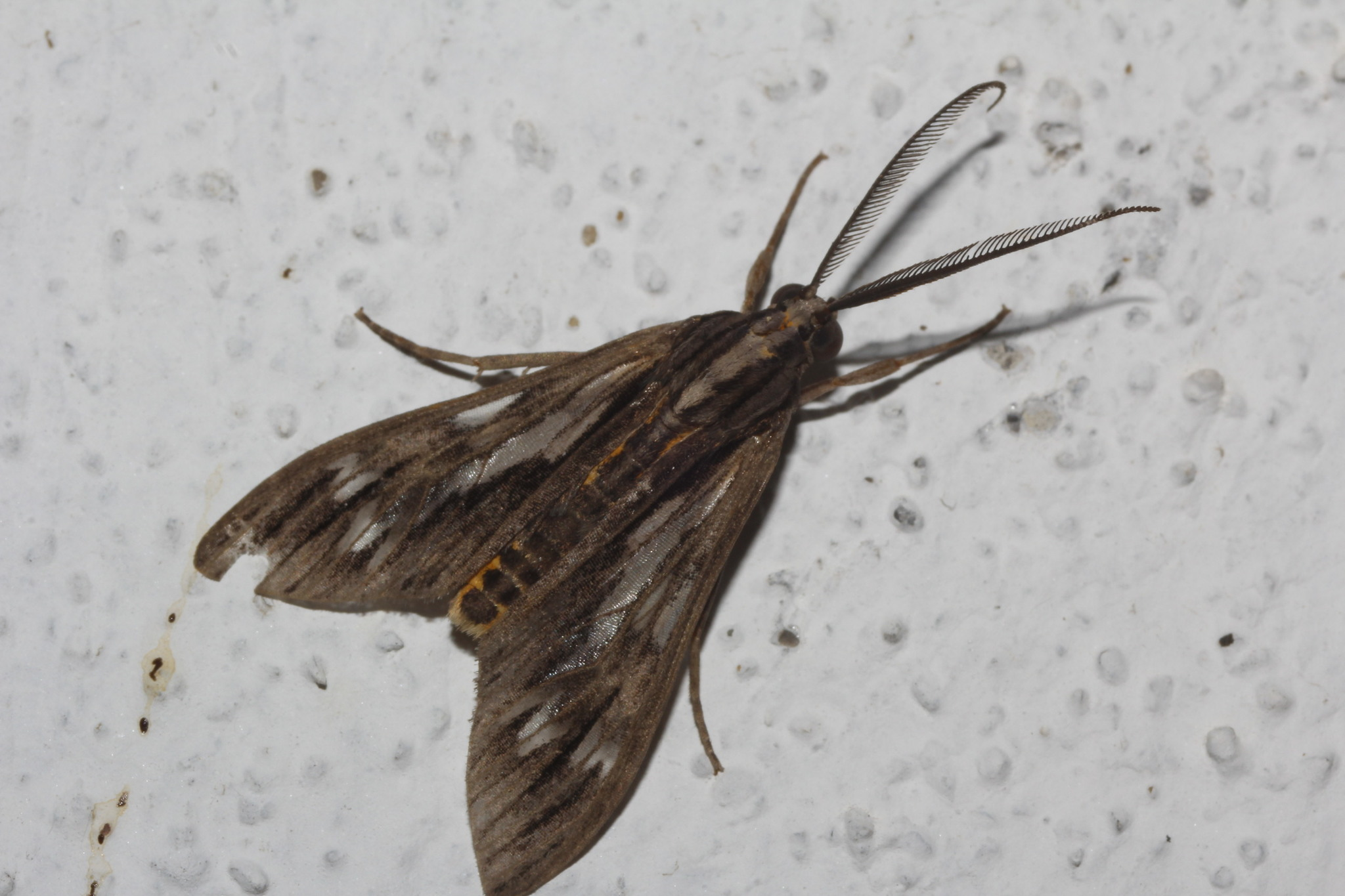

Scientific classification
- Kingdom: Animalia
- Phylum: Arthropoda
- Class: Insecta
- Order: Lepidoptera
- Superfamily: Noctuoidea
- Family: Erebidae
- Subfamily: Arctiinae
- Genus: Psilopleura
- Species: P. polia

Binomial name
- Psilopleura polia H. Druce, 1898

= Psilopleura polia =

Species of moth

Psilopleura polia is a species of moth in the subfamily Arctiinae. It was first described by Herbert Druce in 1898. It is found from southern Texas to Central America and Vanuatu.

The wingspan is about 38 mm. Adults have been recorded on wing in November in Texas.
