= Mevania albofasciata =

Scientific classification
- Domain: Eukaryota
- Kingdom: Animalia
- Phylum: Arthropoda
- Class: Insecta
- Order: Lepidoptera
- Superfamily: Noctuoidea
- Family: Erebidae
- Subfamily: Arctiinae
- Genus: Mevania
- Species: M. albofasciata

Binomial name
- Mevania albofasciata Rothschild, 1912

Species of moth

Mevania albofasciata is a moth of the subfamily Arctiinae. It was described by Rothschild in 1912. It is found in Peru.
