= Paraethria =

Scientific classification
- Kingdom: Animalia
- Phylum: Arthropoda
- Clade: Pancrustacea
- Class: Insecta
- Order: Lepidoptera
- Superfamily: Noctuoidea
- Family: Erebidae
- Subfamily: Arctiinae
- Genus: Paraethria; Hampson, 1898

Synonyms
- Gnophaela Herrich-Schäffer, [1855] (preocc. Walker, 1854)

Genus of moths

Paraethria is a genus of moth in the subfamily Arctiinae.

== Selected species ==
- Paraethria angustipennis Rothschild, 1911
- Paraethria flavosignata Rothschild, 1911
- Paraethria mapiria Draudt, 1915
- Paraethria triseriata Herrich-Schäffer, 1855
