= Anycles =

Scientific classification
- Kingdom: Animalia
- Phylum: Arthropoda
- Class: Insecta
- Order: Lepidoptera
- Superfamily: Noctuoidea
- Family: Erebidae
- Subfamily: Arctiinae
- Genus: Anycles; Walker, 1854

Synonyms
- Amycles Herrich-Schäffer, [1854]; Dipteromorpha Felder, 1874

Genus of moths

Anycles is a genus of moths in the subfamily Arctiinae. The genus was erected by Francis Walker in 1854.

== Species ==
- Anycles anthracina Walker, 1854
- Anycles brinkleyi Rothschild, 1912
- Anycles cupreus Schaus, 1901
- Anycles dolosus Walker, 1854 [dolorosa in original combination]
- Anycles tenebrosa Rothschild, 1912

Uncertain placement ? Anycles adjusta (Godman & Salvin, 1884) [in some scheme a synonym of Anycles anthracina
