= Mevania (moth) =

Scientific classification
- Kingdom: Animalia
- Phylum: Arthropoda
- Class: Insecta
- Order: Lepidoptera
- Superfamily: Noctuoidea
- Family: Erebidae
- Subfamily: Arctiinae
- Tribe: Ctenuchini
- Genus: Mevania; Walker, 1854

Genus of moths

Mevania is a genus of moths in the subfamily Arctiinae. The genus was erected by Francis Walker in 1854.

== Species ==
- Mevania albofasciata Rothschild, 1912
- Mevania basalis Walker, 1864
- Mevania larissa Druce, 1890
- Mevania quadricolor Walker, 1854
