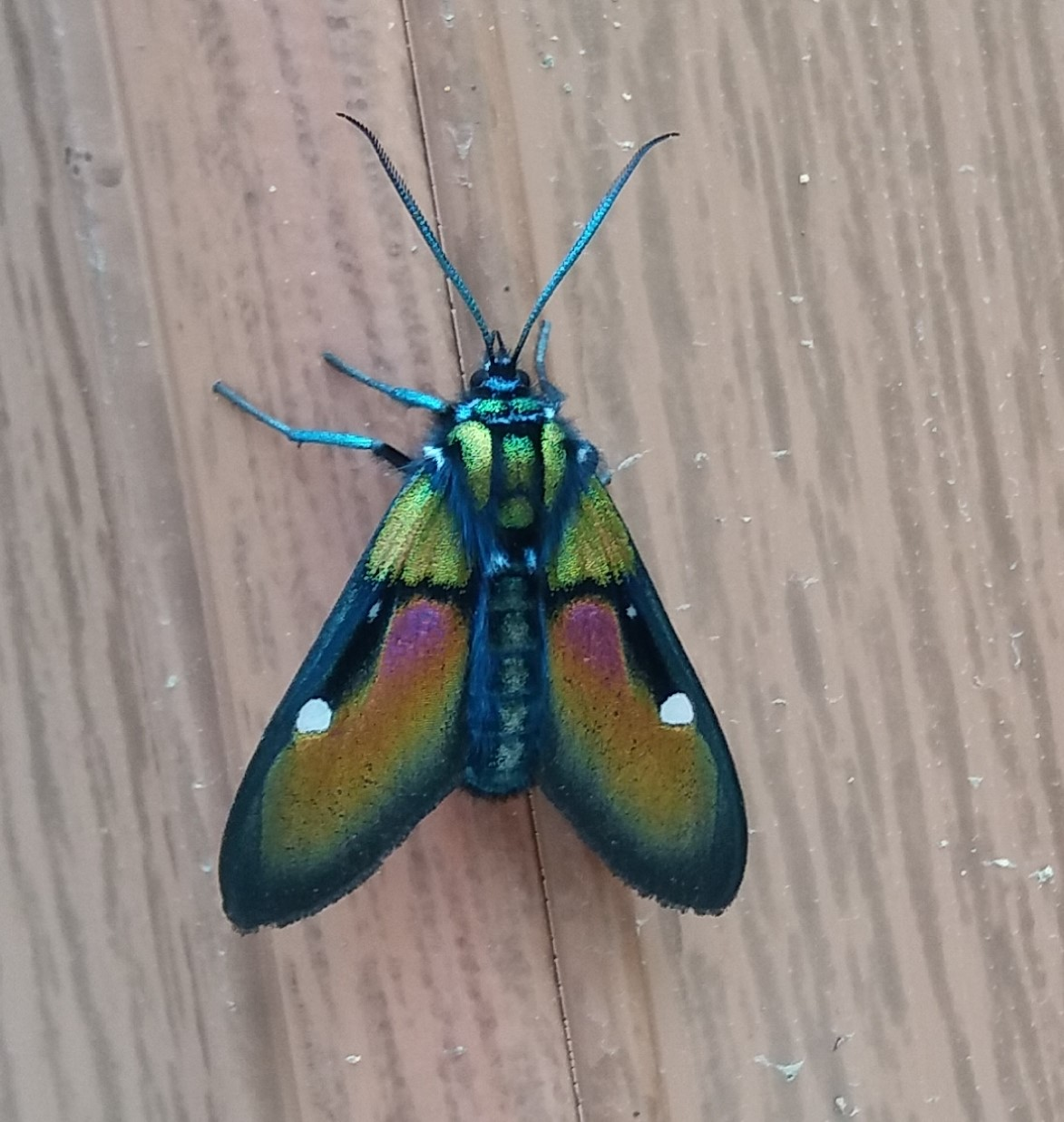
- Chrysocale ignita

Scientific classification
- Kingdom: Animalia
- Phylum: Arthropoda
- Class: Insecta
- Order: Lepidoptera
- Superfamily: Noctuoidea
- Family: Erebidae
- Subfamily: Arctiinae
- Genus: Chrysocale; Walker, 1854

= Chrysocale =

Genus of moths

Chrysocale is a genus of moths in the subfamily Arctiinae erected by Francis Walker in 1854.

== Species ==
Species	Image
Chrysocale betzi Viette, 1980	
Chrysocale corax Hampson, 1901	
Chrysocale ferens Schaus, 1896	
Chrysocale fletcheri Viette, 1980	
Chrysocale gigantea Druce, 1890	
Chrysocale gigas Rothschild, 1911	
Chrysocale ignita Herrich-Schäffer, 1853	
Chrysocale pava Dognin, 1893	
Chrysocale plebeja Herrich-Schäffer, 1853	
Chrysocale principalis Walker, 1864	
Chrysocale regalis Boisduval, 1836	
Chrysocale splendens Dognin, 1888	
Chrysocale uniformis Draudt, 1917	
