= Diptilon =

Scientific classification
- Domain: Eukaryota
- Kingdom: Animalia
- Phylum: Arthropoda
- Class: Insecta
- Order: Lepidoptera
- Superfamily: Noctuoidea
- Family: Erebidae
- Subfamily: Arctiinae
- Genus: Diptilon; Prittwitz, 1870

Synonyms
- Aethriopsis Schrottky, 1910

Genus of moths

Diptilon is a genus of moths in the subfamily Arctiinae. The genus was erected by Otto von Prittwitz in 1870.

== Species ==
- Diptilon aterea Schaus, 1901
- Diptilon aurantiipes Rothschild, 1911
- Diptilon bivittata Walker, 1864
- Diptilon chrysocraspis Hampson, 1898
- Diptilon crassa Zerny, 1912
- Diptilon culex Draudt, 1915
- Diptilon doeri Schaus, 1892
- Diptilon flavipalpis Hampson, 1911
- Diptilon gladia E. D. Jones, 1914
- Diptilon halterata Fabricius, 1775
- Diptilon hoffmannsi Rothschild, 1911
- Diptilon philocles Druce, 1896
- Diptilon proleuca Druce, 1905
- Diptilon sylpha Dognin, 1902
- Diptilon telamonophorum Prittwitz, 1870
