= Didasys =

Scientific classification
- Kingdom: Animalia
- Phylum: Arthropoda
- Class: Insecta
- Order: Lepidoptera
- Superfamily: Noctuoidea
- Family: Erebidae
- Subfamily: Arctiinae
- Genus: Didasys; Grote, 1875
- Species: D. belae

Binomial name
- Didasys belae Grote, 1875

Genus of moths

Didasys is a monotypic tiger moth genus in the family Erebidae. The genus contains the single species Didasys belae, the double-tufted wasp moth, which is found in the US states of Florida and Alabama. Both the genus and species were first described by Augustus Radcliffe Grote in 1875.
