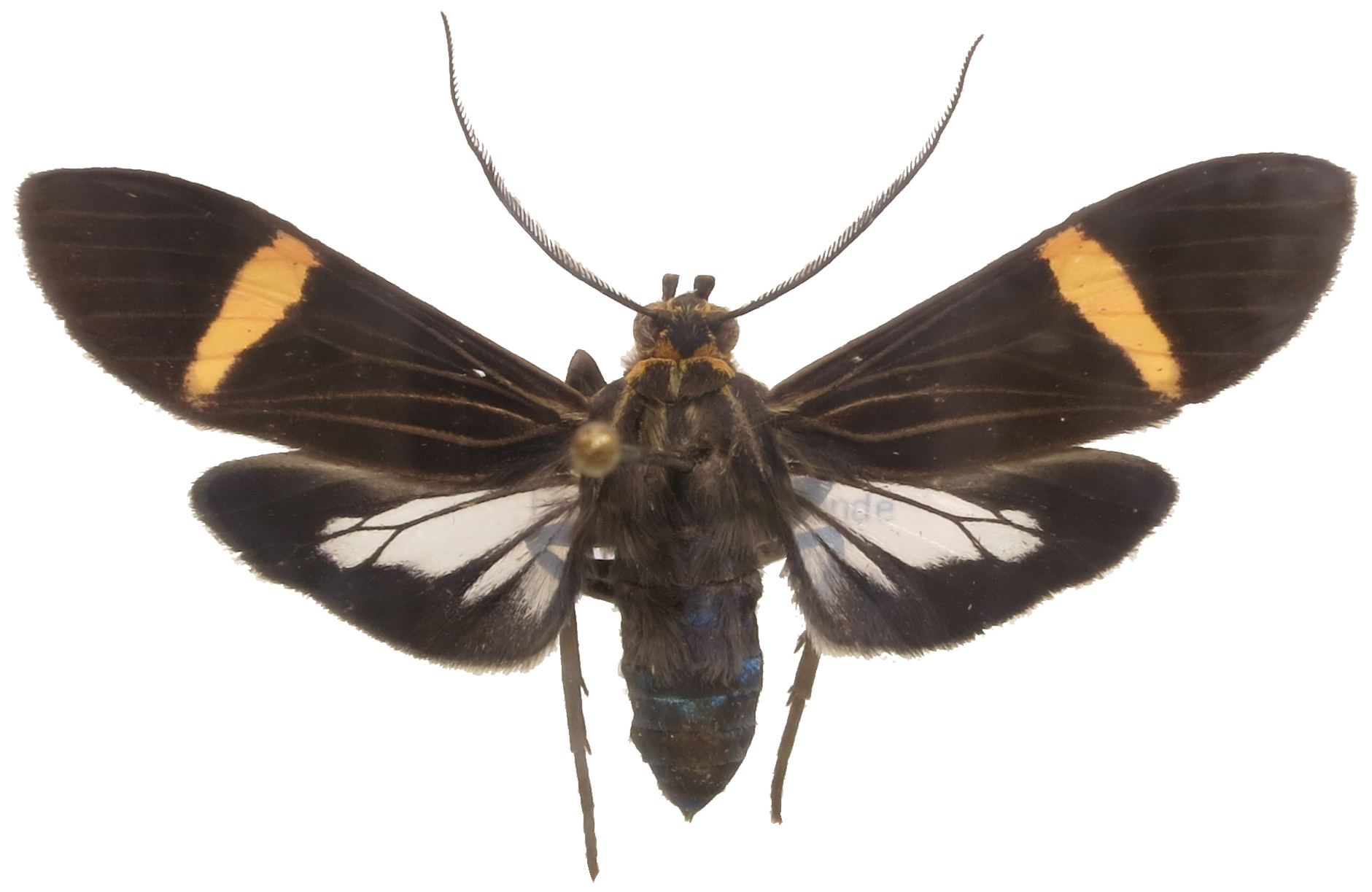

Scientific classification
- Kingdom: Animalia
- Phylum: Arthropoda
- Clade: Pancrustacea
- Class: Insecta
- Order: Lepidoptera
- Superfamily: Noctuoidea
- Family: Erebidae
- Subfamily: Arctiinae
- Subtribe: Ctenuchina
- Genus: Aclytia; Hübner, 1819

Synonyms
- Percote Walker, 1854

= Aclytia =

Genus of moths

Aclytia is a genus of tiger moths in the family Erebidae. The genus was erected by Jacob Hübner in 1819.

== Species ==
- Aclytia albistriga Schaus, 1910
- Aclytia apicalis Walker, 1854
- Aclytia bractea Moschler, 1877
- Aclytia coerulonitans Rothschild, 1912
- Aclytia conjecturalis Draudt, 1930
- Aclytia flavicaput Rothschild, 1912
- Aclytia flavigutta Walker, 1854
- Aclytia gynamorpha Hampson, 1898
- Aclytia heber Cramer, 1872
- Aclytia hoffmannsi Rothschild, 1912
- Aclytia jonesi Rothschild, 1912
- Aclytia klagesi Rothschild, 1912
- Aclytia leucaspila Fleming, 1959
- Aclytia mariamne Druce, 1855
- Aclytia mictochroa Hampson, 1914
- Aclytia modesta Kohler, 1924
- Aclytia petraea Schaus, 1892
- Aclytia punctata Butler, 1876
- Aclytia pydna Druce, 1899
- Aclytia reducta Rothschild, 1912
- Aclytia signatura Walker, 1854
- Aclytia superbior Strand
- Aclytia terra Schaus, 1896
- Aclytia ventralis Guérin-Méneville, 1843
