= Cisseps packardii =

Scientific classification
- Kingdom: Animalia
- Phylum: Arthropoda
- Clade: Pancrustacea
- Class: Insecta
- Order: Lepidoptera
- Superfamily: Noctuoidea
- Family: Erebidae
- Subfamily: Arctiinae
- Genus: Cisseps
- Species: C. packardii

Binomial name
- Cisseps packardii (Grote, 1865)

Synonyms
- Scepsis packardii Grote, 1865; Scepsis matthewi H. Edwards, 1873; Scepsis packardii cocklei Dyar, 1904

Species of moth

Cisseps packardii is a moth of the subfamily Arctiinae. It was described by Augustus Radcliffe Grote in 1865. It is found in North America from California to Manitoba.

The North American Moth Photographer's Group and BugGuide have this name as a synonym of Cisseps fulvicollis, but it is listed as a species by Lepidoptera and Some Other Life Forms.
