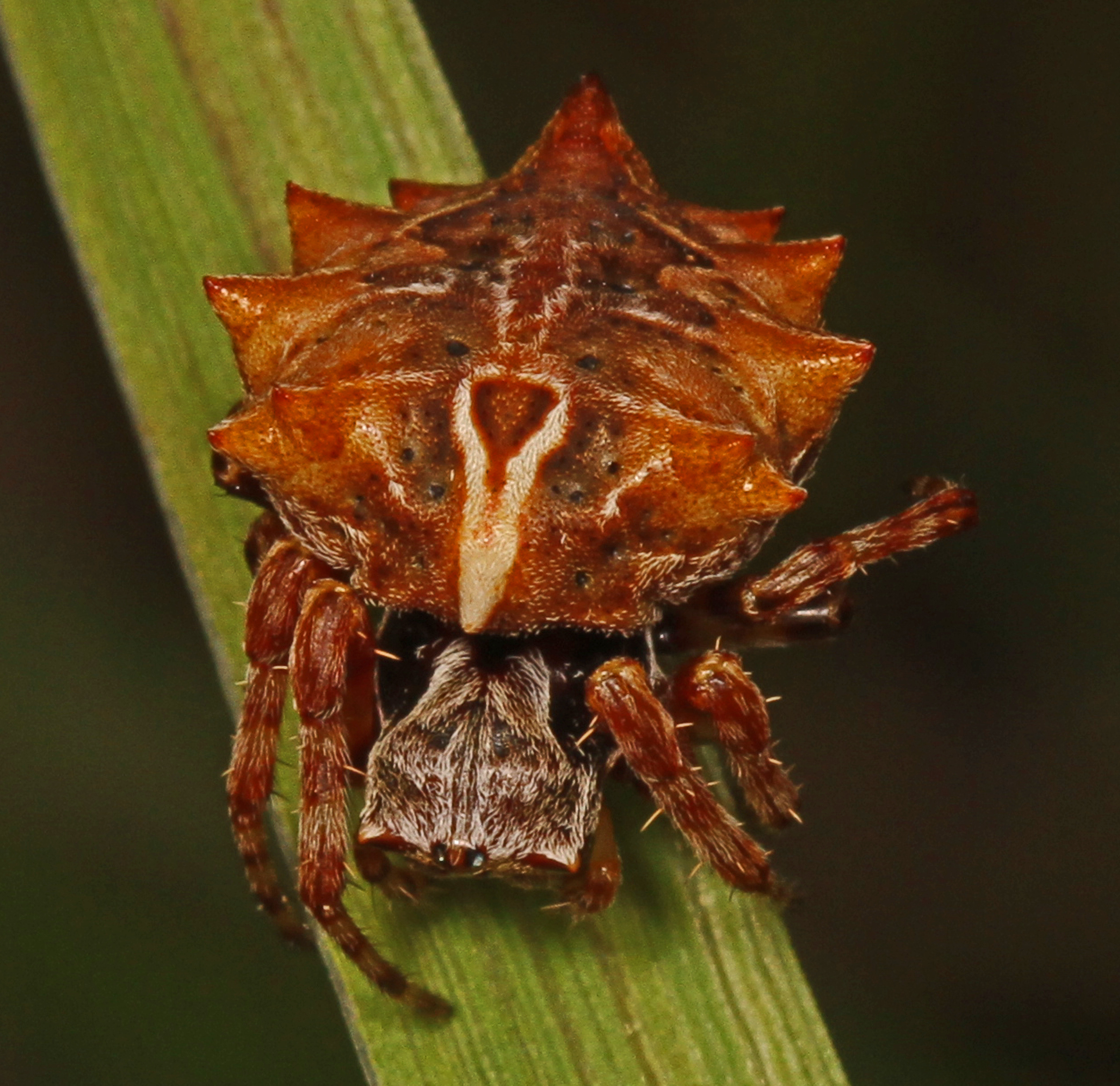
- A. stellata in North America
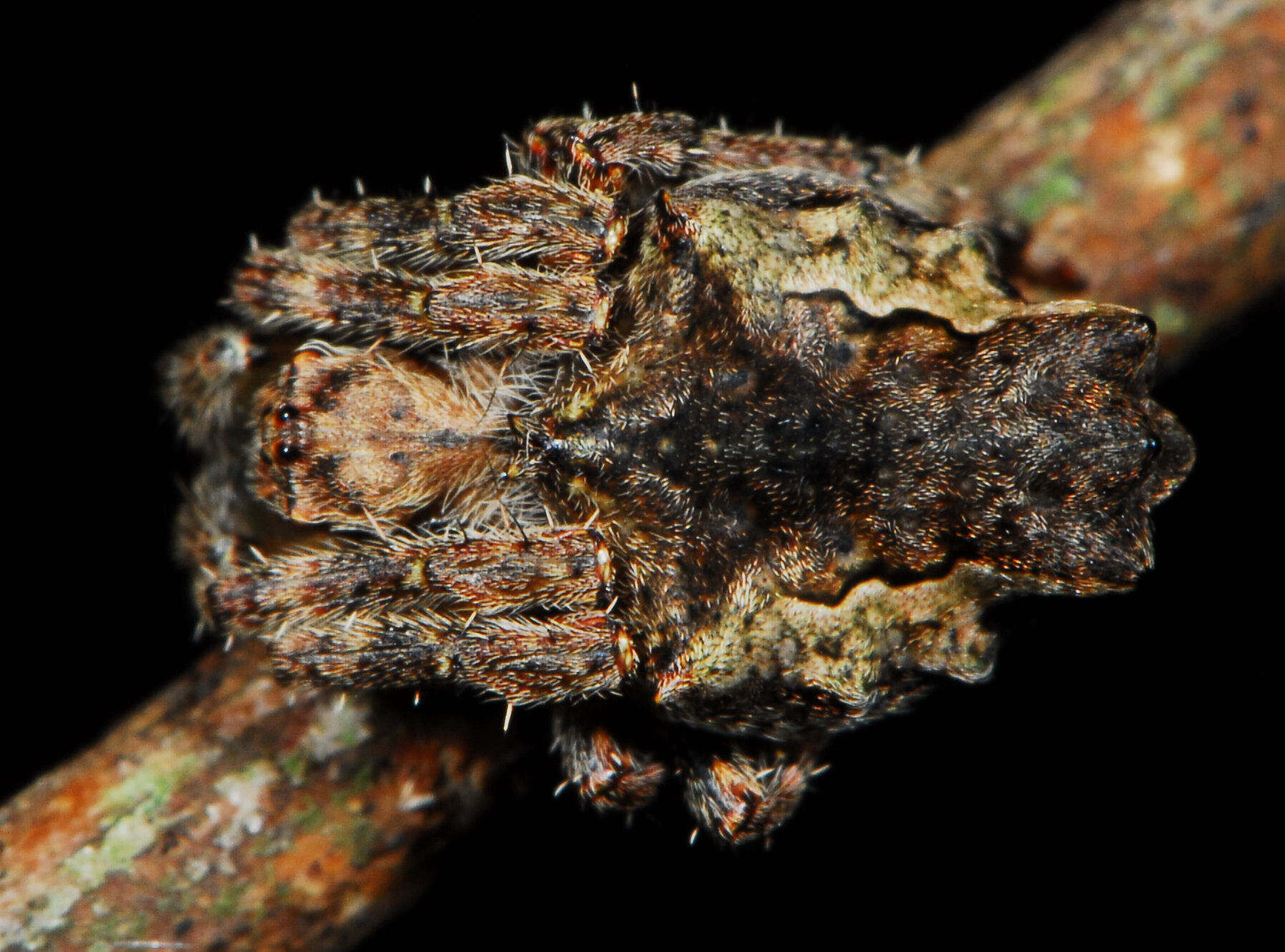
- male Acanthepeira sp. in South Africa

Scientific classification
- Kingdom: Animalia
- Phylum: Arthropoda
- Subphylum: Chelicerata
- Class: Arachnida
- Order: Araneae
- Infraorder: Araneomorphae
- Family: Araneidae
- Genus: Acanthepeira; Marx, 1883

Type species
- A. stellata (Walckenaer, 1805)

Species
- 5, see text

= Acanthepeira =

Genus of spiders

Acanthepeira is a genus of orb-weaver spiders first described by George Marx in 1883.

== Species ==
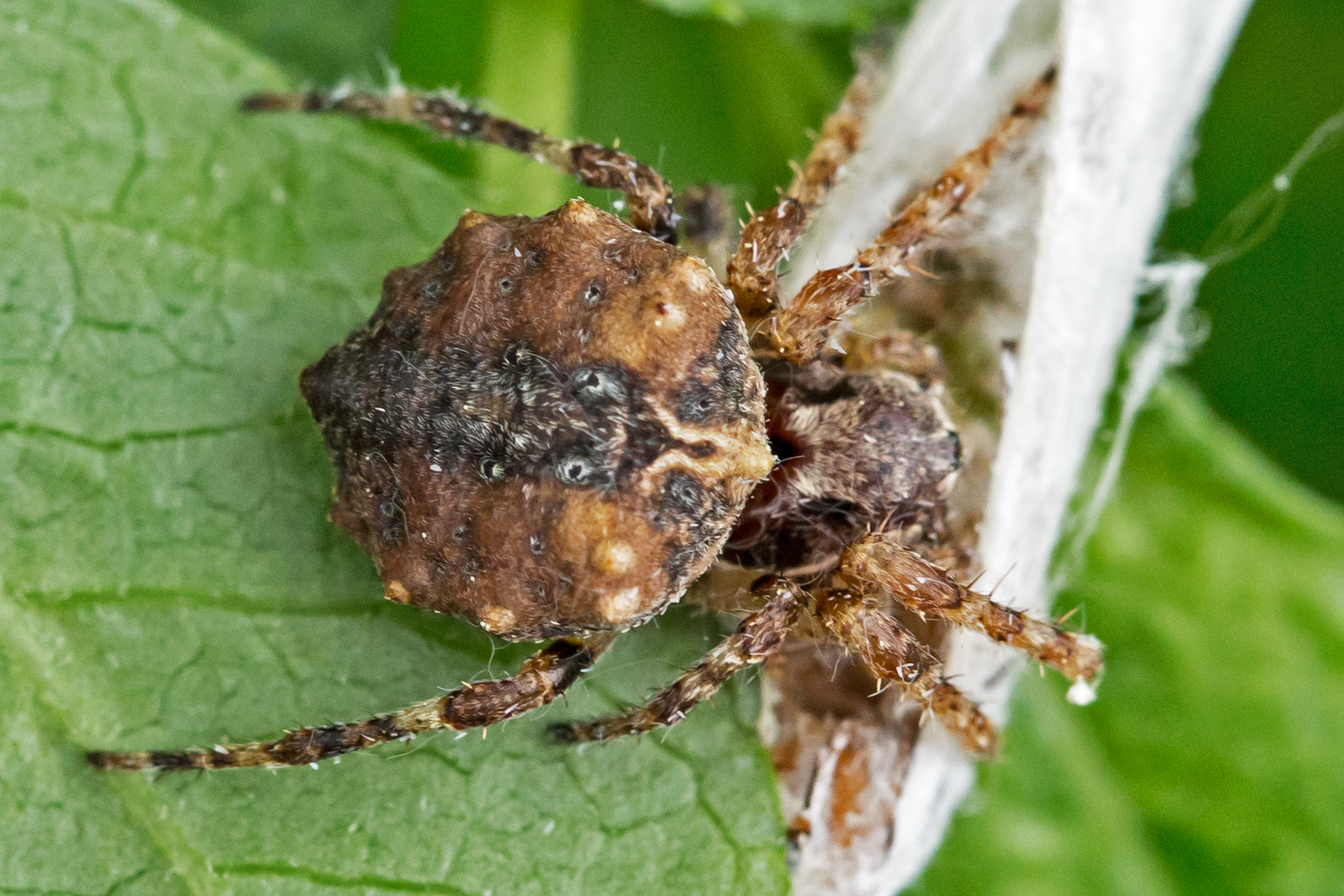
A. cherokee

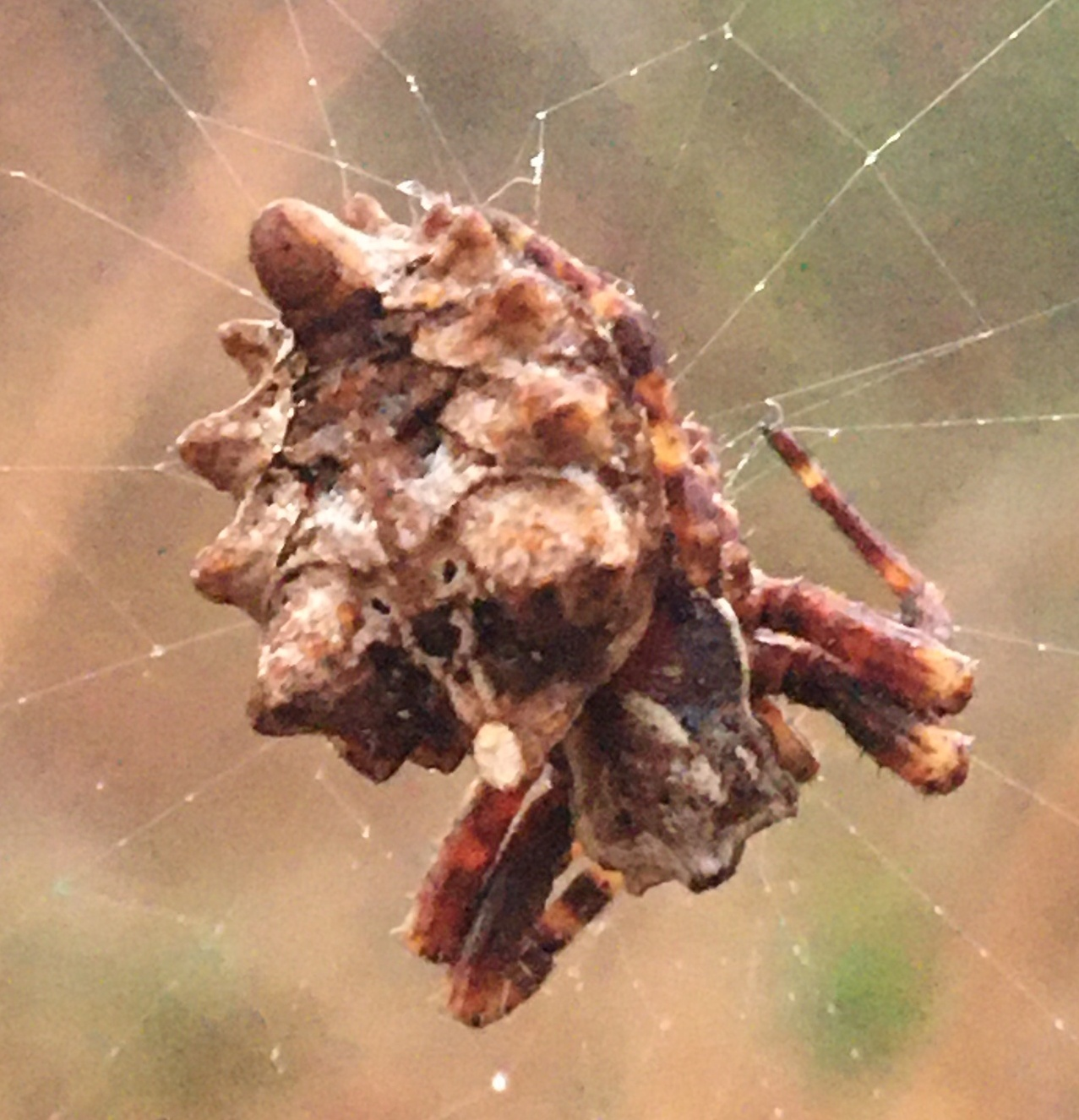
A. marion

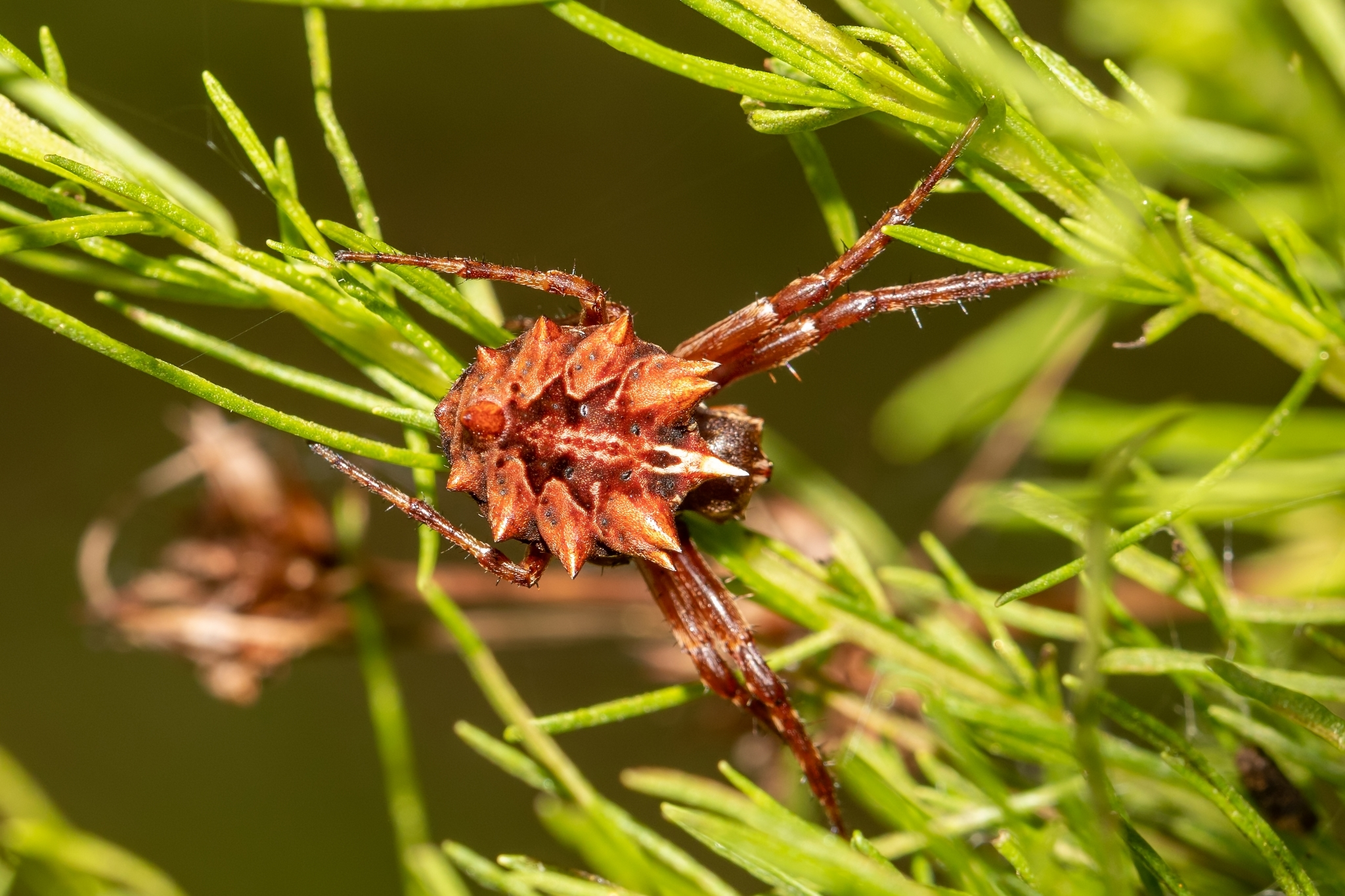
A. venusta

As of October 2026, this genus includes five species:

- Acanthepeira cherokee Levi, 1976 – United States
- Acanthepeira labidura (Mello-Leitão, 1943) – Brazil
- Acanthepeira marion Levi, 1976 – United States, Mexico
- Acanthepeira stellata (Walckenaer, 1805) – Canada, United States, Mexico
- Acanthepeira venusta (Banks, 1896) – United States, Cuba, Hispaniola

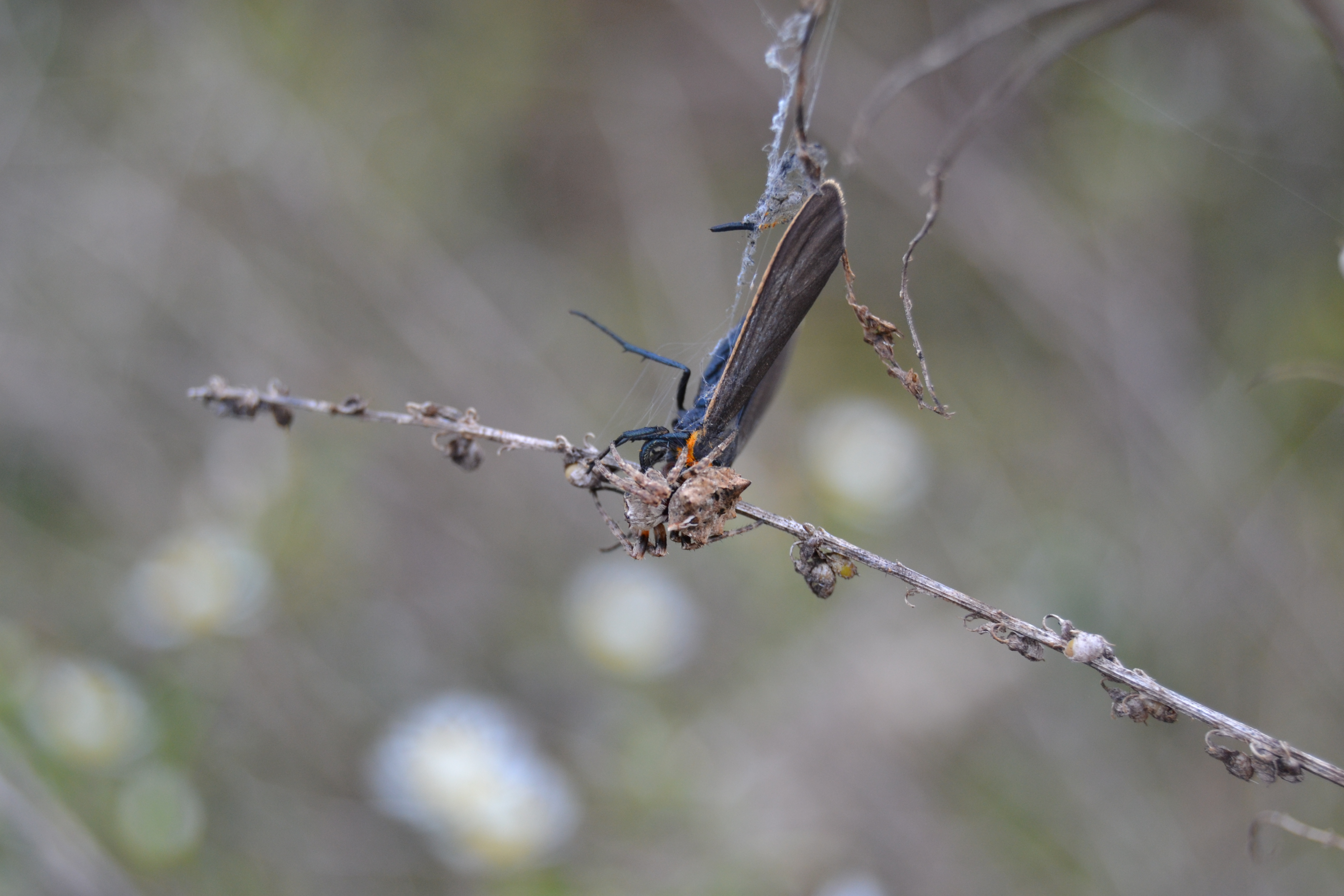
A. stellata feeding on Cisseps fulvicollis
