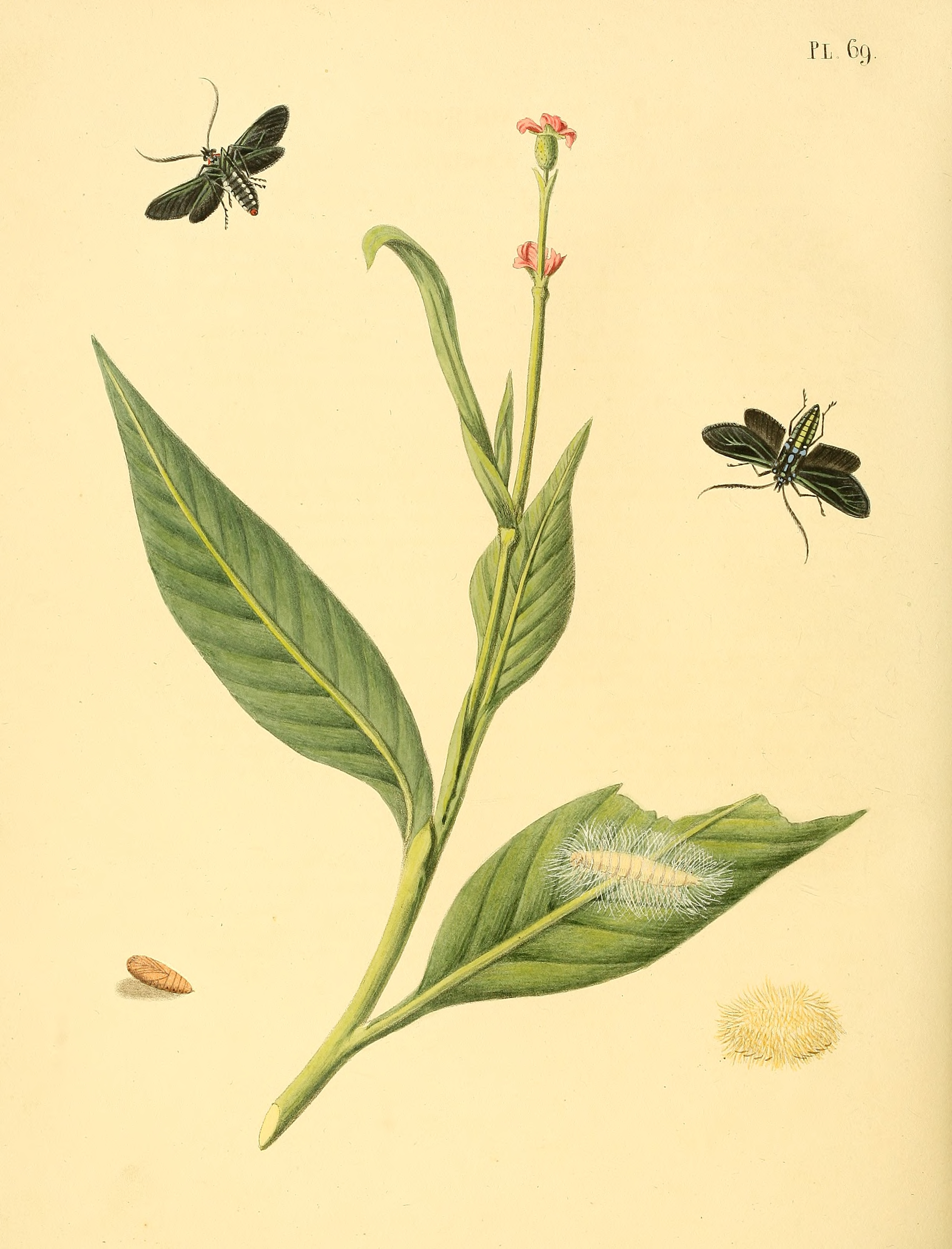
- Antichloris eriphia

Scientific classification
- Kingdom: Animalia
- Phylum: Arthropoda
- Clade: Pancrustacea
- Class: Insecta
- Order: Lepidoptera
- Superfamily: Noctuoidea
- Family: Erebidae
- Subfamily: Arctiinae
- Subtribe: Ctenuchina
- Genus: Antichloris; Hübner, 1818

Synonyms
- Illipula Walker, 1854; Copaena Herrich-Schäffer, [1855]; Eriphia Herrich-Schäffer, [1855]; Eriphia Herrich-Schäffer, [1856]

= Antichloris =

Genus of moths

Antichloris is a genus of tiger moths in the family Erebidae. The genus was erected by Jacob Hübner in 1818.

== Species ==
- Antichloris affinis (Rothschild, 1912)
- Antichloris caca Hübner, 1818
- Antichloris clementi Schaus, 1938
- Antichloris eriphia (Fabricius, 1777)
- Antichloris flammea Dognin, 1891
- Antichloris ornata (H. Druce, 1883)
- Antichloris scudderii Butler, 1876
- Antichloris viridis H. Druce, 1884
