= Aclytia pydna =

Scientific classification
- Domain: Eukaryota
- Kingdom: Animalia
- Phylum: Arthropoda
- Class: Insecta
- Order: Lepidoptera
- Superfamily: Noctuoidea
- Family: Erebidae
- Subfamily: Arctiinae
- Genus: Aclytia
- Species: A. pydna

Binomial name
- Aclytia pydna H. Druce, 1899

Species of moth

Aclytia pydna is a moth of the family Erebidae. It was described by Herbert Druce in 1899. It is found in Ecuador.
