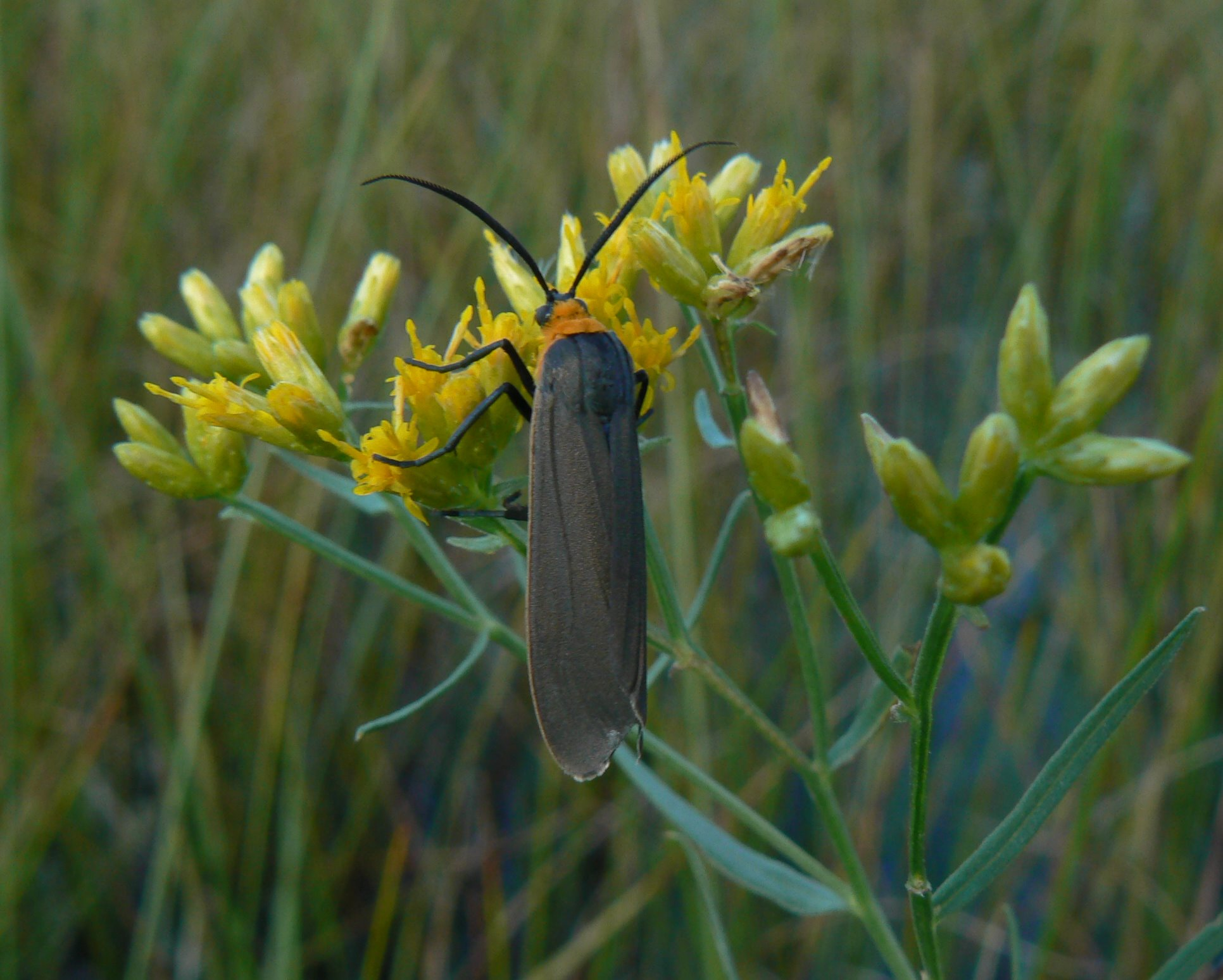
- Cisseps fulvicollis

Scientific classification
- Domain: Eukaryota
- Kingdom: Animalia
- Phylum: Arthropoda
- Class: Insecta
- Order: Lepidoptera
- Superfamily: Noctuoidea
- Family: Erebidae
- Subfamily: Arctiinae
- Subtribe: Ctenuchina
- Genus: Cisseps; Franclemont, 1936

Synonyms
- Scepsis Walker, 1854

= Cisseps =

Genus of moths

Cisseps is a genus of moths in the family Erebidae erected by John G. Franclemont in 1936.

== Species ==
- Cisseps fulvicollis (Hübner, [1818]) – yellow-collared scape moth
- Cisseps packardii (Grote, 1865)
- Cisseps wrightii (Stretch, 1885)
