= Isia cornuta =

Scientific classification
- Kingdom: Animalia
- Phylum: Arthropoda
- Clade: Pancrustacea
- Class: Insecta
- Order: Lepidoptera
- Superfamily: Noctuoidea
- Family: Erebidae
- Subfamily: Arctiinae
- Genus: Isia
- Species: I. cornuta

Binomial name
- Isia cornuta Travassos, 1947

Species of moth

Isia cornuta is a moth of the subfamily Arctiinae. It was described by Travassos in 1947. It is found in Brazil.
