= Aclytia bractea =

Scientific classification
- Kingdom: Animalia
- Phylum: Arthropoda
- Class: Insecta
- Order: Lepidoptera
- Superfamily: Noctuoidea
- Family: Erebidae
- Subfamily: Arctiinae
- Genus: Aclytia
- Species: A. bractea

Binomial name
- Aclytia bractea (Moschler, 1877)

Synonyms
- Sciopsyche bractea Möschler, 1878; Aclytia affinis Rothschild, 1912

Species of moth

Aclytia bractea is a moth of the family Erebidae. It was described by Heinrich Benno Möschler in 1877. It is found in Suriname.
