= Aclytia flavigutta =

Scientific classification
- Kingdom: Animalia
- Phylum: Arthropoda
- Class: Insecta
- Order: Lepidoptera
- Superfamily: Noctuoidea
- Family: Erebidae
- Subfamily: Arctiinae
- Genus: Aclytia
- Species: A. flavigutta

Binomial name
- Aclytia flavigutta (Walker, 1854)

Synonyms
- Euchromia flavigutta Walker, 1854; Pelochyta simulatrix Walker, [1865]

Species of moth

Aclytia flavigutta is a moth of the family Erebidae. It was described by Francis Walker in 1854. It is found in São Paulo, Brazil.
