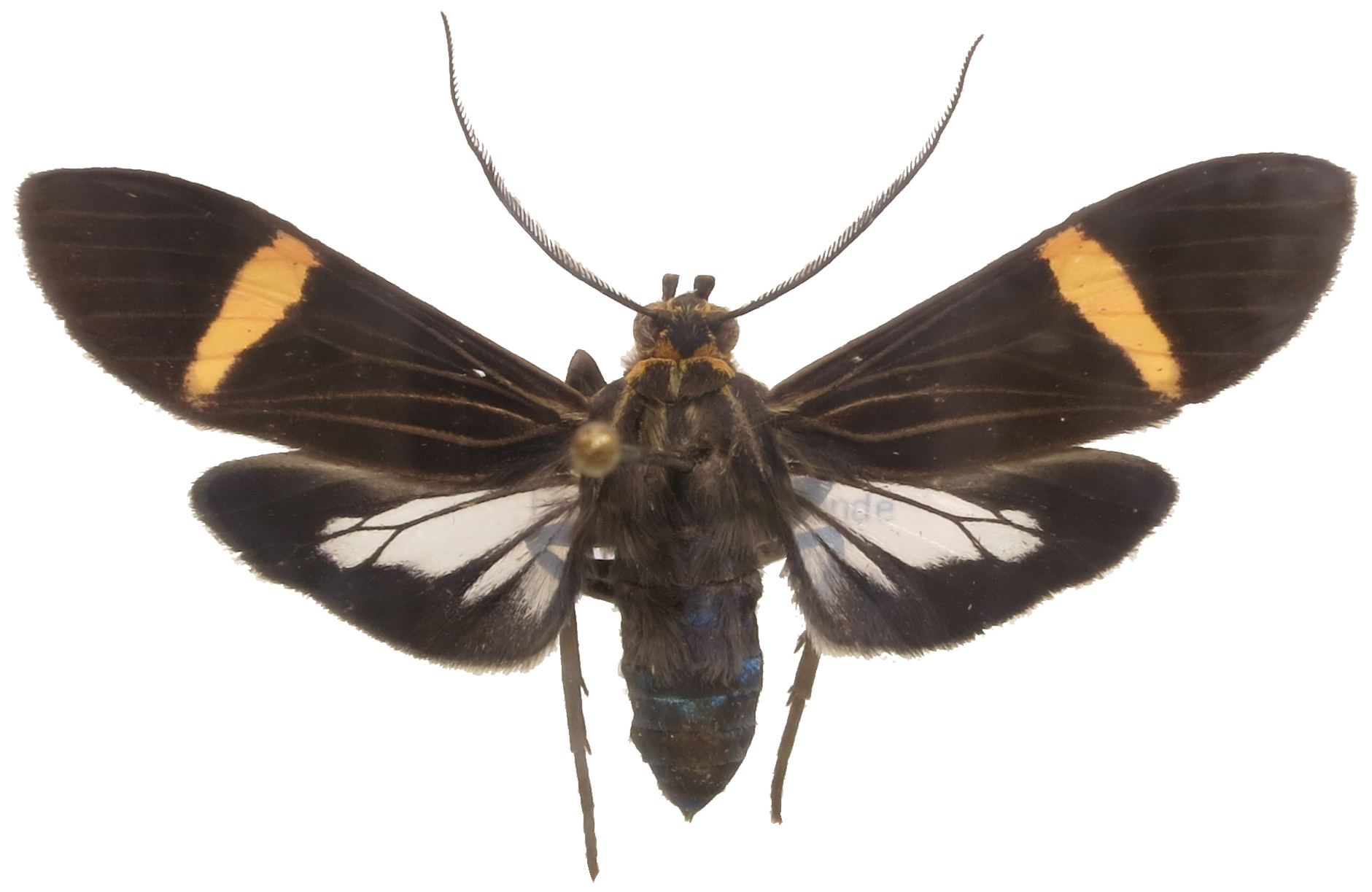
- From French Guiana

Scientific classification
- Kingdom: Animalia
- Phylum: Arthropoda
- Class: Insecta
- Order: Lepidoptera
- Superfamily: Noctuoidea
- Family: Erebidae
- Subfamily: Arctiinae
- Genus: Aclytia
- Species: A. gynamorpha

Binomial name
- Aclytia gynamorpha Hampson, 1898

Synonyms
- Aclytia flavigutta Butler, 1877

= Aclytia gynamorpha =

Species of moth

Aclytia gynamorpha is a moth of the family Erebidae. It was described by George Hampson in 1898. It is found in Peru, Costa Rica, French Guiana and the Brazilian states of Amazonas and Pará.
