= Aclytia punctata =

Scientific classification
- Domain: Eukaryota
- Kingdom: Animalia
- Phylum: Arthropoda
- Class: Insecta
- Order: Lepidoptera
- Superfamily: Noctuoidea
- Family: Erebidae
- Subfamily: Arctiinae
- Genus: Aclytia
- Species: A. punctata

Binomial name
- Aclytia punctata Butler, 1876

Species of moth

Aclytia punctata is a moth of the family Erebidae. It was described by Arthur Gardiner Butler in 1876. It is found in Honduras, Guatemala, Costa Rica and Brazil (Pará).
