= Antichloris ornata =

Scientific classification
- Domain: Eukaryota
- Kingdom: Animalia
- Phylum: Arthropoda
- Class: Insecta
- Order: Lepidoptera
- Superfamily: Noctuoidea
- Family: Erebidae
- Subfamily: Arctiinae
- Genus: Antichloris
- Species: A. ornata

Binomial name
- Antichloris ornata (H. Druce, 1883)

Synonyms
- Illipula ornata H. Druce, 1883

Species of moth

Antichloris ornata is a moth of the family Erebidae. It was described by Herbert Druce in 1883. It is found in Ecuador, Bolivia and Colombia.
