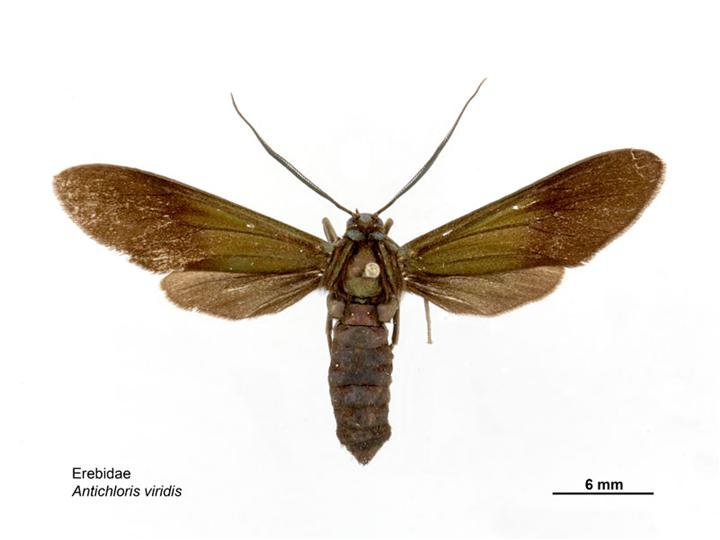
- Dorsal view
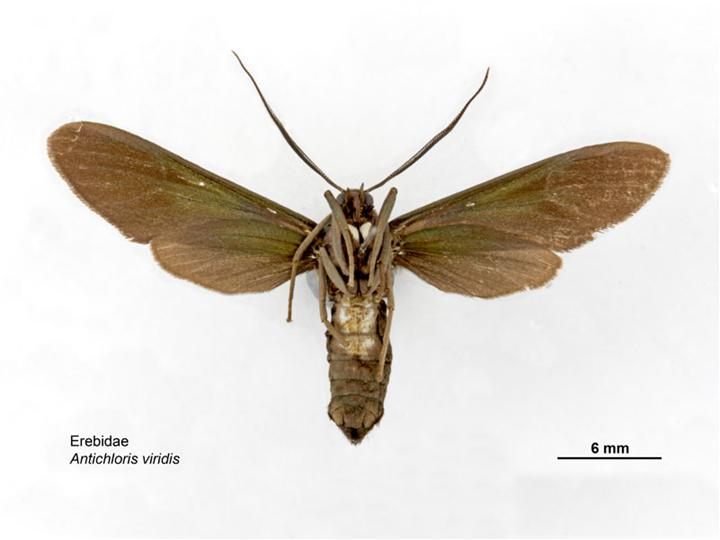
- Ventral view

Scientific classification
- Domain: Eukaryota
- Kingdom: Animalia
- Phylum: Arthropoda
- Class: Insecta
- Order: Lepidoptera
- Superfamily: Noctuoidea
- Family: Erebidae
- Subfamily: Arctiinae
- Genus: Antichloris
- Species: A. viridis

Binomial name
- Antichloris viridis H. Druce, 1884

Synonyms
- Ceramidia musicola Cockerell, 1910; Ceramidia cyanopasta Dognin, 1911; Ceramidia scintillocollaris Rothschild, 1912; Ceramidia caerulescens Draudt, 1917; Ceramidia importata Strand, 1920

= Antichloris viridis =

Species of moth

Antichloris viridis, the satin stowaway or banana moth, is a moth of the family Erebidae. The species was first described by Herbert Druce in 1884. It is found in Colombia, Panama, Nicaragua and Venezuela. It has also been observed a number of times in Great Britain, after being accidentally imported in fruit consignments.

The larvae feed on banana, and are considered a serious pest in some areas.
