= Antichloris flammea =

Scientific classification
- Domain: Eukaryota
- Kingdom: Animalia
- Phylum: Arthropoda
- Class: Insecta
- Order: Lepidoptera
- Superfamily: Noctuoidea
- Family: Erebidae
- Subfamily: Arctiinae
- Genus: Antichloris
- Species: A. flammea

Binomial name
- Antichloris flammea Dognin, 1891

Species of moth

Antichloris flammea is a moth of the family Erebidae. It was described by Paul Dognin in 1891. It is found in Ecuador, Bolivia and Colombia.
