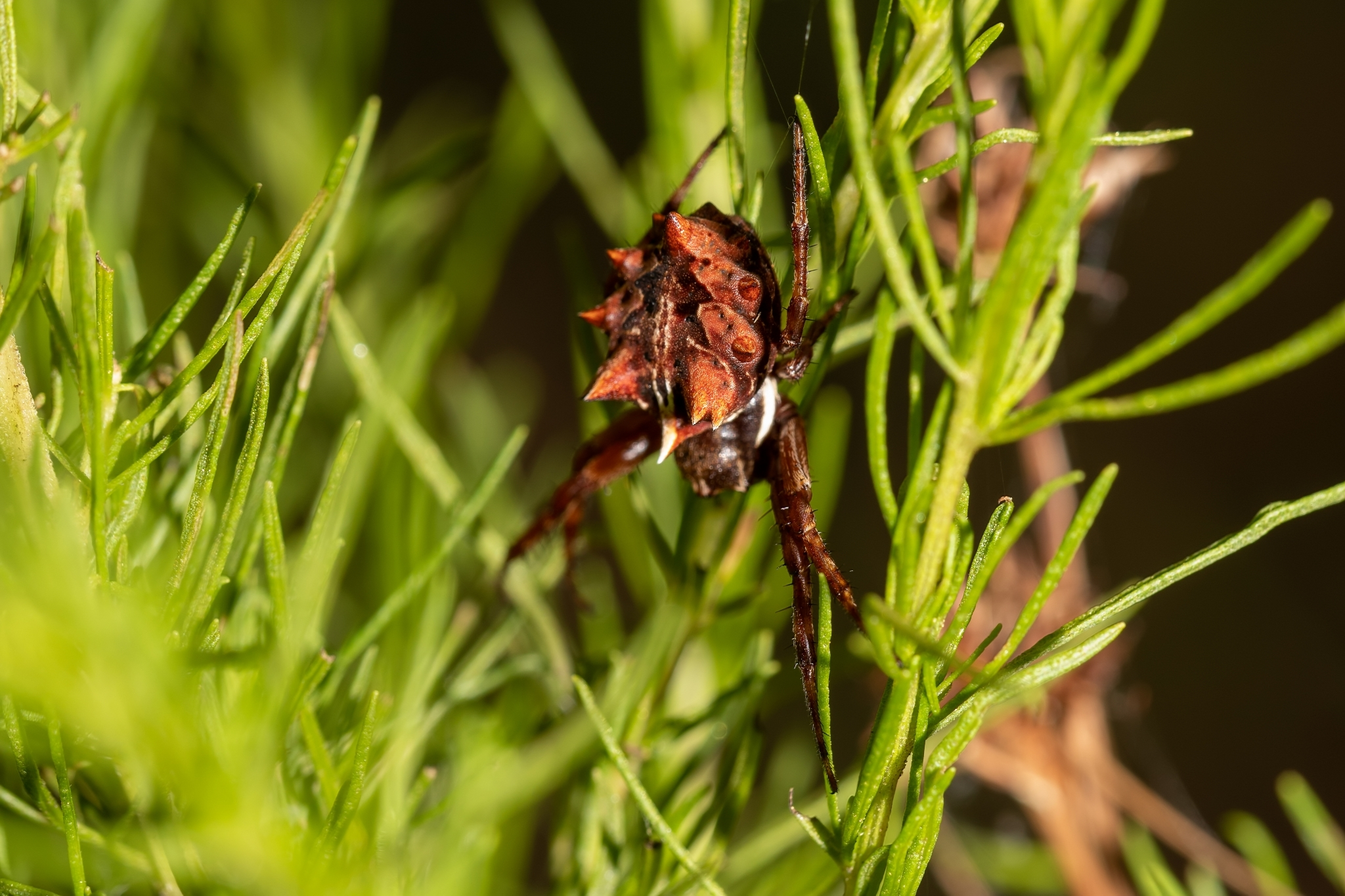

Scientific classification
- Domain: Eukaryota
- Kingdom: Animalia
- Phylum: Arthropoda
- Subphylum: Chelicerata
- Class: Arachnida
- Order: Araneae
- Infraorder: Araneomorphae
- Family: Araneidae
- Genus: Acanthepeira
- Species: A. venusta

Binomial name
- Acanthepeira venusta (Banks, 1896)

= Acanthepeira venusta =

Species of spider

Acanthepeira venusta is a species of orb weaver in the spider family Araneidae. It is found in the United States, Cuba, and Hispaniola.

Females produce clutches containing approximately 232 eggs. Each egg measures about 0.88 mm in diameter and weighs around 0.34 mg. The average female body mass is about 182.0 mg.
