= Antichloris scudderii =

Scientific classification
- Domain: Eukaryota
- Kingdom: Animalia
- Phylum: Arthropoda
- Class: Insecta
- Order: Lepidoptera
- Superfamily: Noctuoidea
- Family: Erebidae
- Subfamily: Arctiinae
- Genus: Antichloris
- Species: A. scudderii

Binomial name
- Antichloris scudderii Butler, 1876

Species of moth

Antichloris scudderii is a moth of the family Erebidae. It was described by Arthur Gardiner Butler in 1876. It is found in the Amazon basin.
