= Aclytia conjecturalis =

Scientific classification
- Domain: Eukaryota
- Kingdom: Animalia
- Phylum: Arthropoda
- Class: Insecta
- Order: Lepidoptera
- Superfamily: Noctuoidea
- Family: Erebidae
- Subfamily: Arctiinae
- Genus: Aclytia
- Species: A. conjecturalis

Binomial name
- Aclytia conjecturalis Draudt, 1930

Species of moth

Aclytia conjecturalis is a moth of the family Erebidae. It was described by Max Wilhelm Karl Draudt in 1930. It is found in Brazil.
