= Belemniastis whiteleyi =

Scientific classification
- Domain: Eukaryota
- Kingdom: Animalia
- Phylum: Arthropoda
- Class: Insecta
- Order: Lepidoptera
- Superfamily: Noctuoidea
- Family: Erebidae
- Subfamily: Arctiinae
- Genus: Belemniastis
- Species: B. whiteleyi

Binomial name
- Belemniastis whiteleyi (H. Druce, 1888)

Synonyms
- Belemnia whiteleyi H. Druce, 1888

Species of moth

Belemniastis whiteleyi is a moth of the subfamily Arctiinae. It was described by Herbert Druce in 1888. It is found in Guyana and Amazonas.
