= Antichloris affinis =

Scientific classification
- Domain: Eukaryota
- Kingdom: Animalia
- Phylum: Arthropoda
- Class: Insecta
- Order: Lepidoptera
- Superfamily: Noctuoidea
- Family: Erebidae
- Subfamily: Arctiinae
- Genus: Antichloris
- Species: A. affinis

Binomial name
- Antichloris affinis (Rothschild, 1912)

Synonyms
- Ceramidia affinis Rothschild, 1912; Antichloris atrinervis Rothschild, 1912

Species of moth

Antichloris affinis is a moth of the family Erebidae. It was described by Walter Rothschild in 1912. It was described from Tefé in the Amazon basin.
