= Aclytia jonesi =

Scientific classification
- Domain: Eukaryota
- Kingdom: Animalia
- Phylum: Arthropoda
- Class: Insecta
- Order: Lepidoptera
- Superfamily: Noctuoidea
- Family: Erebidae
- Subfamily: Arctiinae
- Genus: Aclytia
- Species: A. jonesi

Binomial name
- Aclytia jonesi Rothschild, 1912

Species of moth

Aclytia jonesi is a moth of the family Erebidae. It was described by Walter Rothschild in 1912. It is found in Brazil.
