= Aclytia signatura =

Scientific classification
- Kingdom: Animalia
- Phylum: Arthropoda
- Class: Insecta
- Order: Lepidoptera
- Superfamily: Noctuoidea
- Family: Erebidae
- Subfamily: Arctiinae
- Genus: Aclytia
- Species: A. signatura

Binomial name
- Aclytia signatura (Walker, 1854)

Synonyms
- Percote signatura Walker, 1854

Species of insect

Aclytia signatura is a moth of the family Erebidae. It was described by Francis Walker in 1854. It is found in the West Indies.
