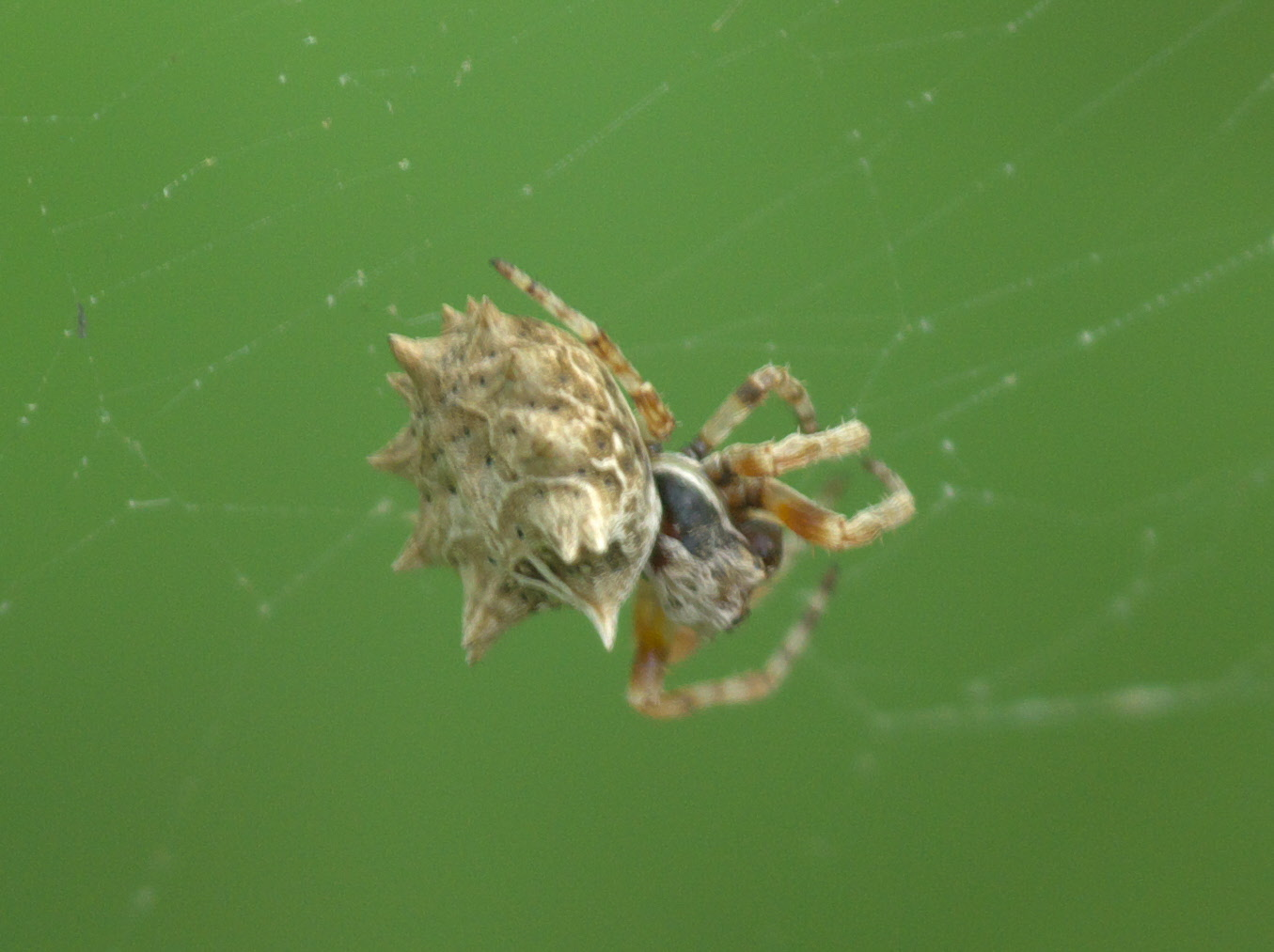

Scientific classification
- Domain: Eukaryota
- Kingdom: Animalia
- Phylum: Arthropoda
- Subphylum: Chelicerata
- Class: Arachnida
- Order: Araneae
- Infraorder: Araneomorphae
- Family: Araneidae
- Genus: Acanthepeira
- Species: A. stellata

Binomial name
- Acanthepeira stellata (Walckenaer, 1805)

= Acanthepeira stellata =

Species of spider

Acanthepeira stellata, known generally as the starbellied orbweaver or starbellied spider, is a species of orb weaver in the spider family Araneidae. It is found in a range from Canada to Mexico. It is most commonly found along the Eastern and Western coastline of North America.

== Description ==
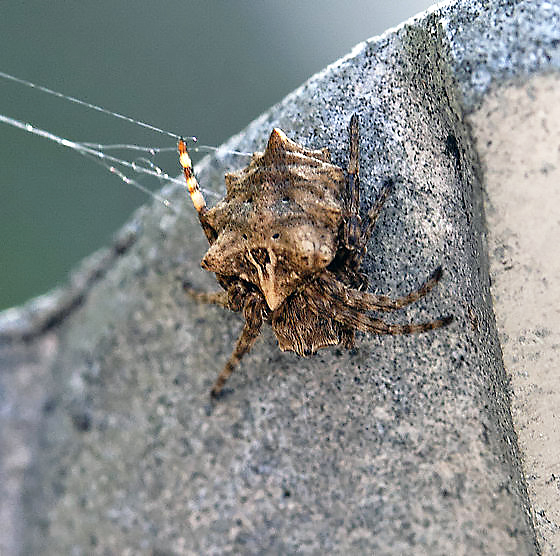
Starbellied Orbweaver (Acanthepeira stellata)

The abdomen of the starbellied orbweaver is covered with several spikes that have inspired its name. Like other orb weaver spiders, it is nocturnal and creates vertical webs to catch flying insects.

== Reproduction ==
Females produce clutches containing approximately 574 eggs. Each egg measures about 1.04 mm in diameter and weighs around 0.55 mg. The average female body mass is about 596.0 mg.

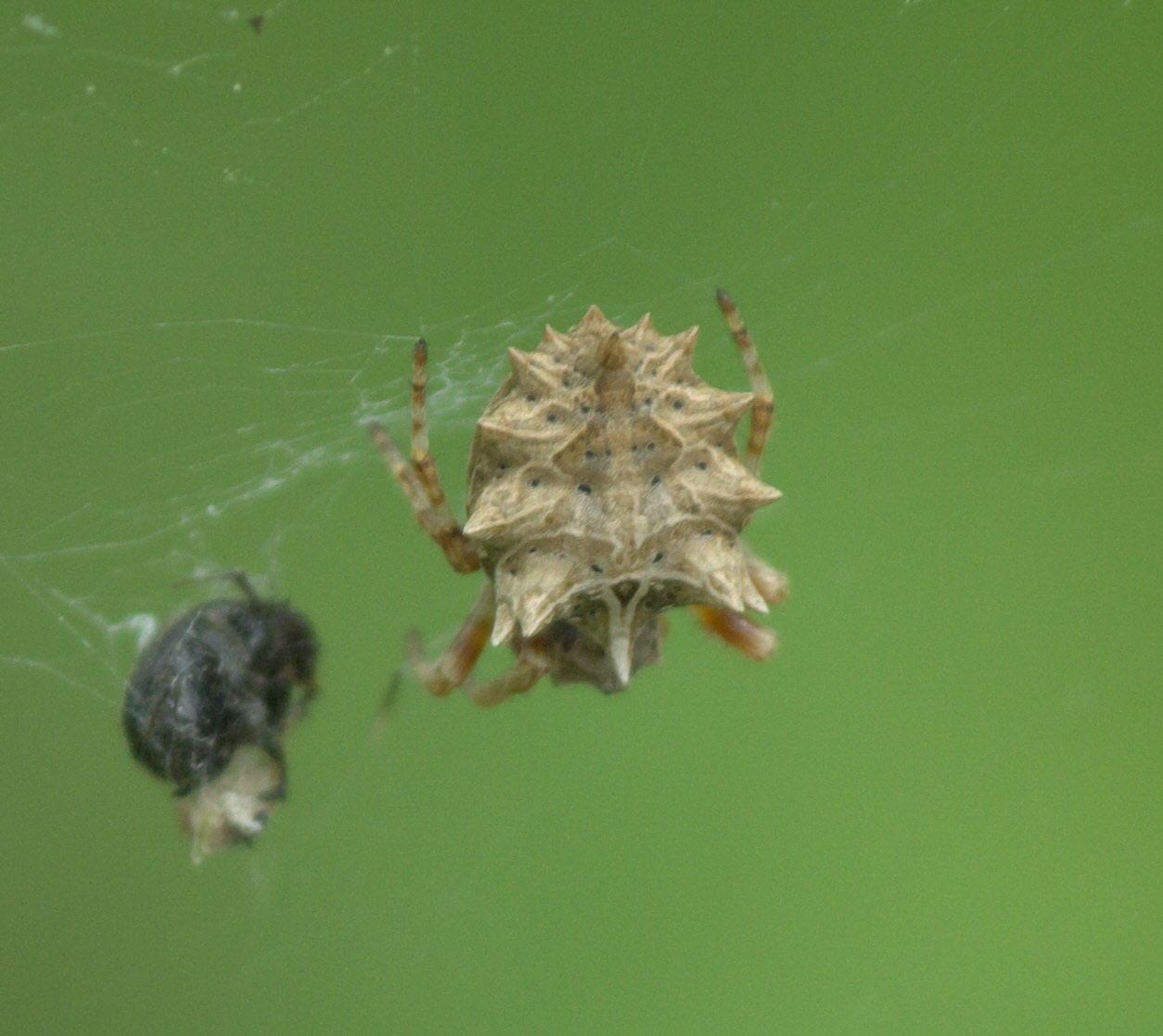
Starbellied orbweaver, Acanthepeira stellata
