= Cisseps wrightii =

Scientific classification
- Domain: Eukaryota
- Kingdom: Animalia
- Phylum: Arthropoda
- Class: Insecta
- Order: Lepidoptera
- Superfamily: Noctuoidea
- Family: Erebidae
- Subfamily: Arctiinae
- Genus: Cisseps
- Species: C. wrightii

Binomial name
- Cisseps wrightii (Stretch, 1885)

Synonyms
- Scepsis wrightii Stretch, 1885; Scepsis gravis H. Edwards, 1886

Species of moth

Cisseps wrightii is a moth of the subfamily Arctiinae. It was described by Stretch in 1885. It is found in California.
