= Aclytia ventralis =

Scientific classification
- Kingdom: Animalia
- Phylum: Arthropoda
- Clade: Pancrustacea
- Class: Insecta
- Order: Lepidoptera
- Superfamily: Noctuoidea
- Family: Erebidae
- Subfamily: Arctiinae
- Genus: Aclytia
- Species: A. ventralis

Binomial name
- Aclytia ventralis (Guérin-Méneville, 1843)

Synonyms
- Glaucopis ventralis Guérin-Méneville, [1844]; Aclytia conspicua Druce, 1884; Glaucopis lucania Schaus, 1889

Species of moth

Aclytia ventralis is a moth of the family Erebidae. It was described by Félix Édouard Guérin-Méneville in 1843. It is found in Mexico, Guatemala, Costa Rica and Panama.
