= Aclytia coeruleonitans =

Scientific classification
- Domain: Eukaryota
- Kingdom: Animalia
- Phylum: Arthropoda
- Class: Insecta
- Order: Lepidoptera
- Superfamily: Noctuoidea
- Family: Erebidae
- Subfamily: Arctiinae
- Genus: Aclytia
- Species: A. coeruleonitans

Binomial name
- Aclytia coeruleonitans Rothschild, 1912

Synonyms
- Aclytia coeruleonitens Rothschild, 1912

Species of moth

Aclytia coeruleonitans is a moth of the family Erebidae. It was described by Walter Rothschild in 1912. It is found in Bolivia.
