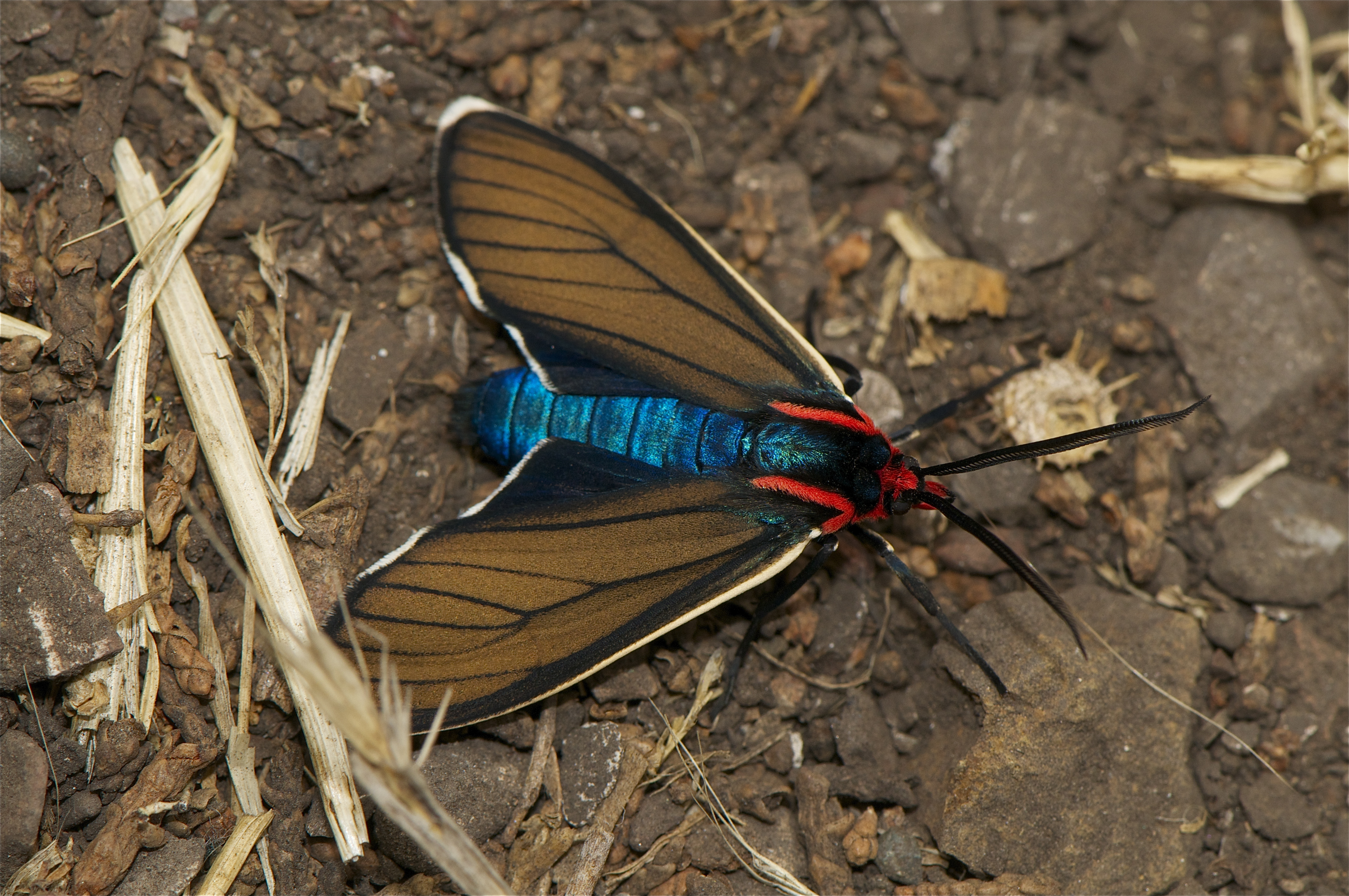
- Ctenucha brunnea

Scientific classification
- Kingdom: Animalia
- Phylum: Arthropoda
- Clade: Pancrustacea
- Class: Insecta
- Order: Lepidoptera
- Superfamily: Noctuoidea
- Family: Erebidae
- Subfamily: Arctiinae
- Tribe: Arctiini
- Subtribe: Ctenuchina; W. Kirby, 1837

= Ctenuchina =

Subtribe of moths

The Ctenuchina are a subtribe of moths in the family Erebidae. These moths are diurnal, meaning they fly during the day. Their coloration is similar to that of certain beetles and wasps that predators avoid.

== Taxonomy ==
The Ctenuchina were previously classified as the subfamily Ctenuchinae of the family Arctiidae. That subfamily contained three tribes: Ctenuchini, Euchromiini (wasp moths), and Syntomini. The family Arctiidae was lowered in rank to the subfamily Arctiinae, and consequently, the three tribes became subtribes (with the -ina suffix). Ctenuchina and Euchromiina were reclassified in the tribe Arctiini, while the Syntomina were raised in rank to the tribe Syntomini.

== Genera ==
List separated based on data from the Taxonomicon

- Cisseps
- Ctenucha
- Dahana

=== Assigned to subfamily Arctiinae. Not assigned to a tribe. ===
- Belemniastis
- Eunomia
- Isia

=== Assigned to tribe Arctiini. Not assigned to a subtribe. ===
- Belemnia
