= Aclytia heber =

Scientific classification
- Domain: Eukaryota
- Kingdom: Animalia
- Phylum: Arthropoda
- Class: Insecta
- Order: Lepidoptera
- Superfamily: Noctuoidea
- Family: Erebidae
- Subfamily: Arctiinae
- Genus: Aclytia
- Species: A. heber

Binomial name
- Aclytia heber (Cramer, 1780)

Synonyms
- Sphinx heber Cramer, [1780]; Sphinx halys Stoll, [1781]; Aclytia flaviventris Möschler, 1872

Species of moth

Aclytia heber is a moth of the family Erebidae. It was described by Pieter Cramer in 1780. It is found in Mexico, Guatemala, Costa Rica, Honduras, Cuba, Trinidad, Suriname and Brazil (Rio de Janeiro). A single specimen was collected at Alamo, Texas in November 2012.
