= Aclytia modesta =

Scientific classification
- Domain: Eukaryota
- Kingdom: Animalia
- Phylum: Arthropoda
- Class: Insecta
- Order: Lepidoptera
- Superfamily: Noctuoidea
- Family: Erebidae
- Subfamily: Arctiinae
- Genus: Aclytia
- Species: A. modesta

Binomial name
- Aclytia modesta Köhler, 1924

Species of moth

Aclytia modesta is a moth of the family Erebidae. It was described by Paul Köhler in 1924. It is found in Argentina.
