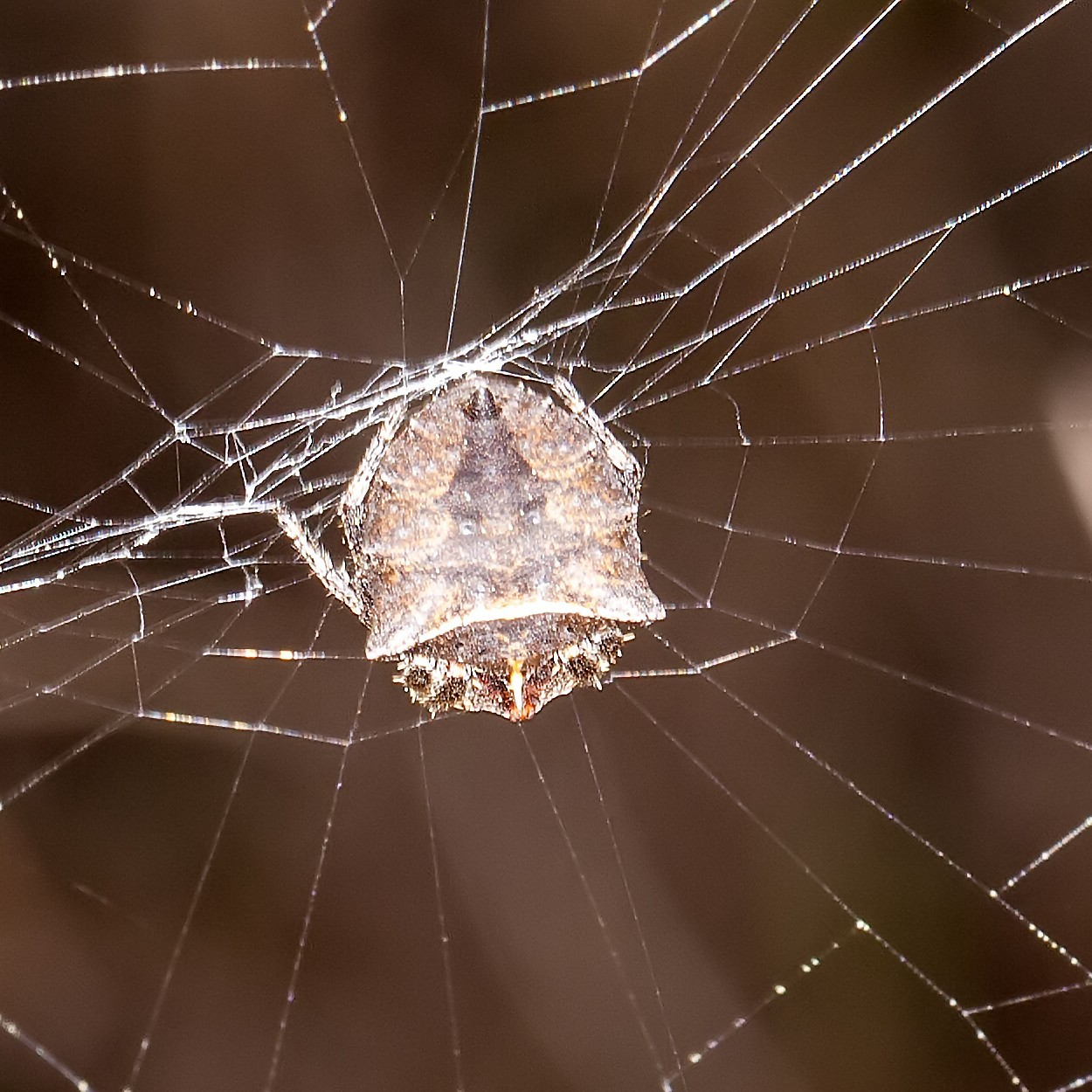

Scientific classification
- Domain: Eukaryota
- Kingdom: Animalia
- Phylum: Arthropoda
- Subphylum: Chelicerata
- Class: Arachnida
- Order: Araneae
- Infraorder: Araneomorphae
- Family: Araneidae
- Genus: Acanthepeira
- Species: A. cherokee

Binomial name
- Acanthepeira cherokee Levi, 1976

= Acanthepeira cherokee =

Species of spider

Acanthepeira cherokee is a species of orb weaver in the family Araneidae. It is found in the USA.
