= Aclytia petraea =

Scientific classification
- Domain: Eukaryota
- Kingdom: Animalia
- Phylum: Arthropoda
- Class: Insecta
- Order: Lepidoptera
- Superfamily: Noctuoidea
- Family: Erebidae
- Subfamily: Arctiinae
- Genus: Aclytia
- Species: A. petraea

Binomial name
- Aclytia petraea Schaus, 1892

Species of moth

Aclytia petraea is a moth of the family Erebidae. It was described by Schaus in 1892. It is found in Peru.
