= Antichloris caca =

Scientific classification
- Kingdom: Animalia
- Phylum: Arthropoda
- Class: Insecta
- Order: Lepidoptera
- Superfamily: Noctuoidea
- Family: Erebidae
- Subfamily: Arctiinae
- Genus: Antichloris
- Species: A. caca

Binomial name
- Antichloris caca Hübner, 1818

Synonyms
- Eriphia butleri Möschler, 1878

Species of moth

Antichloris caca is a moth of the family Erebidae. It was described by Jacob Hübner in 1818. It is found in Guatemala, Panama, Suriname and Brazil (Para, Rio de Janeiro).
