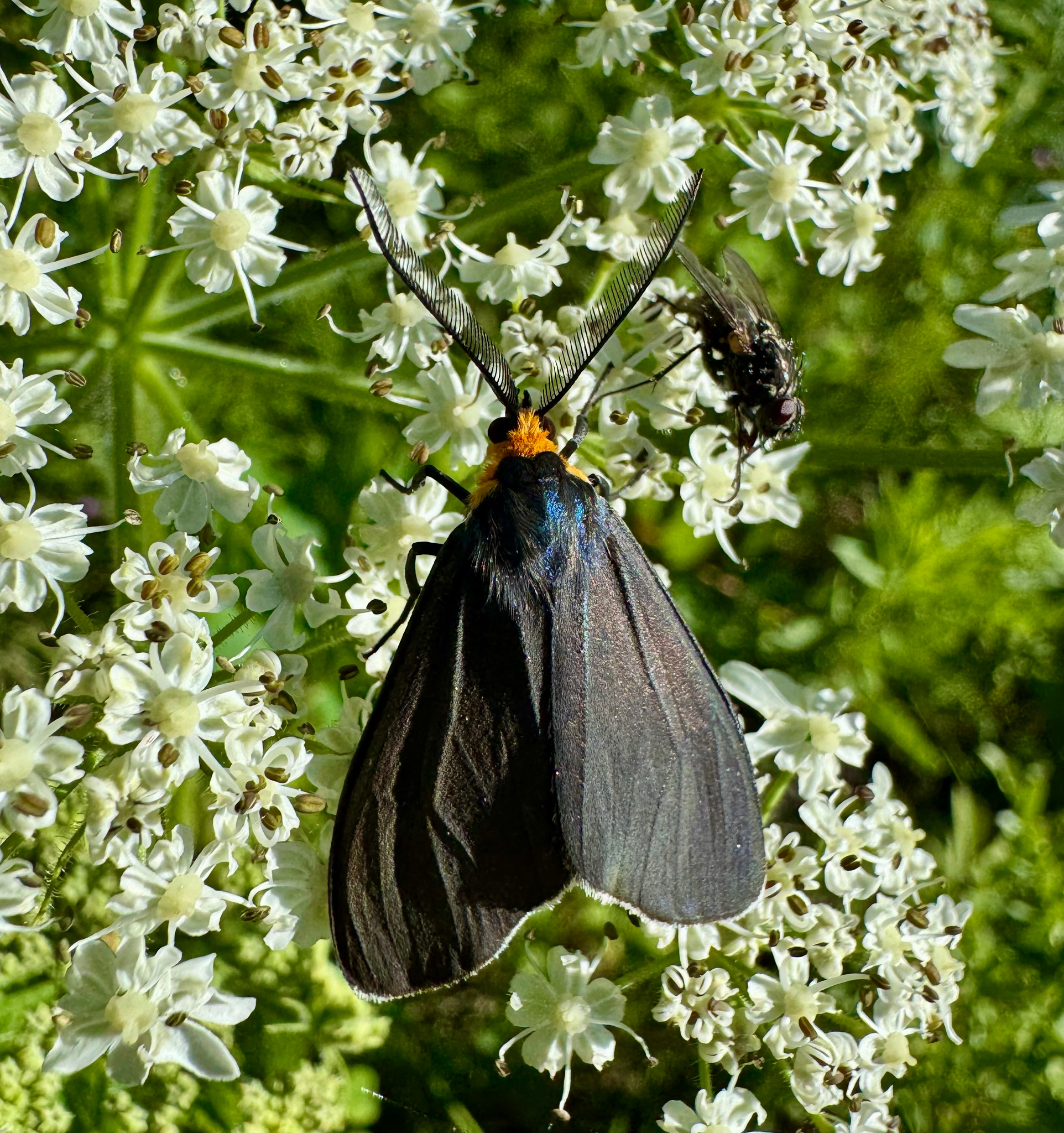
- Adult
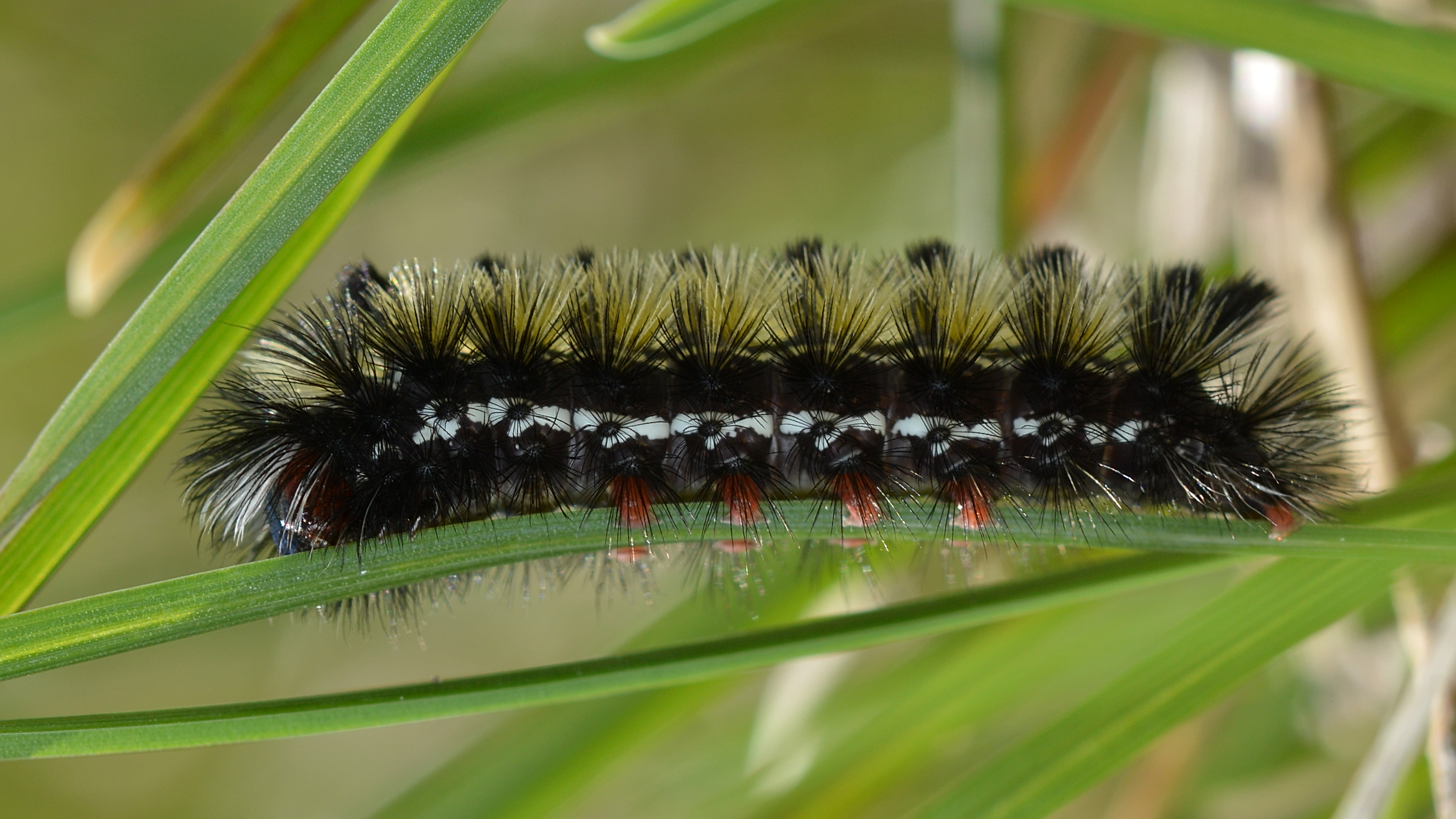
- Larva

Scientific classification
- Kingdom: Animalia
- Phylum: Arthropoda
- Class: Insecta
- Order: Lepidoptera
- Superfamily: Noctuoidea
- Family: Erebidae
- Subfamily: Arctiinae
- Genus: Ctenucha
- Species: C. virginica

Binomial name
- Ctenucha virginica Esper, 1794

Synonyms
- Sphinx virginica; Ctenucha latreillana

= Ctenucha virginica =

Virginia ctenucha

Species of moth

Ctenucha virginica, the Virginia ctenucha, is a moth of the family Erebidae. The species was first described by Eugenius Johann Christoph Esper in 1794.

== Morphology ==
The wingspan ranges from 40–50 millimetres (1.6–2.0 in). The wing color varies from black to olive brown. The body is a metallic blue green. The head is yellow orange, with feathery antennae. The caterpillar (about 20–25 mm) has multiple tufts of white and yellow hair. It undergoes metamorphosis in May–August.

== Range ==
It is endemic to eastern North America, from Newfoundland south to Virginia. According to the University of Alberta, there has been a westward expansion in the last 60 years as it has reached the Canadian Rockies and is now found in all Canadian provinces.

== Food plants ==
Larvae feed on a variety of host plants including various grasses, irises, and sedges. Adults drink nectar from flowers including goldenrod.

== Images ==
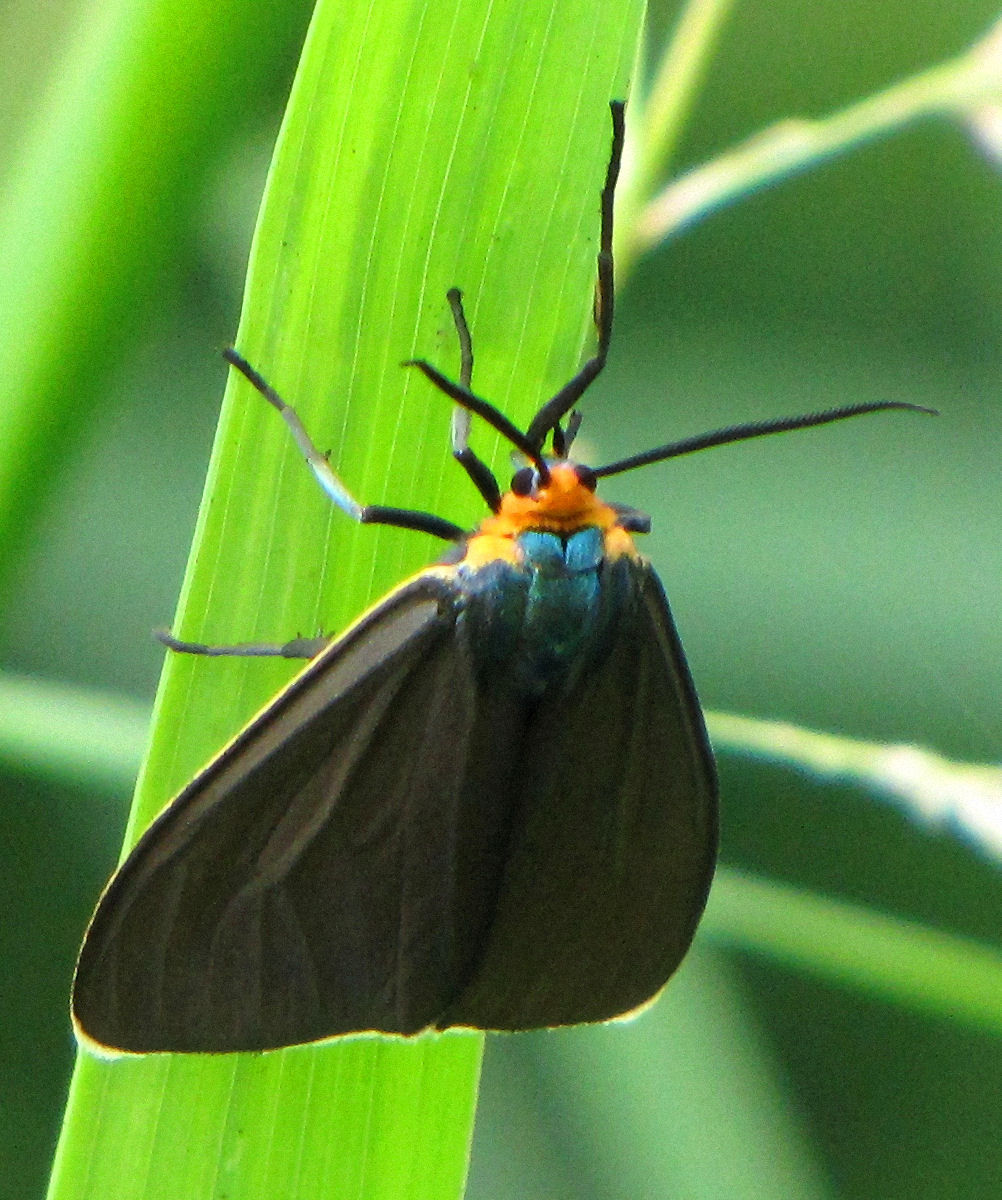
Adult, Ottawa, Ontario

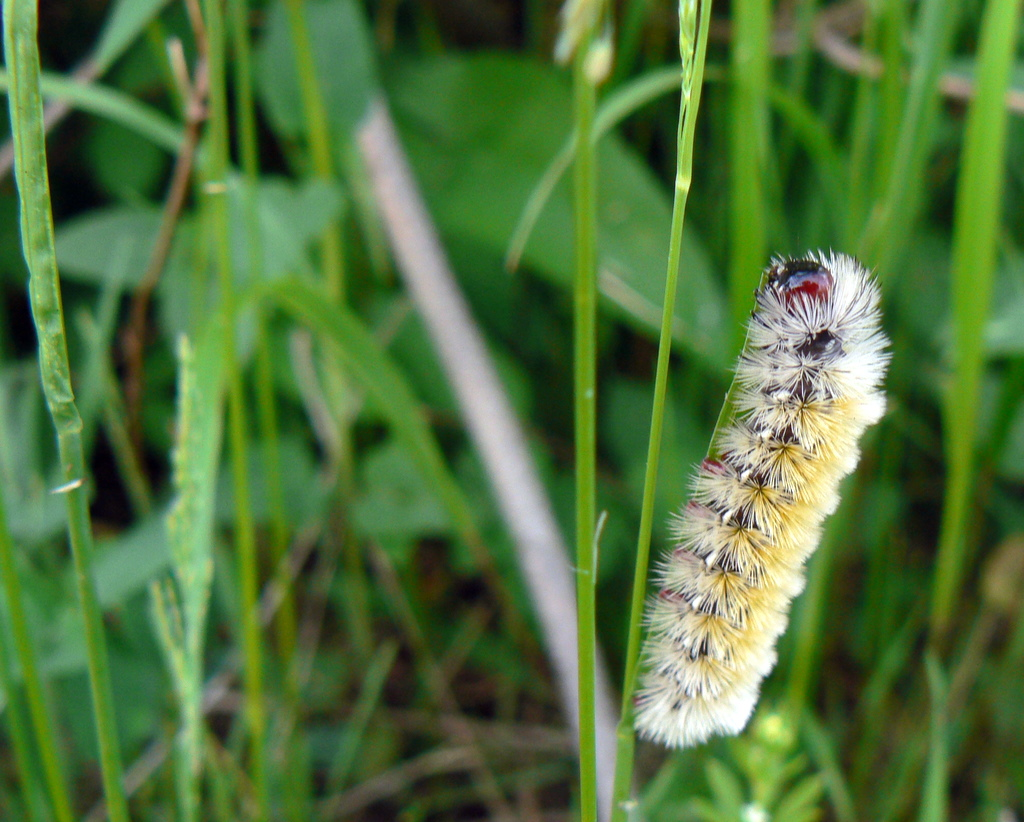
Caterpillar

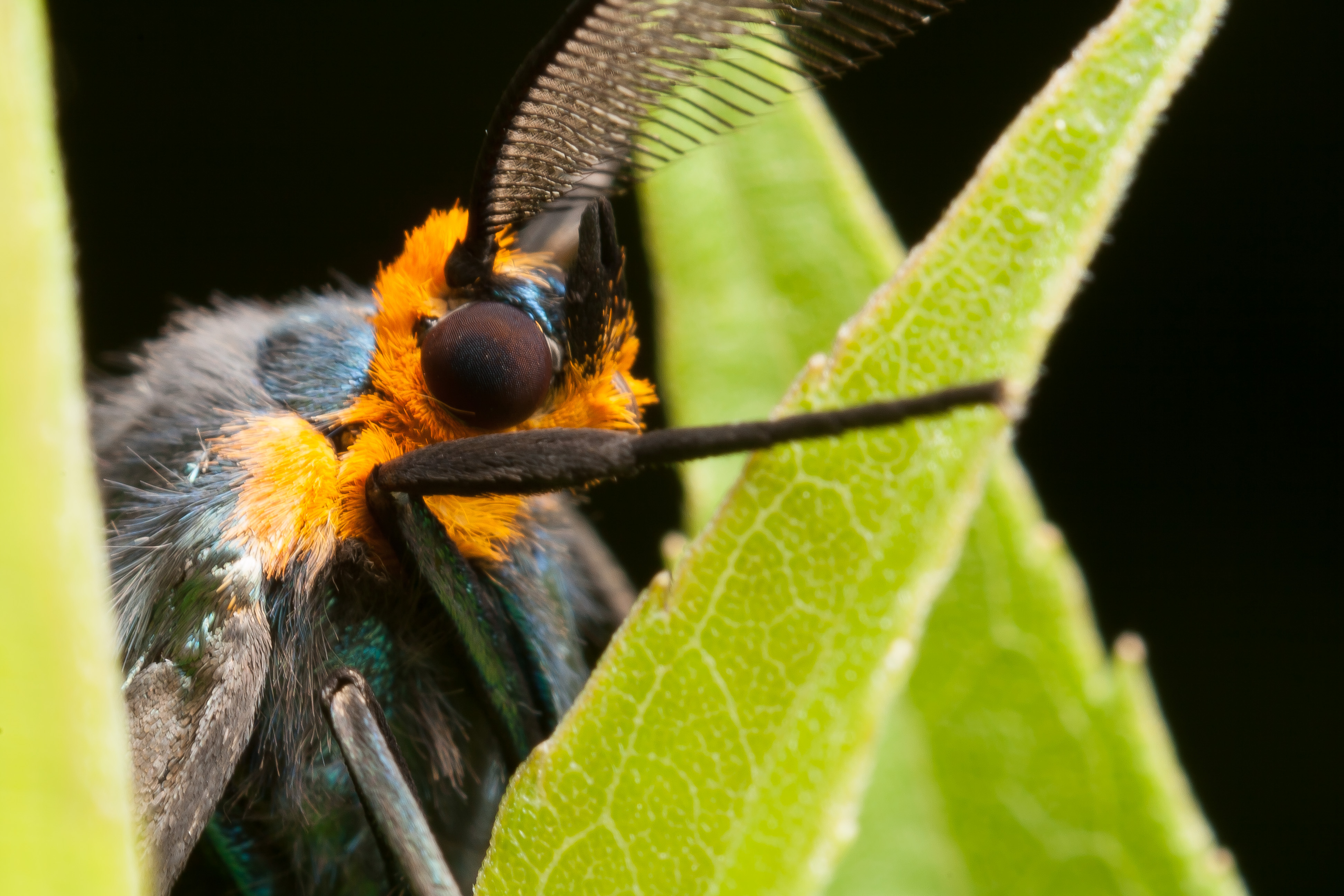
Detail

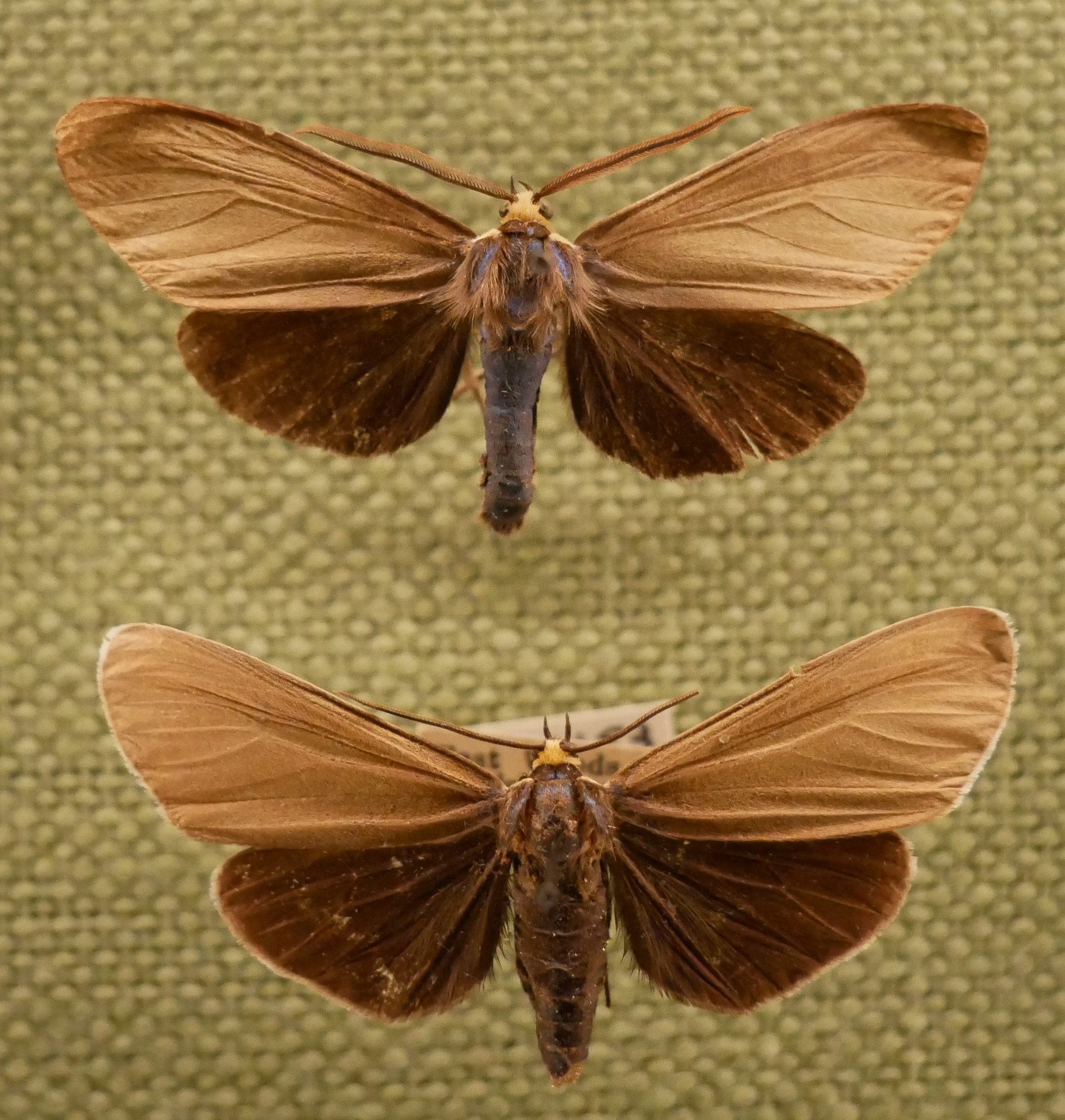
Museum specimens

== Similar species ==
- Cisseps fulvicollis – yellow-collared scape moth
- Harrisina americana – grapeleaf skeletonizer
