= Isia intricata =

Scientific classification
- Kingdom: Animalia
- Phylum: Arthropoda
- Clade: Pancrustacea
- Class: Insecta
- Order: Lepidoptera
- Superfamily: Noctuoidea
- Family: Erebidae
- Subfamily: Arctiinae
- Genus: Isia
- Species: I. intricata

Binomial name
- Isia intricata Walker, 1856

Synonyms
- Diacrisia intricata

Species of moth

Isia intricata is a moth of the subfamily Arctiinae. It was described by Francis Walker in 1856. It is found in southern Brazil.
