= Aclytia terra =

Scientific classification
- Domain: Eukaryota
- Kingdom: Animalia
- Phylum: Arthropoda
- Class: Insecta
- Order: Lepidoptera
- Superfamily: Noctuoidea
- Family: Erebidae
- Subfamily: Arctiinae
- Genus: Aclytia
- Species: A. terra

Binomial name
- Aclytia terra Schaus, 1896

Species of moth

Aclytia terra is a moth of the family Erebidae. It was described by William Schaus in 1896. It is found in São Paulo, Brazil.
