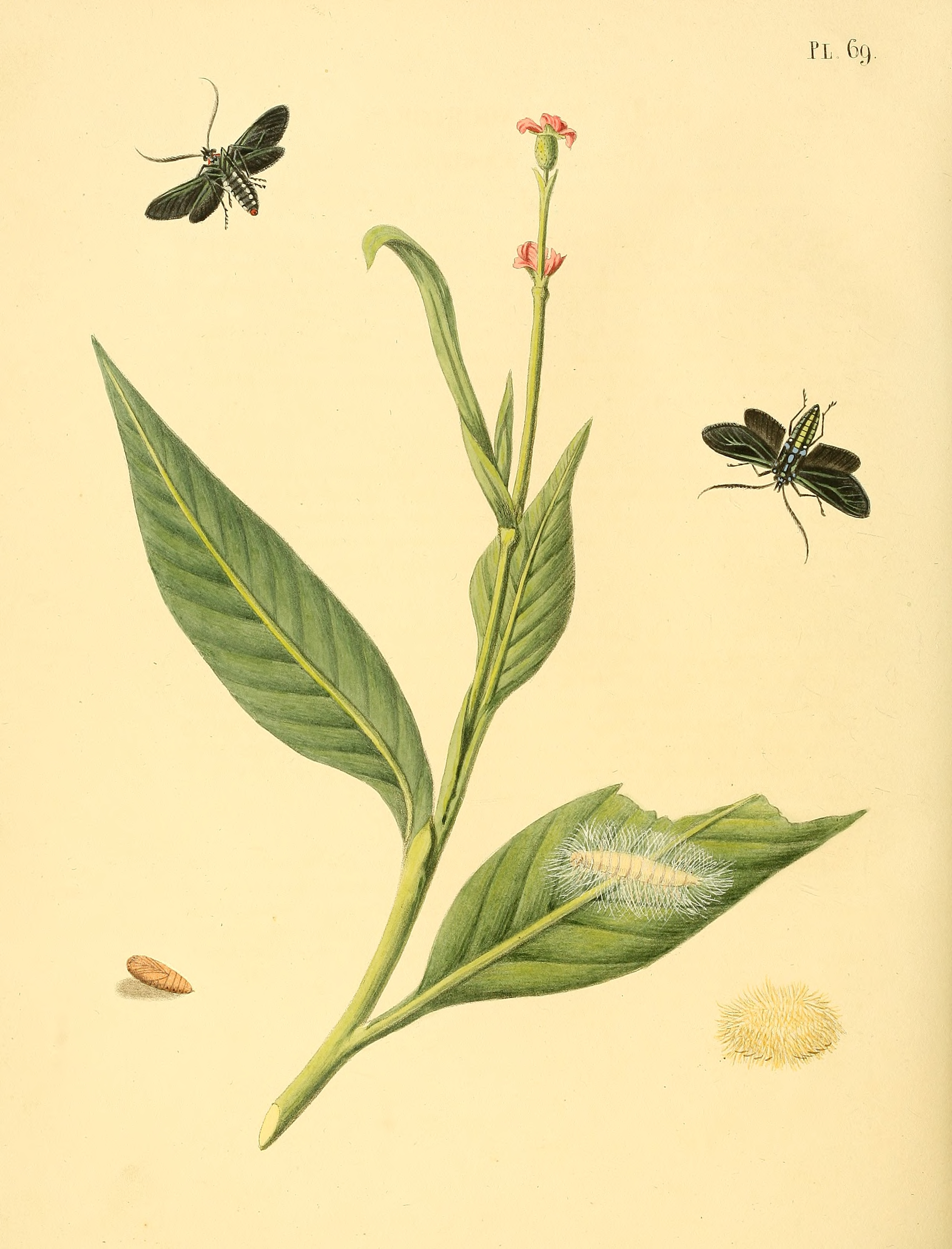

Scientific classification
- Domain: Eukaryota
- Kingdom: Animalia
- Phylum: Arthropoda
- Class: Insecta
- Order: Lepidoptera
- Superfamily: Noctuoidea
- Family: Erebidae
- Subfamily: Arctiinae
- Genus: Antichloris
- Species: A. eriphia

Binomial name
- Antichloris eriphia (Fabricius, 1777)

Synonyms
- Zygaena eriphia Fabricius, 1777; Sphinx alecton Stoll, [1782]; Antichloris phemonoe Hübner, 1818; Sesia melanochloros Sepp, [1845]; Copaena scapularis Herrich-Schäffer, [1855]; Chrysostola helus Herrich-Schäffer, [1855]

= Antichloris eriphia =

Species of moth

Antichloris eriphia is a moth of the family Erebidae. It was described by Johan Christian Fabricius in 1777. It is found in Trinidad, Suriname, Guyana and the Brazilian states of Pará and Rio de Janeiro. The moth has been recorded infrequently since 1985 in Great Britain, imported with bananas.
