= Belemniastis attidates =

Scientific classification
- Domain: Eukaryota
- Kingdom: Animalia
- Phylum: Arthropoda
- Class: Insecta
- Order: Lepidoptera
- Superfamily: Noctuoidea
- Family: Erebidae
- Subfamily: Arctiinae
- Genus: Belemniastis
- Species: B. attidates

Binomial name
- Belemniastis attidates (H. Druce, 1900)

Synonyms
- Belemnia attidates H. Druce, 1900

Species of moth

Belemniastis attidates is a moth of the subfamily Arctiinae. It was described by Herbert Druce in 1900. It is found in Colombia.
