= Aclytia reducta =

Scientific classification
- Domain: Eukaryota
- Kingdom: Animalia
- Phylum: Arthropoda
- Class: Insecta
- Order: Lepidoptera
- Superfamily: Noctuoidea
- Family: Erebidae
- Subfamily: Arctiinae
- Genus: Aclytia
- Species: A. reducta

Binomial name
- Aclytia reducta Rothschild, 1912

Synonyms
- Aclytia deleta Zerny, 1931

Species of moth

Aclytia reducta is a moth of the family Erebidae. It was described by Walter Rothschild in 1912. It is found in Brazil, Venezuela and Peru.
