= Aclytia apicalis =

Scientific classification
- Kingdom: Animalia
- Phylum: Arthropoda
- Class: Insecta
- Order: Lepidoptera
- Superfamily: Noctuoidea
- Family: Erebidae
- Subfamily: Arctiinae
- Genus: Aclytia
- Species: A. apicalis

Binomial name
- Aclytia apicalis (Walker, 1854)

Synonyms
- Euchromis apicalis Walker, 1854

Species of moth

Aclytia apicalis is a moth of the family Erebidae. It was described by Francis Walker in 1854. It is found in the Brazilian states of Amazonas and Pará.
