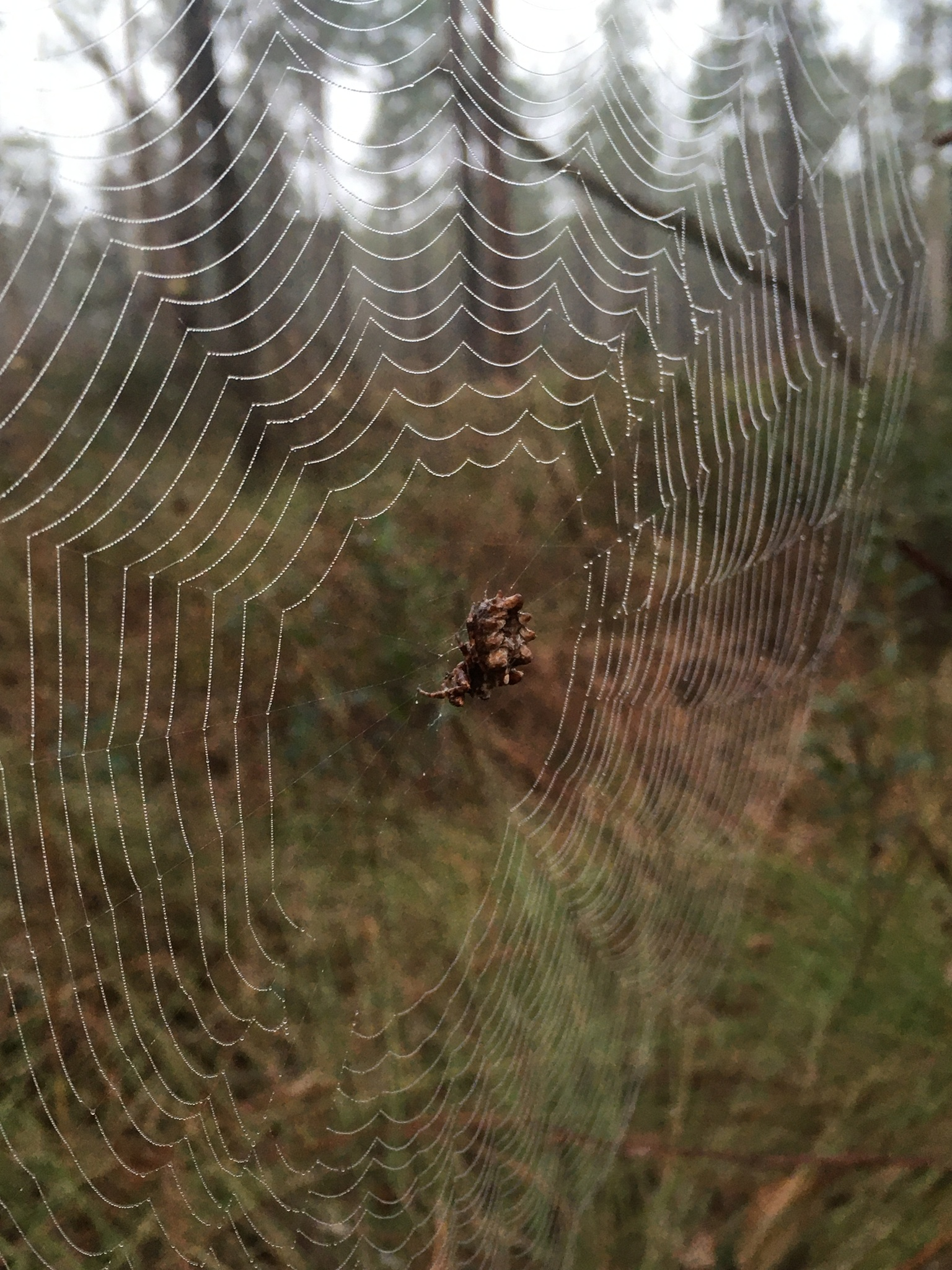
- Acanthepeira marion on its web

Scientific classification
- Kingdom: Animalia
- Phylum: Arthropoda
- Subphylum: Chelicerata
- Class: Arachnida
- Order: Araneae
- Infraorder: Araneomorphae
- Family: Araneidae
- Genus: Acanthepeira
- Species: A. marion

Binomial name
- Acanthepeira marion Levi, 1976

= Acanthepeira marion =

Species of spider

Acanthepeira marion is a species of orb weaver in the spider family Araneidae. It is found in the United States and Mexico.
