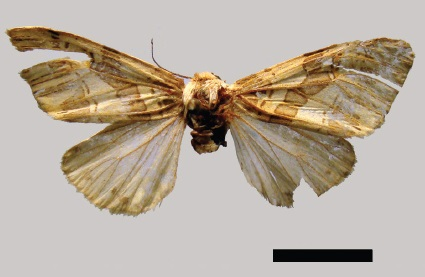

Scientific classification
- Kingdom: Animalia
- Phylum: Arthropoda
- Clade: Pancrustacea
- Class: Insecta
- Order: Lepidoptera
- Superfamily: Noctuoidea
- Family: Erebidae
- Subfamily: Arctiinae
- Genus: Isia
- Species: I. alcumena

Binomial name
- Isia alcumena (Berg, 1882)

Synonyms
- Spilosoma alcumena Berg, 1882; Diacrisia alcumena steinbachi Rothschild, 1910; Diacrisia alcumena kennedyi Rothschild, 1910; Diacrisia alcumena flavitincta Rothschild, 1910

= Isia alcumena =

Species of moth

Isia alcumena is a moth of the subfamily Arctiinae. It was described by Carlos Berg in 1882 and is found in Argentina, Venezuela, Brazil and Bolivia.

== Subspecies ==
- Isia alcumena alcumena (Argentina)
- Isia alcumena flavitincta (Rothschild, 1910) (Venezuela)
- Isia alcumena kennedyi (Rothschild, 1910) (Brazil: Minas Geraes)
- Isia alcumena steinbachi (Rothschild, 1910) (Bolivia)
