= Aclytia leucaspila =

Scientific classification
- Domain: Eukaryota
- Kingdom: Animalia
- Phylum: Arthropoda
- Class: Insecta
- Order: Lepidoptera
- Superfamily: Noctuoidea
- Family: Erebidae
- Subfamily: Arctiinae
- Genus: Aclytia
- Species: A. leucaspila

Binomial name
- Aclytia leucaspila Fleming, 1959

Species of moth

Aclytia leucaspila is a moth of the family Erebidae. It was described by Henry Fleming in 1959. It is found in Trinidad.
