= Aclytia superbior =

Scientific classification
- Domain: Eukaryota
- Kingdom: Animalia
- Phylum: Arthropoda
- Class: Insecta
- Order: Lepidoptera
- Superfamily: Noctuoidea
- Family: Erebidae
- Subfamily: Arctiinae
- Genus: Aclytia
- Species: A. superbior

Binomial name
- Aclytia superbior Strand

Species of moth

Aclytia superbior is a moth of the family Erebidae. It was described by Strand.
