= Aclytia mariamne =

Scientific classification
- Domain: Eukaryota
- Kingdom: Animalia
- Phylum: Arthropoda
- Class: Insecta
- Order: Lepidoptera
- Superfamily: Noctuoidea
- Family: Erebidae
- Subfamily: Arctiinae
- Genus: Aclytia
- Species: A. mariamne

Binomial name
- Aclytia mariamne (H. Druce, 1855)

Synonyms
- Charidea mariamne H. Druce, 1885

Species of moth

Aclytia mariamne is a moth of the family Erebidae. It was described by Herbert Druce in 1855. It is found in Colombia.
