= Antichloris clementi =

Scientific classification
- Kingdom: Animalia
- Phylum: Arthropoda
- Class: Insecta
- Order: Lepidoptera
- Superfamily: Noctuoidea
- Family: Erebidae
- Subfamily: Arctiinae
- Genus: Antichloris
- Species: A. clementi

Binomial name
- Antichloris clementi Schaus, 1938

Species of moth

Antichloris clementi is a moth of the family Erebidae. It was described by Schaus in 1938. It is found in Cuba.
