= Belemniastis =

Scientific classification
- Kingdom: Animalia
- Phylum: Arthropoda
- Class: Insecta
- Order: Lepidoptera
- Superfamily: Noctuoidea
- Family: Erebidae
- Subfamily: Arctiinae
- Genus: Belemniastis; Hampson, 1901

Genus of moths

Belemniastis is a genus of moths in the subfamily Arctiinae. The genus was erected by George Hampson in 1901.

== Species ==
- Belemniastis attidates Druce, 1900
- Belemniastis troetschi Druce, 1896
- Belemniastis whiteleyi Druce, 1888
