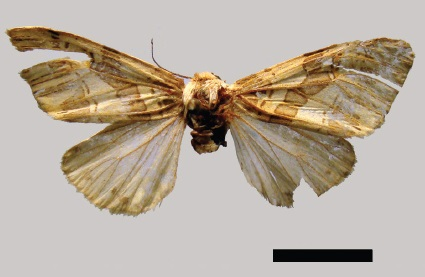
- Isia alcumena

Scientific classification
- Kingdom: Animalia
- Phylum: Arthropoda
- Clade: Pancrustacea
- Class: Insecta
- Order: Lepidoptera
- Superfamily: Noctuoidea
- Family: Erebidae
- Subfamily: Arctiinae
- Genus: Isia; Walker, 1856

= Isia (moth) =

Genus of moths

Isia is a genus of moths in the subfamily Arctiinae. It was established by Francis Walker in 1856.

== Species ==
- Isia alcumena Berg, 1882
- Isia cornuta Travassos, 1947
- Isia intricata Walker, 1856
