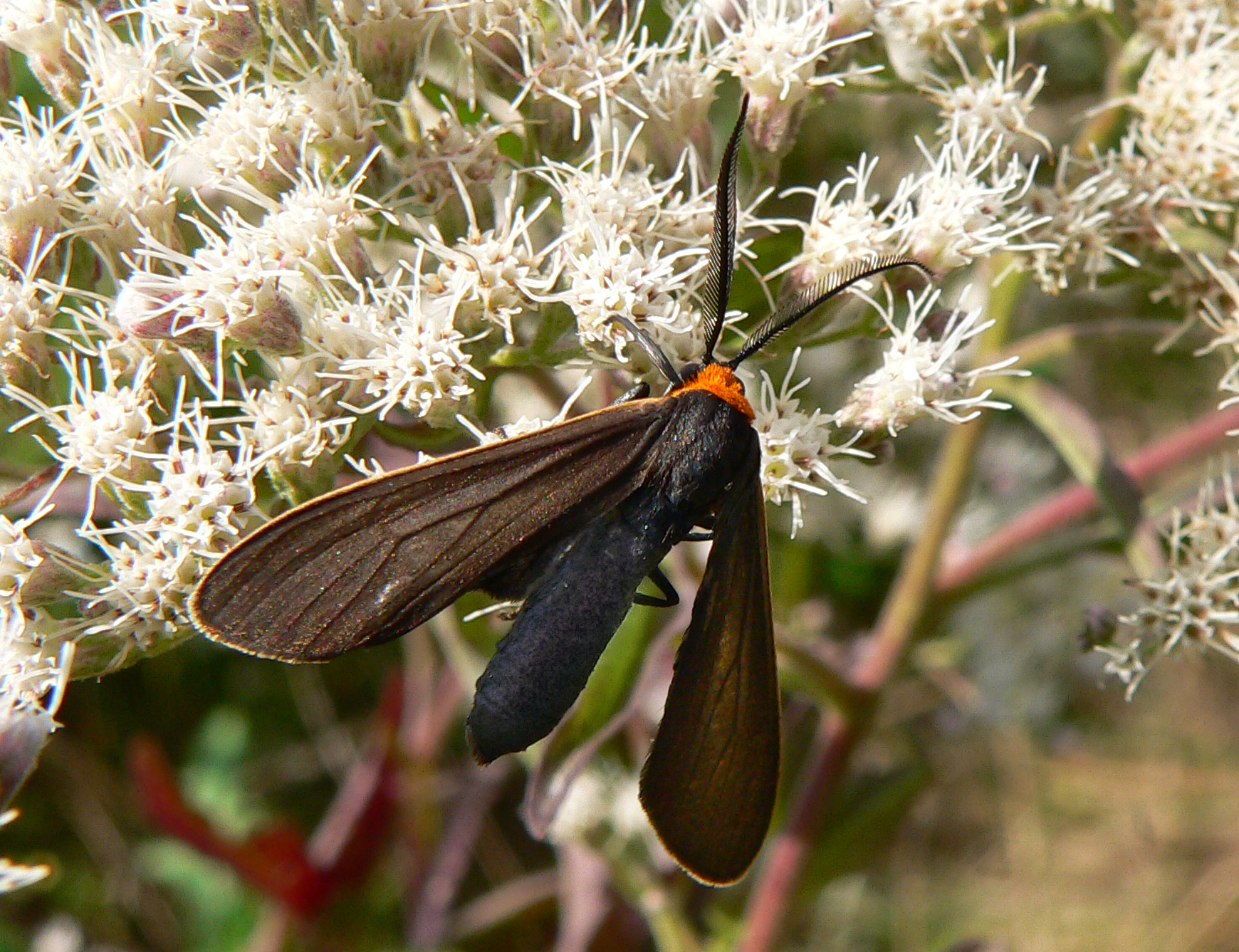

Scientific classification
- Domain: Eukaryota
- Kingdom: Animalia
- Phylum: Arthropoda
- Class: Insecta
- Order: Lepidoptera
- Superfamily: Noctuoidea
- Family: Erebidae
- Subfamily: Arctiinae
- Genus: Cisseps
- Species: C. fulvicollis

Binomial name
- Cisseps fulvicollis (Hübner, 1818)

Synonyms
- Glaucopis fulvicollis Hübner, [1818]; Glaucopis semidiaphana Harris, 1839; Scepsis pallens H. Edwards, 1886

= Cisseps fulvicollis =

Yellow-collared scape moth

Species of moth

Cisseps fulvicollis, the yellow-collared scape moth, is a species of the family Erebidae and subfamily Arctiinae. It was described by Jacob Hübner in 1818.

== Description ==
The wingspan is between 1 and 1 1/2 inches (25 and 38 mm).

== Distribution ==
This moth is active during late spring and summer in fields and forest edges throughout Canada south to Texas and Florida.

== Life cycle ==
The caterpillar is yellow, brown or black with sparse long, soft, pale setae. It has dark stripes on its back and sides surrounded by yellow or orange stripes.

=== Larval foods ===
- Grasses
- Sedges

=== Range ===
It is widespread in North America, including the southeastern US, where the Virginia ctenucha (Ctenucha virginica) is absent.

== Subspecies ==
- Cisseps fulvicollis fulvicollis
- Cisseps fulvicollis pallens (H. Edwards, 1886)

== Similar species ==
- Ctenucha virginica – Virginia ctenucha

== Images ==
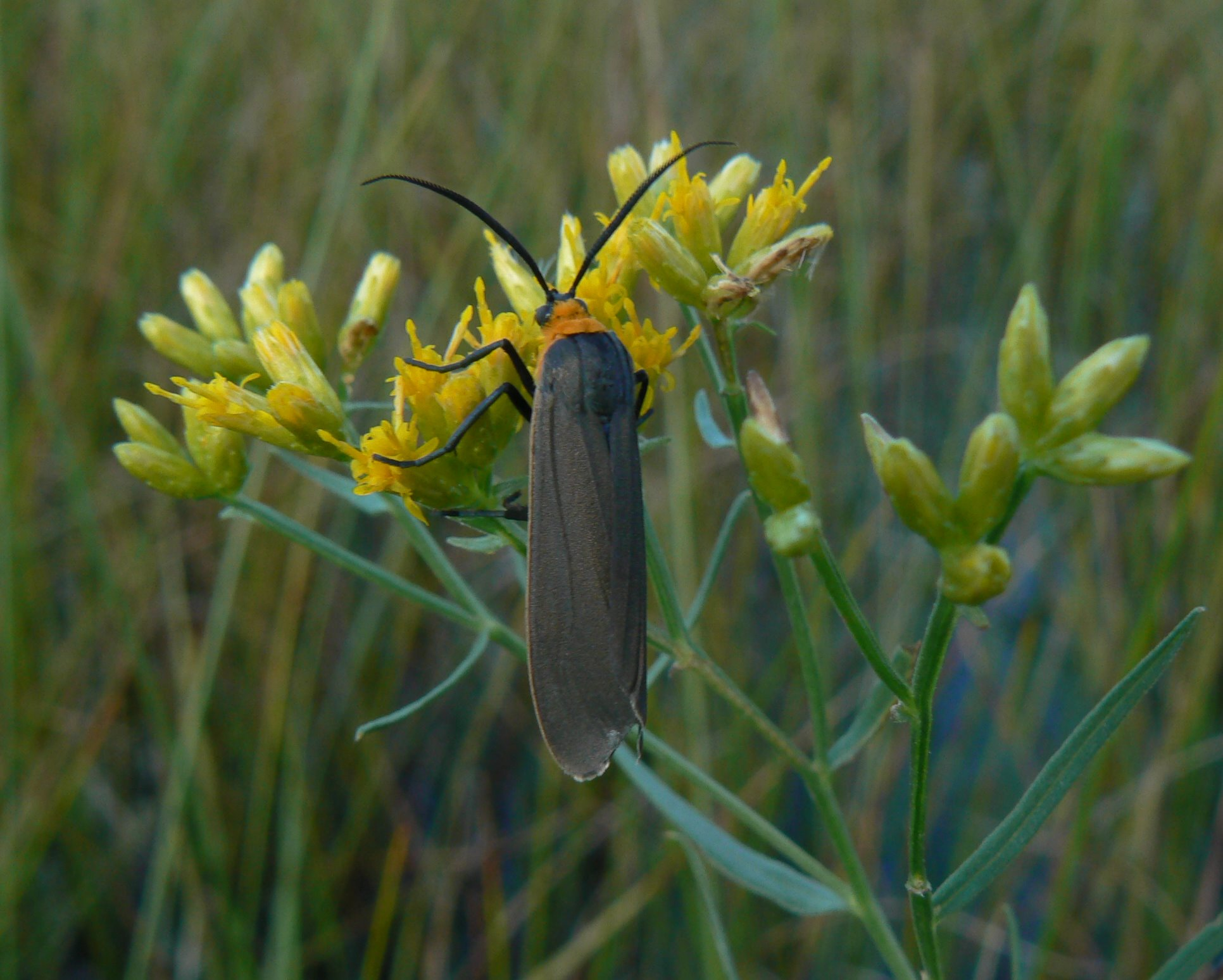
Yellow-collared scape moth

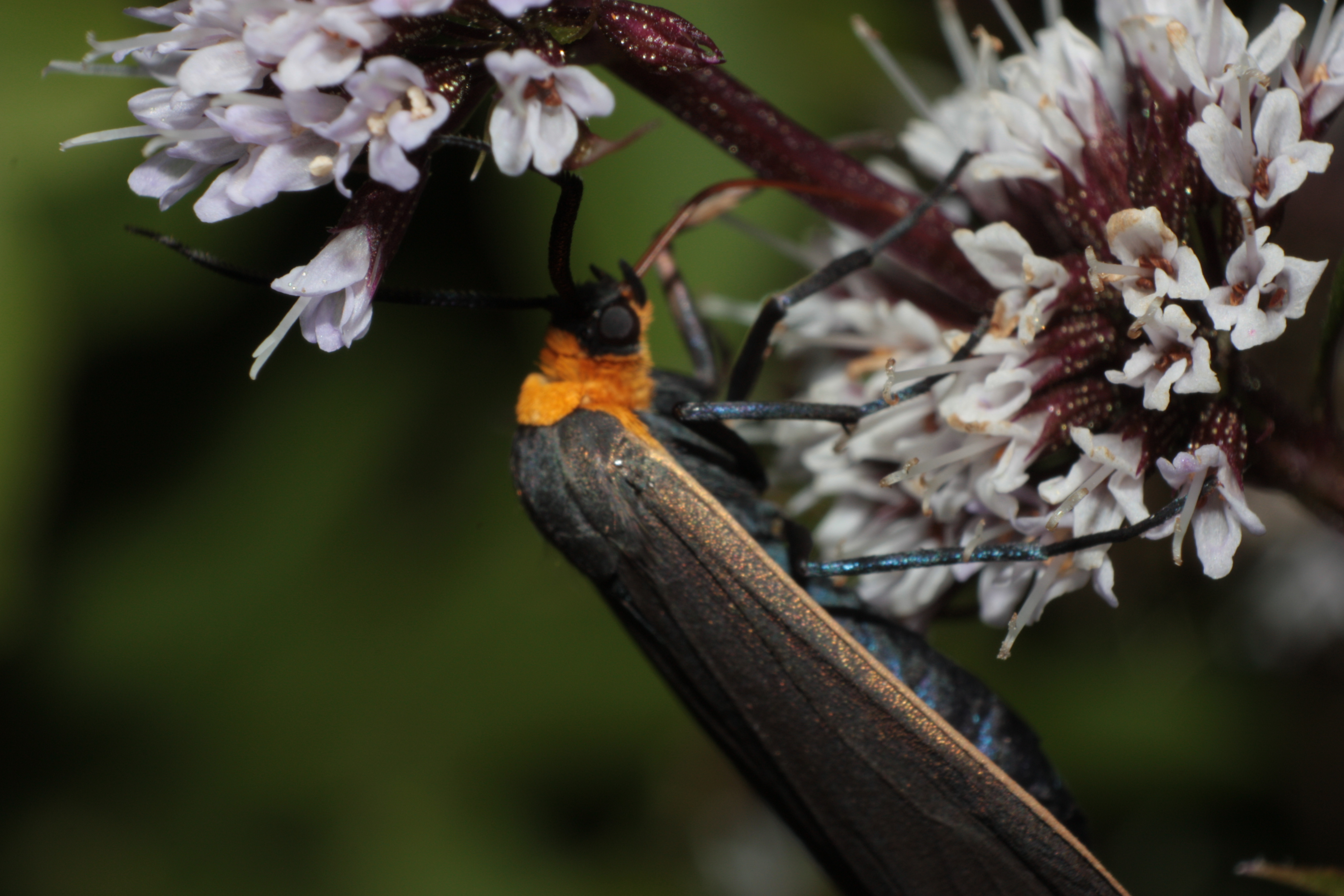
With visible proboscis

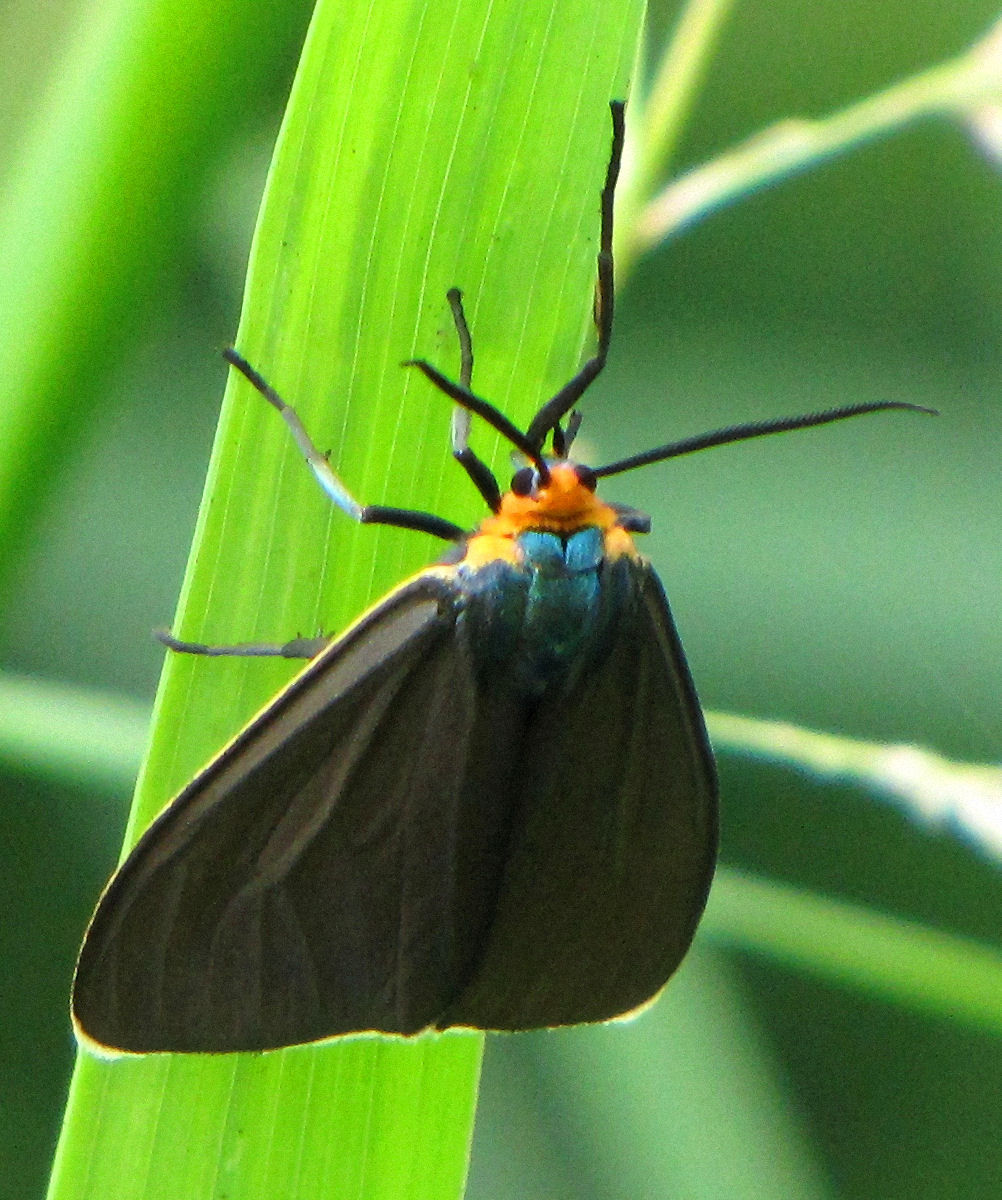
For comparison Virginia ctenucha (Ctenucha virginica)

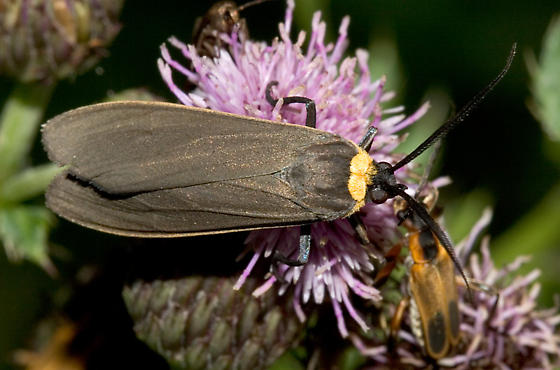
With folded wings

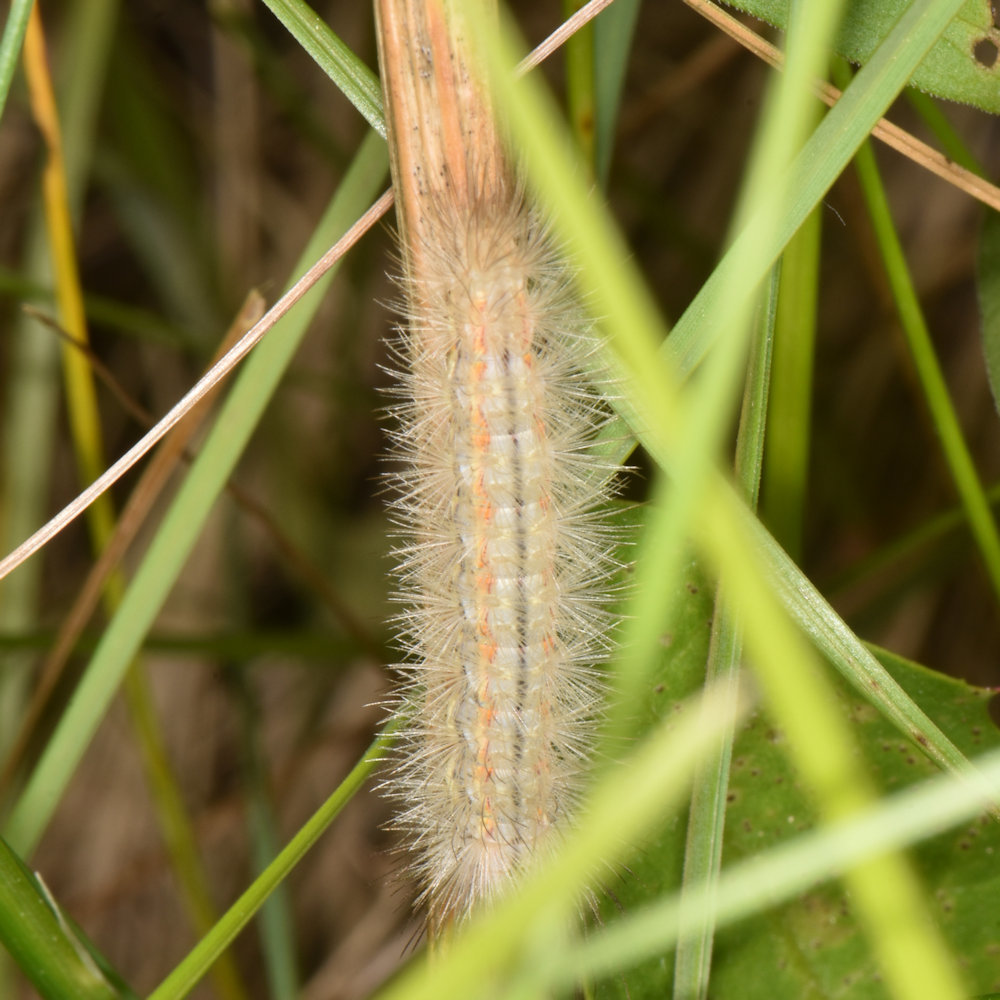
Caterpillar
