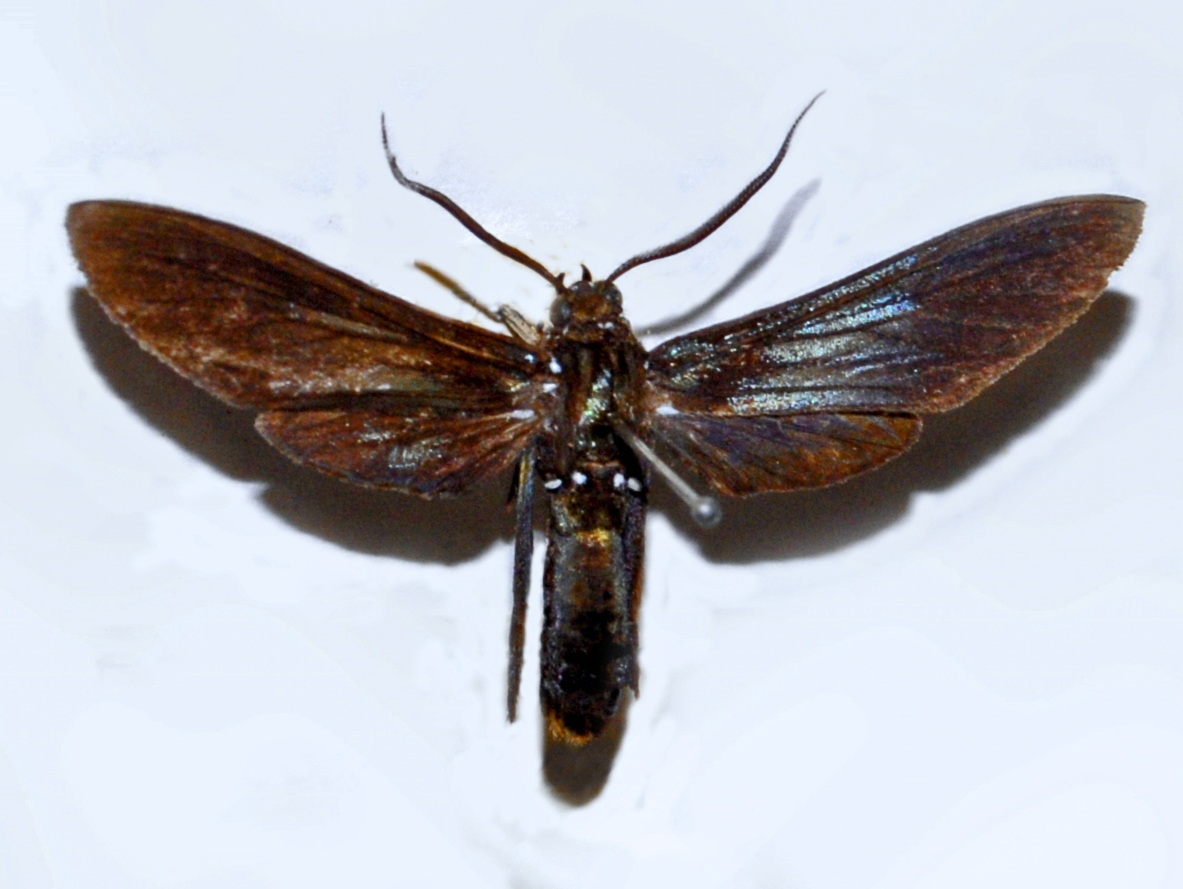
- Macrocneme lades

Scientific classification
- Kingdom: Animalia
- Phylum: Arthropoda
- Clade: Pancrustacea
- Class: Insecta
- Order: Lepidoptera
- Superfamily: Noctuoidea
- Family: Erebidae
- Subfamily: Arctiinae
- Subtribe: Euchromiina
- Genus: Macrocneme; Hübner, 1818

= Macrocneme =

Genus of moths

Macrocneme is a genus of tiger moths in the family Erebidae. The genus was erected by Jacob Hübner in 1818.

== Species ==
- Macrocneme adonis Druce, 1884
- Macrocneme albiventer Dognin, 1923
- Macrocneme aurifera Hampson, 1914
- Macrocneme chrysitis (Guérin-Méneville, [1844])
- Macrocneme cinyras Schaus, 1889
- Macrocneme coerulescens Dognin, 1906
- Macrocneme cupreipennis Walker, 1856
- Macrocneme cyanea (Butler, 1876)
- Macrocneme euphrasia Schaus, 1924
- Macrocneme guyanensis Dognin, 1911
- Macrocneme immanis Hampson, 1898
- Macrocneme lades (Cramer, [1775])
- Macrocneme leucostigma (Perty, 1834)
- Macrocneme maja (Fabricius, 1787)
- Macrocneme mormo Dietz, 1994
- Macrocneme semiviridis Druce, 1911
- Macrocneme spinivalva Fleming, 1957
- Macrocneme thyra Möschler, 1883
- Macrocneme thyridia Hampson, 1898
- Macrocneme verdivittata (Klages, 1906)
- Macrocneme vidua (Bryk, 1953)
- Macrocneme viridis (Druce, 1883)
- Macrocneme yepezi Forster, 1949

== Former species ==
- Macrocneme albitarsia Hampson, 1898
- Macrocneme alesa Druce, 1890
- Macrocneme auripes (Walker, 1854)
- Macrocneme chrysotarsia Hampson, 1898
- Macrocneme eacus (Stoll, [1781])
- Macrocneme esmeralda Butler, 1876
- Macrocneme evelina Druce, 1884
- Macrocneme hesione Druce, 1888
- Macrocneme indistincta Butler, 1876
- Macrocneme jalapensis (Schaus, 1889)
- Macrocneme laciades (Schaus, 1889)
- Macrocneme laconia (Druce, 1884)
- Macrocneme misitra (Schaus, 1889)
- Macrocneme naja (Burmeister, 1878)
- Macrocneme nigritarsia Hampson, 1898
- Macrocneme vittata (Walker, 1854)
