= Romanes (surname) =

Romanes is a surname. Notable people with this surname include:

- Ethel Romanes (1856–1927), British writer and religious activist
- George Romanes (1848–1894), Canadian-Scots biologist and physiologist
- George John Romanes (anatomist) (1916–2014), Scottish anatomist and professor of anatomy
- Glenyys Romanes (born 1945), Australian politician
- Kenneth Romanes (1866–1951), English translator, writer, and activist
- Muriel Romanes (born 1946), British TV actress and stage director

== See also ==
- Romanes & Paterson, a shop in Edinburgh, Scotland
- Romanes Lecture, an annual lecture in Oxford, England
- Los Romanes, a hamlet in Andalusia, Spain
- Roman (surname), includes the Romans surname
- Romani language, also known as Romanes
