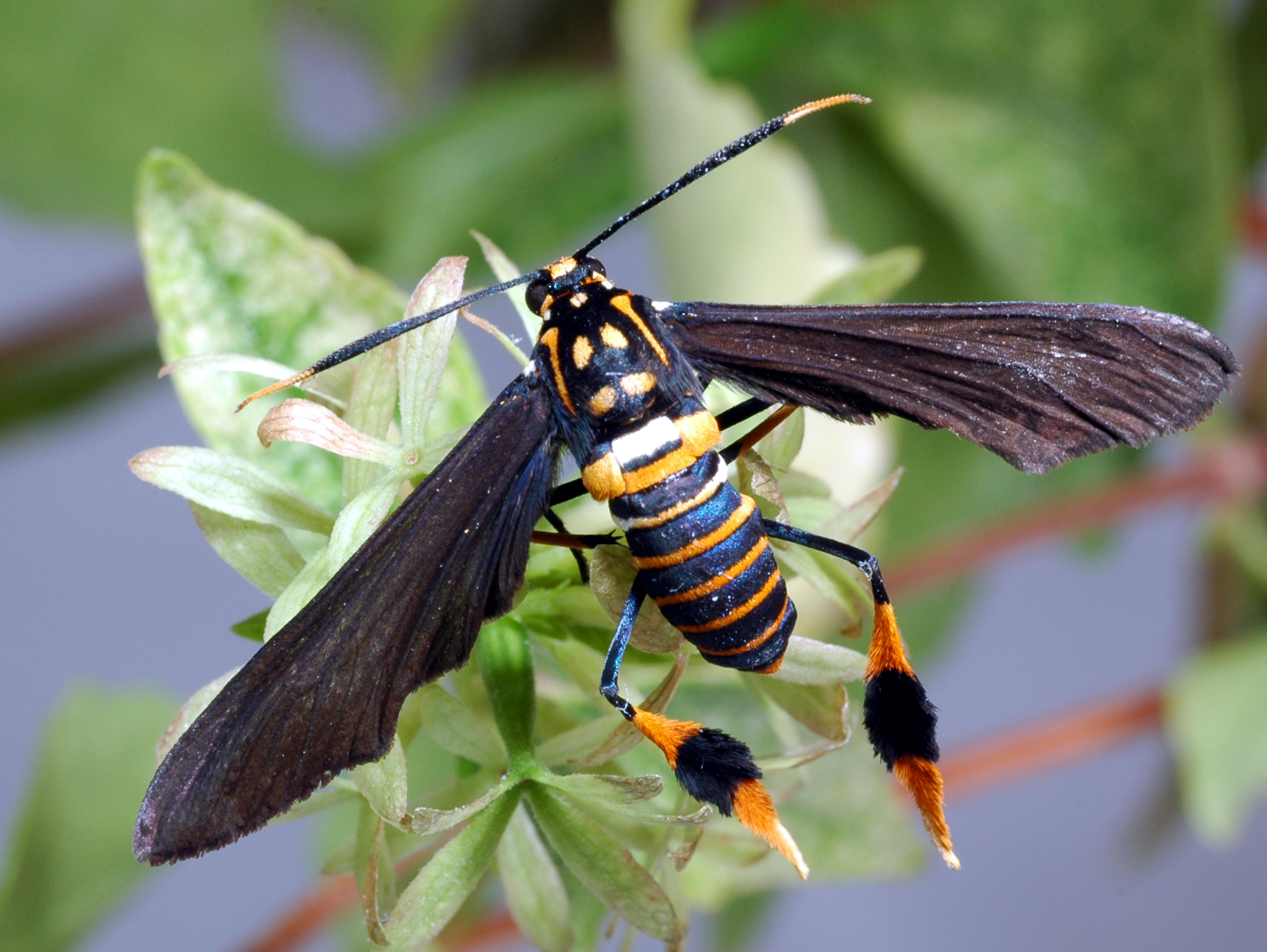
- Horama panthalon

Scientific classification
- Kingdom: Animalia
- Phylum: Arthropoda
- Clade: Pancrustacea
- Class: Insecta
- Order: Lepidoptera
- Superfamily: Noctuoidea
- Family: Erebidae
- Subfamily: Arctiinae
- Subtribe: Euchromiina
- Genus: Horama; Hübner, [1819]

Synonyms
- Mastigocera Harris, 1839; Phylloecia Guérin-Méneville, [1844]; Callicarus Grote, 1866; Drucea Kirby, 1892

= Horama =

Genus of moths

Horama is a genus of tiger moths in the family Erebidae first described by Jacob Hübner in 1819.

== Species ==
- Horama diffissa Grote, 1866
- Horama grotei Butler, 1876
- Horama margarita McCabe, 1992
- Horama oedippus (Boisduval, 1870)
- Horama panthalon (Fabricius, 1793) – Texas wasp moth
- Horama pennipes (Grote, 1866)
- Horama plumipes (Drury, 1773)
- Horama pretus (Cramer, [1777])
- Horama rawlinsi McCabe, 1992
- Horama tarsalis Walker, 1856
- Horama zapata Dietz & Duckworth, 1976

=== Former species ===
- Horama clavipes (Boisduval, 1870)
