= Horama diffissa =

Scientific classification
- Domain: Eukaryota
- Kingdom: Animalia
- Phylum: Arthropoda
- Class: Insecta
- Order: Lepidoptera
- Superfamily: Noctuoidea
- Family: Erebidae
- Subfamily: Arctiinae
- Genus: Horama
- Species: H. diffissa

Binomial name
- Horama diffissa Grote, 1866

Synonyms
- Horamia pretellus Herrich-Schäffer, 1866

Species of moth

Horama diffissa is a moth in the family Erebidae first described by Augustus Radcliffe Grote in 1866. It is found in Cuba and Haiti.

The wingspan is about 33 mm for males and 38–44 mm for females.
