= Horama pennipes =

Scientific classification
- Kingdom: Animalia
- Phylum: Arthropoda
- Class: Insecta
- Order: Lepidoptera
- Superfamily: Noctuoidea
- Family: Erebidae
- Subfamily: Arctiinae
- Genus: Horama
- Species: H. pennipes

Binomial name
- Horama pennipes (Grote, 1866)

Synonyms
- Callicarus pennipes Grote, 1866; Horamia plumosa Herrich-Schäffer, 1866

Species of moth

Horama pennipes is a moth in the subfamily Arctiinae first described by Augustus Radcliffe Grote in 1866. It is found on Cuba.

The wingspan is about 26 mm. The forewings are fuscous black with a streak through the middle of the cell. The hindwings are fuscous black with a faint streak below the cell. The costal margin is gray.
