= Roman (surname) =

Roman, Román, or Romans is a surname appearing in many countries. Notable people with the surname include:

- Adalberto Román (born 1987), Paraguayan football player
- Aída Román (born 1988), Mexican archer
- Alexandru Roman (1826–1897), Romanian publisher and academic, one of the founding members of the Romanian Academy
- Alison Roman (born 1985), American food writer, chef, internet personality and author of various cookbooks
- Antonino Roman (1939–2014), Filipino politician
- Ashton Bethel-Roman (born 2005), American football player
- Begoña Román Maestre (born 1965), Spanish philosopher, university professor, researcher
- Bernard Romans (1741–1784), Dutch-born American navigator, surveyor, cartographer, naturalist, engineer, soldier, promoter, and writer
- Brian P. Roman, American astronomer
- Christine Romans, American broadcast journalist and author, senior business correspondent for NBC News, former chief business correspondent for CNN
- Dale Romans (born 1966), American Thoroughbred racehorse trainer
- Dan, Danny or Daniel Roman, multiple people
- Federico Roman (born 1952), Italian equestrian competitor
- Francisco S. Román (1930–2016), Filipino scout
- Freddie Roman (1937–2022), American comedian
- Geraldine Roman (born 1967), Filipina journalist and politician
- Herminia Roman (born 1940), Filipina politician
- Johan Helmich Roman (1694–1758), Swedish composer
- Joshua Roman (born 1983), American cellist
- Juan Antonio Román (1942–2025), Spanish footballer
- Letícia Román (1941–2025), Italian-born film actress
- Lulu Roman (1946–2025), American comedian, singer, and author
- Michael F. Roman (born 1959/60), American executive, former chief executive officer of 3M
- Miguel Roman, Puerto Rican/American scientist
- Miguel Román (boxer) (born 1985), Mexican super featherweight boxer
- Miguel Román (footballer) (born 2002), Spanish footballer
- Mihai Roman (born 1984), Romanian football player
- Mihai Roman (footballer, born 1992), Romanian football player
- Mike Roman (born 1972), American political operative, director of Election Day Operations for the 2020 Trump campaign
- Nancy Roman (1925–2018), American astronomer
- Nick Roman (1947–2003), American football player
- Paco Román (1869–1899), Filipino-Spanish soldier and revolutionary
- Petre Roman (born 1946), Romanian politician and Prime Minister of Romania
- Phil Roman (born 1930), American animator
- Raúl Román (born 1977), Paraguayan football player
- Ric Roman (1916–2000), American actor
- Ruth Roman (1922–1999), American actress
- Stephen Boleslav Roman (1921–1988), Slovak-born Canadian mining engineer and mining executive
- Susan Roman (born 1957), Canadian voice actress
- Tony Roman (1936–1992), Slovak-born Canadian politician
- Valter Roman (1913–1983), Romanian communist activist and soldier
- Yolande Le Calvez, née Roman, (1910–2001) French geologist, palaeontologist, geological engineer

== See also ==
- Miles Romans-Hopcraft, English musician better known as Wu-Lu
- Romanes (surname)
