= Macrocneme cyanea =

Scientific classification
- Kingdom: Animalia
- Phylum: Arthropoda
- Class: Insecta
- Order: Lepidoptera
- Superfamily: Noctuoidea
- Family: Erebidae
- Subfamily: Arctiinae
- Genus: Macrocneme
- Species: M. cyanea

Binomial name
- Macrocneme cyanea (Butler, 1876)

Synonyms
- Mastigocera cyanea Butler, 1876

Species of moth

Macrocneme cyanea is a moth of the subfamily Arctiinae. It was described by Arthur Gardiner Butler in 1876. It is found in Rio de Janeiro, Brazil.
