= Poliopastea cyanescens =

Scientific classification
- Domain: Eukaryota
- Kingdom: Animalia
- Phylum: Arthropoda
- Class: Insecta
- Order: Lepidoptera
- Superfamily: Noctuoidea
- Family: Erebidae
- Subfamily: Arctiinae
- Genus: Poliopastea
- Species: P. cyanescens

Binomial name
- Poliopastea cyanescens (Dognin, 1912)

Synonyms
- Macrocneme cyanescens Dognin, 1912

Species of moth

Poliopastea cyanescens is a moth in the subfamily Arctiinae. It was described by Paul Dognin in 1912. It is found in Colombia.
