= Macrocneme maja =

Scientific classification
- Domain: Eukaryota
- Kingdom: Animalia
- Phylum: Arthropoda
- Class: Insecta
- Order: Lepidoptera
- Superfamily: Noctuoidea
- Family: Erebidae
- Subfamily: Arctiinae
- Genus: Macrocneme
- Species: M. maja

Binomial name
- Macrocneme maja (Fabricius, 1787)

Synonyms
- Zygaena maja Fabricius, 1787

Species of moth

Macrocneme maja is a moth of the subfamily Arctiinae. It was described by Johan Christian Fabricius in 1787. It is found in Pará, Brazil.
