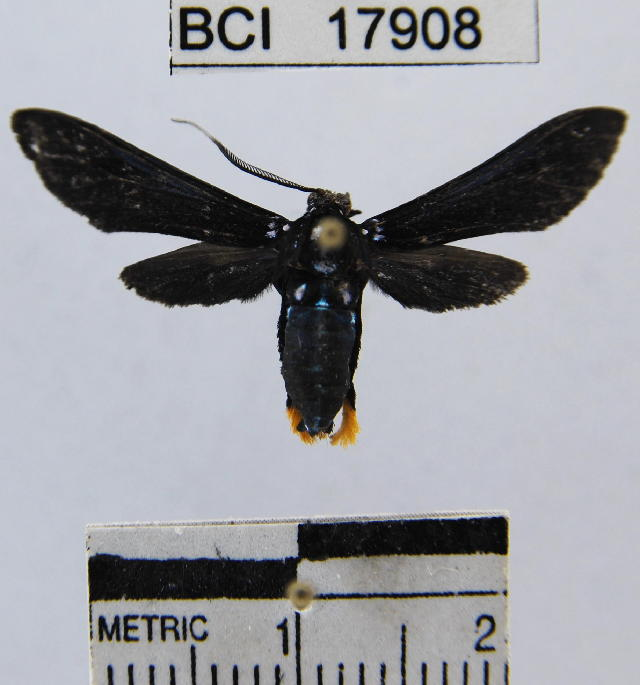
- Poliopastea auripes

Scientific classification
- Kingdom: Animalia
- Phylum: Arthropoda
- Class: Insecta
- Order: Lepidoptera
- Superfamily: Noctuoidea
- Family: Erebidae
- Subfamily: Arctiinae
- Subtribe: Euchromiina
- Genus: Poliopastea; Hampson, 1898

Synonyms
- Chrysocneme Draudt, 1917

= Poliopastea =

Genus of moths

Poliopastea is a genus of tiger moths in the family Erebidae. The genus was erected by George Hampson in 1898.

== Species ==
- Poliopastea anthracina Klages, 1906
- Poliopastea auripes (Walker, 1854)
- Poliopastea chrysotarsia Hampson, 1898
- Poliopastea clavipes (Boisduval, 1870)
- Poliopastea coelebs Bryk, 1953
- Poliopastea cyanescens (Dognin, 1912)
- Poliopastea cyllarus Druce, 1896
- Poliopastea eacus (Stoll, [1781])
- Poliopastea esmeralda Butler, 1876
- Poliopastea evelina Druce, 1884
- Poliopastea hesione Druce, 1888
- Poliopastea indistincta Butler, 1876
- Poliopastea jalapensis (Schaus, 1889)
- Poliopastea laciades (Schaus, 1889)
- Poliopastea laconia (Druce, 1884)
- Poliopastea lamprosoma Hampson, 1914
- Poliopastea maroniensis Schaus, 1905
- Poliopastea mirabilis (Draudt, 1917)
- Poliopastea nigritarsia Hampson, 1898
- Poliopastea nordina Schaus, 1901
- Poliopastea obscura (Wallengren, 1860)
- Poliopastea plumbea Hampson, 1898
- Poliopastea splendida Butler, 1876
- Poliopastea vittata (Walker, 1854)
