= Horama zapata =

Scientific classification
- Domain: Eukaryota
- Kingdom: Animalia
- Phylum: Arthropoda
- Class: Insecta
- Order: Lepidoptera
- Superfamily: Noctuoidea
- Family: Erebidae
- Subfamily: Arctiinae
- Genus: Horama
- Species: H. zapata

Binomial name
- Horama zapata Dietz & Duckworth, 1976

Species of moth

Horama zapata is a moth of the subfamily Arctiinae. It was described by Robert E. Dietz IV and W. Donald Duckworth in 1976. It is found on Cuba and the Bahamas.
