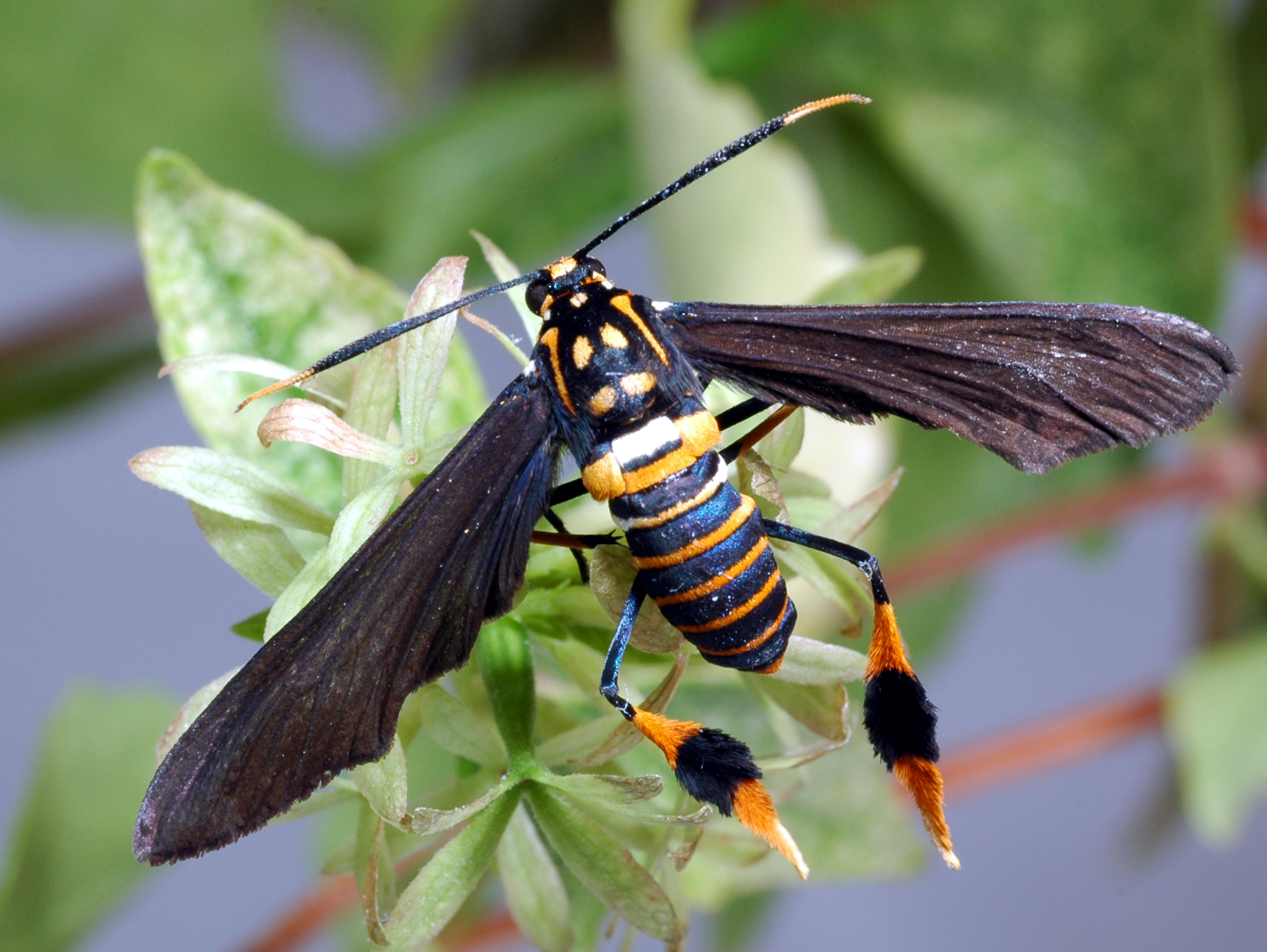

Scientific classification
- Kingdom: Animalia
- Phylum: Arthropoda
- Class: Insecta
- Order: Lepidoptera
- Superfamily: Noctuoidea
- Family: Erebidae
- Subfamily: Arctiinae
- Genus: Horama
- Species: H. panthalon

Binomial name
- Horama panthalon (Fabricius, 1793)

Synonyms
- Zygaena panthalon Fabricius, 1793; Mastigocera tibialis Butler, 1876; Horama serena Schaus, 1924; Horama stoneri Lindsey, 1926; Horama tibialis; Callicarus texanus Grote, 1866

= Horama panthalon =

Species of moth

Horama panthalon, the Texas wasp moth, is a moth of the subfamily Arctiinae. The species was first described by Johan Christian Fabricius in 1793. It is found in South America, Central America, Mexico, the Antilles and southern United States.

The wingspan is 32–34 mm (1.3–1.3 in). Adults are on wing year round. They mimic a paper wasp (Polistes species).

== Subspecies ==
There are three subspecies:

- Horama panthalon panthalon (Panama, north Colombia, north Venezuela and the Antilles)
- Horama panthalon texana (Grote, 1868) (south Texas, Arizona, New Mexico, Florida, Mexico and Guatemala)
- Horama panthalon viridifusca (Schaus, 1904) (south Brazil, north Argentina, Bolivia and Paraguay)
