= Macrocneme cupreipennis =

Scientific classification
- Kingdom: Animalia
- Phylum: Arthropoda
- Class: Insecta
- Order: Lepidoptera
- Superfamily: Noctuoidea
- Family: Erebidae
- Subfamily: Arctiinae
- Genus: Macrocneme
- Species: M. cupreipennis

Binomial name
- Macrocneme cupreipennis Walker, 1856

Species of moth

Macrocneme cupreipennis is a moth of the subfamily Arctiinae. It was described by Francis Walker in 1856. It is found in Brazil.
