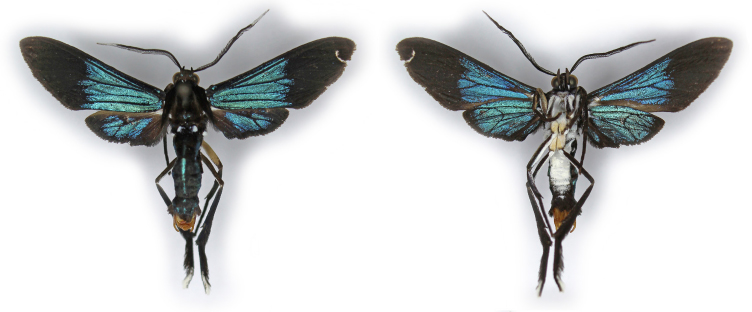

Scientific classification
- Kingdom: Animalia
- Phylum: Arthropoda
- Class: Insecta
- Order: Lepidoptera
- Superfamily: Noctuoidea
- Family: Erebidae
- Subfamily: Arctiinae
- Genus: Macrocneme
- Species: M. thyra

Binomial name
- Macrocneme thyra Möschler, 1883

= Macrocneme thyra =

Species of moth

Macrocneme thyra is a moth of the subfamily Arctiinae. It was described by Heinrich Benno Möschler in 1883. It is found in Suriname, Peru, Trinidad, Colombia, Bolivia and Pará, Brazil.
