= Macrocneme cinyras =

Scientific classification
- Domain: Eukaryota
- Kingdom: Animalia
- Phylum: Arthropoda
- Class: Insecta
- Order: Lepidoptera
- Superfamily: Noctuoidea
- Family: Erebidae
- Subfamily: Arctiinae
- Genus: Macrocneme
- Species: M. cinyras

Binomial name
- Macrocneme cinyras Schaus, 1889

Species of moth

Macrocneme cinyras is a moth of the subfamily Arctiinae. It was described by William Schaus in 1889. It is found in Mexico.
