= Horama pretus =

Scientific classification
- Domain: Eukaryota
- Kingdom: Animalia
- Phylum: Arthropoda
- Class: Insecta
- Order: Lepidoptera
- Superfamily: Noctuoidea
- Family: Erebidae
- Subfamily: Arctiinae
- Genus: Horama
- Species: H. pretus

Binomial name
- Horama pretus (Cramer, [1777])

Synonyms
- Sphinx pretus Cramer, [1777]; Zygaena eunolphus Fabricius, 1787; Mastigocera vespina Harris, 1839

Species of moth

Horama pretus is a moth of the subfamily Arctiinae. It was described by Pieter Cramer in 1777. It is found on the West Indies and in Venezuela.

Adults are thought to be a Müllerian mimic of Polister major.

The larvae feed on Cassinae xylocarpa.
