= Viñuela =

La Viñuela
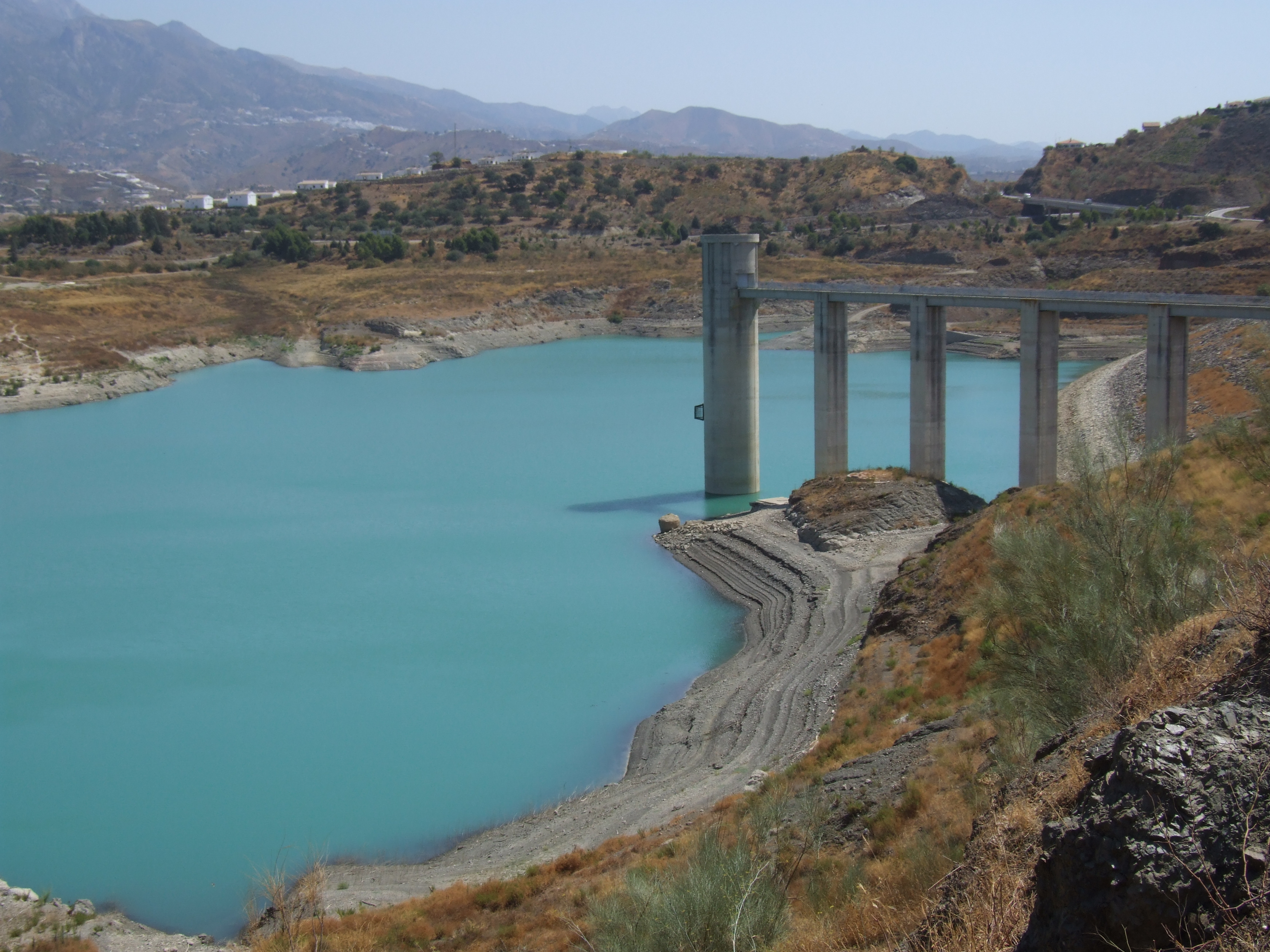
- Lake Viñuela

- Coat of arms

- Location in Andalusia
- Coordinates: 36°51′N 4°08′W
- Country: Spain
- Autonomous Community: Andalusia
- Province: Málaga
- Comarca: Axarquía - Costa del Sol

Government
  - Type: Mayor–council
  - Body: Ayuntamiento de La Viñuela.
  - Mayor: Juan José Jiménez López (PSOE)

Area
  - Urban: 27.22 km^{2} (10.51 sq mi)
- Elevation: 162 m (531 ft)

Population (2021)
  - City: 2,045
  - Density: 75.13/km^{2} (194.6/sq mi)
  - Urban: 591
  - Metro: 1,454
- Demonym: Viñoleros
- Time zone: UTC+1 (CET)
  - Summer (DST): UTC+2 (CEST)
- Postcode: 29712 and 29713
- Calling code: +34 (Spain) 95 (Málaga)
- Municipal location in the province of Málaga.

La Viñuela is a municipality in the province of Málaga in the autonomous community of Andalusia in southern Spain. It belongs to the comarca of La Axarquía. The village of La Viñuela is situated 45 kilometres (28 mi) from the provincial capital of Málaga and 19 kilometres (12 mi) from the coast at Torre del Mar. The village sits at a height of 162 metres (531 ft) above sea level. Inhabitants are called viñoleros. One of its hamlets is Los Romanes.

La Viñuela is dominated by the landscape of La Maroma, which belongs to the mountain range known as Sierra de Tejeda and at a height of 2,068 metres (6,785 ft) is the highest mountain in Axarquía. Another dominant feature of the landscape is that of the reservoir known in English as Lake Viñuela; it holds 170 million cubic metres of water and is surrounded by picnic areas, some with barbecues. Swimming and non-motorised water sports are also permitted here.

== Climate ==
- Average temperature: 17 °C
- Hours of sun per year: 2900
- Rainfall: 568 L/m^{2}

== History ==
The village grew during the 18th century around a building called La Venta La Viña, which fed and watered weary travellers en route between the coast and inland Granada, which is still a centre for the old men of the village to meet for a game of dominoes. The village was named after the vines that grow in the area and from this building where local wine was sold. In 2011 the population was 1980 inhabitants according to data from the INE, the Spanish Institute of National Statistics.

It became a town in 1764 with its first appointed mayor Juan Lucas García del Rey, however, this was not the first time the area had been inhabited: when the excavation work to create the reservoir began, 14 archaeological sites dating back to Neolithic and Roman times were found, including the remains of wattle and daub huts, a smelting furnace and an abundance of stone tools and ceramics.

== Politics ==
List of mayors since the democratic elections of 1979
Term	Mayor	Political party
1979–1983	Juan García Clavero	PSOE
1983–1987	Juan García Clavero	PSOE
1987–1991	Juan García Clavero	PSOE
1991–1995	Juan García Clavero	PSOE
1995–1999	Juan Millán Jabalera	PSOE
1999–2003	Juan Millán Jabalera	PSOE
2003–2007	Juan Millán Jabalera	PSOE
2007–2011	Juan Millán Jabalera (Resigned); Juan J. Jiménez López (Since 2011)	PSOE; PSOE
2011–2015	Juan J. Jiménez López	PSOE
2015–2019	Juan J. Jiménez López	PSOE
2019–2023	Juan J. Jiménez López	PSOE
2023–	n/d	n/d

== Monuments and places of interest ==
- Chapel of Our Lady of Sorrows
- San José Church
- Embalse de La Viñuela (Lake Viñuela)
- Atalaya Tower
- The Miraculous Chapel

== Local festivities ==
The local fiestas begin at Easter, usually mid-March or April. In May there is the pilgrimage from the village to the hamlets of Los Gómez and Los Romanes. In mid-July they celebrate the Feria de Los Gómez in honour of the Virgen del Carmen. At the end of July/beginning of August are the celebrations for the feast day of the town's patron saint, the Virgen de las Angustias (the Virgin of Sorrows) at the Chapel of Our Lady of Sorrows which is located in the area of Los Ramírez. Mid-August sees the fiesta of Los Romanes, which honours the Virgen de la Milagrosa (Virgin of the Miraculous). Finally, in mid-September, they celebrate the Feria de la Pasa, to coincide with the harvesting of grapes to be made into raisins.

== Gastronomy ==
Some typical dishes from La Viñuela are sopa de tomate (tomato soup), gazpachuelo (similar to hot gazpacho), potaje (vegetables and pulses cooked in water), migas with orange and pomegranate, ajoblanco, gazpacho, asparagus omelette and Russian salad with orange.

== Leisure Activities ==
There is a local football club aptly named Aston Viñuela which has male adult team in the local league and a male veteran side for over 35's. Recently, they have become involved in Walking Football for anyone aged 60 or over and are currently competing in Spain's first walking football league. Training and home games are played at the municipal football pitch located on the A402 (turning for the Hotel La Viñuela).

There is also a local photographic club called Lake Viñuela Photographic Club.

== See also ==
- List of municipalities in Málaga
