= Horama margarita =

Scientific classification
- Kingdom: Animalia
- Phylum: Arthropoda
- Class: Insecta
- Order: Lepidoptera
- Superfamily: Noctuoidea
- Family: Erebidae
- Subfamily: Arctiinae
- Genus: Horama
- Species: H. margarita

Binomial name
- Horama margarita McCabe, 1992

Species of moth

Horama margarita is a moth of the subfamily Arctiinae. It was described by Timothy L. McCabe in 1992. It is found in Cuba.
