= Macrocneme viridis =

Scientific classification
- Domain: Eukaryota
- Kingdom: Animalia
- Phylum: Arthropoda
- Class: Insecta
- Order: Lepidoptera
- Superfamily: Noctuoidea
- Family: Erebidae
- Subfamily: Arctiinae
- Genus: Macrocneme
- Species: M. viridis

Binomial name
- Macrocneme viridis (H. Druce, 1883)

Synonyms
- Chloropsinus viridis H. Druce, 1883; Poliopastea viridis

Species of moth

Macrocneme viridis is a moth in the family Erebidae. It was described by Herbert Druce in 1883. It is found in Ecuador.
