= Poliopastea cyllarus =

Scientific classification
- Domain: Eukaryota
- Kingdom: Animalia
- Phylum: Arthropoda
- Class: Insecta
- Order: Lepidoptera
- Superfamily: Noctuoidea
- Family: Erebidae
- Subfamily: Arctiinae
- Genus: Poliopastea
- Species: P. cyllarus

Binomial name
- Poliopastea cyllarus Druce, 1896

Synonyms
- Macrocneme cyllarus

Species of moth

Poliopastea cyllarus is a moth of the family Erebidae. It is found in Panama, Colombia and Pará, Brazil.
