= Poliopastea nordina =

Scientific classification
- Kingdom: Animalia
- Phylum: Arthropoda
- Class: Insecta
- Order: Lepidoptera
- Superfamily: Noctuoidea
- Family: Erebidae
- Subfamily: Arctiinae
- Genus: Poliopastea
- Species: P. nordina

Binomial name
- Poliopastea nordina Schaus, 1901

Synonyms
- Poliopastea nordina f. altilis Draudt, 1915

Species of moth

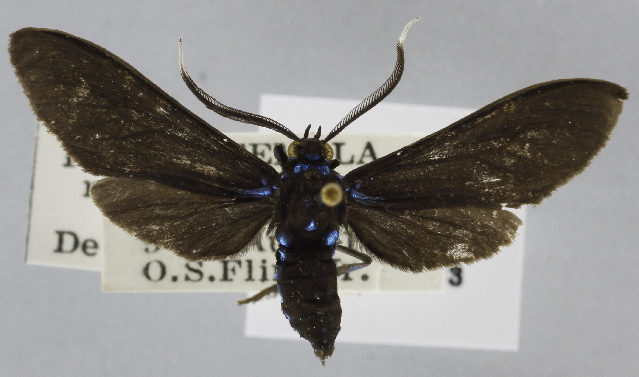

Poliopastea nordina is a moth in the subfamily Arctiinae. It was described by William Schaus in 1901. It is found in Mexico.
