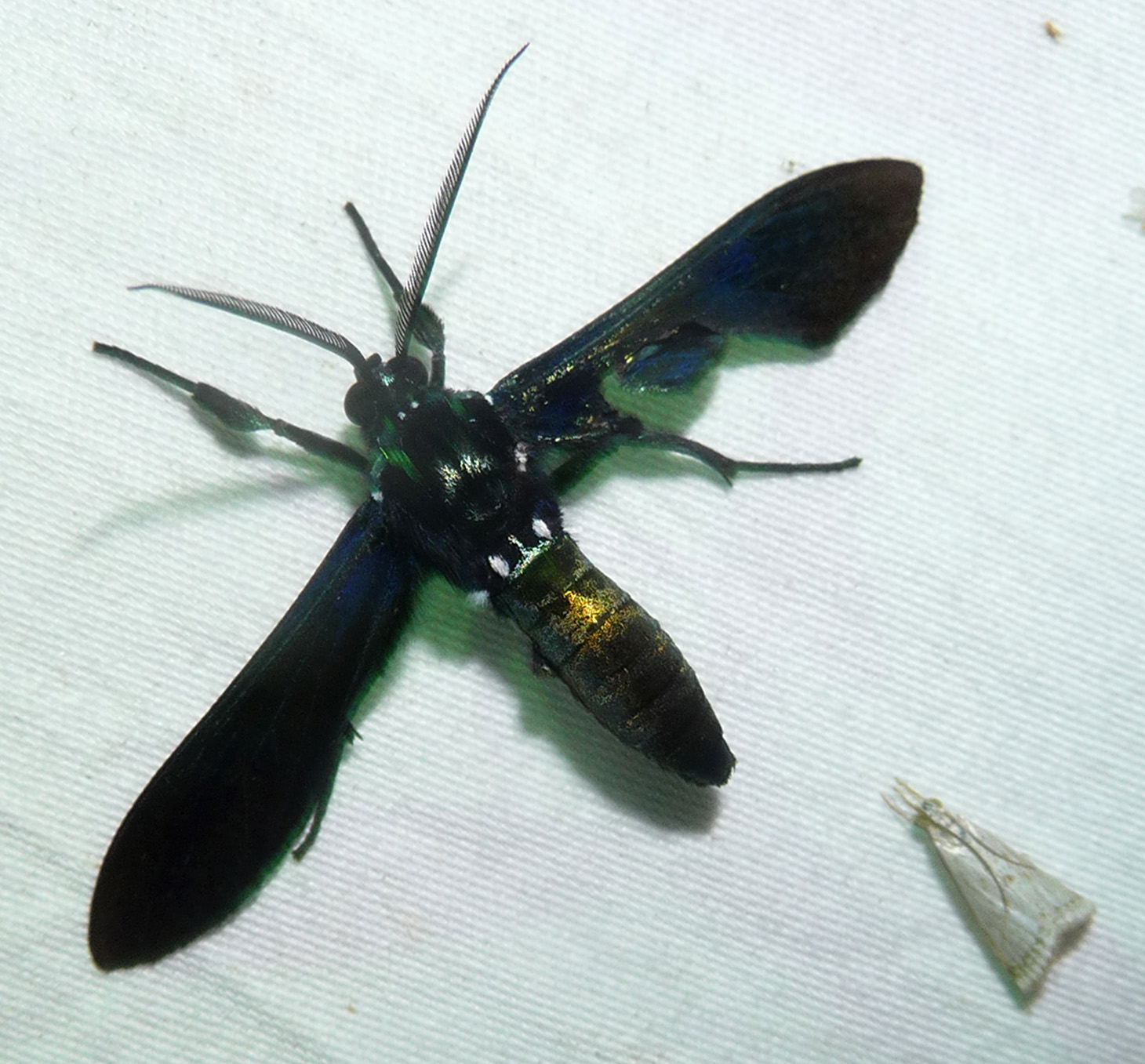

Scientific classification
- Kingdom: Animalia
- Phylum: Arthropoda
- Class: Insecta
- Order: Lepidoptera
- Superfamily: Noctuoidea
- Family: Erebidae
- Subfamily: Arctiinae
- Genus: Macrocneme
- Species: M. chrysitis

Binomial name
- Macrocneme chrysitis (Guérin-Méneville, [1844])

Synonyms
- Glaucopis chrysitis Guérin-Méneville, [1844]; Macrocneme iole H. Druce, 1884

= Macrocneme chrysitis =

Species of moth

Macrocneme chrysitis, the southern cyan tiger moth, is a moth of the subfamily Arctiinae. It was described by Félix Édouard Guérin-Méneville in 1844. It is found in Texas, Mexico, Guatemala, Nicaragua, Panama and Rio Grande do Sul, Brazil.
