= Poliopastea obscura =

Scientific classification
- Kingdom: Animalia
- Phylum: Arthropoda
- Class: Insecta
- Order: Lepidoptera
- Superfamily: Noctuoidea
- Family: Erebidae
- Subfamily: Arctiinae
- Genus: Poliopastea
- Species: P. obscura

Binomial name
- Poliopastea obscura (Wallengren, 1860)

Synonyms
- Tipulodes obscura Wallengren, 1860; Chloropsinus nox Druce, 1898

Species of moth

Poliopastea obscura is a moth in the subfamily Arctiinae. It was described by Wallengren in 1860. It is found on Saint Lucia and in Ecuador.
