= Poliopastea lamprosoma =

Scientific classification
- Kingdom: Animalia
- Phylum: Arthropoda
- Class: Insecta
- Order: Lepidoptera
- Superfamily: Noctuoidea
- Family: Erebidae
- Subfamily: Arctiinae
- Genus: Poliopastea
- Species: P. lamprosoma

Binomial name
- Poliopastea lamprosoma (Hampson, 1914)

Synonyms
- Macrocneme lamprosoma Hampson, 1914

Species of moth

Poliopastea lamprosoma is a moth in the subfamily Arctiinae. It was described by George Hampson in 1914. It is found in Panama.
