= Poliopastea anthracina =

Scientific classification
- Domain: Eukaryota
- Kingdom: Animalia
- Phylum: Arthropoda
- Class: Insecta
- Order: Lepidoptera
- Superfamily: Noctuoidea
- Family: Erebidae
- Subfamily: Arctiinae
- Genus: Poliopastea
- Species: P. anthracina

Binomial name
- Poliopastea anthracina (Klages, 1906)

Synonyms
- Saurita anthracina Klages, 1906; Poliopastea ockendeni Rothschild, 1911; Macrocneme ockendeni

Species of moth

Poliopastea anthracina is a moth in the subfamily Arctiinae. It was described by Edward A. Klages in 1906. It is found in Venezuela and Guyana.
