= Poliopastea coelebs =

Scientific classification
- Kingdom: Animalia
- Phylum: Arthropoda
- Class: Insecta
- Order: Lepidoptera
- Superfamily: Noctuoidea
- Family: Erebidae
- Subfamily: Arctiinae
- Genus: Poliopastea
- Species: P. coelebs

Binomial name
- Poliopastea coelebs Bryk, 1953

Species of moth

Poliopastea coelebs is a moth in the subfamily Arctiinae. It was described by Felix Bryk in 1953. It is found in the Amazon region.
