= Horama oedippus =

Scientific classification
- Domain: Eukaryota
- Kingdom: Animalia
- Phylum: Arthropoda
- Class: Insecta
- Order: Lepidoptera
- Superfamily: Noctuoidea
- Family: Erebidae
- Subfamily: Arctiinae
- Genus: Horama
- Species: H. oedippus

Binomial name
- Horama oedippus (Boisduval, 1870)

Synonyms
- Mastogocera oedippus Boisduval, 1870

Species of moth

Horama oedippus is a moth of the subfamily Arctiinae. It was described by Jean Baptiste Boisduval in 1870. It is found in Mexico and Guatemala.
