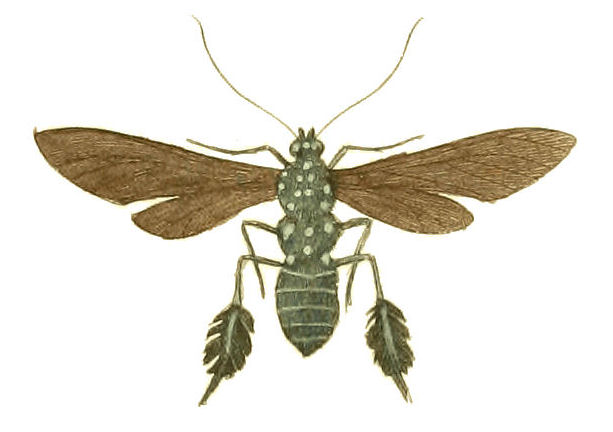

Scientific classification
- Domain: Eukaryota
- Kingdom: Animalia
- Phylum: Arthropoda
- Class: Insecta
- Order: Lepidoptera
- Superfamily: Noctuoidea
- Family: Erebidae
- Subfamily: Arctiinae
- Genus: Horama
- Species: H. plumipes

Binomial name
- Horama plumipes (Drury, 1773)

Synonyms
- Sphinx plumipes Drury, 1773; Callicarus plumipes; Phylloecia punctata Guérin-Méneville, [1844]; Horama jalapensis Neumoegen, 1890

= Horama plumipes =

Species of moth

Horama plumipes is a moth of the subfamily Arctiinae. It was described by Dru Drury in 1773. It is found in southern Texas, Mexico, Honduras, Belize, Guatemala and Nicaragua.

== Description ==
Upperside: Antennae black, but whitish at the tips; being thickest in the middle. Head black, with a white spot in front between the antennæ. Neck black, with three white spots on it. Thorax black, with several white spots thereon. Abdomen black, with several narrow white rings. Wings dark brown, immaculate.

Underside: Palpi white. Tongue spiral. Breast black, spotted with white on its sides. Abdomen black, having one broad white ring on it, and several narrow ones. Legs long and black. Thighs white. Hinder legs furnished with tufts of hairs of a black colour, placed in such manner as to resemble the shaft of an arrow; the legs, above and below these tufts, being white. Wings coloured as on the upperside. Wingspan nearly 1 3/4 inches (45 mm).
