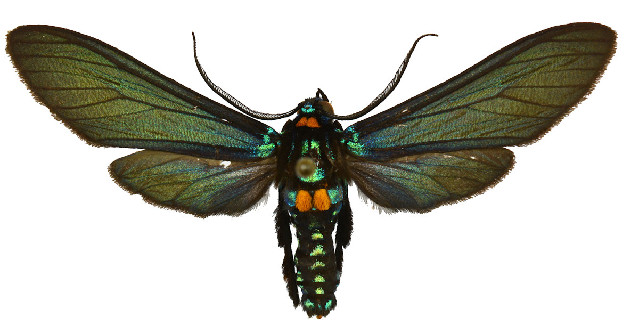

Scientific classification
- Domain: Eukaryota
- Kingdom: Animalia
- Phylum: Arthropoda
- Class: Insecta
- Order: Lepidoptera
- Superfamily: Noctuoidea
- Family: Erebidae
- Subfamily: Arctiinae
- Genus: Poliopastea
- Species: P. mirabilis

Binomial name
- Poliopastea mirabilis (Draudt, 1917)

Synonyms
- Chrysocneme mirabilis Draudt, 1917; Macrocneme apollinairei Schaus, 1928; Macrocneme xantholopha Dognin, 1919

= Poliopastea mirabilis =

Species of moth

Poliopastea mirabilis is a moth in the subfamily Arctiinae. It was described by Max Wilhelm Karl Draudt in 1917. It is found in Colombia.
