= Poliopastea splendida =

Scientific classification
- Kingdom: Animalia
- Phylum: Arthropoda
- Clade: Pancrustacea
- Class: Insecta
- Order: Lepidoptera
- Superfamily: Noctuoidea
- Family: Erebidae
- Subfamily: Arctiinae
- Genus: Poliopastea
- Species: P. splendida

Binomial name
- Poliopastea splendida Butler, 1876

Synonyms
- Macrocneme splendida

Species of moth

Poliopastea splendida is a moth of the subfamily Arctiinae. It was described by Arthur Gardiner Butler in 1876.
