= Macrocneme adonis =

Scientific classification
- Domain: Eukaryota
- Kingdom: Animalia
- Phylum: Arthropoda
- Class: Insecta
- Order: Lepidoptera
- Superfamily: Noctuoidea
- Family: Erebidae
- Subfamily: Arctiinae
- Genus: Macrocneme
- Species: M. adonis

Binomial name
- Macrocneme adonis H. Druce, 1884

Species of moth

Macrocneme adonis is a moth of the subfamily Arctiinae. It was described by Herbert Druce in 1884. It is found in Mexico, Guatemala and Panama.
