= Horama grotei =

Scientific classification
- Domain: Eukaryota
- Kingdom: Animalia
- Phylum: Arthropoda
- Class: Insecta
- Order: Lepidoptera
- Superfamily: Noctuoidea
- Family: Erebidae
- Subfamily: Arctiinae
- Genus: Horama
- Species: H. grotei

Binomial name
- Horama grotei Butler, 1876

Species of moth

Horama grotei is a moth of the subfamily Arctiinae. It was described by Arthur Gardiner Butler in 1876. It is found on Jamaica. This species was named in honor of Augustus Radcliffe Grote.
