= Horama tarsalis =

Scientific classification
- Kingdom: Animalia
- Phylum: Arthropoda
- Class: Insecta
- Order: Lepidoptera
- Superfamily: Noctuoidea
- Family: Erebidae
- Subfamily: Arctiinae
- Genus: Horama
- Species: H. tarsalis

Binomial name
- Horama tarsalis Walker, 1856

Species of moth

Horama tarsalis is a moth of the subfamily Arctiinae. It was described by Francis Walker in 1856. It is found on Haiti.
