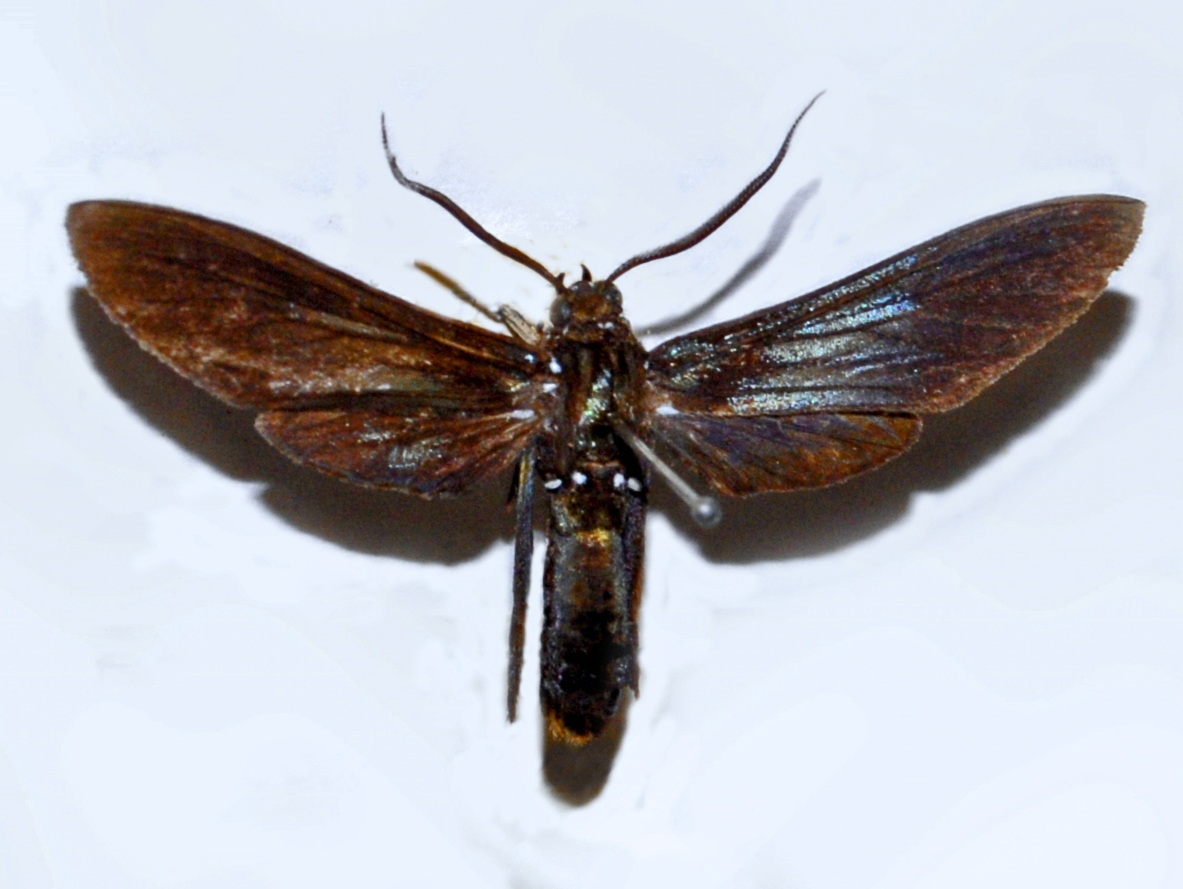
- Mounted specimen

Scientific classification
- Domain: Eukaryota
- Kingdom: Animalia
- Phylum: Arthropoda
- Class: Insecta
- Order: Lepidoptera
- Superfamily: Noctuoidea
- Family: Erebidae
- Subfamily: Arctiinae
- Genus: Macrocneme
- Species: M. lades

Binomial name
- Macrocneme lades (Cramer, [1775])

Synonyms
- Sphinx lades Cramer, [1775]; Macrocneme lades cabimensis Dyar, 1914

= Macrocneme lades =

Species of moth

Macrocneme lades is a moth of the subfamily Arctiinae. It was described by Pieter Cramer in 1775.

== Description ==
Macrocneme lades has a wingspan of about 43 millimetres (1.7 in). The wings have a shining greenish steel color.

== Distribution ==
This species cab be found in Mexico, Honduras, Guatemala, Costa Rica, Panama, Venezuela, Colombia, Suriname, Brazil (Espirito Santo, Para) and Peru.
