= Poliopastea nigritarsia =

Scientific classification
- Kingdom: Animalia
- Phylum: Arthropoda
- Class: Insecta
- Order: Lepidoptera
- Superfamily: Noctuoidea
- Family: Erebidae
- Subfamily: Arctiinae
- Genus: Poliopastea
- Species: P. nigritarsia

Binomial name
- Poliopastea nigritarsia Hampson, 1898

Synonyms
- Macrocneme nigritarsia

Species of moth

Poliopastea nigritarsia is a moth of the family Erebidae. It was described by George Hampson in 1898. It is found in Mexico, Guatemala and Trinidad.
