= Poliopastea hesione =

Scientific classification
- Domain: Eukaryota
- Kingdom: Animalia
- Phylum: Arthropoda
- Class: Insecta
- Order: Lepidoptera
- Superfamily: Noctuoidea
- Family: Erebidae
- Subfamily: Arctiinae
- Genus: Poliopastea
- Species: P. hesione

Binomial name
- Poliopastea hesione H. Druce, 1888

Synonyms
- Macrocneme hesione

Species of insect

Poliopastea hesione is a moth of the family Erebidae. It was described by Herbert Druce in 1888. It is found in Panama.
