= Poliopastea laconia =

Scientific classification
- Domain: Eukaryota
- Kingdom: Animalia
- Phylum: Arthropoda
- Class: Insecta
- Order: Lepidoptera
- Superfamily: Noctuoidea
- Family: Erebidae
- Subfamily: Arctiinae
- Genus: Poliopastea
- Species: P. laconia

Binomial name
- Poliopastea laconia (H. Druce, 1884)

Synonyms
- Callicarus laconia H. Druce, 1884; Macrocneme laconia

Species of moth

Poliopastea laconia is a moth of the family Erebidae. It was described by Herbert Druce in 1884. It is found in Mexico and Guatemala.
