= Los Romanes =

Los Romanes is a hamlet in the municipality of La Viñuela in the province of Málaga in the autonomous community of Andalusia in southern Spain.

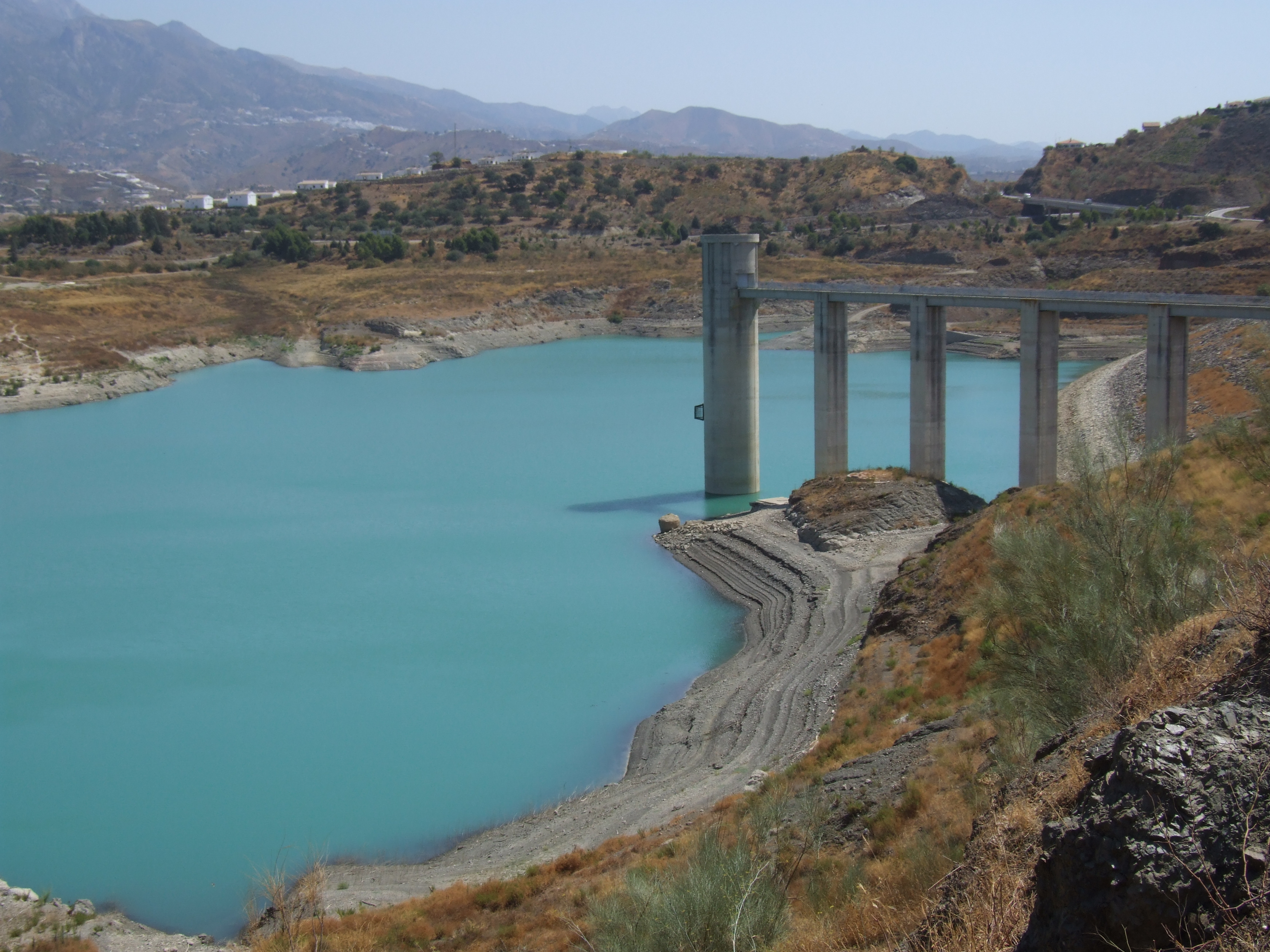
View of the dam at lake Vinuela
