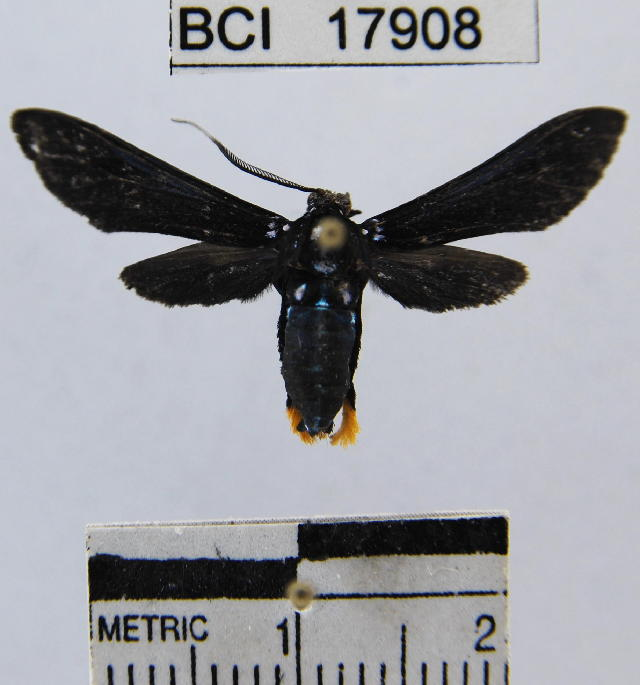

Scientific classification
- Kingdom: Animalia
- Phylum: Arthropoda
- Class: Insecta
- Order: Lepidoptera
- Superfamily: Noctuoidea
- Family: Erebidae
- Subfamily: Arctiinae
- Genus: Poliopastea
- Species: P. auripes

Binomial name
- Poliopastea auripes (Walker, 1854)

Synonyms
- Euchromia auripes Walker, 1854; Macrocneme auripes

= Poliopastea auripes =

Species of moth

Poliopastea auripes is a moth of the subfamily Arctiinae. It was described by Francis Walker in 1854. It is found in Honduras, Guatemala, Panama, Costa Rica and Colombia.
