= Poliopastea laciades =

Scientific classification
- Domain: Eukaryota
- Kingdom: Animalia
- Phylum: Arthropoda
- Class: Insecta
- Order: Lepidoptera
- Superfamily: Noctuoidea
- Family: Erebidae
- Subfamily: Arctiinae
- Genus: Poliopastea
- Species: P. laciades

Binomial name
- Poliopastea laciades (Schaus, 1889)

Synonyms
- Callicarus laciades Schaus, 1889; Callicarus misitra Schaus, 1889; Macrocneme laciades; Macrocneme misitra

Species of moth

Poliopastea laciades is a moth of the family Erebidae. It was described by William Schaus in 1889, and later classified by George Hampson in 1898. It is found in Mexico.
