= Dan Roman =

Dan, Danny or Daniel Roman may refer to:

- Dan Roman (businessman), Romanian entrepreneur, investor and IT professional
- Dan Roman (footballer, born 1982), Israeli footballer
- Dan Roman (footballer, born 1985), Romanian football striker
- Daniel Roman (boxer) (born 1990), American boxer
- Danny Roman, musician in Sister Double Happiness
- Danny Roman, a character in The Negotiator, played by Samuel L. Jackson
