= Poliopastea evelina =

Scientific classification
- Domain: Eukaryota
- Kingdom: Animalia
- Phylum: Arthropoda
- Class: Insecta
- Order: Lepidoptera
- Superfamily: Noctuoidea
- Family: Erebidae
- Subfamily: Arctiinae
- Genus: Poliopastea
- Species: P. evelina

Binomial name
- Poliopastea evelina H. Druce, 1884

Synonyms
- Macrocneme evelina

Species of moth

Poliopastea evelina is a moth of the family Erebidae. It was described by Herbert Druce in 1884. It is found in Panama.
