= Augustus Radcliffe Grote =

British entomologist (1841–1903)

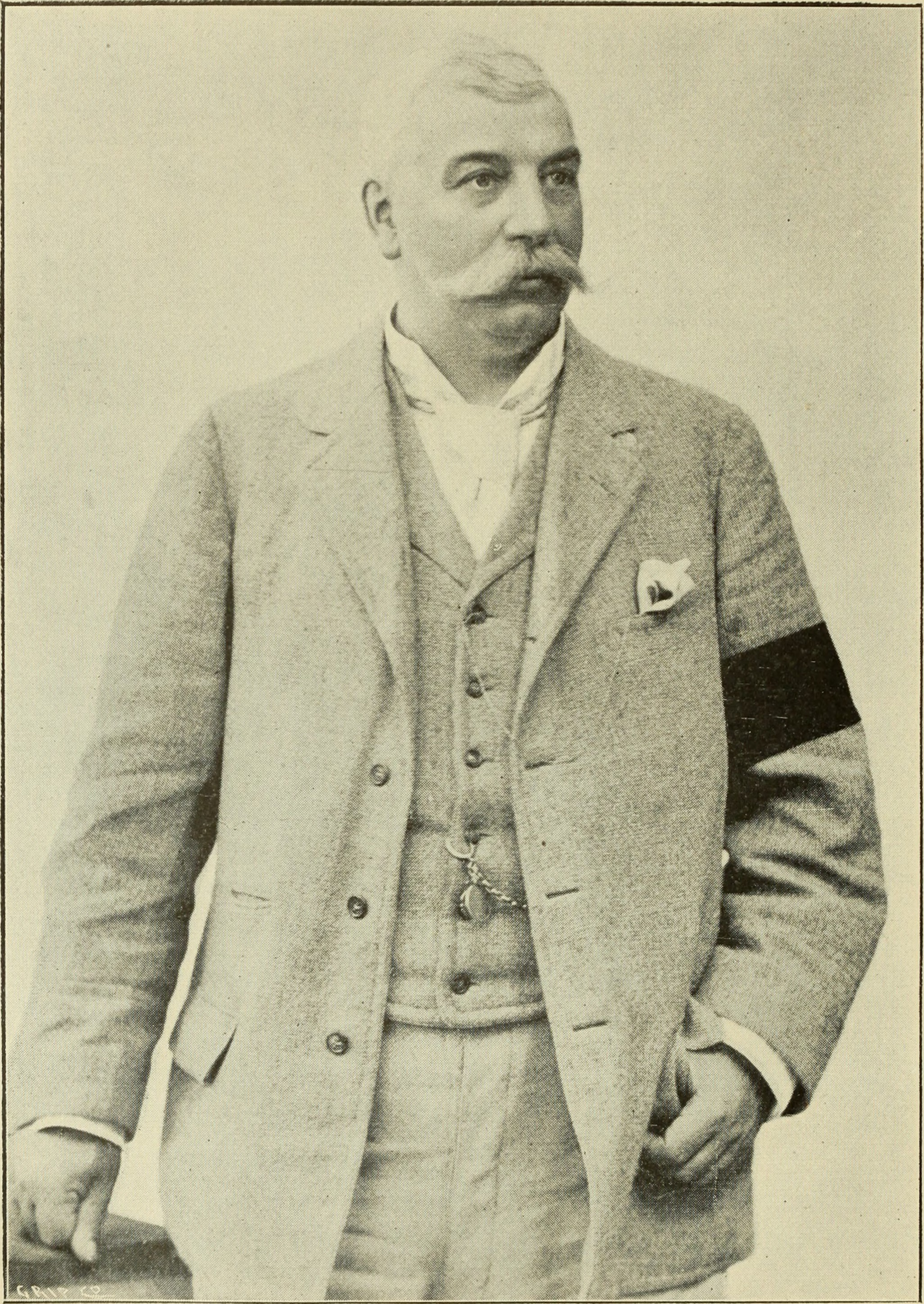
- Born: 7 February 1841; Liverpool, England
- Died: 12 September 1903 (aged 62); Hildesheim, Germany
- Scientific career
- Fields: Entomology

Augustus Radcliffe Grote (February 7, 1841 – September 12, 1903) was a British entomologist who described over 1,000 species of butterflies and moths. He is best known for his work on North American Noctuidae. A number of species were named after him, including the moth Horama grotei.

== Early life and family ==
Grote was born in Aigburth, a suburb of Liverpool, in 1841. His mother was English, and his maternal grandfather, Augustus Radcliffe, was a partner in the house of Sir Joseph Bailey. Grote was a first cousin on his mother's side to Ethel Romanes.

Grote's father was born in Danzig, and his paternal lineage traced back to Dutch philosopher Hugo Grotius. His family name was changed from 'Grohté' to 'Grote' when his father became an English citizen.

Augustus Grote came to New York at age 7, one year after his parents had moved there from England, and spent his youth on Staten Island where his father had purchased a farm in New Dorp. He attended school under Joseph Deghuée where he became childhood friends with Edward Graef and Frederick Tepper, both of whom who also became entomologists. Grote's interest in entomology, and moths in particular, began at a young age as he explored the natural areas around his home on Staten Island with Graef and Tepper. Graef describes their childhood insect collecting as follows:

Equipped with the usual outfit of nets, cigar boxes, pill boxes and pins, we resorted as often as possible to the suburbs of the then relatively small city of Brooklyn. One favorite collecting spot was a vegetable garden, where now is the junction of Flatbush Ave. and Fulton St. Fort Greene Hill, now Washington Park, was another nice wild place. Then, there was the meadow, or sheep pasture, now part of Prospect Park, at that time devoted to pigeon shooting. Occasionally we took long trips to East New York, Bay Ridge and Parkville, as well as the many intervening unpopulated localities.

The entomological interest of the three boys was nurtured by John Ackhurst.

His father invested in real estate and was involved in the founding of the Staten Island Railway. An economic downturn in 1857 resulted in significant financial distress for the family and prevented Augustus' planned attendance at Harvard University. He later returned to Europe to further his education, and upon returning to the United States, attended Lafayette College, Pennsylvania, and graduated with a M.A. degree.

In 1870, Grote married a woman from Charleston, South Carolina; she died three years later in Alabama on the birth of their second child. About 10 years later he married Minna Ruyter, in Germany.

Aside from his natural history publications, Grote wrote two books on religious themes: 'The New Infidelity' and 'Genesis I, II': An Essay on the Biblical Narrative of Creation'. His other works include 'Education and the Succession of Experiences' and a book of poetry ('Rip van Winkle: A Sunmyth, and Other Poems'). Grote also composed music, though only one piece was ever sold.

While living in Buffalo, Grote served as organist at an Episcopal church.

== Career ==
Grote's formal scientific work began around 1862 with the publication of his first entomology articles. He was living in Buffalo around this time and became a member of the Buffalo Society of Natural Sciences.

From Buffalo, Grote moved to Demopolis, Alabama where he studied the cotton worm and lobbied for increased attention to the problems it caused for cotton production. His lobbying efforts were initially unsuccessful. Shortly after the death of his wife in 1873, Grote was invited by the Buffalo Society of Natural Sciences to return to Buffalo and become director of its museum; he accepted the invitation and served in this capacity for seven years. His efforts greatly expanded the museum's collection such that when he left Buffalo in 1880, it held specimens of over 1,000 Noctuid species and 505 type specimens. This collection was subsequently sold to the British Museum.

In 1878, Grote traveled to Florida, Georgia, and Alabama by appointment of the United States Entomological Commission to study insects injurious to cotton plants, with his work incorporated into the commission's report in 1885. Grote had earlier been disappointed he had not been selected to serve on the commission itself, and attributed this perceived oversight to the "adverse influence of Dr. Riley, and for many years he took every opportunity of criticizing in vehement language the work of this distinguished Entomologist."

In July 1879, he began publication of The North American Entomologist, though only one volume of 12 issues was published. He served on the editorial committee of the journal The Practical Entomologist and the publication committee of Papilio.

Shortly after the death of his father, Grote moved back to Staten Island in 1880, taking up residence in New Brighton where he entertained friends such as C.H. Fernald and Henry Edwards.

Grote moved to Bremen, Germany, in 1884 and tried, unsuccessfully, to obtain a position at the British Museum. In 1895, he moved to Hildesheim, where he took a position at the Roemer und Pelizaeus Museum. He continued to publish papers on North American Lepidoptera while in Germany.

Grote was a fellow of the Entomological Society of London and an honorary member of both the Entomological Society of Canada and the American Entomological Society. He was elected as a member to the American Philosophical Society in 1876.

He published many articles, primarily on North American Lepidoptera, in the Bulletin of the Buffalo Society of Natural History, The Canadian Entomologist, and numerous other journals. Non-entomology articles include 'Descriptions of new crustaceans from the water lime group' and 'On the peopling of North America'. Several of his public lectures were published in Scientific American and Popular Science Monthly.

== Death ==
Grote died after a long and painful bout of endocarditis in Hildesheim in 1903 at age 62, and was survived by his wife, Minna, and six children.
