= Poliopastea plumbea =

Scientific classification
- Kingdom: Animalia
- Phylum: Arthropoda
- Class: Insecta
- Order: Lepidoptera
- Superfamily: Noctuoidea
- Family: Erebidae
- Subfamily: Arctiinae
- Genus: Poliopastea
- Species: P. plumbea

Binomial name
- Poliopastea plumbea Hampson, 1898

Synonyms
- Macrocneme albitarsia Hampson, 1898

Species of moth

Poliopastea plumbea is a moth in the subfamily Arctiinae. It was described by George Hampson in 1898. It is found in the lower Amazon region.
