= Poliopastea clavipes =

Scientific classification
- Kingdom: Animalia
- Phylum: Arthropoda
- Class: Insecta
- Order: Lepidoptera
- Superfamily: Noctuoidea
- Family: Erebidae
- Subfamily: Arctiinae
- Genus: Poliopastea
- Species: P. clavipes

Binomial name
- Poliopastea clavipes (Boisduval, 1870)

Synonyms
- Mastigocera clavipes Boisduval, 1870; Drucea clavipes; Horama clavipes

Species of moth

Poliopastea clavipes is a moth in the subfamily Arctiinae. It was described by Jean Baptiste Boisduval in 1870. It is found from Texas, Mexico, Guatemala and Costa Rica to Venezuela.
