= Poliopastea esmeralda =

Scientific classification
- Domain: Eukaryota
- Kingdom: Animalia
- Phylum: Arthropoda
- Class: Insecta
- Order: Lepidoptera
- Superfamily: Noctuoidea
- Family: Erebidae
- Subfamily: Arctiinae
- Genus: Poliopastea
- Species: P. esmeralda

Binomial name
- Poliopastea esmeralda Butler, 1876

Synonyms
- Macrocneme esmeralda

Species of moth

Poliopastea esmeralda is a moth of the family Erebidae. It was described by Arthur Gardiner Butler in 1876. It is found in Panama and Tefé, Brazil.
