= Poliopastea eacus =

Scientific classification
- Domain: Eukaryota
- Kingdom: Animalia
- Phylum: Arthropoda
- Class: Insecta
- Order: Lepidoptera
- Superfamily: Noctuoidea
- Family: Erebidae
- Subfamily: Arctiinae
- Genus: Poliopastea
- Species: P. eacus

Binomial name
- Poliopastea eacus (Stoll, [1781])

Synonyms
- Sphinx eacus Stoll, [1781] (preocc.); Pseudomya errans Hübner, [1819]; Mastigocera pusilla Butler, 1876; Macrocneme aeacus; Macrocneme eacus; Poliopastea errans; Poliopastea pusilla

Species of moth

Poliopastea eacus is a moth of the subfamily Arctiinae. It was described by Caspar Stoll in 1781. It is found in Suriname and Pará, Brazil.
