= Poliopastea chrysotarsia =

- Poliopastea chrysotarsia

Scientific classification
- Kingdom: Animalia
- Phylum: Arthropoda
- Class: Insecta
- Order: Lepidoptera
- Superfamily: Noctuoidea
- Family: Erebidae
- Subfamily: Arctiinae
- Genus: Poliopastea
- Species: P. chrysotarsia

Binomial name
- Poliopastea chrysotarsia Hampson, 1898

Synonyms
- Macrocneme chrysotarsia

Species of moth

Poliopastea chrysotarsia is a moth of the family Erebidae. It was described by George Hampson in 1898. It is found in Panama.
