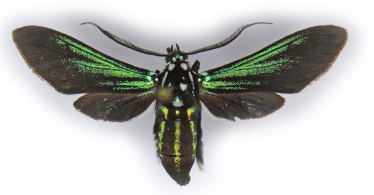
- Poliopastea vittata

Scientific classification
- Kingdom: Animalia
- Phylum: Arthropoda
- Class: Insecta
- Order: Lepidoptera
- Superfamily: Noctuoidea
- Family: Erebidae
- Subfamily: Arctiinae
- Genus: Poliopastea
- Species: P. vittata

Binomial name
- Poliopastea vittata (Walker, 1854)

Synonyms
- Euchromia vittata Walker, 1854; Macrocneme alesa Druce, 1890; Macrocneme caurensis Klages, 1906; Macrocneme nigritarsia ab. trinitatensis Strand, 1917; Macrocneme vittata

= Poliopastea vittata =

Species of moth

Poliopastea vittata is a moth of the family Erebidae. It was described by Francis Walker in 1854. It is found in Pará, Brazil.
