= Poliopastea jalapensis =

Scientific classification
- Domain: Eukaryota
- Kingdom: Animalia
- Phylum: Arthropoda
- Class: Insecta
- Order: Lepidoptera
- Superfamily: Noctuoidea
- Family: Erebidae
- Subfamily: Arctiinae
- Genus: Poliopastea
- Species: P. jalapensis

Binomial name
- Poliopastea jalapensis (Schaus, 1889)

Synonyms
- Callicarus jalapensis Schaus, 1889; Macrocneme jalapensis

Species of moth

Poliopastea jalapensis is a moth of the family Erebidae. It was described by William Schaus in 1889. It is found in Mexico.
