= George Romanes =

Canadian-Scots biologist and physiologist (1848–1894)

George Romanes FRS
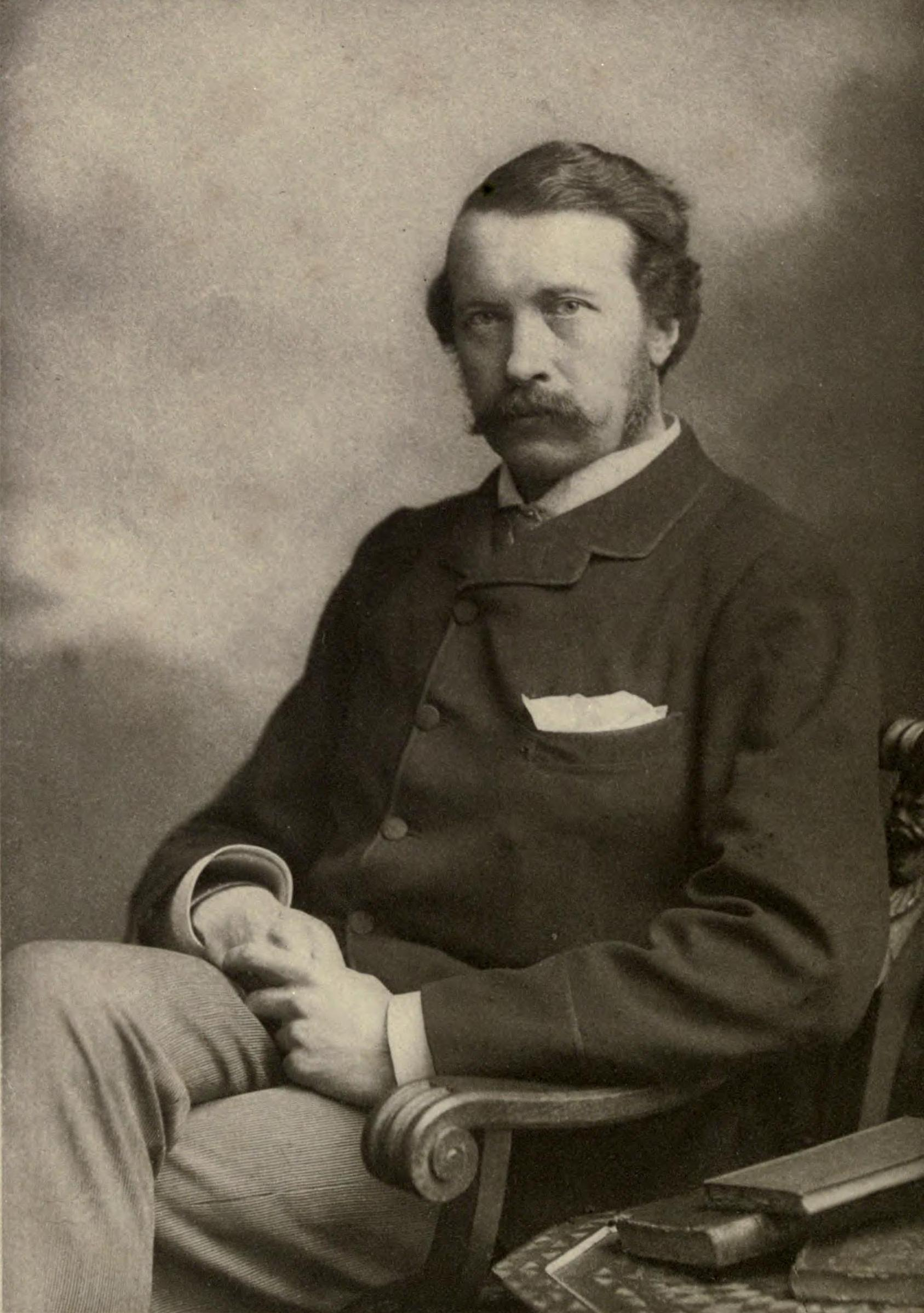
- Photograph by Elliott & Fry
- Born: 20 May 1848; Kingston, Canada West (now Ontario), Canada
- Died: 23 May 1894 (aged 46); Oxford, Oxfordshire, England
- Citizenship: British
- Education: Gonville and Caius College, Cambridge
- Known for: Comparative psychology
- Spouse: Ethel Duncan (m. 1879)
- Children: 6
- Scientific career
- Fields: Evolutionary biology Physiology

Signature
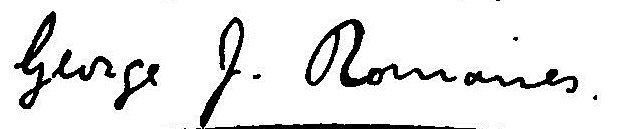

George John Romanes FRS (20 May 1848 – 23 May 1894) was a Canadian-Scots evolutionary biologist and physiologist who laid the foundation of what he called comparative psychology, postulating a similarity of cognitive processes and mechanisms between humans and other animals.

He was the youngest of Charles Darwin's academic friends, and his views on evolution are historically important. He popularized the term neo-Darwinism, which in the late 19th century was considered as a theory of evolution that focuses on natural selection as the main evolutionary force. Romanes' early death was a loss to the cause of evolutionary biology in Britain. Within six years Mendel's work was rediscovered, and a whole new agenda opened up for debate.

== Early life ==
George Romanes was born in Kingston, Canada West (now Ontario), in 1848, the youngest of three children, all boys, in a well-to-do and intellectually cultivated family. His father was Rev George Romanes (1805–1871), a Scottish Presbyterian minister. Two years after his birth, his parents moved to Cornwall Terrace in London, United Kingdom, which would set Romanes on the path to a fruitful and lasting relationship with Charles Darwin. During his youth, Romanes resided temporarily in Germany and Italy, developing a fluency in both German and Italian. His early education was inconsistent, undertaken partly in public schools, and partly at home. He developed an early love for poetry and music, at which he excelled. However, his true passion resided elsewhere, and the young Romanes decided to study science, abandoning a prior ambition to become a clergyman like his father.

== Adulthood ==
Although he came from an educated home, his school education was erratic. He entered university half-educated and with little knowledge of the ways of the world. He studied medicine and physiology, graduating from Gonville and Caius College, Cambridge with the degree of BA in 1871, and is commemorated there by a stained glass window in the chapel.

It was at Cambridge that he first came to the attention of Charles Darwin: "How glad I am that you are so young!" said Darwin. Forging a relationship with Darwin was not difficult for Romanes, who reputedly inherited a "sweetness of temper and calmness of manner" from his father. The two remained friends for life. Guided by Michael Foster, Romanes continued to work on the physiology of invertebrates at University College London under William Sharpey and Burdon-Sanderson. In 1879, at 31, Romanes was elected a Fellow of the Royal Society on the basis of his work on the nervous systems of medusae. However, Romanes' tendency to support his claims by anecdotal evidence rather than empirical tests prompted Lloyd Morgan's warning known as Morgan's Canon:

"In no case is an animal activity to be interpreted in terms of higher psychological processes, if it can be fairly interpreted in terms of processes which stand lower in the scale of psychological evolution and development".

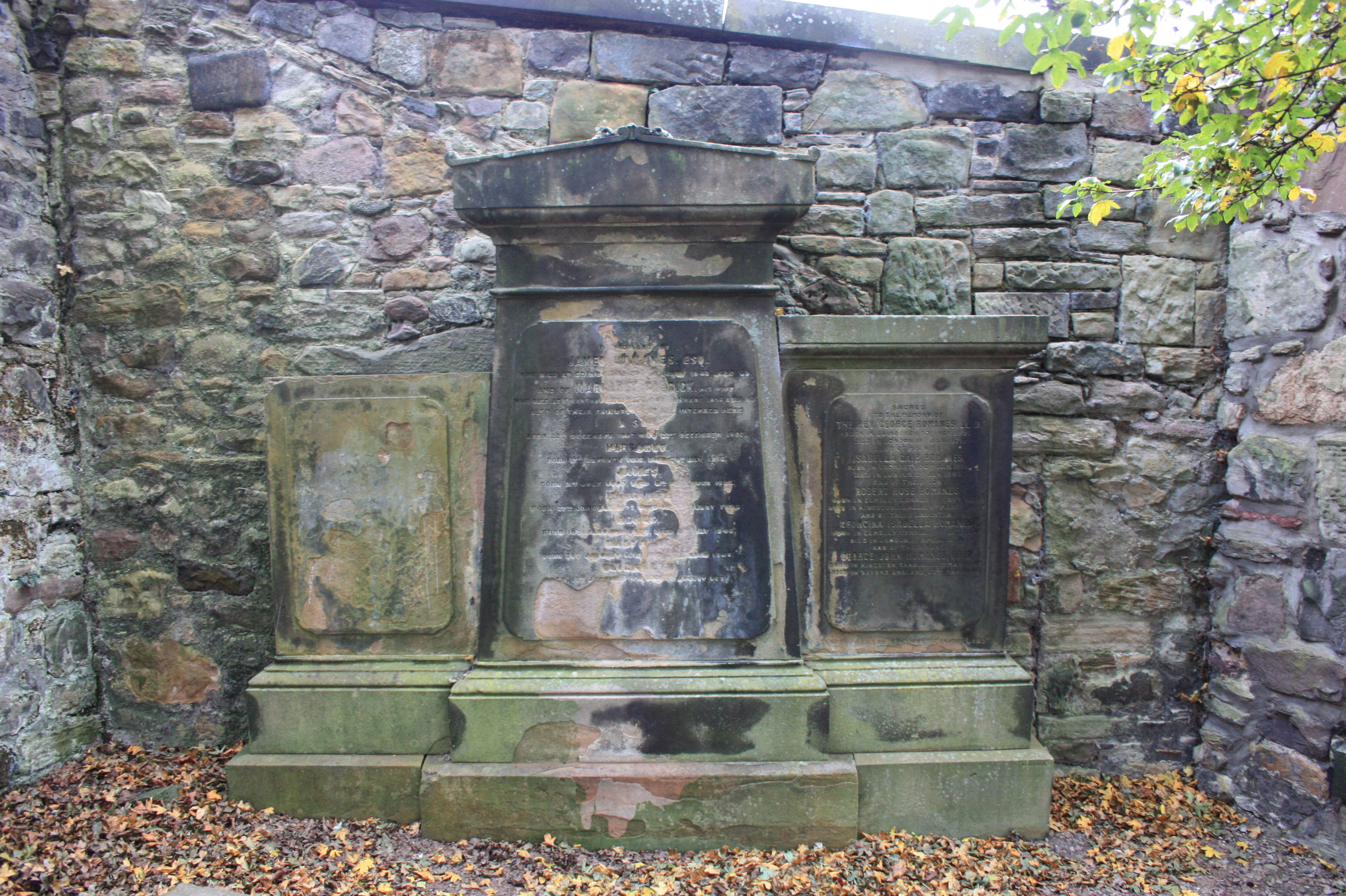
The Romanes grave, Greyfriars Kirkyard in Edinburgh

As a young man, Romanes was a Christian, and some, including his religious wife, later said that he regained some of that belief during his final illness. In fact, he became an agnostic due to the influence of Darwin. In a manuscript left unfinished at the end of his life, he said that the theory of evolution had caused him to abandon religion.

Romanes founded a series of free public lectures, the Romanes Lectures, which continue to this day. He was a friend of Thomas Henry Huxley, who gave the second Romanes lecture.

Towards the end of his life, he returned to Christianity.

He died in Oxford on 23 May 1894. A memorial to Romanes exists in the north-west corner of Greyfriars Kirkyard in Edinburgh on the grave of his parents.

== Professional life ==
Romanes's and Darwin's relationship developed quickly, and they became close friends. This relationship began when Romanes became Darwin's research assistant during the last eight years of Darwin's life. The association Romanes had with Darwin was essential in Darwin's later works. Therefore, Darwin confided volumes of unpublished work which Romanes later used to publish papers. Like Darwin, Romanes's theories were met with scepticism and were not accepted initially. The majority of Romanes's work attempted to make a connection between animal consciousness and human consciousness. Some problems were encountered during his research that he addressed with the development of physiological selection. This was Romanes's answer to three objections to Darwin's isolation theory of speciation. These were: species characteristics that have no evolutionary purpose; the widespread fact of inter-specific sterility; and the need for varieties to escape the swamping effects of inter-crossing after permanent species are established. At the end of his career, the majority of his work was directed towards the development of a relationship between intelligence and placement on an evolutionary tree. Romanes believed that the further along an organism was on an evolutionary standpoint, the more likely that organism would be to possess a higher level of functioning.

== Family ==
Romanes was the last child born of three children from George Romanes and Isabella Cair Smith. The majority of his immediate and extended family were descendants of Scottish Highland tribes. His father, Reverend George Romanes, was a professor at Queens College in Kingston, Canada and taught Greek at the local university until the family moved back to England. Romanes and his wife Ethel Duncan were married on 11 February 1879. They were happily married and studied together. Romanes was said to be an "ideal father" to their six children. Both Romanes' mother and father were involved in the Protestant and Anglican Church during his childhood. Romanes was baptised Anglican and was heavily involved with Anglican teachings during his youth, despite the fact that his parents were not heavily involved with any religion.

It is speculated that Darwin may have been viewed as a father figure to Romanes. Darwin did not agree with the teachings of the Catholic Church because the fundamental teachings were not supported by his scientific findings at the time. This could explain Romanes' conversion to agnosticism.

== Philosophical and political views ==
When Romanes attended Gonville and Caius College Cambridge, he entered into an essay contest on the topic of "Christian Prayer considered in relation to the belief that Almighty governs the world by general laws". Romanes did not have much hope in winning, but much to his surprise he took first place in this contest and received the Burney prize. After winning the Burney prize, Romanes came to the conclusion that – even though his father had been a Reverend – he could no longer be faithful to his Christian religion due to his love and commitment to science. Therefore, Romanes went into great detail about religion and how all aspects of the mind need to be involved to be faithfully committed to religion in his book Thoughts on Religion. He believed that one had to have an extremely high level of will to be dedicated to God or Christ. He had earlier published a book on the subject in general called A Candid Examination of Theism, where he concluded that God's existence was not supported by the evidence, but stated his unhappiness with the fact.

== Romanes on evolution ==
Romanes tackled the subject of evolution frequently. For the most part, he supported Darwinism and the role of natural selection. However, he perceived three problems with Darwinian evolution:

1. The difference between natural species and domesticated varieties in respect to fertility. [This problem was especially pertinent to Darwin, who used the analogy of change in domesticated animals so frequently]
2. Structures which serve to distinguish allied species are often without any known utilitarian significance. [taxonomists choose the most visible and least changeable features to identify a species, but there may be a host of other differences which, though not useful to the taxonomist, are significant in survival terms]
3. The swamping influence upon an incipient species-split of free inter-crossing. [Here we strike the problem which most perplexed Darwin, with his ideas of blending inheritance. It was solved by the rediscovery of Mendelian genetics, and the modern synthesis which showed that particulate inheritance could underlie continuous variation. Romanes also made the acute point that Darwin had not actually shown how natural selection produced species, despite the title of his famous book (On the Origin of Species by Means of Natural Selection). Natural selection could be the 'machine' for producing adaptation, but still in question was the mechanism for splitting species.

Romanes' own solution to this was called 'physiological selection'. His idea was that variation in reproductive ability, caused mainly by the prevention of intercrossing with parental forms, was the primary driving force in the production of new species. The majority view then (and now) was that geographical separation is the primary force in species splitting (or allopatry) and secondarily was the increased sterility of crosses between incipient species.

Taking influence from Darwin, Romanes was a proponent of both natural selection and the inheritance of acquired characteristics. The latter was denied by Alfred Russel Wallace, a strict selectionist. Romanes came into a dispute with Wallace over the definition of Darwinism.

== Published works ==
When Charles Darwin died, Romanes defended Darwin's theories by attempting to rebut criticisms and attacks levied by other psychologists against the Darwinian school of thought. Romanes expanded on Darwin's theories of evolution and natural selection by advancing a theory of behaviour based on comparative psychology. In Animal Intelligence, Romanes demonstrated similarities and dissimilarities between cognitive and physical functions of various animals. In Mental Evolution in Animals, Romanes illustrated the evolution of the cognitive and physical functions associated with animal life. Romanes believed that animal intelligence evolves through behavioural conditioning, or positive reinforcement. Romanes then published Mental Evolution in Man, which focused on the evolution of human cognitive and physical functions.

In 1890, Romanes published Darwin, and After Darwin, where he attempted to explain the relationship between science and religion. All of his notes on this subject were left to Charles Gore. Gore used the notes in preparing Thoughts on Religion, and published the work under Romanes' name. The Life and Letters of George Romanes offers a semi-autobiographical account of Romanes's life.

== Accomplishments ==
- 1879: Romanes was selected for the Fellow of the Royal Society.
- 1886–1890: Romanes was a professor at University of Edinburgh.
- 1892: When he was a professor at the University of Oxford, Romanes created a series of lectures known as Romanes Lectures.
  - These lectures are currently still held once a year in memory of Romanes.
- Romanes is also known for creating the following words and meanings:
  - Anthropomorphism: attributing human-like qualities to other animals.
  - Anecdotal method: the use of observational methods to collect data on animal behaviour.
- He developed the stepping stairs for cognitive development.

== Publications ==
- The Scientific Evidences of Organic Evolution, Macmillan and Co., 1882 [1st Pub. 1877].
- Candid Examination of Theism, Trübner & Co., 1878 [pseudonymously published as Physicus].
- Animal Intelligence, D. Appleton and Company, 1892 [1st Pub. 1882].
- Mental Evolution in Animals, with a Posthumous Essay on Instinct by Charles Darwin, Kegan Paul, Trench & Co., 1883.
- Jelly-Fish, Star-Fish and Sea Urchins, Being a Research on Primitive Nervous Systems, K. Paul, Trench & Co., 1885.
- Physiological Selection: an Additional Suggestion on the Origin of Species, The Journal of the Linnean Society, Vol. 19, 1886.
- Mental Evolution in Man, Kegan Paul, Trench & Co., 1888.
- Darwin, and after Darwin, (1892–97, a work of significance for historians of evolution theory):
  - The Darwinian Theory, The Open Court Publishing Company, 1910 [1st Pub. 1892].
  - Post-Darwinian Questions: Heredity and Utility, The Open Court Publishing Company, 1906 [1st Pub. 1895].
  - Post-Darwinian Questions: Isolation and Physiological Selection, The Open Court Publishing Company, 1914 [1st Pub. 1897].
- Mind and Motion and Monism, Longmans, Green, and Co., 1895.
- An Examination of Weismannism, The Open Court Publishing company, 1893 (August Weismann was the leading evolutionary theoretician at the turn of the 19th century).
- Thoughts on Religion, Longmans, Green & Co., 1895.
- Essays, Longmans, Green & Co., 1897.

=== Articles ===
- "Christian Prayer and General Laws: Being the Burney Prize Essay for the Year 1873," Macmillan & Co., 1874.
- "Fetichism in Animals," Nature, 27 December 1877.
- "Recreation," The Nineteenth Century, Vol. VI, July/December 1879.
- "Suicide," Nature, December 1881.
- "American Ants," Nature, 2 March 1882.
- "Nature and Thought," The Contemporary Review, Vol. XLIII, June 1883.
- "Man and Brute," The North American Review, Vol. 139, No. 333, Aug. 1884.
- "Mind in Men and Animals," The North American Review, March 1885.
- "Physiological Selection," The Nineteenth Century, Vol. XXI, January/June 1887.
- "Mental Differences Between Men and Women," The Nineteenth Century, Vol. XXI, January/June 1887.
- "Concerning Women," The Forum, Vol. IV, 1887.
- "Recent Critics of Darwinism," The Contemporary Review, Vol. LIII, January/June 1888.
- "Mr. Wallace on Darwinism," The Contemporary Review, Vol. LVI, July/December 1889.
- "Weismann's Theory of Heredity," The Contemporary Review, Vol. LVII, January/June 1890.
- "Mr. A. R. Wallace on Physiological Selection," The Monist, Vol. I, N°. 1, October 1890.
- "Origin of Human Faculty," Brain; a Journal of Neurology, Vol. XII, 1890.
- "The Psychic Life of Micro-Organisms," The Open Court, Vol. IV, 1890–1891.
- "Aristotle as a Naturalist," The Contemporary Review, Vol. LIX, January/June 1891.
- "Thought and Language," Part II, The Monist, Vol. 2, No. 1, October 1891; No. 3, April 1892.
- "Critical Remarks on Weismannism," The Open Court, Vol. VII, N°. 313, August 1893.
- "Weismann and Galton," The Open Court, Vol. VII, N°. 315, September 1893.
- "A Note on Panmixia," The Contemporary Review, Vol. LXIV, July/December 1893.
- "Longevity and Death," The Monist, Vol. V, N°. 2, January 1895.
- "The Darwinism of Darwin, and of the Post-Darwinian Schools," The Monist, Vol. VI, N°. 1, October 1895.
- "Isolation in Organic Evolution," The Monist, Vol. VIII, 1898.

=== Miscellany ===
- Observations on the Locomotor System of Echinodermata, Philosophical Transactions of the Royal Society of London, Vol. 172, Part III, 1882.
- Darwinism Illustrated: Wood-engravings Explanatory of the Theory of Evolution, The Open Court Publishing Company, 1892.
- A Selection from the Poems of George John Romanes, Longmans, Green & Co., 1896.

Academic offices
Preceded by Arthur Gamgee	Fullerian Professor of Physiology; 1888–1891	Succeeded by Victor Horsley
