= Ethel Romanes =

English writer and religious activist (1856–1927)

- Born: Ethel Duncan; 15 August 1856; Wavertree, Liverpool, Lancashire, England
- Died: 30 March 1927 (aged 70); Santa Margherita, Italy
- Occupations: Writer, religious activist
- Spouse: George John Romanes (m. 1879; died 1894)
- Children: 6

Ethel Romanes (née Duncan; 15 August 1856 – 30 March 1927) was an English writer and religious activist.

== Biography ==
Romanes was born in Wavertree, Liverpool in 1856. Her parents were Gertrude (born Radcliffe) and Andrew Duncan. Her father was a merchant. Her cousin was James Malcolm, who was the 8th of the Malcolm baronets (and her guardian) when she met George John Romanes, who was a disciple of Charles Darwin at his house. They were wed on 11 February 1879 and had a happy marriage and studied together. Romanes was said to be an "ideal father" to their six children. They holidayed at "Geanies" in Scotland in a rented home and for the rest of the year they lived in London.

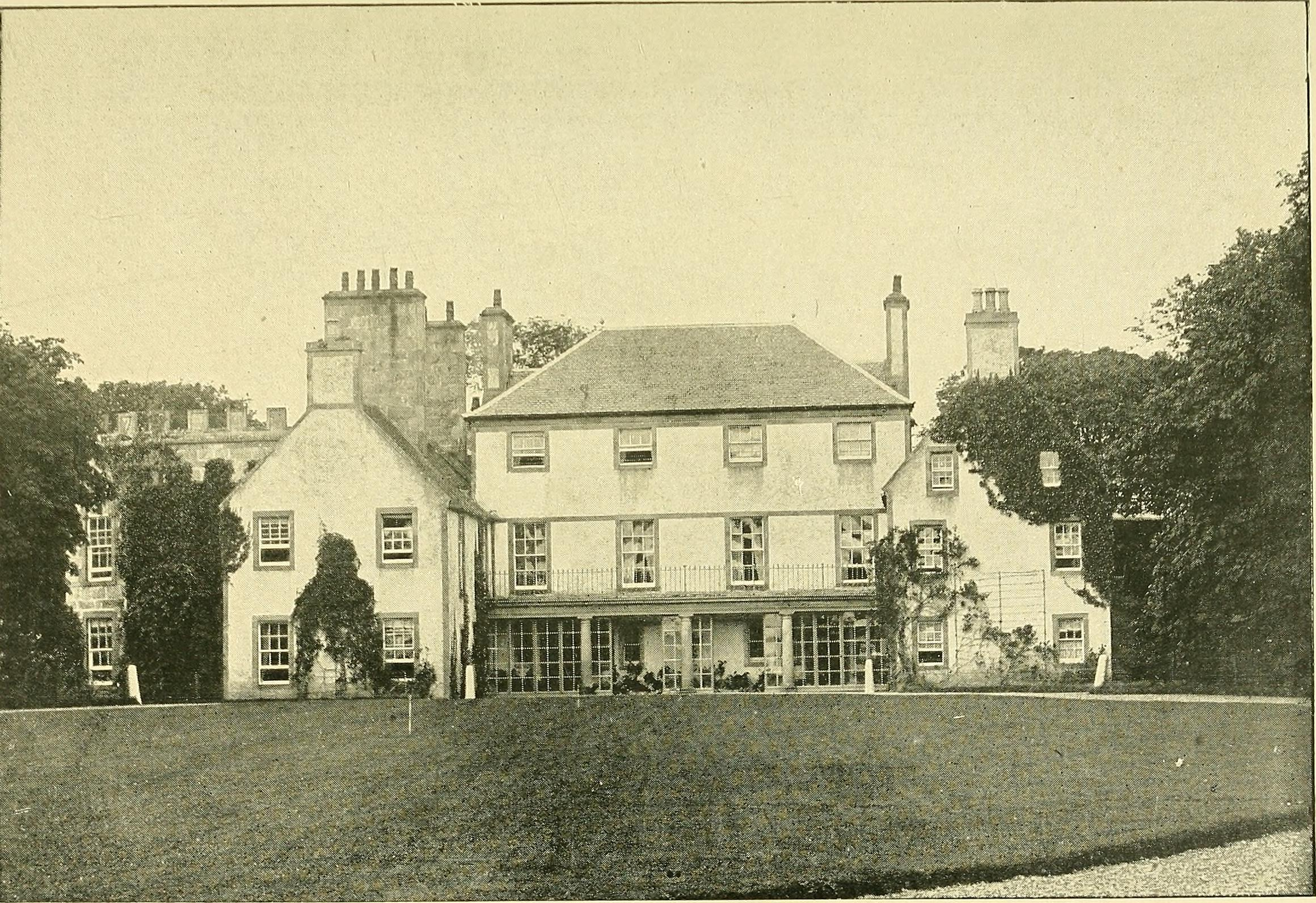
"Geanies" - their holiday home

They had six children, five boys and a girl. Ethel was involved in education, serving on the committee of the Froebel Society. She noted later that Claude Montefiore was the only person who smiled on the council. Their daughter was educated at Wycombe Abbey School and Lady Margaret Hall, Oxford.

Her husband's parents were involved in the Protestant and Anglican Church during his childhood. He was baptised Anglican and was heavily involved with the Anglican teachings during his youth. He converted as an adult to agnosticism.

After a distinguished career including writing the Mental Evolution in Man, which focused on the evolution of human cognitive and physical functions, her husband died in 1894. He had been a loyal disciple of Darwin, and Ethel had borrowed some of his books to read too. Two years later she published The Life and Letters of George John Romanes. She left out some notable letters from J. T. Gulick and one source believes this was due to the discussions she had with her husband about his lack of religious belief. It is thought that she wanted to give the impression that he had regained his faith. Her husband appears to have remained an agnostic, but others note that he did not enjoy this position and some of his final poems show a respect for his wife's beliefs. She was interested in religion and in 1902 she published Thoughts on the Penitential Psalms and the following year Meditations on the Epistle of S. James. Another religious book, Thoughts on the Beatitudes followed in 1910.

Romanes died in Santa Margherita in Italy in 1927.
