= Hyaleucerea =

Scientific classification
- Domain: Eukaryota
- Kingdom: Animalia
- Phylum: Arthropoda
- Class: Insecta
- Order: Lepidoptera
- Superfamily: Noctuoidea
- Family: Erebidae
- Subfamily: Arctiinae
- Subtribe: Euchromiina
- Genus: Hyaleucerea; Butler, 1875

Genus of moths

Hyaleucerea is a genus of moths in the subfamily Arctiinae. The genus was erected by Arthur Gardiner Butler in 1875.

== Species ==
- Hyaleucerea chapmani Klages, 1906
- Hyaleucerea costinotatum (Dognin, 1900)
- Hyaleucerea erythrotelus (Walker, 1854)
- Hyaleucerea fusiformis (Walker, 1856)
- Hyaleucerea gigantea (Druce, 1884)
- Hyaleucerea grandis Schaus, 1921
- Hyaleucerea lemoulti (Schaus, 1905)
- Hyaleucerea leucoprocta Dognin, 1909
- Hyaleucerea leucosticta Druce, 1905
- Hyaleucerea lugubris Schaus, 1901
- Hyaleucerea manicorensis Rego Barros, 1971
- Hyaleucerea mundula (Berg, 1882)
- Hyaleucerea ockendeni Rothschild, 1912
- Hyaleucerea panacea (Druce, 1884)
- Hyaleucerea phaeosoma Hampson, 1905
- Hyaleucerea sororia Schaus, 1910
- Hyaleucerea trifasciata (Butler, 1877)
- Hyaleucerea uniformis Rothschild, 1912

== Former species ==
- Hyaleucerea agylloides Dyar, 1912
- Hyaleucerea luctuosa Möschler, 1877
- Hyaleucerea picticeps Hampson, 1903
- Hyaleucerea vulnerata Butler, 1875
