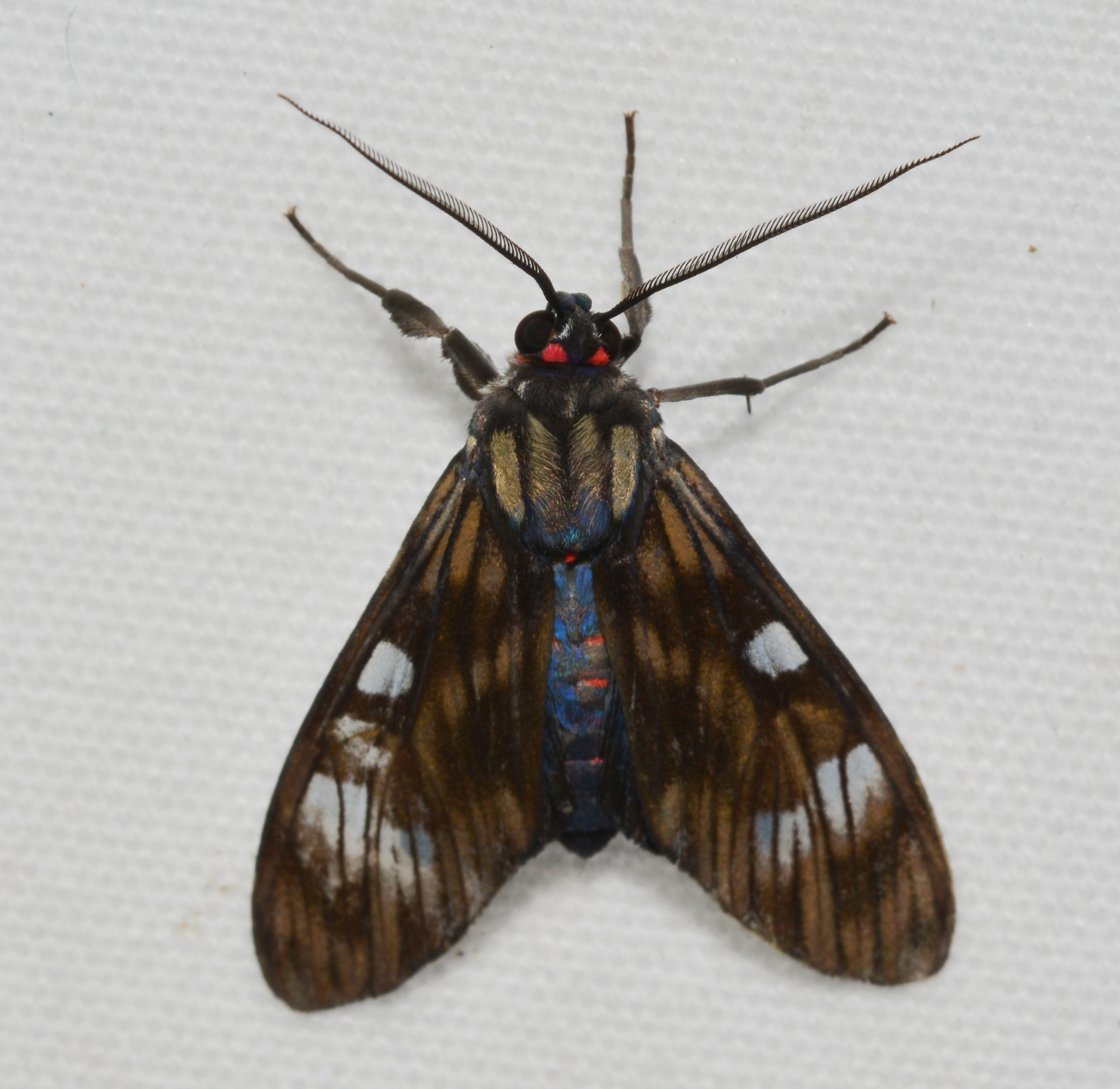

Scientific classification
- Domain: Eukaryota
- Kingdom: Animalia
- Phylum: Arthropoda
- Class: Insecta
- Order: Lepidoptera
- Superfamily: Noctuoidea
- Family: Erebidae
- Subfamily: Arctiinae
- Genus: Episcepsis
- Species: E. demonis

Binomial name
- Episcepsis demonis (H. Druce, 1896)

Synonyms
- Eucereon demonis H. Druce, 1896; Epidesma demonis

= Episcepsis demonis =

Species of moth

Episcepsis demonis is a moth of the family Erebidae. It was described by Herbert Druce in 1896. It is found in Panama and Peru.

== Description ==
Head, thorax, and abdomen black brown; back of head with two crimson spots; abdomen with dorsal crimson spot on 1st segment, and lateral spots on 4th segment. Forewing greyish black-brown; an obscure, oblique, subbasal black band, and curved antemedial band; a subquadrate hyaline (glass-like) spot in end of cell; a blackish discoidal bar; an ill-defined postmedial blackish band excurved between veins 5 and 3, then bent inwards to below angle of cell, and with a curved hyaline band beyond it from vein 8, narrowing to vein 3, and with a curved dark patch beyond it from costa to vein 5; terminal dark patches at apex and below vein 5. Hindwing hyaline, the veins black; a terminal bluish-black band expanding widely towards apex and tornus. Its wingspan is 44 mm.
