= Pseudohyaleucerea =

Scientific classification
- Kingdom: Animalia
- Phylum: Arthropoda
- Class: Insecta
- Order: Lepidoptera
- Superfamily: Noctuoidea
- Family: Erebidae
- Subfamily: Arctiinae
- Tribe: Arctiini
- Subtribe: Euchromiina
- Genus: Pseudohyaleucerea; Régo Barros & Machado, 1971

Genus of moths

Pseudohyaleucerea is a genus of moths in the subfamily Arctiinae. The genus was described by Régo Barros and Machado in 1971.

== Species ==
- Pseudohyaleucerea bartschi (Schaus, 1928)
- Pseudohyaleucerea melanthoides (Schaus, 1920)
- Pseudohyaleucerea nigrozonum (Schaus, 1905)
- Pseudohyaleucerea vulnerata (Butler, 1875)
