= Episcepsis gnomoides =

Scientific classification
- Kingdom: Animalia
- Phylum: Arthropoda
- Class: Insecta
- Order: Lepidoptera
- Superfamily: Noctuoidea
- Family: Erebidae
- Subfamily: Arctiinae
- Genus: Episcepsis
- Species: E. gnomoides

Binomial name
- Episcepsis gnomoides Schaus, 1910

Synonyms
- Epidesma gnomoides

Species of moth

Episcepsis gnomoides is a moth of the family Erebidae. It was described by William Schaus in 1910. It is found in Costa Rica.

== Description ==
Head and thorax greyish brown; palpi white in front; the upper part of frons with pair of white points, the back of head with pair of crimson spots; fore coxae white; abdomen black with lateral metallic blue patches and the terminal half with blue bands, the ventral surface with the three basal segments white. Forewing grey brown, the veins blackish. Hindwing blackish with some semihyaline (almost glass like) in, below, and just beyond the cell.

Its wingspan is 34 mm.
