= Heliura sanguipalpia =

Scientific classification
- Kingdom: Animalia
- Phylum: Arthropoda
- Clade: Pancrustacea
- Class: Insecta
- Order: Lepidoptera
- Superfamily: Noctuoidea
- Family: Erebidae
- Subfamily: Arctiinae
- Genus: Heliura
- Species: H. sanguipalpia

Binomial name
- Heliura sanguipalpia Hampson, 1898

Species of moth

Heliura sanguipalpia is a moth of the subfamily Arctiinae. It was described by George Hampson in 1898. It is found in Santa Catarina, Brazil.
