= Hyaleucerea panacea =

Scientific classification
- Domain: Eukaryota
- Kingdom: Animalia
- Phylum: Arthropoda
- Class: Insecta
- Order: Lepidoptera
- Superfamily: Noctuoidea
- Family: Erebidae
- Subfamily: Arctiinae
- Genus: Hyaleucerea
- Species: H. panacea

Binomial name
- Hyaleucerea panacea (Druce, 1884)

Synonyms
- Antichloris panacea Druce, 1884

Species of moth

Hyaleucerea panacea is a moth of the subfamily Arctiinae. It was described by Druce in 1884. It is found in Costa Rica.
