= Heliura flavopunctata =

Scientific classification
- Kingdom: Animalia
- Phylum: Arthropoda
- Clade: Pancrustacea
- Class: Insecta
- Order: Lepidoptera
- Superfamily: Noctuoidea
- Family: Erebidae
- Subfamily: Arctiinae
- Genus: Heliura
- Species: H. flavopunctata

Binomial name
- Heliura flavopunctata Dognin, 1911

Species of moth

Heliura flavopunctata is a moth of the subfamily Arctiinae. It was described by Paul Dognin in 1911. It is found in Colombia.
