= Pseudohyaleucerea melanthoides =

Scientific classification
- Kingdom: Animalia
- Phylum: Arthropoda
- Class: Insecta
- Order: Lepidoptera
- Superfamily: Noctuoidea
- Family: Erebidae
- Subfamily: Arctiinae
- Genus: Pseudohyaleucerea
- Species: P. melanthoides

Binomial name
- Pseudohyaleucerea melanthoides (Schaus, 1920)

Synonyms
- Pseudomya melanthoides Schaus, 1920

Species of moth

Pseudohyaleucerea melanthoides is a moth in the subfamily Arctiinae. It was described by Schaus in 1920. It is found in Costa Rica, Guatemala and Honduras.
