= Episcepsis melanota =

Scientific classification
- Kingdom: Animalia
- Phylum: Arthropoda
- Class: Insecta
- Order: Lepidoptera
- Superfamily: Noctuoidea
- Family: Erebidae
- Subfamily: Arctiinae
- Genus: Episcepsis
- Species: E. melanota

Binomial name
- Episcepsis melanota (Hampson, 1909)

Synonyms
- Methysia melanota Hampson, 1909; Epidesma melanota; Saurita melanota

Species of moth

Episcepsis melanota is a moth of the family Erebidae. It was described by George Hampson in 1909. It is found in Guyana.
