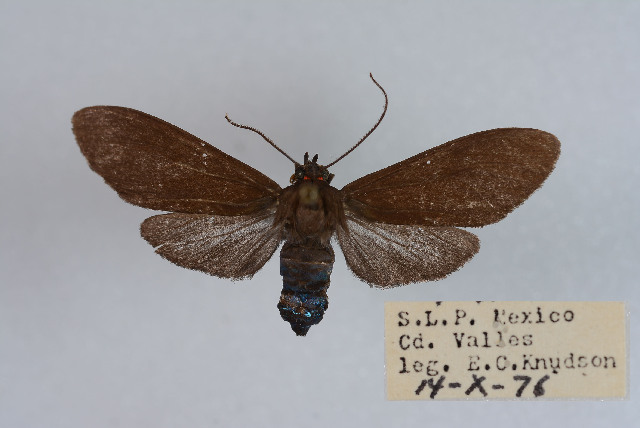

Scientific classification
- Kingdom: Animalia
- Phylum: Arthropoda
- Class: Insecta
- Order: Lepidoptera
- Superfamily: Noctuoidea
- Family: Erebidae
- Subfamily: Arctiinae
- Genus: Episcepsis
- Species: E. inornata

Binomial name
- Episcepsis inornata (Walker, 1856)

Synonyms
- Automolis inornata Walker, 1856; Epidesma inornata; Epidesma dodaba Dyar, 1910; Epidesma flavomaculata Draudt, 1915; Episcepcis inornata Hernández-Baz, 2013

= Episcepsis inornata =

Species of moth

Episcepsis inornata is a moth of the family Erebidae. It was described by Francis Walker in 1856. It lives in Central America (including Guatemala and Costa Rica). It has also been seen in southern Texas.

The wingspan is about 37 mm.
