= Heliura mimula =

Scientific classification
- Kingdom: Animalia
- Phylum: Arthropoda
- Clade: Pancrustacea
- Class: Insecta
- Order: Lepidoptera
- Superfamily: Noctuoidea
- Family: Erebidae
- Subfamily: Arctiinae
- Genus: Heliura
- Species: H. mimula

Binomial name
- Heliura mimula (Draudt, 1917)

Synonyms
- Agyrta mimula Draudt, 1917

Species of moth

Heliura mimula is a moth of the subfamily Arctiinae. It was described by Max Wilhelm Karl Draudt in 1917. It is found in French Guiana.
