= Heliura tetragramma =

Scientific classification
- Kingdom: Animalia
- Phylum: Arthropoda
- Clade: Pancrustacea
- Class: Insecta
- Order: Lepidoptera
- Superfamily: Noctuoidea
- Family: Erebidae
- Subfamily: Arctiinae
- Genus: Heliura
- Species: H. tetragramma

Binomial name
- Heliura tetragramma (Walker, 1854)

Synonyms
- Euchromia tetragramma Walker, 1854

Species of moth

Heliura tetragramma is a moth of the subfamily Arctiinae. It was described by Francis Walker in 1854. It is found in Costa Rica, Honduras and Pará, Brazil.
