= Episcepsis dominicensis =

Scientific classification
- Domain: Eukaryota
- Kingdom: Animalia
- Phylum: Arthropoda
- Class: Insecta
- Order: Lepidoptera
- Superfamily: Noctuoidea
- Family: Erebidae
- Subfamily: Arctiinae
- Genus: Episcepsis
- Species: E. dominicensis

Binomial name
- Episcepsis dominicensis Rothschild, 1911

Synonyms
- Epidesma dominicensis

Species of moth

Episcepsis dominicensis is a moth of the family Erebidae. It was described by Walter Rothschild in 1911. It is found on Dominica.
