= Heliura excavata =

Scientific classification
- Kingdom: Animalia
- Phylum: Arthropoda
- Clade: Pancrustacea
- Class: Insecta
- Order: Lepidoptera
- Superfamily: Noctuoidea
- Family: Erebidae
- Subfamily: Arctiinae
- Genus: Heliura
- Species: H. excavata

Binomial name
- Heliura excavata Dognin, 1910

Synonyms
- Heliura excavata ab. flava Dognin, 1910

Species of moth

Heliura excavata is a moth of the subfamily Arctiinae. It was described by Paul Dognin in 1910. It is found in French Guiana.
