= Episcepsis lenaeus =

Scientific classification
- Domain: Eukaryota
- Kingdom: Animalia
- Phylum: Arthropoda
- Class: Insecta
- Order: Lepidoptera
- Superfamily: Noctuoidea
- Family: Erebidae
- Subfamily: Arctiinae
- Genus: Episcepsis
- Species: E. lenaeus

Binomial name
- Episcepsis lenaeus (Cramer, 1780)

Synonyms
- Sphinx lenaeus Cramer, [1779]; Epidesma lenaeus; Episcepcis lenaeus Hernández-Baz, 2013

Species of moth

Episcepsis lenaeus is a moth of the family Erebidae. It was described by Pieter Cramer in 1780. It is found from Mexico to the Guianas.

== Description ==
Head and thorax fuscous brown; back of head and shoulders with paired crimson spots; fore coxae crimson; abdomen metallic blue, the dorsal patch of hair brown; the ventral surface fuscous, with white patches on the first three segments. Forewing fuscous brown, with apical white patch. Hindwing fuscous with a slight bluish tinge; some hyaline in, below, and beyond cell; the tuft on inner area white. (Female) Abdomen without white patches below. Wingspan 36 mm.
