= Hyaleucerea grandis =

Scientific classification
- Domain: Eukaryota
- Kingdom: Animalia
- Phylum: Arthropoda
- Class: Insecta
- Order: Lepidoptera
- Superfamily: Noctuoidea
- Family: Erebidae
- Subfamily: Arctiinae
- Genus: Hyaleucerea
- Species: H. grandis

Binomial name
- Hyaleucerea grandis Schaus, 1921

Species of moth

Hyaleucerea grandis is a moth of the subfamily Arctiinae. It was described by William Schaus in 1921. It is found in Ecuador.
