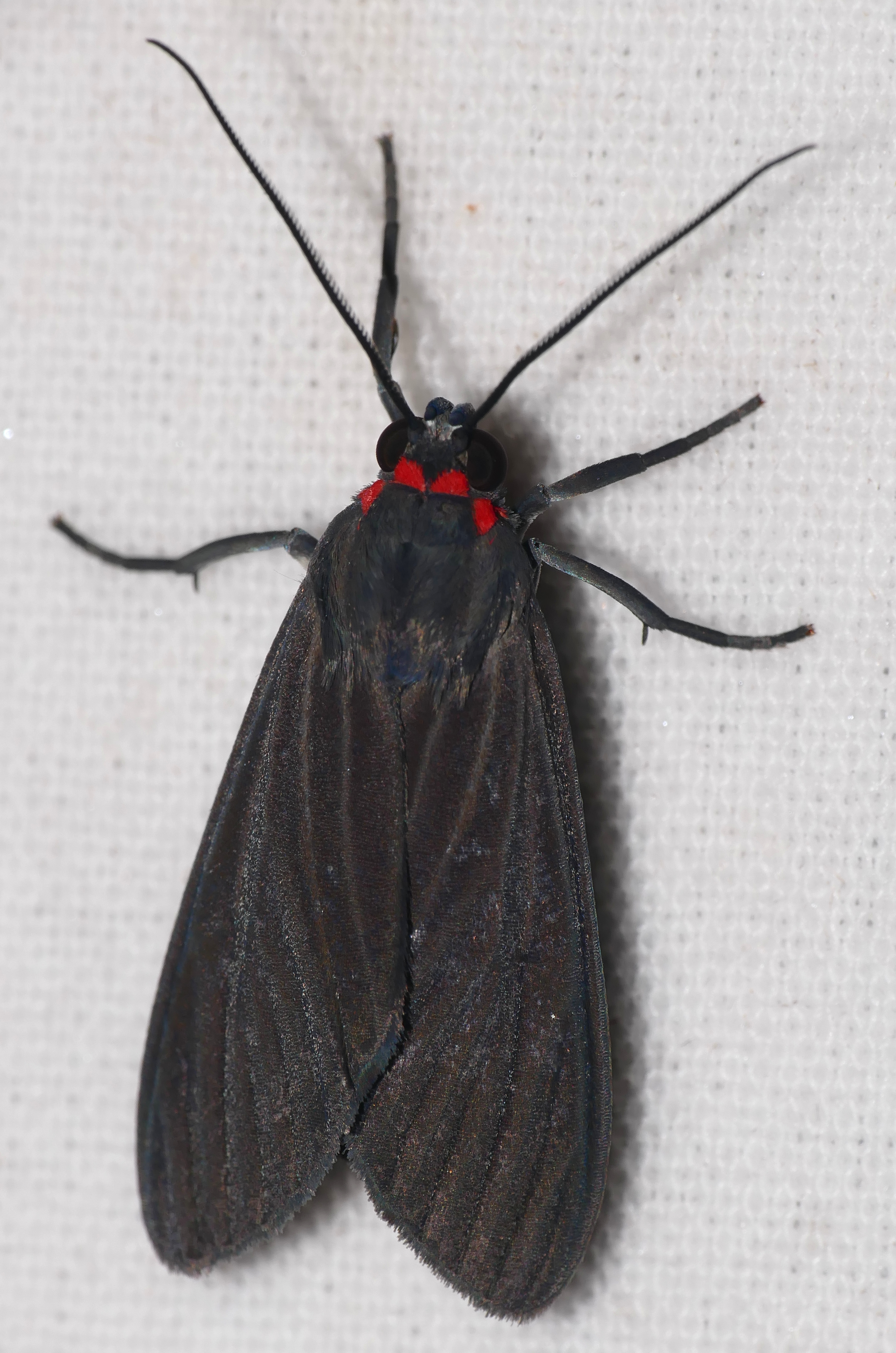

Scientific classification
- Domain: Eukaryota
- Kingdom: Animalia
- Phylum: Arthropoda
- Class: Insecta
- Order: Lepidoptera
- Superfamily: Noctuoidea
- Family: Erebidae
- Subfamily: Arctiinae
- Genus: Episcepsis
- Species: E. gnoma

Binomial name
- Episcepsis gnoma (Butler, 1877)

Synonyms
- Heliura gnoma Butler, 1877; Epidesma gnoma

= Episcepsis gnoma =

Species of moth

Episcepsis gnoma is a moth of the family Erebidae. It was described by Arthur Gardiner Butler in 1877. It is found in the Brazilian states of Amazonas and Rio de Janeiro.
