= Heliura elongata =

Scientific classification
- Kingdom: Animalia
- Phylum: Arthropoda
- Clade: Pancrustacea
- Class: Insecta
- Order: Lepidoptera
- Superfamily: Noctuoidea
- Family: Erebidae
- Subfamily: Arctiinae
- Genus: Heliura
- Species: H. elongata

Binomial name
- Heliura elongata Rothschild, 1912

Synonyms
- Heliura elongata ab. auranticaput Strand, 1920

Species of moth

Heliura elongata is a moth of the subfamily Arctiinae. It was described by Rothschild in 1912. It is found in Venezuela.
