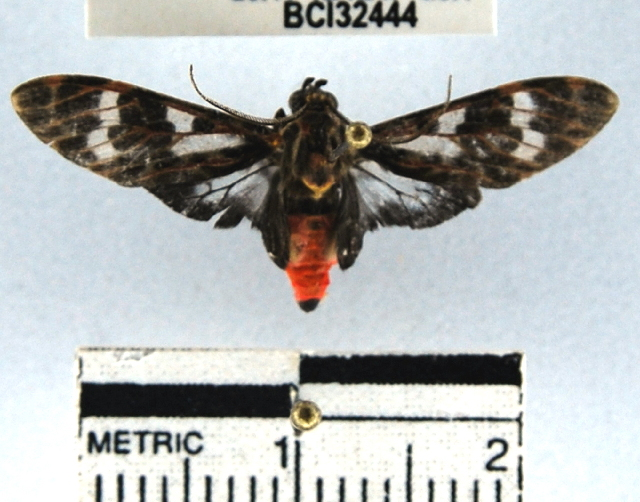

Scientific classification
- Kingdom: Animalia
- Phylum: Arthropoda
- Clade: Pancrustacea
- Class: Insecta
- Order: Lepidoptera
- Superfamily: Noctuoidea
- Family: Erebidae
- Subfamily: Arctiinae
- Genus: Heliura
- Species: H. rhodophila

Binomial name
- Heliura rhodophila (Walker, 1856)

Synonyms
- Eucerea rhodophila Walker, 1856; Heliura pyrrhosoma Butler, 1876; Heliura solicauda Butler, 1876

= Heliura rhodophila =

Species of moth

Heliura rhodophila is a moth of the subfamily Arctiinae. It was described by Francis Walker in 1856. It is found in Honduras, Costa Rica and Pará, Brazil.
