= Heliura gigantea =

Scientific classification
- Kingdom: Animalia
- Phylum: Arthropoda
- Clade: Pancrustacea
- Class: Insecta
- Order: Lepidoptera
- Superfamily: Noctuoidea
- Family: Erebidae
- Subfamily: Arctiinae
- Genus: Heliura
- Species: H. gigantea

Binomial name
- Heliura gigantea H. Druce, 1900

Species of moth

Heliura gigantea is a moth of the subfamily Arctiinae. It was described by Herbert Druce in 1900. It is found in Colombia.
