= Episcepsis melanoneura =

Scientific classification
- Domain: Eukaryota
- Kingdom: Animalia
- Phylum: Arthropoda
- Class: Insecta
- Order: Lepidoptera
- Superfamily: Noctuoidea
- Family: Erebidae
- Subfamily: Arctiinae
- Genus: Episcepsis
- Species: E. melanoneura

Binomial name
- Episcepsis melanoneura Zerny, 1931

Synonyms
- Epidesma melanoneura

Species of moth

Episcepsis melanoneura is a moth of the family Erebidae. It was described by Hans Zerny in 1931. It is found in Brazil.
