= Hyaleucerea phaeosoma =

Scientific classification
- Kingdom: Animalia
- Phylum: Arthropoda
- Class: Insecta
- Order: Lepidoptera
- Superfamily: Noctuoidea
- Family: Erebidae
- Subfamily: Arctiinae
- Genus: Hyaleucerea
- Species: H. phaeosoma

Binomial name
- Hyaleucerea phaeosoma Hampson, 1905

Synonyms
- Hyaleucerea minuta Rothschild, 1912

Species of moth

Hyaleucerea phaeosoma is a moth of the subfamily Arctiinae. It was described by George Hampson in 1905. It is found in Paraguay.
