= Hyaleucerea chapmani =

Scientific classification
- Domain: Eukaryota
- Kingdom: Animalia
- Phylum: Arthropoda
- Class: Insecta
- Order: Lepidoptera
- Superfamily: Noctuoidea
- Family: Erebidae
- Subfamily: Arctiinae
- Genus: Hyaleucerea
- Species: H. chapmani

Binomial name
- Hyaleucerea chapmani Klages, 1906

Species of moth

Hyaleucerea chapmani is a moth of the subfamily Arctiinae. It was described by Edward A. Klages in 1906. It is found in Venezuela.
