= Episcepsis pseudothetis =

Scientific classification
- Domain: Eukaryota
- Kingdom: Animalia
- Phylum: Arthropoda
- Class: Insecta
- Order: Lepidoptera
- Superfamily: Noctuoidea
- Family: Erebidae
- Subfamily: Arctiinae
- Genus: Episcepsis
- Species: E. pseudothetis

Binomial name
- Episcepsis pseudothetis Fleming, 1959

Synonyms
- Epidesma pseudothetis

Species of moth

Episcepsis pseudothetis is a moth of the family Erebidae. It was described by Henry Fleming in 1959. It is found in Trinidad.
