= Heliura hagmanni =

Scientific classification
- Kingdom: Animalia
- Phylum: Arthropoda
- Clade: Pancrustacea
- Class: Insecta
- Order: Lepidoptera
- Superfamily: Noctuoidea
- Family: Erebidae
- Subfamily: Arctiinae
- Genus: Heliura
- Species: H. hagmanni

Binomial name
- Heliura hagmanni Zerny, 1931

Species of moth

Heliura hagmanni is a moth of the subfamily Arctiinae. It was described by Zerny in 1931. It is found in Brazil.
