= Episcepsis moloneyi =

Scientific classification
- Domain: Eukaryota
- Kingdom: Animalia
- Phylum: Arthropoda
- Class: Insecta
- Order: Lepidoptera
- Superfamily: Noctuoidea
- Family: Erebidae
- Subfamily: Arctiinae
- Genus: Episcepsis
- Species: E. moloneyi

Binomial name
- Episcepsis moloneyi (H. Druce, 1897)

Synonyms
- Aclytia moloneyi H. Druce, 1897; Epidesma moloneyi

Species of moth

Episcepsis moloneyi is a moth of the family Erebidae. It was described by Herbert Druce in 1897. It is found in Belize.
