= Episcepsis hampsoni =

Scientific classification
- Domain: Eukaryota
- Kingdom: Animalia
- Phylum: Arthropoda
- Class: Insecta
- Order: Lepidoptera
- Superfamily: Noctuoidea
- Family: Erebidae
- Subfamily: Arctiinae
- Genus: Episcepsis
- Species: E. hampsoni

Binomial name
- Episcepsis hampsoni Rothschild, 1911

Synonyms
- Epidesma hampsoni

Species of moth

Episcepsis hampsoni is a moth of the family Erebidae. It was described by Walter Rothschild in 1911. It is found in Suriname.
