= Heliura nivaca =

Scientific classification
- Kingdom: Animalia
- Phylum: Arthropoda
- Clade: Pancrustacea
- Class: Insecta
- Order: Lepidoptera
- Superfamily: Noctuoidea
- Family: Erebidae
- Subfamily: Arctiinae
- Genus: Heliura
- Species: H. nivaca

Binomial name
- Heliura nivaca E. D. Jones, 1915

Species of moth

Heliura nivaca is a moth of the subfamily Arctiinae. It was described by E. Dukinfield Jones in 1915. It is found in Brazil.
