= Episcepsis capysca =

Scientific classification
- Domain: Eukaryota
- Kingdom: Animalia
- Phylum: Arthropoda
- Class: Insecta
- Order: Lepidoptera
- Superfamily: Noctuoidea
- Family: Erebidae
- Subfamily: Arctiinae
- Genus: Episcepsis
- Species: E. capysca

Binomial name
- Episcepsis capysca (Schaus, 1910)

Synonyms
- Epidesma capysca Schaus, 1910

Species of moth

Episcepsis capysca is a moth of the family Erebidae. It was described by William Schaus in 1910. It is found in Costa Rica.

== Description ==
Legs and palpi dark grey streaked with white; forecoxae with white streak. Head ochreous spotted with black; the frons blackish with a few white scales. Collar brown black, with some ochreous shading in front and laterally. Thorax brownish black; a grey line on patagia. Abdomen blue black; a ventral row of white spots. Primaries dark olive brown; the veins and a streak in cell and one below it grey; the apex broadly snowy white. Secondaries bluish black; a semihyaline (almost glass-like) streak below cell, slightly in it, and also beyond it shortly.

Wingspan 30 mm.
