= Episcepsis obsoleta =

Scientific classification
- Kingdom: Animalia
- Phylum: Arthropoda
- Class: Insecta
- Order: Lepidoptera
- Superfamily: Noctuoidea
- Family: Erebidae
- Subfamily: Arctiinae
- Genus: Episcepsis
- Species: E. obsoleta

Binomial name
- Episcepsis obsoleta (Burmeister, 1878)

Synonyms
- Charidea obsoleta Burmeister, 1878; Epidesma obsoleta

Species of moth

Episcepsis obsoleta is a moth of the family Erebidae. It was described by Hermann Burmeister in 1878. It is found in Argentina.
