= Heliura episcepsidis =

Scientific classification
- Kingdom: Animalia
- Phylum: Arthropoda
- Clade: Pancrustacea
- Class: Insecta
- Order: Lepidoptera
- Superfamily: Noctuoidea
- Family: Erebidae
- Subfamily: Arctiinae
- Genus: Heliura
- Species: H. episcepsidis

Binomial name
- Heliura episcepsidis (Dyar, 1914)

Synonyms
- Ptychotrichos episcepsidis Dyar, 1914

Species of moth

Heliura episcepsidis is a moth of the subfamily Arctiinae. It was described by Harrison Gray Dyar Jr. in 1914. It is found in Panama and Honduras.
