= Heliura baliodes =

Scientific classification
- Kingdom: Animalia
- Phylum: Arthropoda
- Clade: Pancrustacea
- Class: Insecta
- Order: Lepidoptera
- Superfamily: Noctuoidea
- Family: Erebidae
- Subfamily: Arctiinae
- Genus: Heliura
- Species: H. baliodes

Binomial name
- Heliura baliodes Hampson, 1914

Species of moth

Heliura baliodes is a moth of the subfamily Arctiinae. It was described by George Hampson in 1914. It is found in French Guiana.

== Bibliography ==
- Pitkin, Brian & Jenkins, Paul. "Search results Family: Arctiidae". Butterflies and Moths of the World. Natural History Museum, London.
