= Hyaleucerea gigantea =

Scientific classification
- Domain: Eukaryota
- Kingdom: Animalia
- Phylum: Arthropoda
- Class: Insecta
- Order: Lepidoptera
- Superfamily: Noctuoidea
- Family: Erebidae
- Subfamily: Arctiinae
- Genus: Hyaleucerea
- Species: H. gigantea

Binomial name
- Hyaleucerea gigantea (H. Druce, 1884)

Synonyms
- Epanycles gigantea H. Druce, 1884

Species of moth

Hyaleucerea gigantea is a moth of the subfamily Arctiinae. It was described by Herbert Druce in 1884. It is found in Guatemala and Panama.
