= Episcepsis rypoperas =

Scientific classification
- Kingdom: Animalia
- Phylum: Arthropoda
- Class: Insecta
- Order: Lepidoptera
- Superfamily: Noctuoidea
- Family: Erebidae
- Subfamily: Arctiinae
- Genus: Episcepsis
- Species: E. rypoperas

Binomial name
- Episcepsis rypoperas Hampson, 1898

Synonyms
- Epidesma rhypoperas auctt.; Episcepcis rypoperas Hernández-Baz, 2013

Species of moth

Episcepsis rypoperas is a moth of the family Erebidae. It was described by George Hampson in 1898. It is found in Belize.
