= Pseudohyaleucerea bartschi =

Scientific classification
- Kingdom: Animalia
- Phylum: Arthropoda
- Class: Insecta
- Order: Lepidoptera
- Superfamily: Noctuoidea
- Family: Erebidae
- Subfamily: Arctiinae
- Genus: Pseudohyaleucerea
- Species: P. bartschi

Binomial name
- Pseudohyaleucerea bartschi (Schaus, 1928)

Synonyms
- Pseudomya bartschi Schaus, 1928

Species of moth

Pseudohyaleucerea bartschi is a moth in the subfamily Arctiinae. It was described by Schaus in 1928. It is found on the Bahamas.
