= Pseudohyaleucerea nigrozonum =

Scientific classification
- Kingdom: Animalia
- Phylum: Arthropoda
- Class: Insecta
- Order: Lepidoptera
- Superfamily: Noctuoidea
- Family: Erebidae
- Subfamily: Arctiinae
- Genus: Pseudohyaleucerea
- Species: P. nigrozonum

Binomial name
- Pseudohyaleucerea nigrozonum (Schaus, 1905)

Synonyms
- Pseudomya nigrozonum Schaus, 1905; Pseudomya nigrozona Schaus, 1920

Species of moth

Pseudohyaleucerea nigrozonum is a moth in the subfamily Arctiinae. It was described by Schaus in 1905. It is found in French Guiana.
