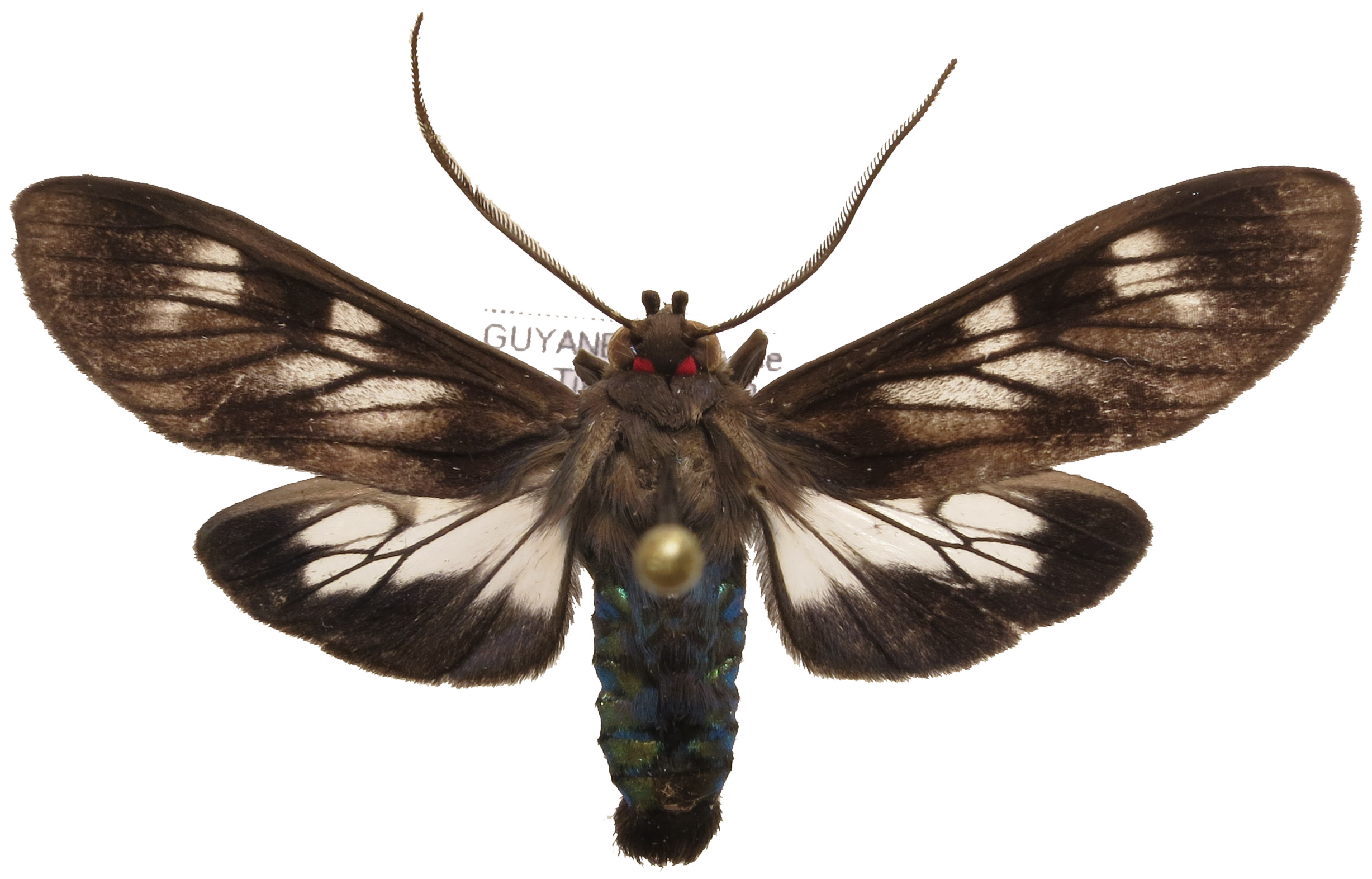
- From French Guiana

Scientific classification
- Kingdom: Animalia
- Phylum: Arthropoda
- Clade: Pancrustacea
- Class: Insecta
- Order: Lepidoptera
- Superfamily: Noctuoidea
- Family: Erebidae
- Subfamily: Arctiinae
- Genus: Heliura
- Species: H. suffusa

Binomial name
- Heliura suffusa (Lathy, 1899)

Synonyms
- Neacerea suffusa Lathy, 1899

= Heliura suffusa =

Species of moth

Heliura suffusa is a moth of the subfamily Arctiinae. It was described by Percy Ireland Lathy in 1899. It is found in Guyana.
