= Episcepsis ockendeni =

Scientific classification
- Domain: Eukaryota
- Kingdom: Animalia
- Phylum: Arthropoda
- Class: Insecta
- Order: Lepidoptera
- Superfamily: Noctuoidea
- Family: Erebidae
- Subfamily: Arctiinae
- Genus: Episcepsis
- Species: E. ockendeni

Binomial name
- Episcepsis ockendeni Rothschild, 1911

Synonyms
- Episcepsis occendeni Hampson, 1914; Epidesma ockendeni

Species of moth

Episcepsis ockendeni is a moth of the family Erebidae. It was described by Walter Rothschild in 1911. It is found in Peru.
