= Episcepsis lamia =

Scientific classification
- Domain: Eukaryota
- Kingdom: Animalia
- Phylum: Arthropoda
- Class: Insecta
- Order: Lepidoptera
- Superfamily: Noctuoidea
- Family: Erebidae
- Subfamily: Arctiinae
- Genus: Episcepsis
- Species: E. lamia

Binomial name
- Episcepsis lamia (Butler, 1877)

Synonyms
- Heliura lamia Butler, 1877; Epidesma lamia

Species of moth

Episcepsis lamia is a moth of the family Erebidae. It was described by Arthur Gardiner Butler in 1877. It is found in the Amazon region, Guatemala and Costa Rica.

== Description ==
Head and thorax fuscous brown; two scarlet spots on back of head and two on lower part of tegulae; fore coxae crimson; abdomen metallic blue green, with the rough hair at base blackish; the ventral surface fuscous, with sublateral white lines on basal half. Forewing uniform fuscous brown. Hindwing black, shot with blue; hyaline streaks in, below, and beyond cell; the tuft on inner area whitish.

Wingspan 34 mm.

== External References ==
- Episcepsis lamia at BHL
- Beccaloni, G.; Scoble, M.; Kitching, I.; Simonsen, T.; Robinson, G.; Pitkin, B.; Hine, A.; Lyal, C., eds. (2003). "Episcepsis lamia". The Global Lepidoptera Names Index. Natural History Museum. Retrieved April 20, 2018.
