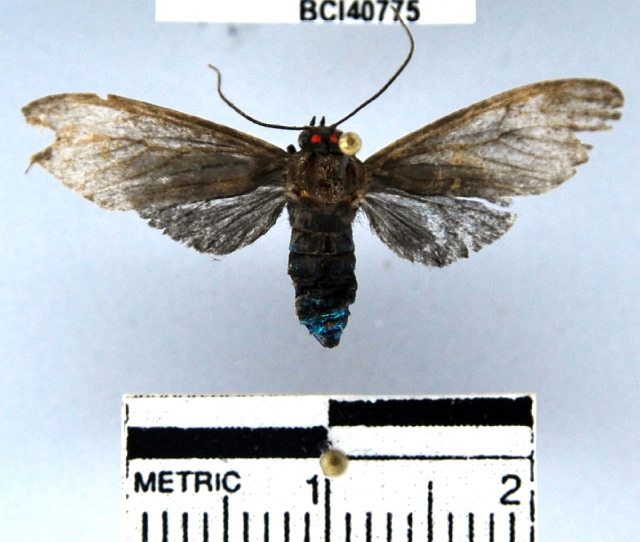

Scientific classification
- Domain: Eukaryota
- Kingdom: Animalia
- Phylum: Arthropoda
- Class: Insecta
- Order: Lepidoptera
- Superfamily: Noctuoidea
- Family: Erebidae
- Subfamily: Arctiinae
- Genus: Episcepsis
- Species: E. venata

Binomial name
- Episcepsis venata Butler, 1877

Synonyms
- Epidesma venata; Heliura aelia Schaus, 1889; Episcepcis venata Hernández-Baz, 2013

= Episcepsis venata =

Species of moth

Episcepsis venata is a moth of the family Erebidae. It was described by Arthur Gardiner Butler in 1877. It is found in Mexico and the Amazon region.

== Description ==
Wings hyaline, the veins black; primaries brownish, with the apex, base, external angle, margins, and a spot on the discocellulars, dark brown; secondaries hyaline white, with a broad external black border. Body dark brown; frons white-spotted; back of head and sides of collar spotted with carmine; abdomen shot with blue, terminal segments above metallic green; collar below white-spotted; legs white below, trochanters of first pair rose red; ventral side white in the centre, grey brown at the sides, with a row of small reddish-yellow spots; genitalia yellow.

Wingspan Expanse of wings 1 inch 1 line.
