= Heliura emerentia =

Scientific classification
- Kingdom: Animalia
- Phylum: Arthropoda
- Clade: Pancrustacea
- Class: Insecta
- Order: Lepidoptera
- Superfamily: Noctuoidea
- Family: Erebidae
- Subfamily: Arctiinae
- Genus: Heliura
- Species: H. emerentia

Binomial name
- Heliura emerentia Dognin, 1898

Species of moth

Heliura emerentia is a moth of the subfamily Arctiinae. It was described by Paul Dognin in 1898. It is found in Ecuador.
