= Episcepsis capyscoides =

Scientific classification
- Domain: Eukaryota
- Kingdom: Animalia
- Phylum: Arthropoda
- Class: Insecta
- Order: Lepidoptera
- Superfamily: Noctuoidea
- Family: Erebidae
- Subfamily: Arctiinae
- Genus: Episcepsis
- Species: E. capyscoides

Binomial name
- Episcepsis capyscoides Dognin, 1911

Synonyms
- Epidesma capyscoides

Species of moth

Episcepsis capyscoides is a moth of the family Erebidae. It was described by Paul Dognin in 1911. It is found in French Guiana.
