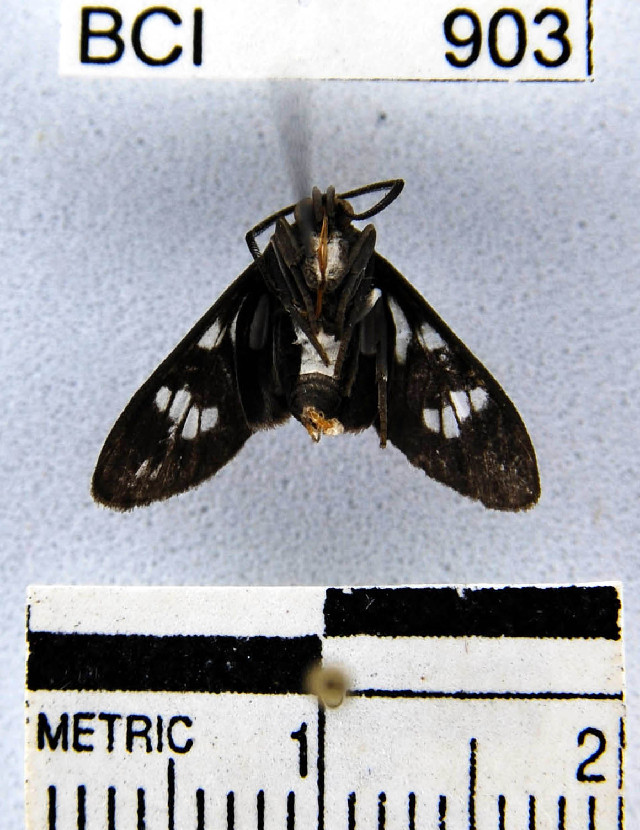
- Heliura banoca

Scientific classification
- Kingdom: Animalia
- Phylum: Arthropoda
- Class: Insecta
- Order: Lepidoptera
- Superfamily: Noctuoidea
- Family: Erebidae
- Subfamily: Arctiinae
- Genus: Heliura; Butler, 1876

= Heliura =

Genus of moths

Heliura is a genus of moths in the subfamily Arctiinae. The genus was erected by Arthur Gardiner Butler in 1876.

== Species ==
The genus includes the following species:

- Heliura amazonicum Rothschild, 1912
- Heliura assimilis Rothschild, 1912
- Heliura baleris Dyar, 1910
- Heliura balia Hampson, 1898
- Heliura baliodes Hampson, 1914
- Heliura banoca Dyar, 1914
- Heliura beneluzi Pinheiro & Cerda, 2016
- Heliura cadroe Schaus, 1924
- Heliura cosmosomodes Dognin, 1916
- Heliura crameri Pinheiro & Cerda, 2016
- Heliura elongata Rothschild, 1912
- Heliura emerentia Dognin, 1898
- Heliura episcepsidis Dyar, 1914
- Heliura excavata Dognin, 1910
- Heliura flavopunctata Dognin, 1911
- Heliura fulvipicta Kaye, 1911
- Heliura fumata Rothschild, 1912
- Heliura gigantea Druce, 1900
- Heliura hagmanni Zerny, 1931
- Heliura hecale Schaus, 1892
- Heliura kennedyi Rothschild, 1912
- Heliura klagesi Rothschild
- Heliura laguerrei Pinheiro & Cerda, 2016
- Heliura mimula Draudt, 1917
- Heliura nathalan Schaus, 1924
- Heliura nigriventris Pinheiro & Duarte, 2016
- Heliura nivaca E. D. Jones, 1915
- Heliura ockendeni Rothschild, 1912
- Heliura pauloi Pinheiro & Duarte, 2016
- Heliura perexcavatum Rothschild, 1912
- Heliura phaeosoma Druce, 1905
- Heliura pierus Cramer, 1782
- Heliura postcoeruleum Rothschild, 1912
- Heliura quadriflavata Kaye, 1919
- Heliura rhodocryptoides Draudt, 1931
- Heliura rhodophila Walker, 1856
- Heliura sanguipalpia Hampson, 1898
- Heliura semihyalina Rothschild, 1912
- Heliura stolli Rothschild, 1912
- Heliura suffusa Lathy, 1899
- Heliura tetragramma Walker, 1854
- Heliura thysbe Möschler, 1877
- Heliura thysbodes Dognin, 1914
- Heliura umbrimacula Schaus, 1905
- Heliura valviviai Grados, 1999
- Heliura viridicingulata Rothschild, 1912
- Heliura zonata Druce, 1905
