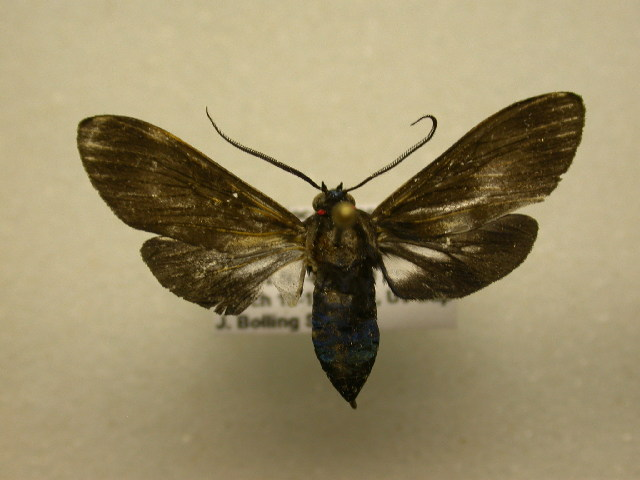

Scientific classification
- Domain: Eukaryota
- Kingdom: Animalia
- Phylum: Arthropoda
- Class: Insecta
- Order: Lepidoptera
- Superfamily: Noctuoidea
- Family: Erebidae
- Subfamily: Arctiinae
- Genus: Episcepsis
- Species: E. sixola

Binomial name
- Episcepsis sixola Schaus, 1910

Synonyms
- Epidesma sixola

= Episcepsis sixola =

Species of moth

Episcepsis sixola is a moth of the family Erebidae. It was described by William Schaus in 1910. It is found in Costa Rica.

== Description ==
Palpi and legs brown black. Palpi with a white spot on first segment. White spots at base and end of coxae; fore coxae streaked with white in male, with roseate in female. Collar and thorax brown black, the former with dorsal and lateral red spots. Abdomen dull blue black, underneath with two rows of white spots. Primaries brown black, the veins still darker; a vague subterminal broad darker shade. Secondaries black; a short white streak in cell, and a large white patch at base of inner margin; some white scales beyond cell between veins 2 and 5. The female's wing span is 37 mm and the male's 34 mm.
