= Heliura thysbodes =

Scientific classification
- Kingdom: Animalia
- Phylum: Arthropoda
- Clade: Pancrustacea
- Class: Insecta
- Order: Lepidoptera
- Superfamily: Noctuoidea
- Family: Erebidae
- Subfamily: Arctiinae
- Genus: Heliura
- Species: H. thysbodes

Binomial name
- Heliura thysbodes Dognin, 1914

Synonyms
- Heliura perfusa Dognin, 1923

Species of moth

Heliura thysbodes is a moth of the subfamily Arctiinae. It was described by Paul Dognin in 1914. It is found in Colombia and Brazil.
