= Heliura thysbe =

Scientific classification
- Kingdom: Animalia
- Phylum: Arthropoda
- Clade: Pancrustacea
- Class: Insecta
- Order: Lepidoptera
- Superfamily: Noctuoidea
- Family: Erebidae
- Subfamily: Arctiinae
- Genus: Heliura
- Species: H. thysbe

Binomial name
- Heliura thysbe (Möschler, 1877)

Synonyms
- Acridopsis thysbe Möschler, 1878

Species of moth

Heliura thysbe is a moth of the subfamily Arctiinae. It was described by Heinrich Benno Möschler in 1877. It is found in Suriname.
