= Episcepsis grisescens =

Scientific classification
- Kingdom: Animalia
- Phylum: Arthropoda
- Class: Insecta
- Order: Lepidoptera
- Superfamily: Noctuoidea
- Family: Erebidae
- Subfamily: Arctiinae
- Genus: Episcepsis
- Species: E. grisescens

Binomial name
- Episcepsis grisescens Hampson, 1914

Synonyms
- Epidesma grisescens

Species of moth

Episcepsis grisescens is a moth of the family Erebidae. It was described by George Hampson in 1914. It is found in Venezuela.
