= Hyaleucerea leucoprocta =

Scientific classification
- Domain: Eukaryota
- Kingdom: Animalia
- Phylum: Arthropoda
- Class: Insecta
- Order: Lepidoptera
- Superfamily: Noctuoidea
- Family: Erebidae
- Subfamily: Arctiinae
- Genus: Hyaleucerea
- Species: H. leucoprocta

Binomial name
- Hyaleucerea leucoprocta Dognin, 1909

Species of moth

Hyaleucerea leucoprocta is a moth of the subfamily Arctiinae. It was described by Paul Dognin in 1909. It is found in French Guiana.
