= Hyaleucerea trifasciata =

Scientific classification
- Domain: Eukaryota
- Kingdom: Animalia
- Phylum: Arthropoda
- Class: Insecta
- Order: Lepidoptera
- Superfamily: Noctuoidea
- Family: Erebidae
- Subfamily: Arctiinae
- Genus: Hyaleucerea
- Species: H. trifasciata

Binomial name
- Hyaleucerea trifasciata (Butler, 1877)

Synonyms
- Scepsis trifasciata Butler, 1877

Species of moth

Hyaleucerea trifasciata is a moth of the subfamily Arctiinae. It was described by Arthur Gardiner Butler in 1877. It is found in the Amazon region.
