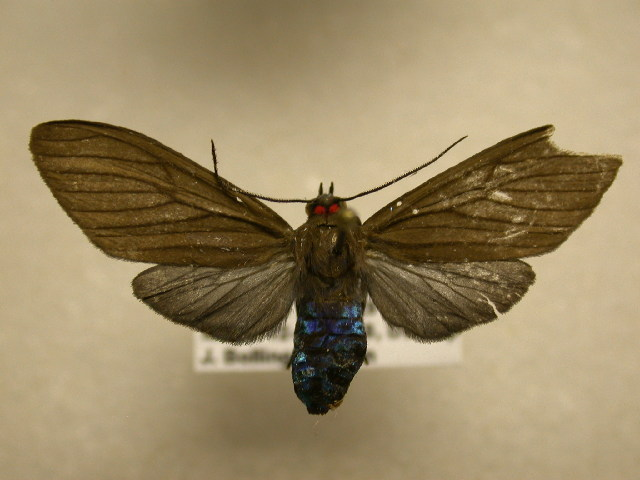

Scientific classification
- Domain: Eukaryota
- Kingdom: Animalia
- Phylum: Arthropoda
- Class: Insecta
- Order: Lepidoptera
- Superfamily: Noctuoidea
- Family: Erebidae
- Subfamily: Arctiinae
- Genus: Episcepsis
- Species: E. redunda

Binomial name
- Episcepsis redunda Schaus, 1910

Synonyms
- Epidesma redunda

= Episcepsis redunda =

Species of moth

Episcepsis redunda is a moth of the family Erebidae. It was described by William Schaus in 1910. It is found in Mexico, Costa Rica, Trinidad, Venezuela, French Guiana, Guyana and Peru.
