= Hyaleucerea mundula =

Scientific classification
- Domain: Eukaryota
- Kingdom: Animalia
- Phylum: Arthropoda
- Class: Insecta
- Order: Lepidoptera
- Superfamily: Noctuoidea
- Family: Erebidae
- Subfamily: Arctiinae
- Genus: Hyaleucerea
- Species: H. mundula

Binomial name
- Hyaleucerea mundula (Berg, 1882)

Synonyms
- Halysidota mundula Berg, 1882

Species of moth

Hyaleucerea mundula is a moth of the subfamily Arctiinae. It was described by Carlos Berg in 1882 and is found in Brazil.
