= Episcepsis rotundipennis =

Scientific classification
- Domain: Eukaryota
- Kingdom: Animalia
- Phylum: Arthropoda
- Class: Insecta
- Order: Lepidoptera
- Superfamily: Noctuoidea
- Family: Erebidae
- Subfamily: Arctiinae
- Genus: Episcepsis
- Species: E. rotundipennis

Binomial name
- Episcepsis rotundipennis Zerny, 1931

Synonyms
- Epidesma rotundipennis

Species of moth

Episcepsis rotundipennis is a moth of the family Erebidae. It was described by Hans Zerny in 1931. It is found in Bolivia.
