= Heliura kennedyi =

Scientific classification
- Kingdom: Animalia
- Phylum: Arthropoda
- Clade: Pancrustacea
- Class: Insecta
- Order: Lepidoptera
- Superfamily: Noctuoidea
- Family: Erebidae
- Subfamily: Arctiinae
- Genus: Heliura
- Species: H. kennedyi

Binomial name
- Heliura kennedyi (Rothschild, 1912)

Synonyms
- Eucereum kennedyi Rothschild, 1912

Species of moth

Heliura kennedyi is a moth of the subfamily Arctiinae. It was described by Rothschild in 1912. It is found in Brazil.
