= Episcepsis endodasia =

Scientific classification
- Kingdom: Animalia
- Phylum: Arthropoda
- Class: Insecta
- Order: Lepidoptera
- Superfamily: Noctuoidea
- Family: Erebidae
- Subfamily: Arctiinae
- Genus: Episcepsis
- Species: E. endodasia

Binomial name
- Episcepsis endodasia Hampson, 1898

Synonyms
- Epidesma endodasia

Species of moth

Episcepsis endodasia is a moth of the family Erebidae. It was described by George Hampson in 1898. It is found in Paraná, Brazil.
