= Heliura quadriflavata =

Scientific classification
- Kingdom: Animalia
- Phylum: Arthropoda
- Clade: Pancrustacea
- Class: Insecta
- Order: Lepidoptera
- Superfamily: Noctuoidea
- Family: Erebidae
- Subfamily: Arctiinae
- Genus: Heliura
- Species: H. quadriflavata

Binomial name
- Heliura quadriflavata Kaye, 1919

Species of moth

Heliura quadriflavata is a moth of the subfamily Arctiinae. It was described by William James Kaye in 1919. It is found in Guyana.
