= Episcepsis melanitis =

Scientific classification
- Kingdom: Animalia
- Phylum: Arthropoda
- Class: Insecta
- Order: Lepidoptera
- Superfamily: Noctuoidea
- Family: Erebidae
- Subfamily: Arctiinae
- Genus: Episcepsis
- Species: E. melanitis

Binomial name
- Episcepsis melanitis (Hübner, 1818)

Synonyms
- Centronia melanitis Hübner, 1818; Epidesma melanitis

Species of moth

Episcepsis melanitis is a moth of the family Erebidae. It was described by Jacob Hübner in 1818. It is found in Guyana.
