= Heliura postcoeruleum =

Scientific classification
- Kingdom: Animalia
- Phylum: Arthropoda
- Clade: Pancrustacea
- Class: Insecta
- Order: Lepidoptera
- Superfamily: Noctuoidea
- Family: Erebidae
- Subfamily: Arctiinae
- Genus: Heliura
- Species: H. postcoeruleum

Binomial name
- Heliura postcoeruleum (Rothschild, 1912)

Synonyms
- Eucereum postcoeruleum Rothschild, 1912; Euecereon maricoides Strand, 1917

Species of moth

Heliura postcoeruleum is a moth of the subfamily Arctiinae. It was described by Rothschild in 1912. It is found in Venezuela.
