= Heliura baleris =

Scientific classification
- Kingdom: Animalia
- Phylum: Arthropoda
- Clade: Pancrustacea
- Class: Insecta
- Order: Lepidoptera
- Superfamily: Noctuoidea
- Family: Erebidae
- Subfamily: Arctiinae
- Genus: Heliura
- Species: H. baleris

Binomial name
- Heliura baleris Dyar, 1910

Species of moth

Heliura baleris is a moth of the subfamily Arctiinae. It was described by Harrison Gray Dyar Jr. in 1910. It is found in Mexico.
