= Episcepsis sordidus =

Scientific classification
- Domain: Eukaryota
- Kingdom: Animalia
- Phylum: Arthropoda
- Class: Insecta
- Order: Lepidoptera
- Superfamily: Noctuoidea
- Family: Erebidae
- Subfamily: Arctiinae
- Genus: Episcepsis
- Species: E. sordidus

Binomial name
- Episcepsis sordidus Rothschild, 1911

Synonyms
- Epidesma sordida; Epidesma sordidus

Species of moth

Episcepsis sordidus is a moth of the family Erebidae. It was described by Walter Rothschild in 1911. It is found in Venezuela.
