= Episcepsis erynnis =

Scientific classification
- Domain: Eukaryota
- Kingdom: Animalia
- Phylum: Arthropoda
- Class: Insecta
- Order: Lepidoptera
- Superfamily: Noctuoidea
- Family: Erebidae
- Subfamily: Arctiinae
- Genus: Episcepsis
- Species: E. erynnis

Binomial name
- Episcepsis erynnis (Fabricius, 1777)

Synonyms
- Zygaena erynnis Fabricius, 1777; Epidesma erynnis

Species of moth

Episcepsis erynnis is a moth of the family Erebidae. It was described by Johan Christian Fabricius in 1777. It is found in Suriname.
