= Heliura fulvipicta =

Scientific classification
- Kingdom: Animalia
- Phylum: Arthropoda
- Clade: Pancrustacea
- Class: Insecta
- Order: Lepidoptera
- Superfamily: Noctuoidea
- Family: Erebidae
- Subfamily: Arctiinae
- Genus: Heliura
- Species: H. fulvipicta

Binomial name
- Heliura fulvipicta Kaye, 1911

Species of moth

Heliura fulvipicta is a moth of the subfamily Arctiinae. It was described by William James Kaye in 1911. It is found in Guyana.
