= Hyaleucerea leucosticta =

Scientific classification
- Domain: Eukaryota
- Kingdom: Animalia
- Phylum: Arthropoda
- Class: Insecta
- Order: Lepidoptera
- Superfamily: Noctuoidea
- Family: Erebidae
- Subfamily: Arctiinae
- Genus: Hyaleucerea
- Species: H. leucosticta

Binomial name
- Hyaleucerea leucosticta Druce, 1905

Species of moth

Hyaleucerea leucosticta is a moth of the subfamily Arctiinae. It was described by Druce in 1905. It is found in Venezuela.
