= Hyaleucerea manicorensis =

Scientific classification
- Domain: Eukaryota
- Kingdom: Animalia
- Phylum: Arthropoda
- Class: Insecta
- Order: Lepidoptera
- Superfamily: Noctuoidea
- Family: Erebidae
- Subfamily: Arctiinae
- Genus: Hyaleucerea
- Species: H. manicorensis

Binomial name
- Hyaleucerea manicorensis Rego Barros, 1971

Species of moth

Hyaleucerea manicorensis is a moth of the subfamily Arctiinae. It was described by Rego Barros in 1971. It is found in Brazil.
