= Heliura pierus =

Scientific classification
- Kingdom: Animalia
- Phylum: Arthropoda
- Clade: Pancrustacea
- Class: Insecta
- Order: Lepidoptera
- Superfamily: Noctuoidea
- Family: Erebidae
- Subfamily: Arctiinae
- Genus: Heliura
- Species: H. pierus

Binomial name
- Heliura pierus (Cramer, 1782)

Synonyms
- Sphinx pierus Stoll, [1781]; Acridopsis lucis Butler, 1878

Species of moth

Heliura pierus is a moth of the subfamily Arctiinae. It was described by Pieter Cramer in 1782. It is found in the Amazon region.
