= Hyaleucerea costinotatum =

Scientific classification
- Domain: Eukaryota
- Kingdom: Animalia
- Phylum: Arthropoda
- Class: Insecta
- Order: Lepidoptera
- Superfamily: Noctuoidea
- Family: Erebidae
- Subfamily: Arctiinae
- Genus: Hyaleucerea
- Species: H. costinotatum

Binomial name
- Hyaleucerea costinotatum (Dognin, 1900)

Synonyms
- Eucereon costinotatum Dognin, 1900

Species of moth

Hyaleucerea costinotatum is a type of a moth of the subfamily Arctiinae. It was described by Paul Dognin in 1900. It is found in Ecuador.
