= Heliura balia =

Scientific classification
- Kingdom: Animalia
- Phylum: Arthropoda
- Clade: Pancrustacea
- Class: Insecta
- Order: Lepidoptera
- Superfamily: Noctuoidea
- Family: Erebidae
- Subfamily: Arctiinae
- Genus: Heliura
- Species: H. balia

Binomial name
- Heliura balia (Hampson, 1898)

Synonyms
- Eucereon balia Hampson, 1898

Species of moth

Heliura balia is a moth of the subfamily Arctiinae. It was described by George Hampson in 1898. It is found in Honduras.
