= Hyaleucerea ockendeni =

Scientific classification
- Domain: Eukaryota
- Kingdom: Animalia
- Phylum: Arthropoda
- Class: Insecta
- Order: Lepidoptera
- Superfamily: Noctuoidea
- Family: Erebidae
- Subfamily: Arctiinae
- Genus: Hyaleucerea
- Species: H. ockendeni

Binomial name
- Hyaleucerea ockendeni Rothschild, 1912

Species of moth

Hyaleucerea ockendeni is a moth of the subfamily Arctiinae. It was described by Rothschild in 1912.
