= Heliura ockendeni =

Scientific classification
- Kingdom: Animalia
- Phylum: Arthropoda
- Clade: Pancrustacea
- Class: Insecta
- Order: Lepidoptera
- Superfamily: Noctuoidea
- Family: Erebidae
- Subfamily: Arctiinae
- Genus: Heliura
- Species: H. ockendeni

Binomial name
- Heliura ockendeni Rothschild, 1912

Species of moth

Heliura ockendeni is a moth of the subfamily Arctiinae. It was described by Rothschild in 1912. It is found in Peru.
