= Episcepsis satania =

Scientific classification
- Domain: Eukaryota
- Kingdom: Animalia
- Phylum: Arthropoda
- Class: Insecta
- Order: Lepidoptera
- Superfamily: Noctuoidea
- Family: Erebidae
- Subfamily: Arctiinae
- Genus: Episcepsis
- Species: E. satania

Binomial name
- Episcepsis satania Schaus, 1924

Synonyms
- Epidesma satania

Species of moth

Episcepsis satania is a moth of the family Erebidae. It was described by William Schaus in 1924. It is found in Mexico.
