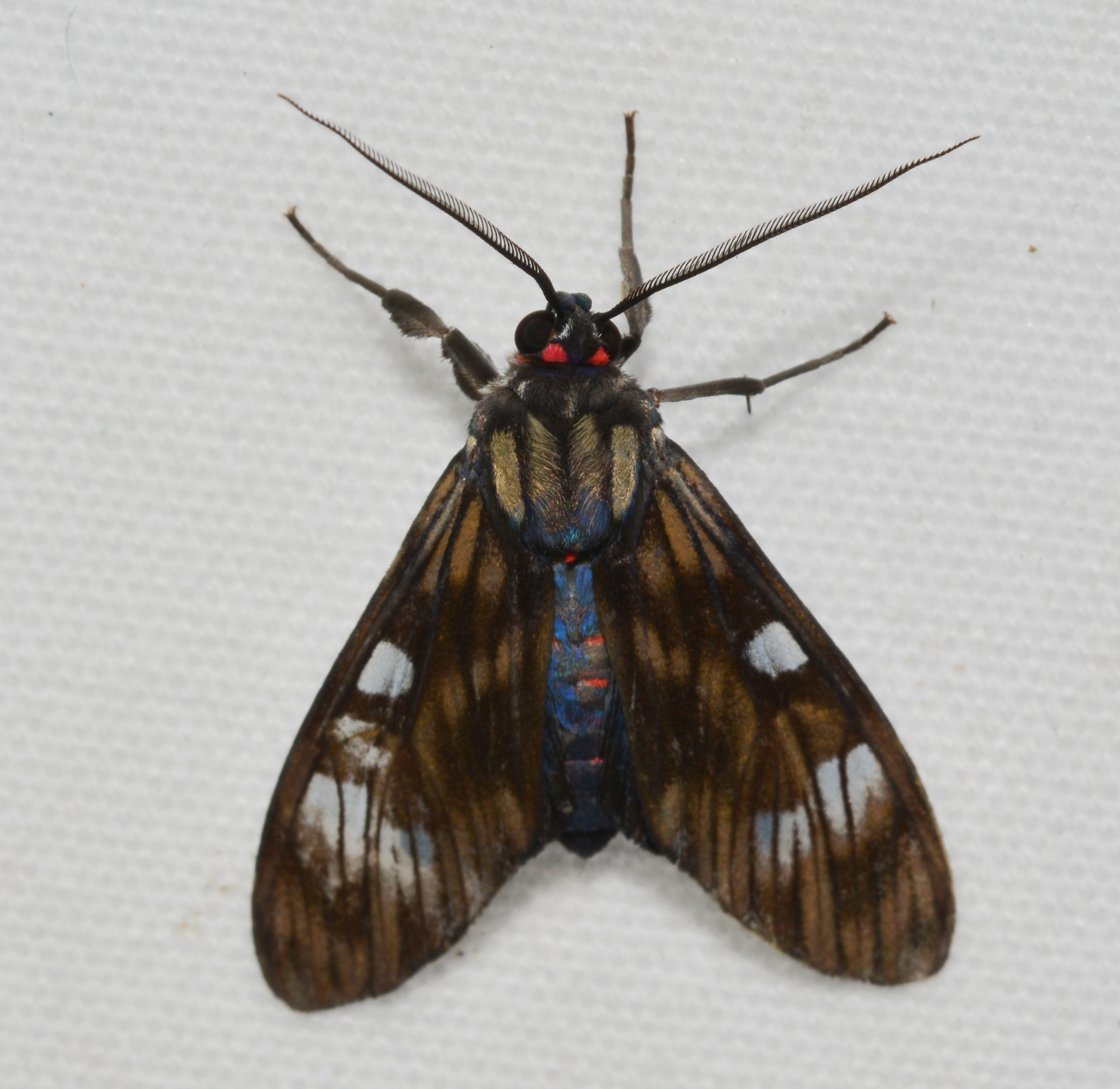
- Episcepsis demonis

Scientific classification
- Kingdom: Animalia
- Phylum: Arthropoda
- Clade: Pancrustacea
- Class: Insecta
- Order: Lepidoptera
- Superfamily: Noctuoidea
- Family: Erebidae
- Subfamily: Arctiinae
- Subtribe: Ctenuchina
- Genus: Episcepsis; Butler, 1877

Synonyms
- Centronia Hübner, 1818; Episcepcis Hernández-Baz, 2013

= Episcepsis =

Genus of moths

Episcepsis is a genus of tiger moths in the family Erebidae. The genus was erected by Arthur Gardiner Butler in 1877.

== Species ==
- Episcepsis capysca (Schaus, 1910)
- Episcepsis capyscoides Dognin, 1911
- Episcepsis demonis (Druce, 1896)
- Episcepsis dominicensis Rothschild, 1911
- Episcepsis endodasia Hampson, 1898
- Episcepsis erynnis (Fabricius, 1777)
- Episcepsis flavipuncta Zerny, 1931
- Episcepsis frances Dyar, 1910
- Episcepsis gnoma (Butler, 1877)
- Episcepsis gnomoides Schaus, 1910
- Episcepsis grisescens Hampson, 1914
- Episcepsis hampsoni Rothschild, 1911
- Episcepsis hypoleuca Hampson, 1898
- Episcepsis inornata (Walker, 1856)
- Episcepsis klagesi Rothschild, 1911
- Episcepsis lamia (Butler, 1877)
- Episcepsis lenaeus (Cramer, 1780)
- Episcepsis littoralis Rothschild, 1911
- Episcepsis luctuosa (Möschler, 1877)
- Episcepsis melanitis (Hübner, 1818)
- Episcepsis melanoneura Zerny, 1931
- Episcepsis melanota (Hampson, 1909)
- Episcepsis moloneyi (Druce, 1897)
- Episcepsis nereus Zerny, 1931
- Episcepsis obsoleta (Burmeister, 1878)
- Episcepsis ockendeni Rothschild, 1911
- Episcepsis phlebitis Dognin, 1913
- Episcepsis pseudothetis Fleming, 1959
- Episcepsis redunda Schaus, 1910
- Episcepsis rotundipennis Zerny, 1931
- Episcepsis rypoperas Hampson, 1898
- Episcepsis satania Schaus, 1924
- Episcepsis sixola Schaus, 1910
- Episcepsis sordidus Rothschild, 1911
- Episcepsis thetis (Linnaeus, 1771)
- Episcepsis venata Butler, 1877
- Episcepsis vinasia Schaus, 1910
