= Heliura umbrimacula =

Scientific classification
- Kingdom: Animalia
- Phylum: Arthropoda
- Clade: Pancrustacea
- Class: Insecta
- Order: Lepidoptera
- Superfamily: Noctuoidea
- Family: Erebidae
- Subfamily: Arctiinae
- Genus: Heliura
- Species: H. umbrimacula

Binomial name
- Heliura umbrimacula Schaus, 1905

Species of moth

Heliura umbrimacula is a moth of the subfamily Arctiinae. It was described by William Schaus in 1905. It is found in French Guiana.
