= Episcepsis phlebitis =

Scientific classification
- Domain: Eukaryota
- Kingdom: Animalia
- Phylum: Arthropoda
- Class: Insecta
- Order: Lepidoptera
- Superfamily: Noctuoidea
- Family: Erebidae
- Subfamily: Arctiinae
- Genus: Episcepsis
- Species: E. phlebitis

Binomial name
- Episcepsis phlebitis Dognin, 1913

Synonyms
- Epidesma phlebitis

Species of moth

Episcepsis phlebitis is a moth of the family Erebidae. It was described by Paul Dognin in 1913. It is found in Belize.
