= Hyaleucerea lemoulti =

Scientific classification
- Domain: Eukaryota
- Kingdom: Animalia
- Phylum: Arthropoda
- Class: Insecta
- Order: Lepidoptera
- Superfamily: Noctuoidea
- Family: Erebidae
- Subfamily: Arctiinae
- Genus: Hyaleucerea
- Species: H. lemoulti

Binomial name
- Hyaleucerea lemoulti (Schaus, 1905)

Synonyms
- Eucereon lemoulti Schaus, 1905

Species of moth

Hyaleucerea lemoulti is a moth of the subfamily Arctiinae. It was described by Schaus in 1905. It is found in Ecuador and French Guiana.

Larvae have been reared on Siparuna species.
