= Episcepsis frances =

Scientific classification
- Kingdom: Animalia
- Phylum: Arthropoda
- Class: Insecta
- Order: Lepidoptera
- Superfamily: Noctuoidea
- Family: Erebidae
- Subfamily: Arctiinae
- Genus: Episcepsis
- Species: E. frances

Binomial name
- Episcepsis frances Dyar, 1910

Synonyms
- Episcepsis frances ab. alboreducta Strand, 1920; Epidesma frances; Centronia frances

Species of moth

Episcepsis frances is a moth of the family Erebidae. It was described by Harrison Gray Dyar Jr. in 1910. It is found in Mexico, Costa Rica, Venezuela, French Guiana, British Guiana, and Peru.

== Description ==
Head and thorax fuscous tinged with grey; the back of head and shoulders with paired crimson spots; fore coxae crimson in front; abdomen metallic blue with the hair on dorsum of basal segments greyish fuscous, the ventral surface with white patches on 1st three segments. Forewing uniform fuscous tinged with grey. Hindwing fuscous black, the lower part of cell and interspaces just below and beyond it with semihyaline white streaks. Underside of forewing with white streak below base of subcostal nervure; hindwing with the lower part of cell and area just below and beyond it and the basal inner area white.

Wingspan 32–36 mm.
