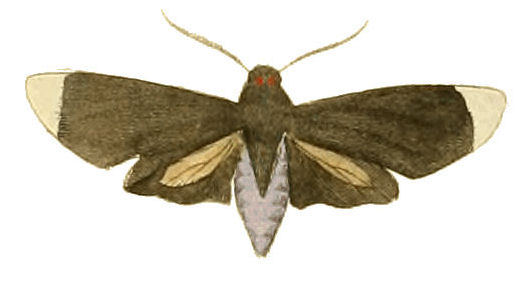

Scientific classification
- Kingdom: Animalia
- Phylum: Arthropoda
- Class: Insecta
- Order: Lepidoptera
- Superfamily: Noctuoidea
- Family: Erebidae
- Subfamily: Arctiinae
- Genus: Episcepsis
- Species: E. thetis

Binomial name
- Episcepsis thetis (Linnaeus, 1771)

Synonyms
- Sphinx thetis Linnaeus, 1771; Epidesma thetis; Zygaena thoos Fabricius, 1781; Episcepcis thetis Hernández-Baz, 2013

= Episcepsis thetis =

Species of moth

Episcepsis thetis is a moth of the family Erebidae. It was described by Carl Linnaeus in 1771. It is found in Panama and Venezuela.

== Description ==
Upperside: Antennae black. Head and thorax black. On the neck are two small scarlet spots just above the eyes, and one on each side below them. Abdomen silvery shining blue, having a triangular black mark at the base. Anterior wings dirty black, immaculate; tips whitish. Posterior wings dirty black, with a white discoidal transparent cloud.

Underside: Breast and sides dirty black. Abdomen white; its sides and tip dirty black. Wings of the same colour as on the upperside.
