= Hyaleucerea uniformis =

Scientific classification
- Domain: Eukaryota
- Kingdom: Animalia
- Phylum: Arthropoda
- Class: Insecta
- Order: Lepidoptera
- Superfamily: Noctuoidea
- Family: Erebidae
- Subfamily: Arctiinae
- Genus: Hyaleucerea
- Species: H. uniformis

Binomial name
- Hyaleucerea uniformis Rothschild, 1912

Species of moth

Hyaleucerea uniformis is a moth of the subfamily Arctiinae. It was described by Rothschild in 1912.
