= Heliura cosmosomodes =

Scientific classification
- Kingdom: Animalia
- Phylum: Arthropoda
- Clade: Pancrustacea
- Class: Insecta
- Order: Lepidoptera
- Superfamily: Noctuoidea
- Family: Erebidae
- Subfamily: Arctiinae
- Genus: Heliura
- Species: H. cosmosomodes

Binomial name
- Heliura cosmosomodes Dognin, 1916

Species of moth

Heliura cosmosomodes is a moth of the subfamily Arctiinae. It was described by Paul Dognin in 1916. It is found in Brazil.
