= Heliura phaeosoma =

Scientific classification
- Kingdom: Animalia
- Phylum: Arthropoda
- Clade: Pancrustacea
- Class: Insecta
- Order: Lepidoptera
- Superfamily: Noctuoidea
- Family: Erebidae
- Subfamily: Arctiinae
- Genus: Heliura
- Species: H. phaeosoma

Binomial name
- Heliura phaeosoma H. Druce, 1905

Species of moth

Heliura phaeosoma is a moth of the subfamily Arctiinae. It was described by Herbert Druce in 1905. It is found in Venezuela.
