= Heliura valviviai =

Scientific classification
- Kingdom: Animalia
- Phylum: Arthropoda
- Clade: Pancrustacea
- Class: Insecta
- Order: Lepidoptera
- Superfamily: Noctuoidea
- Family: Erebidae
- Subfamily: Arctiinae
- Genus: Heliura
- Species: H. valdiviai

Binomial name
- Heliura valdiviai Grados, 1999

Species of moth

Heliura valdiviai is a moth of the subfamily Arctiinae. It was described by Juan Grados in 1999. It is found in Peru. It is named valdiviai in honor of the peruvian biologist Rubén Valdivia Villar.
