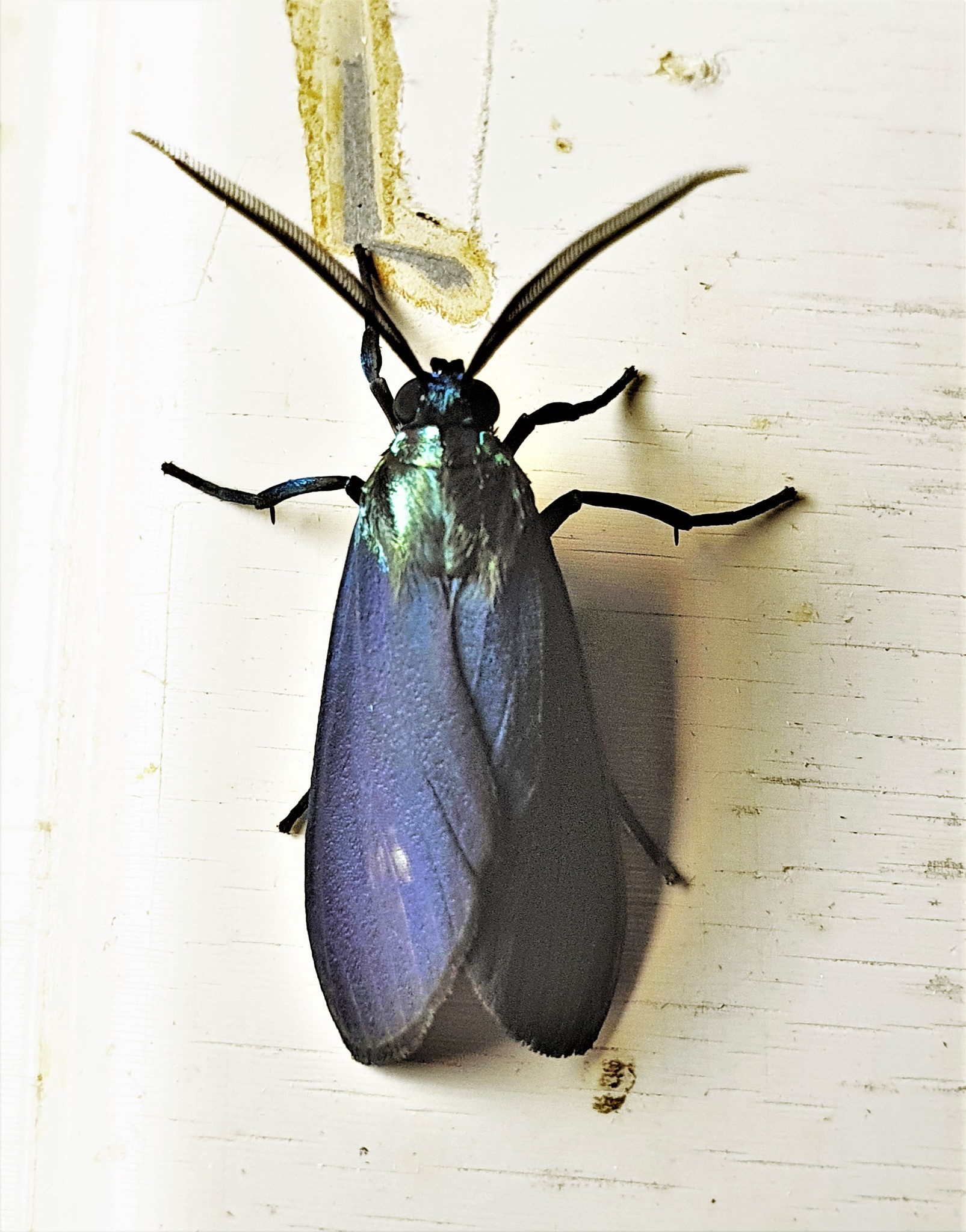

Scientific classification
- Kingdom: Animalia
- Phylum: Arthropoda
- Clade: Pancrustacea
- Class: Insecta
- Order: Lepidoptera
- Superfamily: Noctuoidea
- Family: Erebidae
- Subfamily: Arctiinae
- Genus: Episcepsis
- Species: E. luctuosa

Binomial name
- Episcepsis luctuosa (Möschler, 1877)

Synonyms
- Heliura luctuosa Möschler, 1877; Hyaleucerea luctuosa; Episcepsis scintillans Rothschild, 1911

= Episcepsis luctuosa =

Species of moth

Episcepsis luctuosa is a species of moth in the family Erebidae. It was first described by Heinrich Benno Möschler in 1877. It is found in Venezuela, Suriname and northern Brazil.
