= Heliura hecale =

Scientific classification
- Kingdom: Animalia
- Phylum: Arthropoda
- Clade: Pancrustacea
- Class: Insecta
- Order: Lepidoptera
- Superfamily: Noctuoidea
- Family: Erebidae
- Subfamily: Arctiinae
- Genus: Heliura
- Species: H. hecale

Binomial name
- Heliura hecale (Schaus, 1892)

Synonyms
- Aclytia hecale Schaus, 1892; Hyaleucerea picticeps Hampson, 1903

Species of moth

Heliura hecale is a moth of the subfamily Arctiinae. It was described by Schaus in 1892. It is found in Peru.

== Sources ==
- Pitkin, Brian & Jenkins, Paul. "Search results Family: Arctiidae". Butterflies and Moths of the World. Natural History Museum, London.
