= Pseudohyaleucerea vulnerata =

Scientific classification
- Kingdom: Animalia
- Phylum: Arthropoda
- Class: Insecta
- Order: Lepidoptera
- Superfamily: Noctuoidea
- Family: Erebidae
- Subfamily: Arctiinae
- Genus: Pseudohyaleucerea
- Species: P. vulnerata

Binomial name
- Pseudohyaleucerea vulnerata (Butler, 1875)

Synonyms
- Hyaleucerea vulnerata Butler, 1875; Glaucopis myrrhine Burmeister, 1878; Hyaleucerea boliviana Draudt, 1915

Species of moth

Pseudohyaleucerea vulnerata is a moth of the subfamily Arctiinae. It was described by Arthur Gardiner Butler in 1875. It is found from Mexico to the Brazilian state of Espírito Santo.
