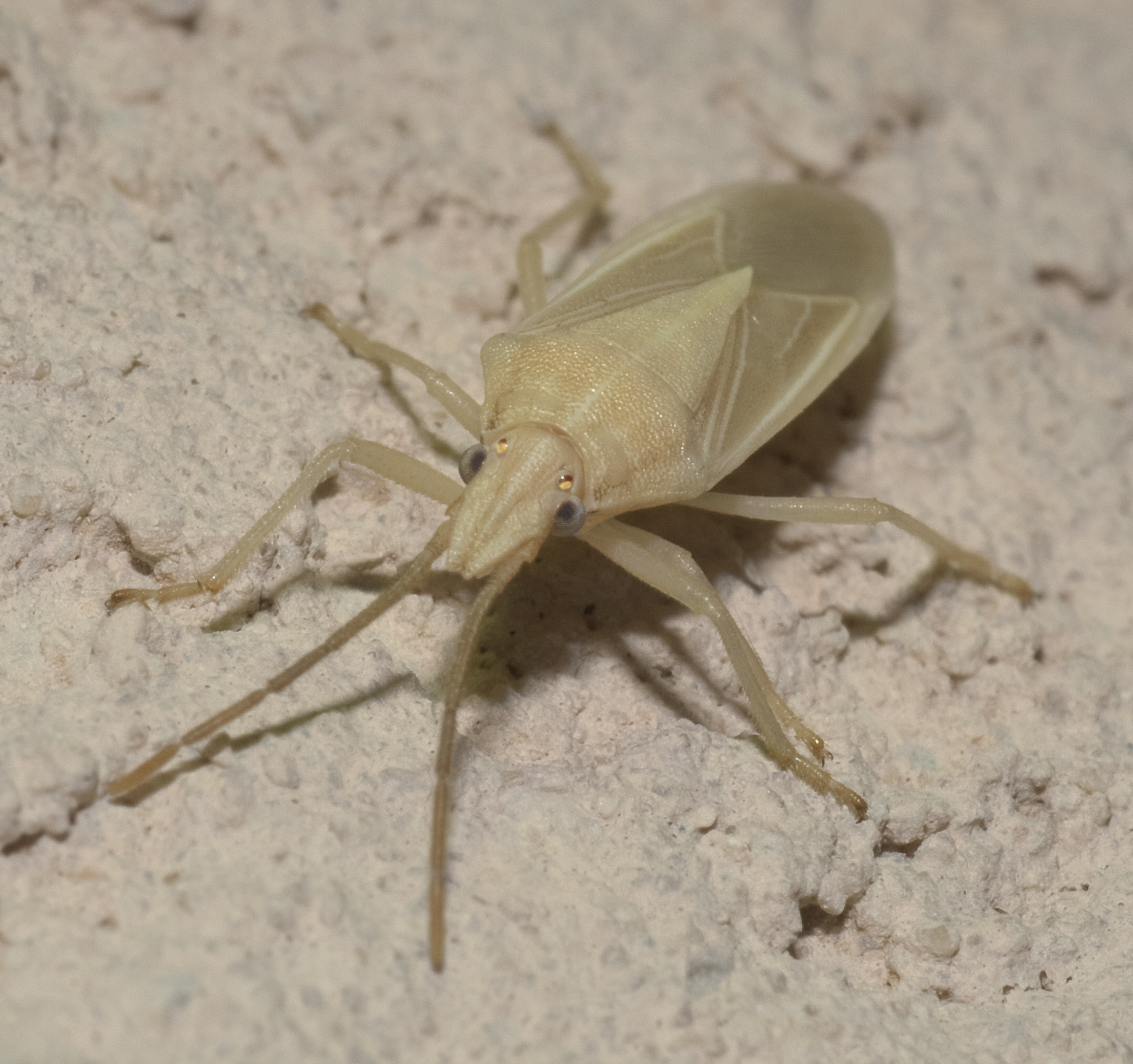

Scientific classification
- Domain: Eukaryota
- Kingdom: Animalia
- Phylum: Arthropoda
- Class: Insecta
- Order: Hemiptera
- Suborder: Heteroptera
- Family: Pentatomidae
- Subfamily: Pentatominae
- Tribe: Mecideini
- Genus: Mecidea; Dallas, 1851

= Mecidea =

Genus of true bugs

Mecidea is a genus of narrow stink bugs in the family Pentatomidae. There are eight described species in Mecidea. Species within this genus feed on grasses like Sideoats grama and there have been some record of this genus eating Asteraceae. They are the only genus within the Mecideini taxonomic tribe to live in the New world.

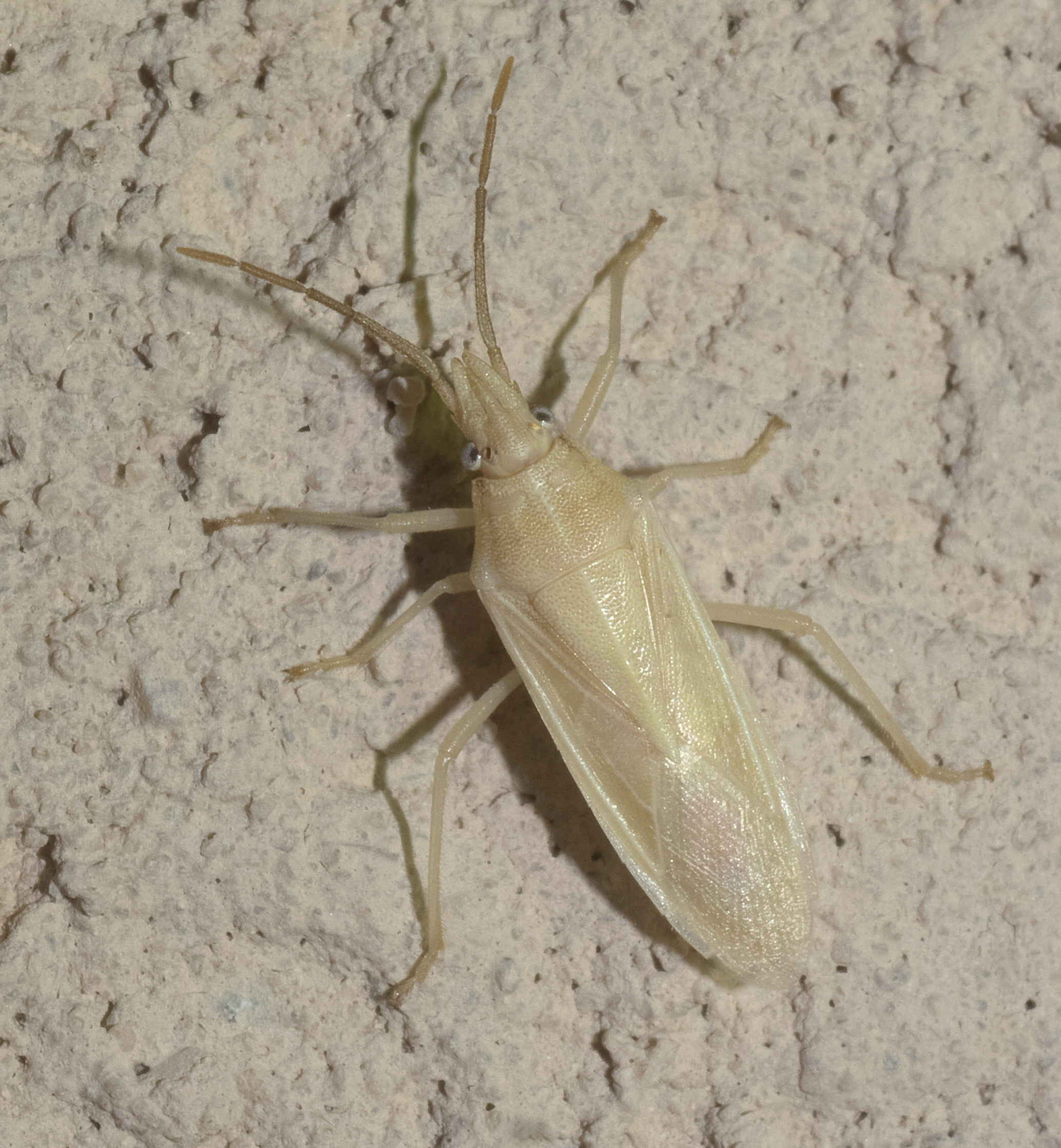
Narrow stink bugs, Mecidea

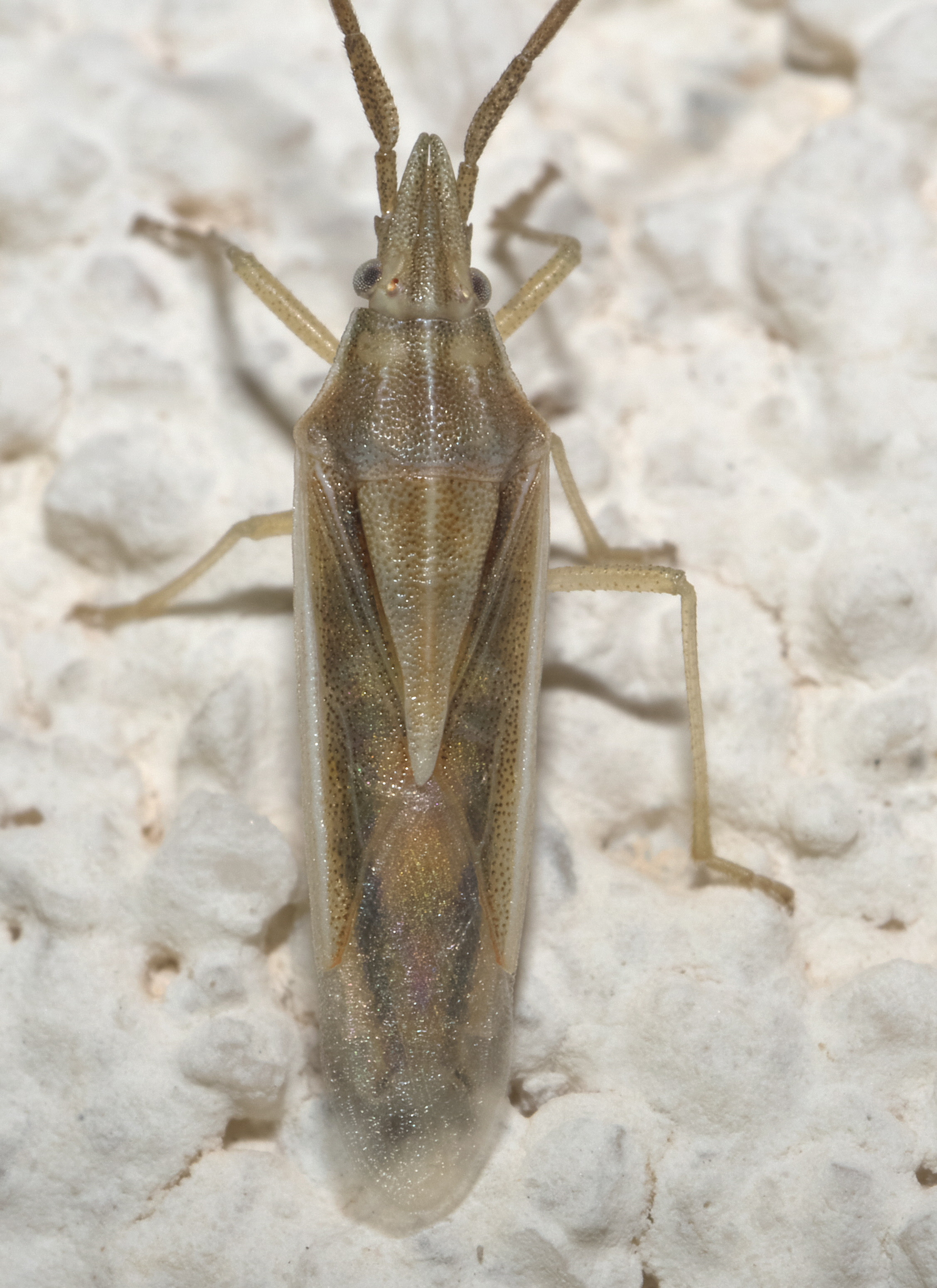
Narrow stink bugs, Mecidea

== Species ==
These eight species belong to the genus Mecidea:

- Mecidea indica Dallas, 1851
- Mecidea lindbergi Wagner, 1954
- Mecidea lutzi Sailer
- Mecidea major Sailer, 1952
- Mecidea minor Ruckes, 1946
- Mecidea pallida Stal, 1845
- Mecidea pallidissima Jensen-Haarup, 1922
- Mecidea pampeana Sailer
