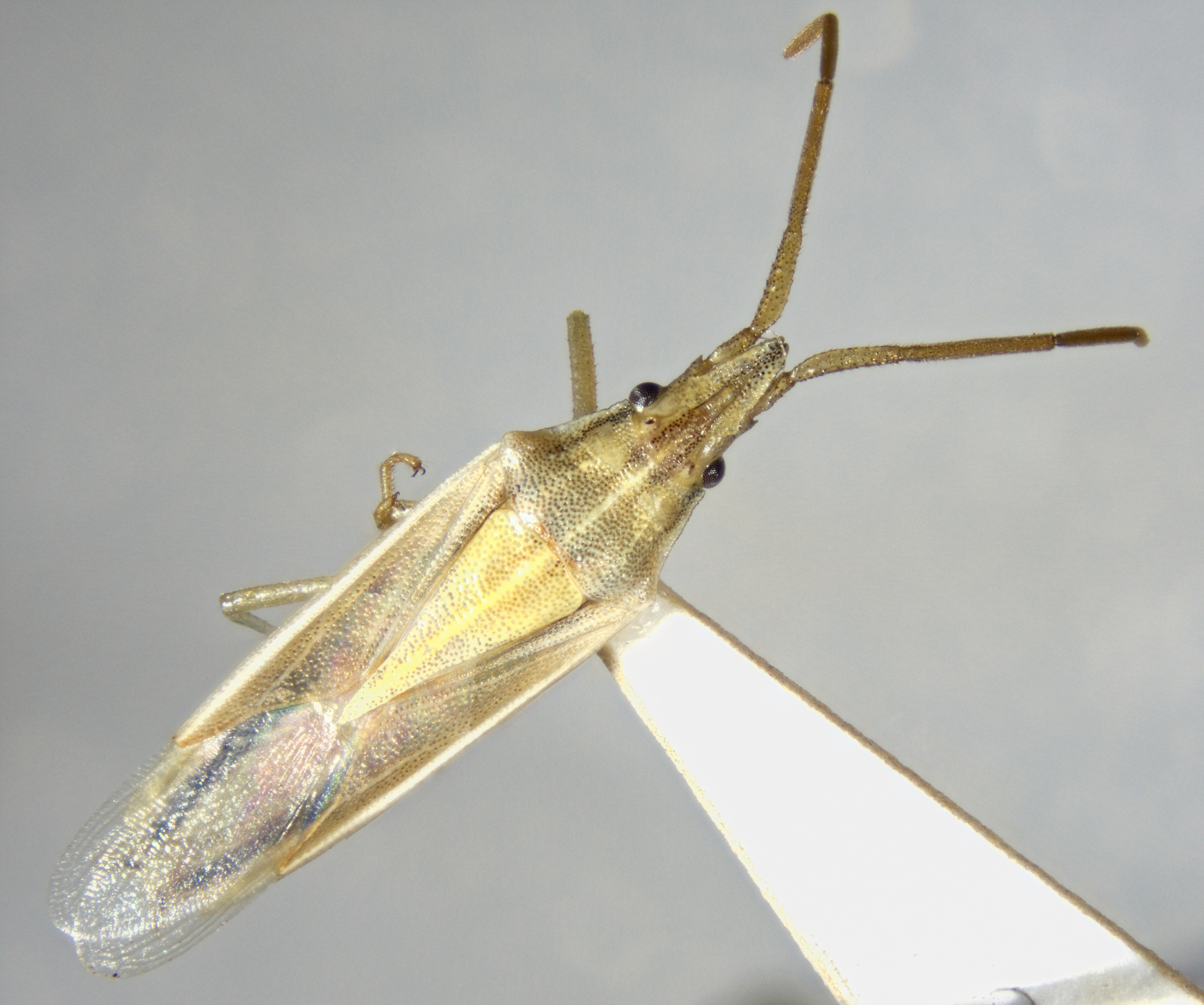

Scientific classification
- Domain: Eukaryota
- Kingdom: Animalia
- Phylum: Arthropoda
- Class: Insecta
- Order: Hemiptera
- Suborder: Heteroptera
- Family: Pentatomidae
- Tribe: Mecideini
- Genus: Mecidea
- Species: M. minor

Binomial name
- Mecidea minor Ruckes, 1946

= Mecidea minor =

Species of true bug

Mecidea minor is a species of stink bug in the family Pentatomidae. It is found in Central America and North America.
