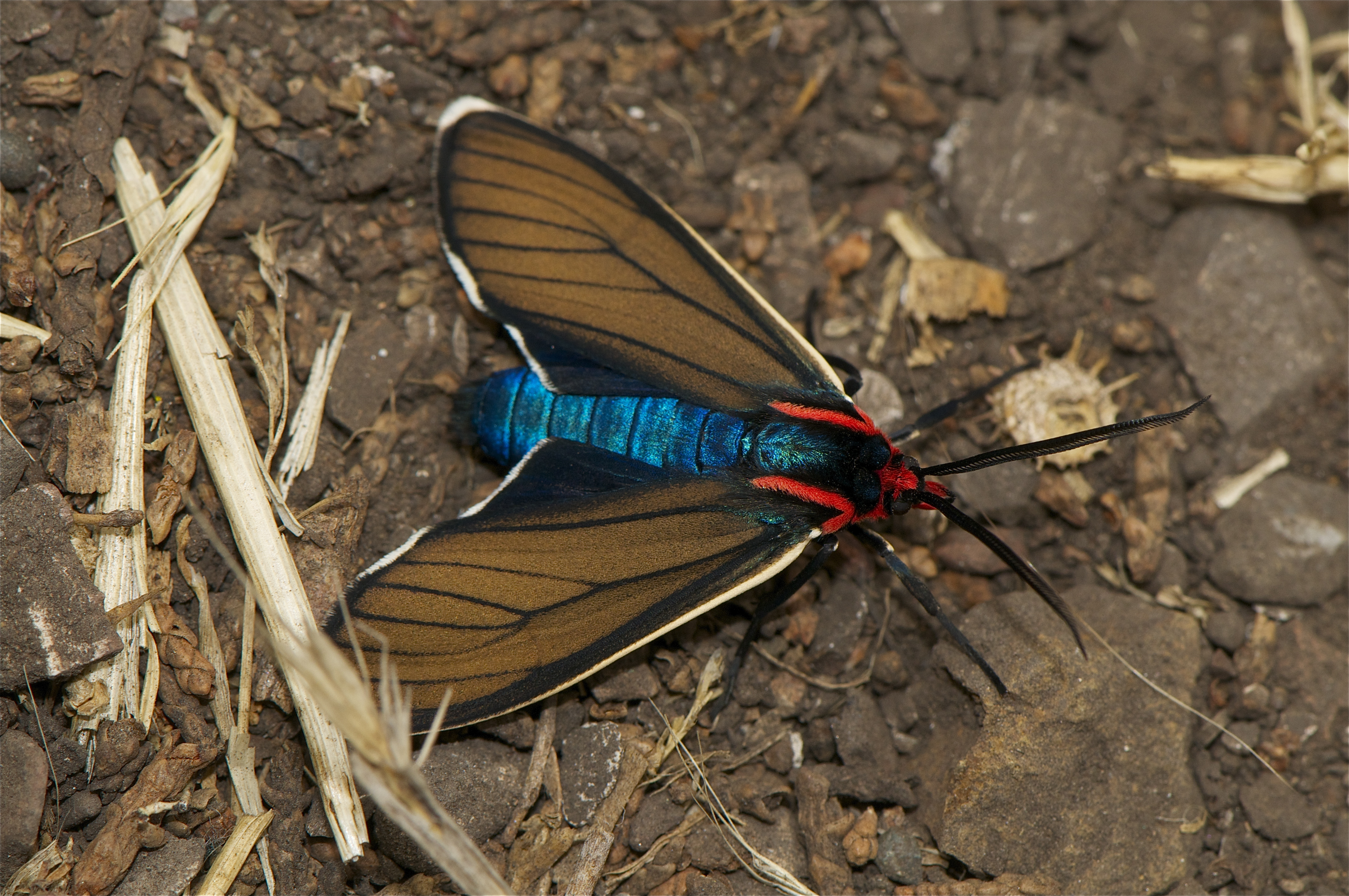
- Ctenucha brunnea

Scientific classification
- Domain: Eukaryota
- Kingdom: Animalia
- Phylum: Arthropoda
- Class: Insecta
- Order: Lepidoptera
- Superfamily: Noctuoidea
- Family: Erebidae
- Subfamily: Arctiinae
- Tribe: Arctiini
- Subtribe: Ctenuchina
- Genus: Ctenucha; Kirby, 1837

Synonyms
- Compsoprium Blanchard, 1852; Philoros Walker, 1854; Caralisa Walker, 1856; Euctenucha Grote, 1873; Philorus Zerny, 1912

= Ctenucha =

Genus of moths

Ctenucha (pronounced "ten-OOCH-ah") is a genus of moths in the family Erebidae.

== Etymology ==
The genus name Ctenucha was coined by William Kirby from the Greek meaning "having a comb", a reference to the showy antennae of some species.

== Species ==
- Ctenucha affinis Druce, 1884
- Ctenucha albipars
- Ctenucha andrei
- Ctenucha annulata
- Ctenucha aymara (Schaus, 1892)
- Ctenucha biformis
- Ctenucha braganza (Schaus, 1892)
- Ctenucha bruneri
- Ctenucha brunnea Stretch, 1872 – brown ctenucha, brown-winged ctenucha
- Ctenucha cajonata
- Ctenucha circe (Cramer, [1780])
- Ctenucha clavia (Druce, 1883)
- Ctenucha cressonana Grote, 1863 – Cresson's ctenucha
- Ctenucha cyaniris Hampson, 1898
- Ctenucha devisum (Walker, 1856)
- Ctenucha editha (Walker, 1856)
- Ctenucha fosteri
- Ctenucha garleppi
- Ctenucha hilliana
- Ctenucha laura (Hampson, 1898)
- Ctenucha manuela
- Ctenucha mennisata
- Ctenucha mortia
- Ctenucha multifaria (Walker, 1854) – California ctenucha
- Ctenucha nana
- Ctenucha nantana
- Ctenucha neglecta (Boisduval, 1832)
- Ctenucha palmeira (Schaus, 1892)
- Ctenucha pohli
- Ctenucha popayana
- Ctenucha projecta Dognin
- Ctenucha quadricolor (Walker, 1866)
- Ctenucha reducta
- Ctenucha refulgens
- Ctenucha reimoseri
- Ctenucha rubriceps Walker, 1854
- Ctenucha rubroscapus (Ménétriés, 1857) – red-shouldered ctenucha, Walsingham's ctenucha
- Ctenucha rubrovenata
- Ctenucha ruficeps Walker, 1854
- Ctenucha schausi
- Ctenucha semistria (Walker, 1854)
- Ctenucha signata
- Ctenucha subsemistria
- Ctenucha tapajoza
- Ctenucha togata (Druce, 1884)
- Ctenucha tucumana
- Ctenucha venosa Walker, 1854 – veined ctenucha
- Ctenucha virginica (Esper, 1794) – Virginia ctenucha
- Ctenucha vittigerum (Blanchard, 1852)
