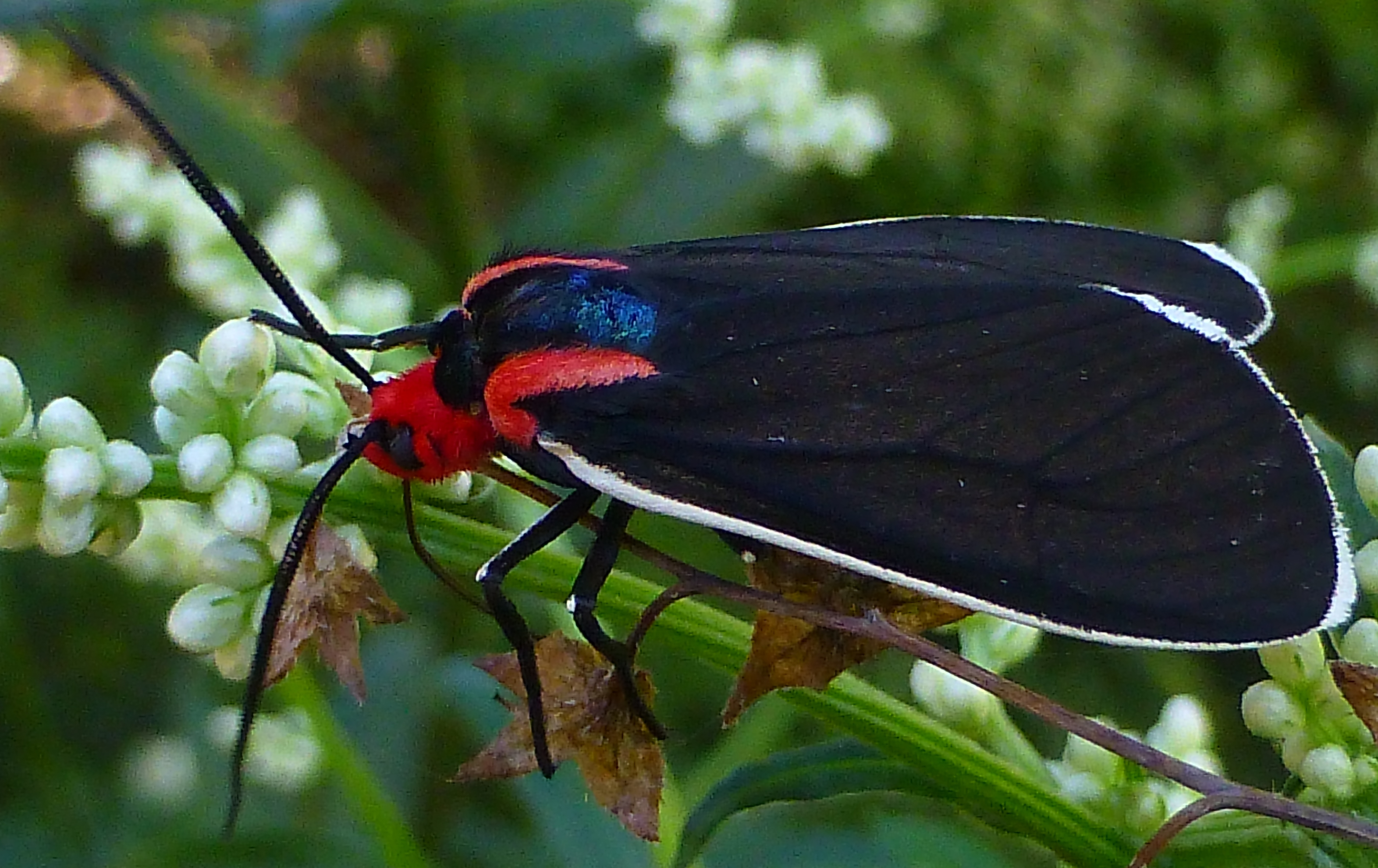

Scientific classification
- Kingdom: Animalia
- Phylum: Arthropoda
- Class: Insecta
- Order: Lepidoptera
- Superfamily: Noctuoidea
- Family: Erebidae
- Subfamily: Arctiinae
- Genus: Ctenucha
- Species: C. multifaria

Binomial name
- Ctenucha multifaria (Walker, 1854)

Synonyms
- Apistosia multifaria Walker, 1854; Ctenucha multifaria var. luteoscapus Neumoegen & Dyar, 1893

= Ctenucha multifaria =

Species of moth

Ctenucha multifaria is a moth of the family Erebidae. It was described by Francis Walker in 1854. It is found along the coast in the US states of California, north of the city of Santa Maria, and Oregon. This is a diurnal moth, meaning it is active during the day.

Adult C. multifaria is similar to the brown-winged ctenucha of southern California, but with black wings instead of brown. The body is blue and 20–26 millimetres (0.79–1.02 in) in length. Head and shoulder markings are red. The wingspan is 46–50 millimetres (1.8–2.0 in). Forewings are black with white margin.

Larvae are hairy, and the eventual cocoon is formed by these hairs.
