= Ctenucha nana =

Scientific classification
- Kingdom: Animalia
- Phylum: Arthropoda
- Class: Insecta
- Order: Lepidoptera
- Superfamily: Noctuoidea
- Family: Erebidae
- Subfamily: Arctiinae
- Genus: Ctenucha
- Species: C. nana

Binomial name
- Ctenucha nana E. D. Jones, 1914

Species of moth

Ctenucha nana is a moth of the family Erebidae first described by E. Dukinfield Jones in 1914. It is found in Brazil.
