= Ctenucha semistria =

Scientific classification
- Kingdom: Animalia
- Phylum: Arthropoda
- Class: Insecta
- Order: Lepidoptera
- Superfamily: Noctuoidea
- Family: Erebidae
- Subfamily: Arctiinae
- Genus: Ctenucha
- Species: C. semistria

Binomial name
- Ctenucha semistria (Walker, 1854)

Synonyms
- Dioptis semistria Walker, 1854

Species of moth

Ctenucha semistria is a moth of the family Erebidae. It was described by Francis Walker in 1854. It is found in Brazil.
