= Ctenucha devisum =

Scientific classification
- Kingdom: Animalia
- Phylum: Arthropoda
- Class: Insecta
- Order: Lepidoptera
- Superfamily: Noctuoidea
- Family: Erebidae
- Subfamily: Arctiinae
- Genus: Ctenucha
- Species: C. devisum

Binomial name
- Ctenucha devisum (Walker, 1856)

Synonyms
- Compsoprium devisum Walker, 1856; Philoros marita Schaus, 1896

Species of moth

Ctenucha devisum is a moth of the family Erebidae. It was described by Francis Walker in 1856. It is found in São Paulo in Brazil and in Argentina.
