= Ctenucha biformis =

Scientific classification
- Kingdom: Animalia
- Phylum: Arthropoda
- Class: Insecta
- Order: Lepidoptera
- Superfamily: Noctuoidea
- Family: Erebidae
- Subfamily: Arctiinae
- Genus: Ctenucha
- Species: C. biformis

Binomial name
- Ctenucha biformis Dognin, 1907

Synonyms
- Napata abbreviata Draudt, 1915

Species of moth

Ctenucha biformis is a moth of the family Erebidae. It is found in Peru and Bolivia.
