= Ctenucha editha =

Scientific classification
- Kingdom: Animalia
- Phylum: Arthropoda
- Class: Insecta
- Order: Lepidoptera
- Superfamily: Noctuoidea
- Family: Erebidae
- Subfamily: Arctiinae
- Genus: Ctenucha
- Species: C. editha

Binomial name
- Ctenucha editha (Walker, 1856)

Synonyms
- Caralisa editha Walker, 1856

Species of moth

Ctenucha editha is a moth of the family Erebidae. It was described by Francis Walker in 1856. It is found on Haiti.
