= Ctenucha clavia =

Scientific classification
- Kingdom: Animalia
- Phylum: Arthropoda
- Class: Insecta
- Order: Lepidoptera
- Superfamily: Noctuoidea
- Family: Erebidae
- Subfamily: Arctiinae
- Genus: Ctenucha
- Species: C. clavia

Binomial name
- Ctenucha clavia (H. Druce, 1883)

Synonyms
- Hoplarctia clavia H. Druce, 1883

Species of moth

Ctenucha clavia is a moth of the family Erebidae. It was described by Herbert Druce in 1883. It lives in Ecuador.
