= Ctenucha togata =

Scientific classification
- Kingdom: Animalia
- Phylum: Arthropoda
- Class: Insecta
- Order: Lepidoptera
- Superfamily: Noctuoidea
- Family: Erebidae
- Subfamily: Arctiinae
- Genus: Ctenucha
- Species: C. togata

Binomial name
- Ctenucha togata (H. Druce, 1884)

Synonyms
- Acreagris togata H. Druce, 1884; Lycomorpha augusta H. Edwards, 1887

Species of moth

Ctenucha togata is a moth of the family Erebidae. It was described by Herbert Druce in 1884. It is found in Mexico, Guatemala, Panama and Costa Rica.
