= Ctenucha pohli =

Scientific classification
- Kingdom: Animalia
- Phylum: Arthropoda
- Class: Insecta
- Order: Lepidoptera
- Superfamily: Noctuoidea
- Family: Erebidae
- Subfamily: Arctiinae
- Genus: Ctenucha
- Species: C. pohli

Binomial name
- Ctenucha pohli Schaus, 1921

Species of moth

Ctenucha pohli is a moth of the family Erebidae. It is found in Brazil.
