= Ctenucha braganza =

Scientific classification
- Kingdom: Animalia
- Phylum: Arthropoda
- Class: Insecta
- Order: Lepidoptera
- Superfamily: Noctuoidea
- Family: Erebidae
- Subfamily: Arctiinae
- Genus: Ctenucha
- Species: C. braganza

Binomial name
- Ctenucha braganza (Schaus, 1892)

Synonyms
- Melanchroia braganza Schaus, 1892

Species of moth

Ctenucha braganza is a moth of the family Erebidae. It was described by William Schaus in 1892. It is found in Rio de Janeiro, Brazil.
