= Ctenucha ruficeps =

Scientific classification
- Kingdom: Animalia
- Phylum: Arthropoda
- Class: Insecta
- Order: Lepidoptera
- Superfamily: Noctuoidea
- Family: Erebidae
- Subfamily: Arctiinae
- Genus: Ctenucha
- Species: C. ruficeps

Binomial name
- Ctenucha ruficeps Walker, 1854

Synonyms
- Ctenucha (Philorus) ruficeps Walker, 1854

Species of moth

Ctenucha ruficeps is a moth of the family Erebidae. It was described by Francis Walker in 1854. It is found in Mexico.
