= Ctenucha popayana =

Scientific classification
- Kingdom: Animalia
- Phylum: Arthropoda
- Class: Insecta
- Order: Lepidoptera
- Superfamily: Noctuoidea
- Family: Erebidae
- Subfamily: Arctiinae
- Genus: Ctenucha
- Species: C. popayana

Binomial name
- Ctenucha popayana Dognin, 1911

Species of moth

Ctenucha popayana is a moth of the family Erebidae. It is found in Colombia.
