= Ctenucha quadricolor =

Scientific classification
- Kingdom: Animalia
- Phylum: Arthropoda
- Class: Insecta
- Order: Lepidoptera
- Superfamily: Noctuoidea
- Family: Erebidae
- Subfamily: Arctiinae
- Genus: Ctenucha
- Species: C. quadricolor

Binomial name
- Ctenucha quadricolor (Walker, 1866)

Synonyms
- Charidea quadricolor Walker, 1866; Antichloris quadricolor; Philoros quadricolor

Species of moth

Ctenucha quadricolor is a moth of the family Erebidae. It was described by Francis Walker in 1866. It is found on Jamaica.
