= Ctenucha neglecta =

Scientific classification
- Kingdom: Animalia
- Phylum: Arthropoda
- Class: Insecta
- Order: Lepidoptera
- Superfamily: Noctuoidea
- Family: Erebidae
- Subfamily: Arctiinae
- Genus: Ctenucha
- Species: C. neglecta

Binomial name
- Ctenucha neglecta (Boisduval, 1832)

Synonyms
- Tipulodes neglecta Boisduval, 1832

Species of moth

Ctenucha neglecta is a moth of the family Erebidae. It was described by Jean Baptiste Boisduval in 1832. It is found in Peru.
