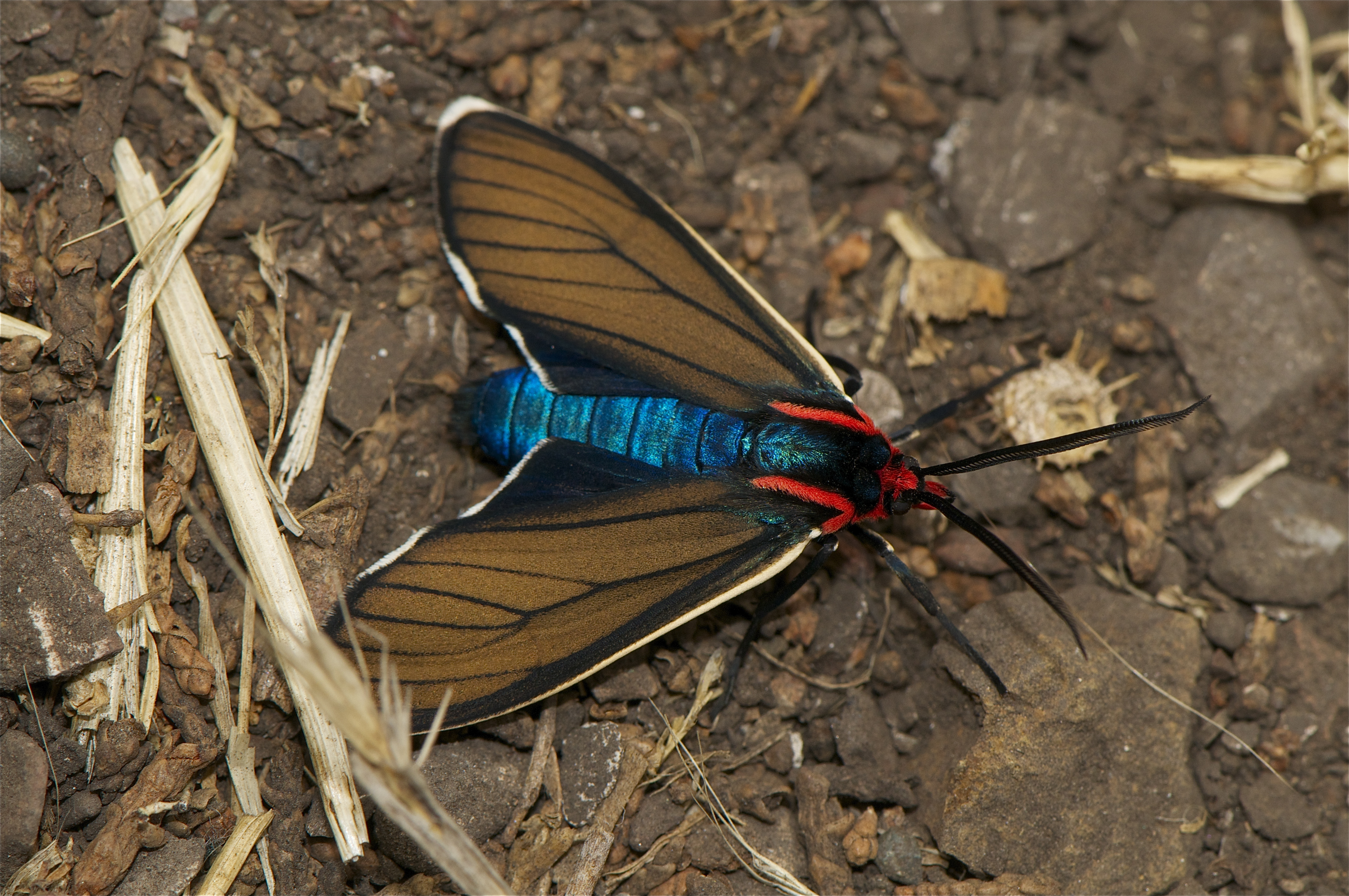

Scientific classification
- Kingdom: Animalia
- Phylum: Arthropoda
- Class: Insecta
- Order: Lepidoptera
- Superfamily: Noctuoidea
- Family: Erebidae
- Subfamily: Arctiinae
- Genus: Ctenucha
- Species: C. brunnea

Binomial name
- Ctenucha brunnea Stretch, 1872

= Ctenucha brunnea =

Species of moth

Ctenucha brunnea, the brown ctenucha or brown-winged ctenucha, is a moth of the family Erebidae. The species was first described by Richard Harper Stretch in 1872. It is a diurnal moth found in the US from central to southern coastal California. North of that, it is replaced by Ctenucha multifaria.

Adults' bodies are 20–26 millimetres (0.79–1.02 in) in length and blue, with red heads and shoulder markings. The length of the forewings is 18–20 millimetres (0.71–0.79 in). Adults are on wing from mid May to mid July. They feed on the nectar of Heteromeles arbutifolia.

Eggs are round and fade from white to yellow, and laid in rows. The larvae are black with buff-colored or yellow hairs, with two black tufts on the front and rear and an amber or orange head. They feed on Leymus condensatus and other grasses and sedges. The pupae are chestnut in color and wrapped loosely in a cocoon of the larval hairs.
