= Ctenucha albipars =

Scientific classification
- Kingdom: Animalia
- Phylum: Arthropoda
- Class: Insecta
- Order: Lepidoptera
- Superfamily: Noctuoidea
- Family: Erebidae
- Subfamily: Arctiinae
- Genus: Ctenucha
- Species: C. albipars

Binomial name
- Ctenucha albipars Hampson, 1901

Species of moth

Ctenucha albipars is a moth of the family Erebidae. It is found in Bolivia.
