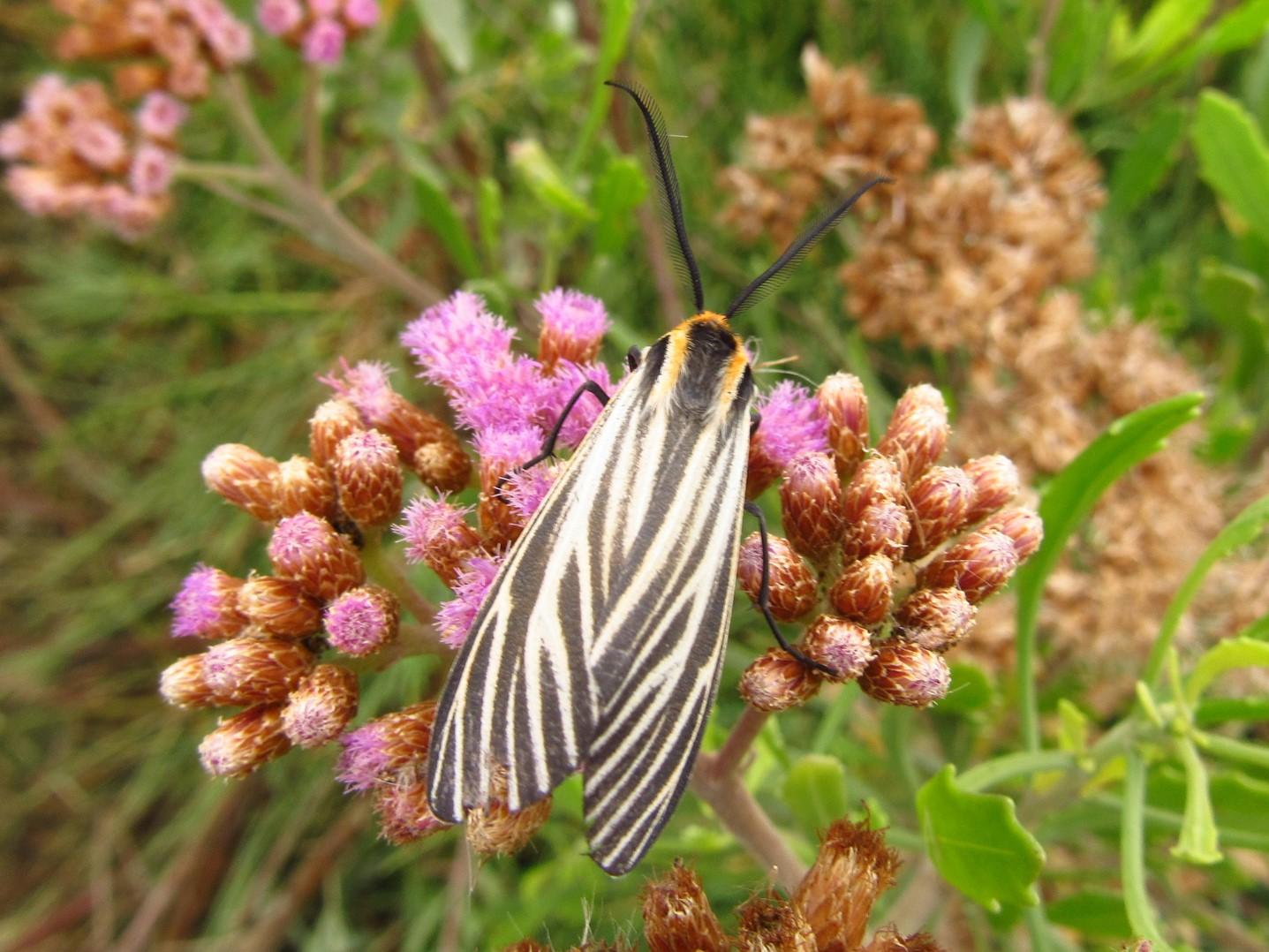

Scientific classification
- Kingdom: Animalia
- Phylum: Arthropoda
- Class: Insecta
- Order: Lepidoptera
- Superfamily: Noctuoidea
- Family: Erebidae
- Subfamily: Arctiinae
- Genus: Ctenucha
- Species: C. vittigerum

Binomial name
- Ctenucha vittigerum (Blanchard, 1852)

Synonyms
- Compsoprium vittigerum Blanchard, 1852; Ctenucha nivosa Walker, 1869

= Ctenucha vittigerum =

Species of moth

Ctenucha vittigerum is a moth of the family Erebidae. It was described by Émile Blanchard in 1852 and is found in Chile and Argentina.
