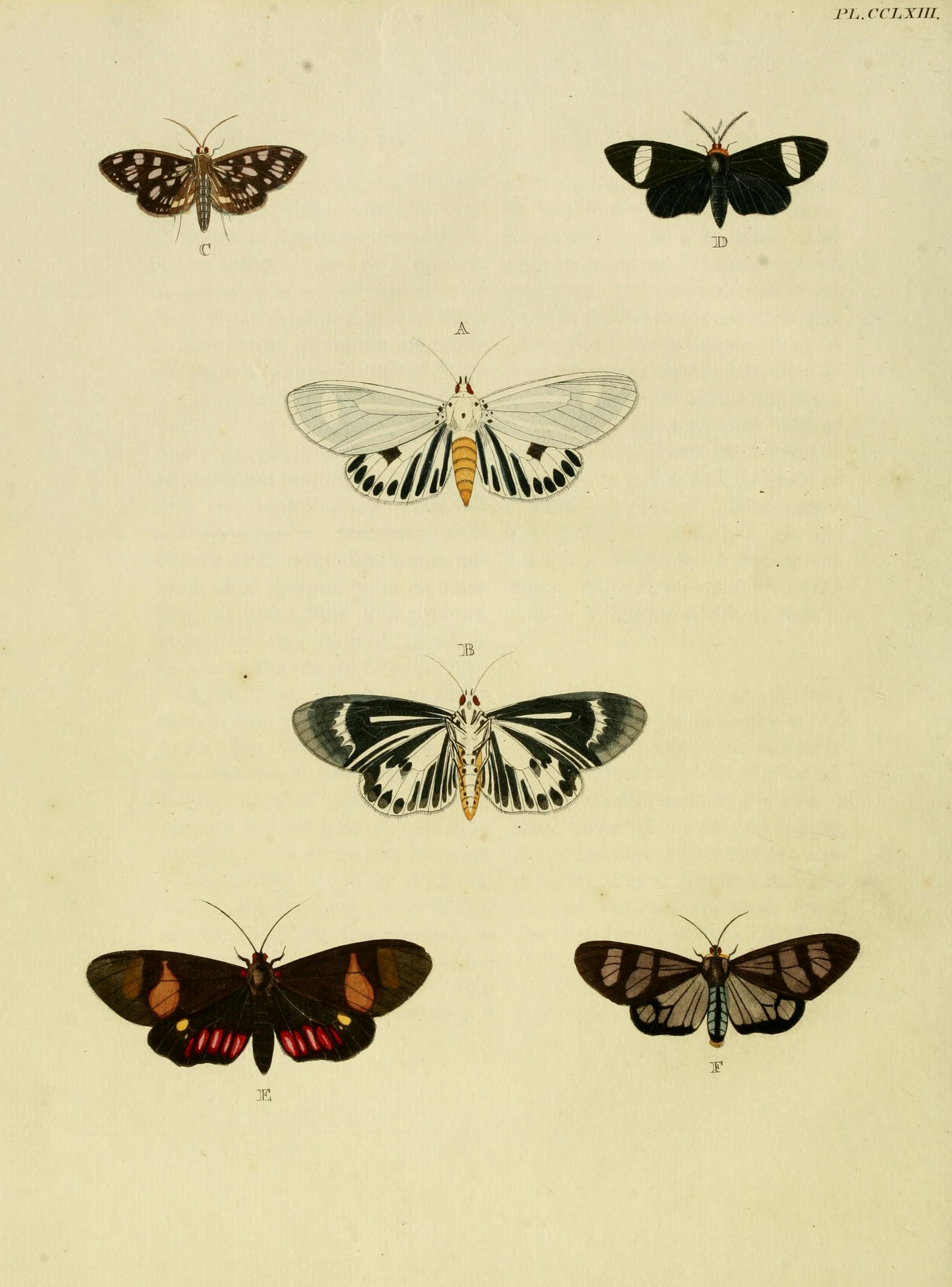
- Drawings of certain moths

Scientific classification
- Kingdom: Animalia
- Phylum: Arthropoda
- Class: Insecta
- Order: Lepidoptera
- Superfamily: Noctuoidea
- Family: Erebidae
- Subfamily: Arctiinae
- Genus: Ctenucha
- Species: C. circe

Binomial name
- Ctenucha circe (Cramer, [1780])

Synonyms
- Bombyx circe Cramer, [1780]; Iosia circe; Leucopsumis circe; Evagra affinis Boisduval, 1870

= Ctenucha circe =

Species of moth

Ctenucha circe is a moth of the family Erebidae. It was described by Pieter Cramer in 1780. It is found in Nicaragua, Ecuador, Venezuela and Brazil (Pará).
