= Ctenucha tucumana =

Scientific classification
- Kingdom: Animalia
- Phylum: Arthropoda
- Class: Insecta
- Order: Lepidoptera
- Superfamily: Noctuoidea
- Family: Erebidae
- Subfamily: Arctiinae
- Genus: Ctenucha
- Species: C. tucumana

Binomial name
- Ctenucha tucumana Rothschild, 1912

Species of moth

Ctenucha tucumana is a moth of the family Erebidae.
