= Ctenucha affinis =

Scientific classification
- Kingdom: Animalia
- Phylum: Arthropoda
- Class: Insecta
- Order: Lepidoptera
- Superfamily: Noctuoidea
- Family: Erebidae
- Subfamily: Arctiinae
- Genus: Ctenucha
- Species: C. affinis

Binomial name
- Ctenucha affinis H. Druce, 1884

Species of moth

Ctenucha affinis is a moth of the family Erebidae. It was described by Herbert Druce in 1884. It is found in Guatemala.
