= Ctenucha laura =

Scientific classification
- Kingdom: Animalia
- Phylum: Arthropoda
- Class: Insecta
- Order: Lepidoptera
- Superfamily: Noctuoidea
- Family: Erebidae
- Subfamily: Arctiinae
- Genus: Ctenucha
- Species: C. laura

Binomial name
- Ctenucha laura (Hampson, 1898)

Synonyms
- Philoros laura Hampson, 1898

Species of moth

Ctenucha laura is a moth of the family Erebidae. It was described by George Hampson in 1898. It is found in Bolivia.
