= Ctenucha rubrovenata =

Scientific classification
- Kingdom: Animalia
- Phylum: Arthropoda
- Class: Insecta
- Order: Lepidoptera
- Superfamily: Noctuoidea
- Family: Erebidae
- Subfamily: Arctiinae
- Genus: Ctenucha
- Species: C. rubrovenata

Binomial name
- Ctenucha rubrovenata Rothschild, 1912

Species of moth

Ctenucha rubrovenata is a moth of the family Erebidae.
