= Ctenucha rubriceps =

Scientific classification
- Kingdom: Animalia
- Phylum: Arthropoda
- Class: Insecta
- Order: Lepidoptera
- Superfamily: Noctuoidea
- Family: Erebidae
- Subfamily: Arctiinae
- Genus: Ctenucha
- Species: C. rubriceps

Binomial name
- Ctenucha rubriceps Walker, 1854

Synonyms
- Ctenucha (Philoros) rubriceps Walker, 1854; Ctenucha opaca Boisduval, 1870; Ctenucha scepsiformis H. Edwards, 1887

Species of moth

Ctenucha rubriceps is a moth of the family Erebidae. It was described by Francis Walker in 1854. It is found in Mexico, Guatemala, Costa Rica, Colombia, Venezuela, Brazil (São Paulo, Rio de Janeiro), Argentina and Uruguay.
