= Ctenucha reimoseri =

Scientific classification
- Kingdom: Animalia
- Phylum: Arthropoda
- Class: Insecta
- Order: Lepidoptera
- Superfamily: Noctuoidea
- Family: Erebidae
- Subfamily: Arctiinae
- Genus: Ctenucha
- Species: C. reimoseri

Binomial name
- Ctenucha reimoseri Zerny, 1912

Species of moth

Ctenucha reimoseri is a moth of the family Erebidae. It is found in Paraguay.
