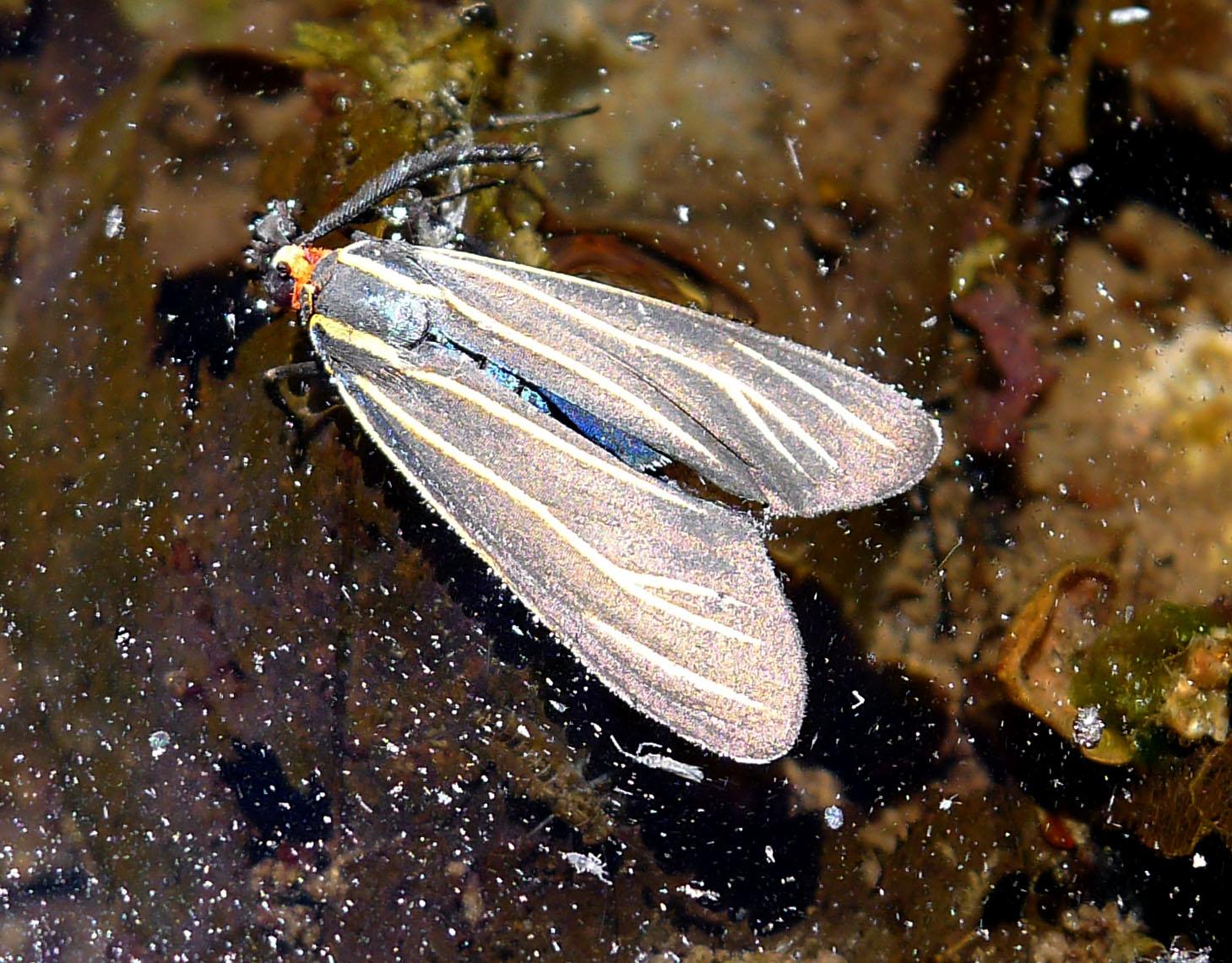

Scientific classification
- Kingdom: Animalia
- Phylum: Arthropoda
- Class: Insecta
- Order: Lepidoptera
- Superfamily: Noctuoidea
- Family: Erebidae
- Subfamily: Arctiinae
- Genus: Ctenucha
- Species: C. venosa

Binomial name
- Ctenucha venosa Walker, 1854

Synonyms
- Ctenucha (Philoros) venosa Walker, 1854; Ctenucha tigrina Strecker, 1899

= Ctenucha venosa =

Veined ctenucha moth

Species of moth

Ctenucha venosa, the veined ctenucha moth, is a moth of the family Erebidae. It was described by Francis Walker in 1854. It is found in the US from southern Nevada and Arizona to Colorado, Kansas, Oklahoma and Texas, as well as in Mexico, Guatemala, Panama and Venezuela.

The length of the forewings is 14–16 mm. There are several generations per year with adults on wing from April to November.

The larvae feed on various plants, including grasses. Notably, Bouteloua curtipendula (Sideoats grama).
