= Ctenucha reducta =

Scientific classification
- Kingdom: Animalia
- Phylum: Arthropoda
- Class: Insecta
- Order: Lepidoptera
- Superfamily: Noctuoidea
- Family: Erebidae
- Subfamily: Arctiinae
- Genus: Ctenucha
- Species: C. reducta

Binomial name
- Ctenucha reducta Rothschild, 1912

Synonyms
- Ctenucha reductana Strand, 1920; Ctenucha reductella Strand, 1920

Species of moth

Ctenucha reducta is a moth of the family Erebidae. It is found in Peru.
