= Ctenucha projecta =

Scientific classification
- Kingdom: Animalia
- Phylum: Arthropoda
- Class: Insecta
- Order: Lepidoptera
- Superfamily: Noctuoidea
- Family: Erebidae
- Subfamily: Arctiinae
- Genus: Ctenucha
- Species: C. projecta

Binomial name
- Ctenucha projecta Dognin, 1904

Synonyms
- Ctenucha albolineata Druce, 1904

Species of moth

Ctenucha projecta is a moth of the family Erebidae. It was described by Paul Dognin in 1904. It is found in Paraguay and Peru.
