= Ctenucha bruneri =

Scientific classification
- Kingdom: Animalia
- Phylum: Arthropoda
- Class: Insecta
- Order: Lepidoptera
- Superfamily: Noctuoidea
- Family: Erebidae
- Subfamily: Arctiinae
- Genus: Ctenucha
- Species: C. bruneri

Binomial name
- Ctenucha bruneri Schaus, 1938

Species of moth

Ctenucha bruneri is a moth of the family Erebidae. It is found on Cuba.
