= Ctenucha subsemistria =

Scientific classification
- Kingdom: Animalia
- Phylum: Arthropoda
- Class: Insecta
- Order: Lepidoptera
- Superfamily: Noctuoidea
- Family: Erebidae
- Subfamily: Arctiinae
- Genus: Ctenucha
- Species: C. subsemistria

Binomial name
- Ctenucha subsemistria Strand, 1915

Species of moth

Ctenucha subsemistria is a moth of the family Erebidae. It is found in Argentina.

The wingspan is about 32 mm.
