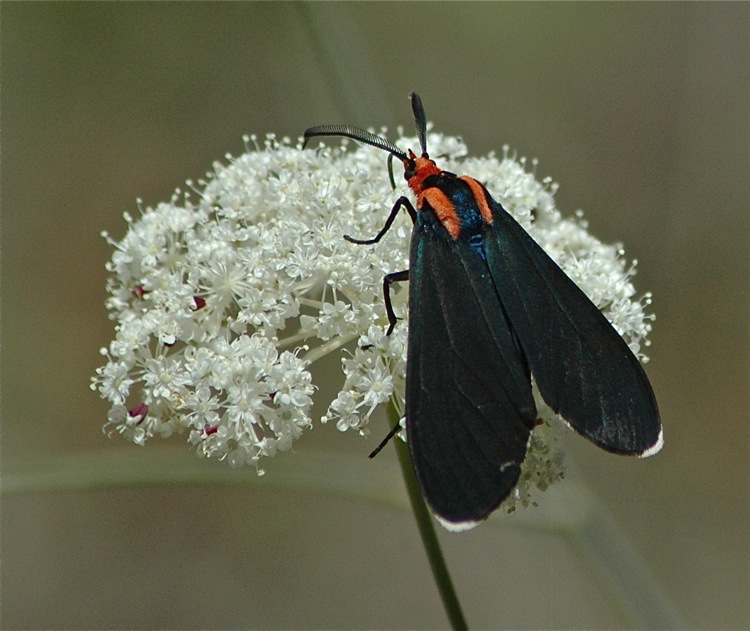

Scientific classification
- Kingdom: Animalia
- Phylum: Arthropoda
- Clade: Pancrustacea
- Class: Insecta
- Order: Lepidoptera
- Superfamily: Noctuoidea
- Family: Erebidae
- Subfamily: Arctiinae
- Genus: Ctenucha
- Species: C. rubroscapus

Binomial name
- Ctenucha rubroscapus (Ménétriés, 1857)

Synonyms
- Claucopis rubroscapus Ménétriés, 1857; Ctenucha ochroscapus Grote & Robinson, 1868; Ctenucha corvina Boisduval, 1869; Ctenucha walsinghamii H. Edwards, 1873

= Ctenucha rubroscapus =

Red-shouldered ctenucha moth

Species of moth

Ctenucha rubroscapus, the Red-shouldered ctenucha moth, or the White-tipped ctenucha, is a moth of the family Erebidae. It was described by Édouard Ménétries in 1857. It is found in western North America, limited to low elevations west of the Cascade Mountains, south of Chehalis in Washington.

== Adult ==
Adults fly at night in midsummer and prefer wet meadows where they feed on flowers. The length of the forewings is 19–20 mm. The adult moth has black wings, with white tips. The head is black and red. The thorax is black with two red longitudinal stripes. The prothorax has a red apical patch. The abdomen is iridescent blue.

== Caterpillar ==
The larva has white hair on a black body and an orange head. The larvae feed on grasses including Poaceae and Cyperaceae species, and species of the genera Dactylis and Elymus.

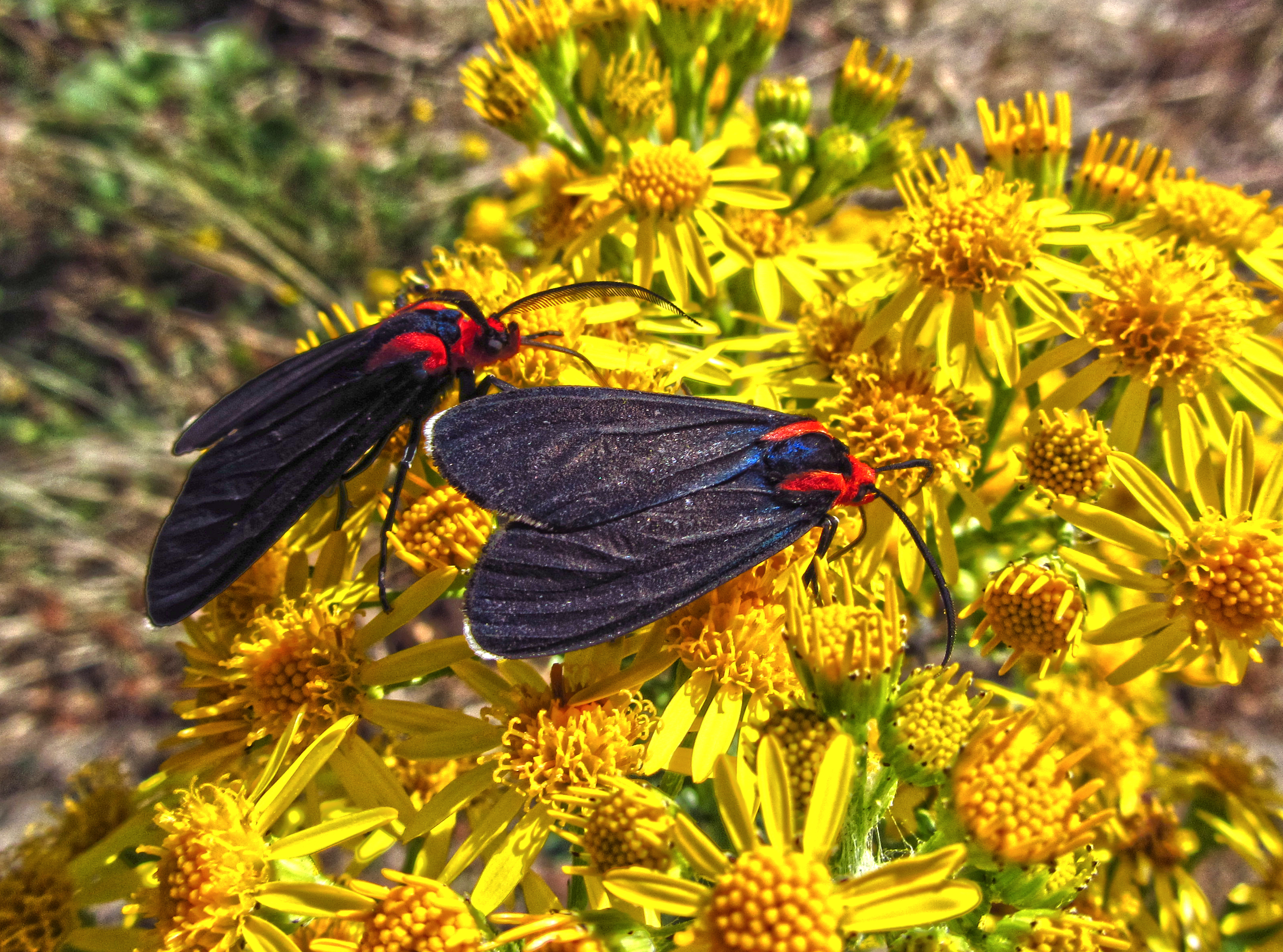
A pair of Red-shoulder ctenucha

Ctenucha rubroscapus larva

== External links and images ==
- Moth Photography Group
- Bug Guide
- iNaturalist
