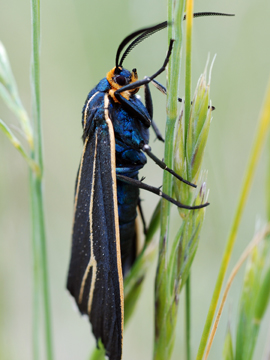

Scientific classification
- Kingdom: Animalia
- Phylum: Arthropoda
- Class: Insecta
- Order: Lepidoptera
- Superfamily: Noctuoidea
- Family: Erebidae
- Subfamily: Arctiinae
- Genus: Ctenucha
- Species: C. cressonana

Binomial name
- Ctenucha cressonana Grote, 1863

Synonyms
- Ctenucha sanguinaria Strecker, 1878; Ctenucha cressoana var. lutea Grote, 1902

= Ctenucha cressonana =

Cresson's ctenucha

Species of moth

Ctenucha cressonana, or Cresson's ctenucha, is a moth of the family Erebidae. The species was first described by Augustus Radcliffe Grote in 1863. It is found in the US Rocky Mountains, including Colorado and New Mexico.

The wingspan is about 45 mm.

The host plant is unknown, but adults have been observed laying eggs on blades of grass.
