= Ctenucha nantana =

Scientific classification
- Kingdom: Animalia
- Phylum: Arthropoda
- Class: Insecta
- Order: Lepidoptera
- Superfamily: Noctuoidea
- Family: Erebidae
- Subfamily: Arctiinae
- Genus: Ctenucha
- Species: C. nantana

Binomial name
- Ctenucha nantana (Walker, 1864)

Synonyms
- Ammalo nantana Walker, 1864; Ctenucha rubicunda Dognin, 1905

Species of moth

Ctenucha nantana is a moth of the family Erebidae. It is found in Peru.
