= Ctenucha annulata =

Scientific classification
- Kingdom: Animalia
- Phylum: Arthropoda
- Class: Insecta
- Order: Lepidoptera
- Superfamily: Noctuoidea
- Family: Erebidae
- Subfamily: Arctiinae
- Genus: Ctenucha
- Species: C. annulata

Binomial name
- Ctenucha annulata Schaus, 1904

Species of moth

Ctenucha annulata is a moth of the family Erebidae. It is found in Bolivia. Genus name Ctenucha was coined by William Kirby from the Greek meaning "having a comb", a reference to the showy antennae of some species.
