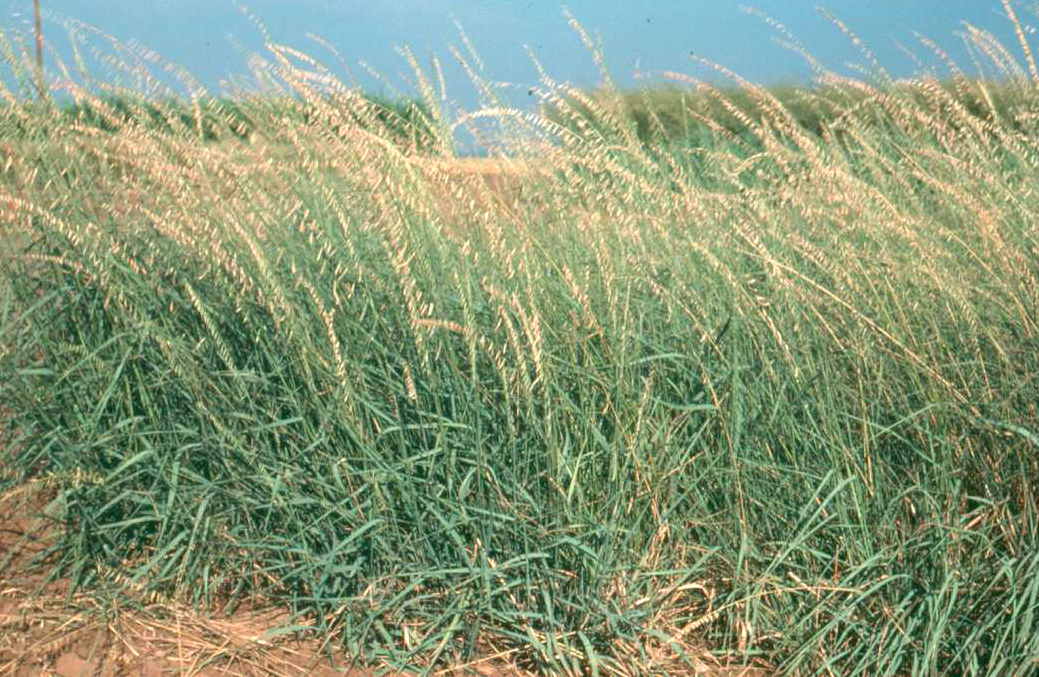

Scientific classification
- Kingdom: Plantae
- Clade: Tracheophytes
- Clade: Angiosperms
- Clade: Monocots
- Clade: Commelinids
- Order: Poales
- Family: Poaceae
- Subfamily: Chloridoideae
- Genus: Bouteloua
- Species: B. curtipendula

Binomial name
- Bouteloua curtipendula (Michx.) Torr.

Synonyms
- Synonymy: Chloris curtipendula Michx.; Andropogon curtipendulus (Michx.) Spreng. ex Steud.; Atheropogon curtipendulus (Michx.) E. Fourn.; Cynodon curtipendulus (Michx.) Raspail; Dinebra curtipendula (Michx.) P. Beauv.; Eutriana curtipendula (Michx.) Trin.; Atheropogon acuminatus E.Fourn.; Atheropogon affinis (Hook.f.) E.Fourn.; Atheropogon apludoides Willd.; Atheropogon racemosus (Lag.) Roem. & Schult.; Bouteloua acuminata (E.Fourn.) Griffiths; Bouteloua melicoides P.Beauv.; Bouteloua racemosa Lag.; Chloris secunda (Pursh) Eaton; Cynodon melicoides Raspail; Cynosurus secundus Pursh; Dineba melicoides P.Beauv.; Dinebra melicoides P.Beauv.; Dinebra secunda (Pursh) Roem. & Schult.; Erucaria glabra Cerv.; Eutriana affinis Hook.f.; Eutriana gracilis Hook.f. 1847 not (Kunth) Trin. 1824; Eutriana racemosa (Lag.) Trin. ex E.Fourn.; Heterostega curtipendula (Michx.) Schwein. ex Hook.f.; Melica curtipendula (Michx.) Steud.

= Bouteloua curtipendula =

Species of flowering plant

Bouteloua curtipendula, commonly known as sideoats grama, is a perennial, short prairie grass that is native throughout the temperate and tropical Western Hemisphere, from Canada south to Argentina.

The species epithet comes from Latin curtus "shortened" and pendulus "hanging".

== Description ==
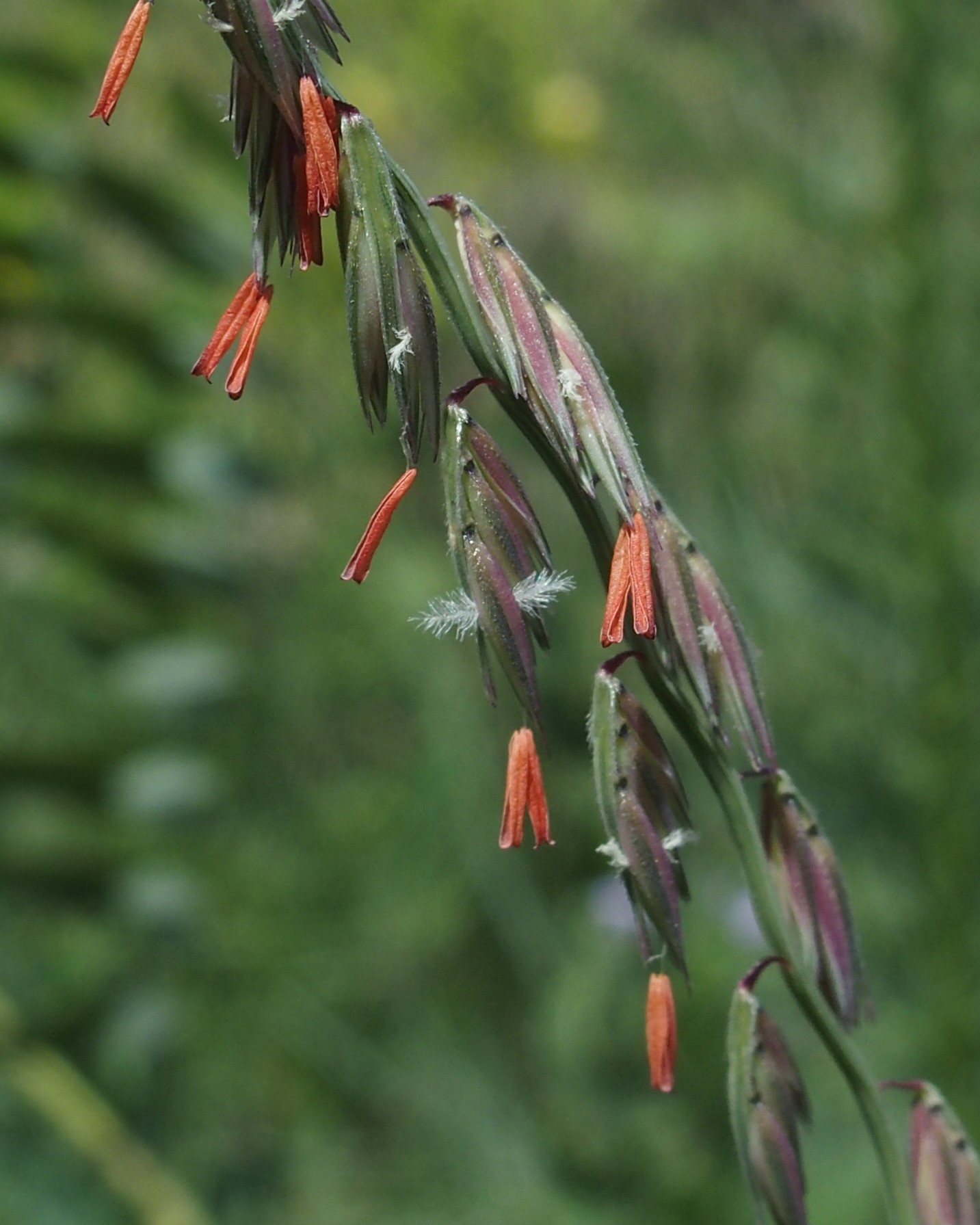
The pendulous spikes in bloom. The spike in the center has three spikelets visible, and the lowest spikelet is blooming, with orange stamens hanging below and feathery stigmas protruding horizontally.

Sideoats grama is a warm-season grass. The culms (flowering stems) are 30–100 cm (12–39 in) tall, and have alternate leaves that are concentrated at the bottom of the culm. The leaves are light green to blue-green in color, and up to 6 mm (1/4 in) across.

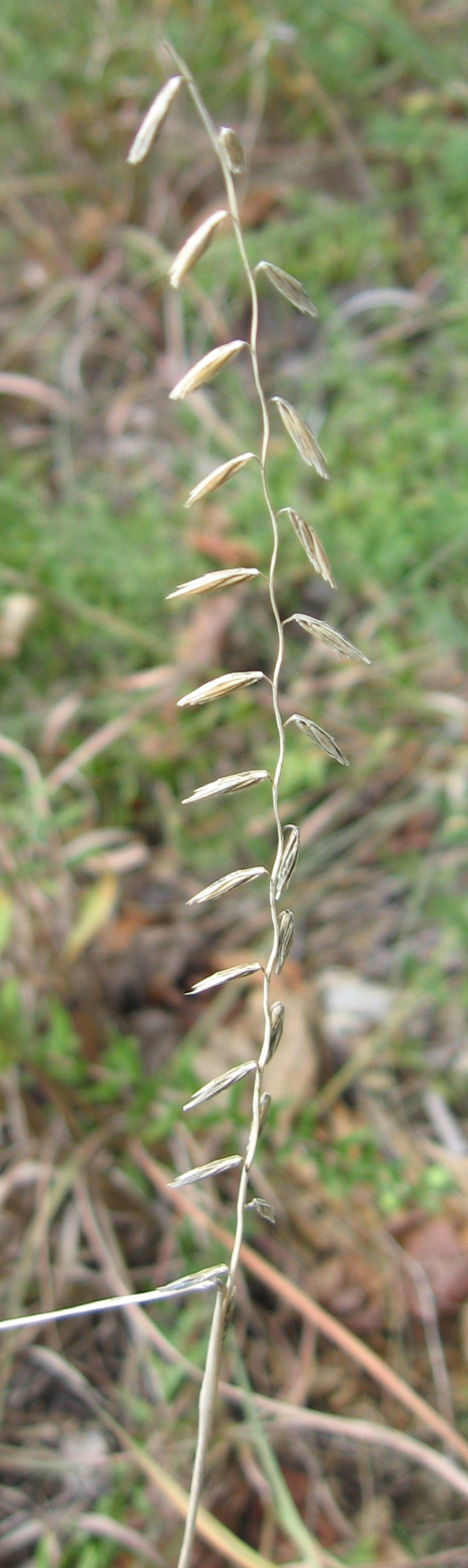
Alternately arranged spikes in a raceme

The flowers bloom in summer and autumn. They consist of compact spikes that hang alternately in a raceme along the top 15 to 25 cm (6 to 10 in) of the culm. The spikes often fall to one side of the stem, which gives the plant its name. There are 10–50 spikes per culm, and in each spike there are three to six spikelets, or rarely as many as 10. Each spikelet is 4.5 to 10 mm (3/16 to 13/32 in) long and consists of two glumes and two florets. One of the florets is fertile, and has colorful orange to brownish red anthers and feathery white stigmas during the blooming period, which contrasts with the pale green, pale red, greenish-red, or purple color of the spikes themselves.

After blooming, the spikes become straw-colored. The fertile florets produce seeds, and when they are ripe, the spikes fall to the ground.

== Distribution and habitat ==
Sideoats grama grows well on mountainous plateaus, rocky slopes, and sandy plains. It is drought- and cold-tolerant and is hardy in USDA hardiness zones 4–9 (average annual minimums of −30 to 25 °F, −34 to −4 °C).

== Ecology ==
It provides larval food for the veined ctenucha (Ctenucha venosa).

== Conservation ==
It is currently listed as a threatened species in the U.S. state of Michigan. It is considered as an endangered species in Connecticut.

== Uses ==
Sideoats grama is considered a good foraging grass for livestock. It is planted for erosion control.

== Cultivation ==
It is cultivated as an ornamental plant for native plant and drought-tolerant gardens.

== Culture ==
Sideoats grama is the state grass of Texas.
