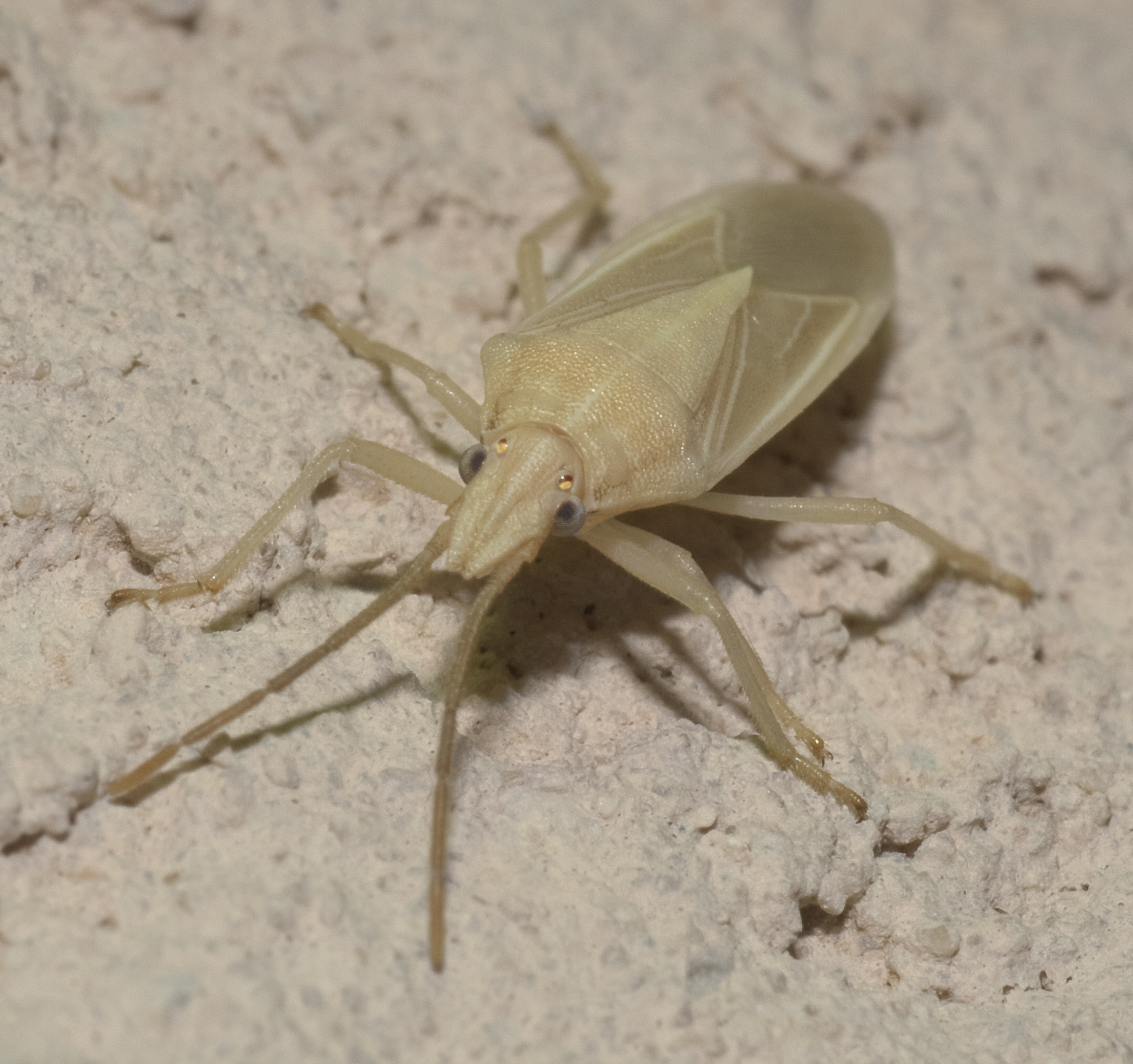
- Mecidea

Scientific classification
- Domain: Eukaryota
- Kingdom: Animalia
- Phylum: Arthropoda
- Class: Insecta
- Order: Hemiptera
- Suborder: Heteroptera
- Family: Pentatomidae
- Subfamily: Pentatominae
- Tribe: Mecideini; Distant, 1852

= Mecideini =

Tribe of true bugs

Mecideini is a tribe of stink bugs in the family Pentatomidae. There is at least one genus, Mecidea, in Mecideini.

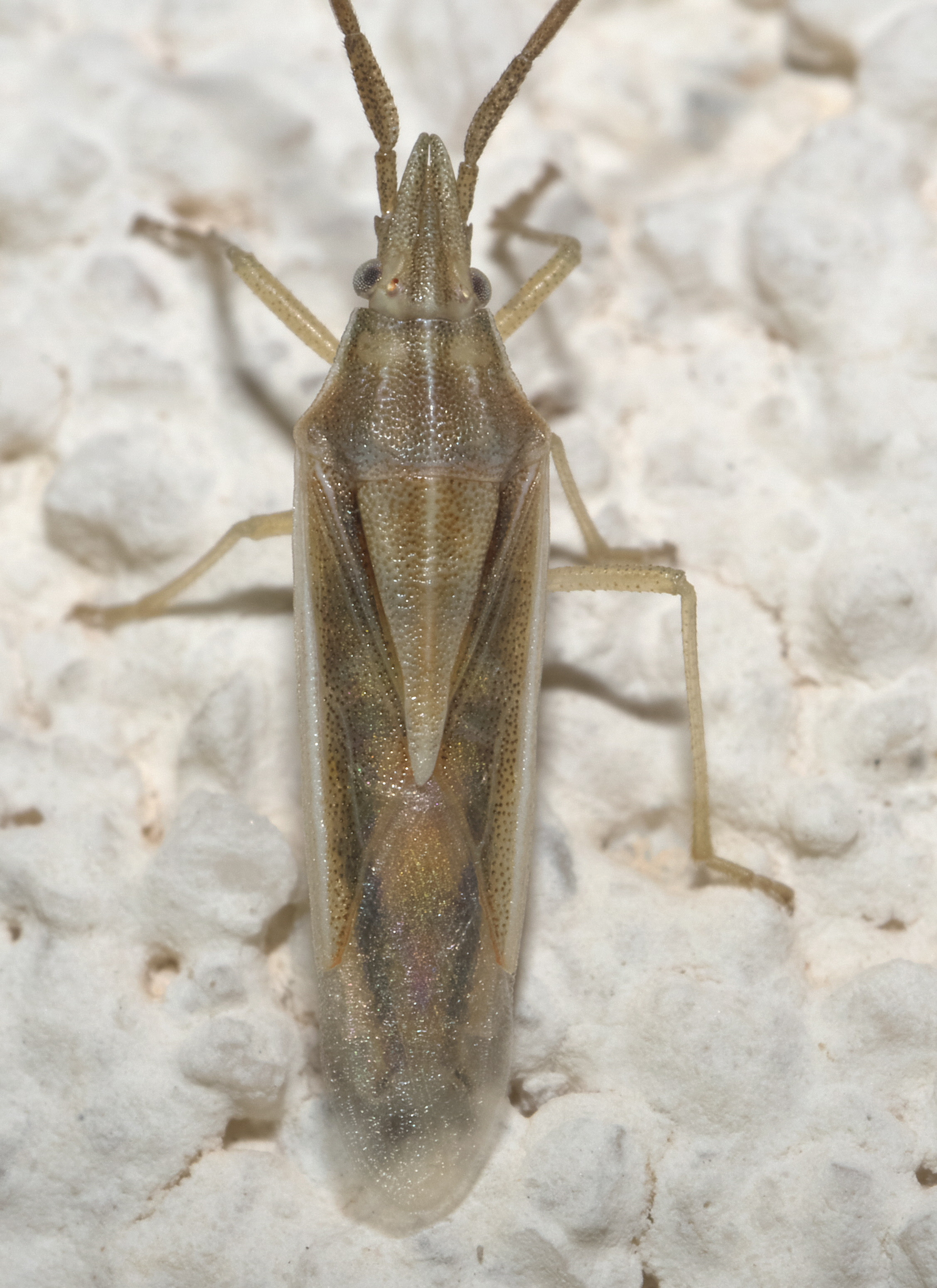
Mecidea
