= Hyda excelsa =

Scientific classification
- Domain: Eukaryota
- Kingdom: Animalia
- Phylum: Arthropoda
- Class: Insecta
- Order: Lepidoptera
- Superfamily: Noctuoidea
- Family: Erebidae
- Subfamily: Arctiinae
- Genus: Hyda
- Species: H. excelsa

Binomial name
- Hyda excelsa Rothschild, 1931

Species of moth

Hyda excelsa is a moth of the subfamily Arctiinae. It was described by Rothschild in 1931. It is found in Brazil.
