= Hyda basilutea =

Scientific classification
- Kingdom: Animalia
- Phylum: Arthropoda
- Class: Insecta
- Order: Lepidoptera
- Superfamily: Noctuoidea
- Family: Erebidae
- Subfamily: Arctiinae
- Genus: Hyda
- Species: H. basilutea

Binomial name
- Hyda basilutea (Walker, 1854)

Synonyms
- Glaucopis basilutea Walker, 1854; Hyalomis basilutea; Eurata xanthorrhina Herrich-Schäffer, [1854]; Eurata xanthorhina; Hyda xanthorrhina

Species of moth

Hyda basilutea is a moth of the subfamily Arctiinae. It was described by Francis Walker in 1854. It is found in Costa Rica, Colombia, Venezuela and Brazil.
