= List of Lepidoptera of Hispaniola =

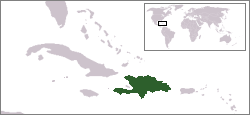
Location of Hispaniola

The Lepidoptera of Hispaniola consist of both the butterflies and moths recorded from the island of Hispaniola, comprising the two sovereign nations of Haiti and the Dominican Republic.

According to a recent estimate, there are about of 1,180 Lepidoptera species present on the island.

== Butterflies (Papilionoidea) ==
=== Papilionidae ===
==== Papilioninae ====
===== Leptocircini =====
- Protographium zonaria (Butler, 1869)

===== Papilionini =====
- Heraclides androgeus epidaurus (Godman & Salvin, 1890)
- Heraclides aristodemus aristodemus (Esper, 1794)
- Heraclides aristor (Godart, 1819)
- Heraclides machaonides (Esper, 1796)
- Heraclides pelaus imerius (Godart, 1824)
- Papilio demoleus Linnaeus, 1758

===== Troidini =====
- Battus polydamas polycrates (Hopffer, 1865)
- Battus zetides (Munroe, 1971)

=== Hesperiidae ===
==== Hesperiinae ====
- Argon sp.
- Atalopedes mesogramma apa Comstock, 1944
- Calpodes ethlius (Stoll, 1782)
- Choranthus haitensis Skinner, 1920
- Choranthus maria Minno, 1990
- Choranthus melissa Gali, 1983
- Choranthus schwartzi Gali, 1983
- Copaeodes stillmani (Bell & Comstock, 1948)
- Cymaenes tripunctus (Herrich-Schäffer, 1865)
- Euphyes singularis insolata (Butler, 1878)
- Hesperia nabokovi (Bell & Comstock, 1948)
- Hylephila phyleus (Drury, 1773)
- Nyctelius nyctelius nyctelius (Latreille, 1824)
- Ochlodes batesi (Bell, 1935)
- Panoquina ocola distipuncta Johnson & Matusik, 1988
- Perichares philetes philetes (Gmelin, 1790)
- Polites baracoa loma Evans, 1955
- Pyrrhocalles antiqua antiqua (Herrich-Schäffer, 1863)
- Rhinton bushi Watson, 1937
- Synapte malitiosa adoceta Schwartz & Sommer, 1986
- Wallengrenia otho druryi (Latreille, 1824)

==== Pyrginae ====
===== Eudamini =====
- Aguna asander haitensis (Mabille & Boullet, 1912)
- Astraptes anaphus anausis (Goodman & Salvin, 1896)
- Astraptes alardus heriul (Mabille & Boullet, 1912)
- Astraptes talus (Cramer, 1777)
- Astraptes xagua christyi (Sharpe, 1898)
- Cabares potrillo (Lucas, 1857)
- Chioides ixion (Plötz, 1880)
- Epargyreus spanna Evans, 1952
- Phocides pigmalion bicolor (Boddaert, 1783)
- Polygonus leo leo (Gmelin, 1790)
- Polythrix octomaculata (Ménétriés, 1855)
- Proteides mercurius sanchesi Bell & Comstock, 1948
- Urbanus dorantes cramptoni Comstock, 1944
- Urbanus proteus domingo (Scudder, 1872)

===== Pyrgini =====
- Achlyodes mithridates sagra Evans, 1953
- Anastrus sempiternus dilloni (Bell & Comstock, 1948)
- Burca hispaniolae Bell & Comstock, 1948
- Burca stillmani Bell & Comstock, 1948
- Ephyriades zephodes (Hübner, 1825)
- Erynnis zarucco (Lucas, 1857)
- Gesta gesta (Herrich-Schäffer, 1863)
- Pyrgus crisia Herrich-Schäffer, 1865
- Pyrgus oileus (Linnaeus, 1767)

=== Pieridae ===
==== Coliadinae ====
- Abaeis nicippe (Cramer, 1782)
- Abaeis nicippiformis (Munroe, 1947)
- Anteos clorinde (Godart, 1824)
- Anteos maerula (Fabricius, 1775)
- Aphrissa godartiana godartiana (Swainson, 1821)
- Aphrissa orbis browni (Munroe, 1947)
- Aphrissa statira hispaniolae (Munroe, 1947)
- Eurema daira palmira (Poey, 1852)
- Eurema elathea elathea (Cramer, 1777)
- Eurema priddyi priddyi (Lathy, 1898)
- Eurema nise larae (Herrich-Schäffer, 1862)
- Kricogonia lyside (Godart, 1819)
- Nathalis iole Boisduval, 1836
- Phoebis agarithe antillia Brown, 1929
- Phoebis argante rorata (Butler, 1869)
- Phoebis editha (Butler, 1870)
- Phoebis philea thalestris (Illiger, 1801)
- Phoebis sennae sennae (Linnaeus, 1758)
- Pyrisitia dina mayobanex (Bates, 1939)
- Pyrisitia euterpiformis (Munroe, 1947)
- Pyrisitia leuce memulus (Butler, 1871)
- Pyrisitia lisa euterpe (Ménétriés, 1832)
- Pyrisitia proterpia (Fabricius, 1775)
- Pyrisitia pyro (Godart, 1819)
- Rhabdodryas trite watsoni (Brown, 1929)
- Zerene cesonia cynops (Butler, 1873)

==== Dismorphiinae ====
- Dismorphia spio (Godart, 1819)

==== Pierinae ====
===== Pierini =====
- Ascia monuste eubotea (Godart, 1819)
- Ganyra josephina josephina (Godart, 1819)
- Glutophrissa drusilla boydi (Comstock, 1943)
- Glutophrissa punctifera (d'Almeida, 1939)
- Melete salacia salacia (Godart, 1819)

=== Lycaenidae ===
==== Polyommatinae ====
- Brephidium exilis isophthalma (Herrich-Schäffer, 1862)
- Cyclargus ammon noeli (Comstock & Huntington, 1943)
- Cyclargus kathleena Johnson & Matusik, 1992
- Cyclargus sorpresus Johnson & Matusik, 1992
- Hemiargus hanno ceraunus (Fabricius, 1793)
- Leptotes cassius theonus (Lucas, 1857)
- Leptotes perkinsae idealus Johnson & Matusik, 1988
- Pseudochrysops bornoi bornoi (Comstock & Huntington, 1943)

==== Theclinae ====
===== Eumaeini =====
- Allosmaitia coelebs (Herrich-Schäffer, 1862)
- Chlorostrymon maesites (Herrich-Schäffer, 1862)
- Chlorostrymon simaethis (Drury, 1773)
- Electrostrymon angelia (Hewitson, 1874)
- Electrostrymon minikyanos Johnson & Matusik, 1988
- Ministrymon azia (Hewitson, 1873)
- Nesiostrymon celida (Lucas, 1857)
- Rekoa bourkei (Kaye, 1924)
- Strymon acis (Drury, 1773)
- Strymon bazochii (Godart, 1824)
- Strymon christophei (Comstock & Huntington, 1943)
- Strymon columella (Fabricius, 1793)
- Strymon limenia (Hewitson, 1868)
- Strymon monopeteinus Schwartz & J. Y. Miller, 1985
- Strymon toussainti (Comstock & Huntington, 1943)

=== Riodinidae ===
- †Theope sp. (DeVries & Poinar, 1997 [Dominican amber])
- †Voltinia dramba Robbins & Harvey in Hall et al., 2004 [Dominican amber]

=== Nymphalidae ===
==== Apaturinae ====
- Asterocampa idyja idyja (Geyer, 1828)
- Doxocopa thoe (Godart, 1824)

==== Biblidinae ====
===== Cyrestini =====
- Marpesia chiron chiron (Fabricius, 1775)
- Marpesia eleuchea dospassosi Munroe, 1971

===== Biblidini =====
- Archimestra teleboas (Ménétriés, 1832)
- Biblis hyperia (Cramer, 1779)
- Eunica monima (Cramer, 1782)
- Eunica tatila tatilista Kaye, 1926
- Hamadryas amphichloe diasia (Fruhstorfer, 1916)
- Lucinia cadma torrebia (Ménétriés, 1832)
- Myscelia aracynthia (Dalman, 1823)

===== Dynaminini =====
- †Dynamine alexae Peñalver & Grimaldi, 2006 [Dominican amber]
- Dynamine serina zetes (Ménétriés, 1832)

==== Charaxinae ====
===== Anaeini =====
- Anaea troglodyta (Fabricius, 1775)
- Fountainea johnsoni (Avinoff & Shoumatoff, 1941)
- Memphis verticordia (Hübner, 1831)
- Siderone galanthis nemesis (Illiger, 1801)

===== Preponini =====
- Archaeoprepona demophoon insulicola (Godart, 1823)

==== Danainae ====
===== Euploeini =====
- Anetia briarea briarea (Godart, 1819)
- Anetia jaegeri (Ménétriés, 1832)
- Anetia pantheratus pantheratus (Martyn, 1797)
- Lycorea halia cleobaea (Godart, 1819)
- Lycorea halia halia (Hübner, 1816)

===== Danaini =====
- Danaus cleophile (Godart, 1819)
- Danaus eresimus tethys Forbes, 1944
- Danaus gilippus cleothera (Godart, 1819)
- Danaus plexippus megalippe (Hübner, 1826)

==== Heliconiinae ====
===== Argynnini =====
- Euptoieta claudia claudia (Cramer, 1779)
- Euptoieta hegesia hegesia (Cramer, 1779)

===== Heliconiini =====
- Agraulis vanillae insularis Maynard, 1889
- Dryas iulia fucatus (Boddaert, 1783)
- Eueides isabella melphis (Godart, 1819)
- Heliconius charitonia churchi Comstock & Brown, 1950

==== Ithomiinae ====
===== Godyridini =====
- Greta diaphanus quisqueya (Fox, 1963)

==== Libytheinae ====
- Libytheana terena (Godart, 1819)

==== Limenitidinae ====
- Adelpha fessonia lapitha Hall, 1929
- Adelpha gelania gelania (Godart, 1824)

==== Nymphalinae ====
===== Coeini =====
- Colobura dirce wolcotti (Comstock, 1942)
- Historis acheronta semele (Bates, 1939)
- Historis odius odius (Fabricius, 1775)

===== Kallimini =====
- Anartia jatrophae saturata Staudinger, 1884
- Anartia lytrea (Godart, 1819)
- Hypolimnas misippus (Linnaeus, 1764)
- Junonia evarete (Cramer, 1779)
- Junonia genoveva (Cramer, 1780)
- Siproeta stelenes stelenes (Linnaeus, 1758)

===== Nymphalini =====
- Hypanartia paullus (Fabricius, 1793)
- Vanessa atalanta rubria (Fruhstorfer, 1909)
- Vanessa cardui (Linnaeus, 1758)
- Vanessa virginiensis (Drury, 1773)

===== Melitaeini =====
- Antillea pelops pelops (Drury, 1773)
- Anthanassa frisia (Poey, 1832)
- Atlantea cryptadia Sommer & Schwartz, 1980

==== Satyrinae ====
===== Satyrini =====
- Calisto ainigma Johnson, Quinter & Matusik, 1987
- Calisto aleucosticha Correa & Schwartz, 1986
- Calisto amazona Gonzalez, 1987:6. Schwartz, 1989
- Calisto arcas Bates, 1939:48. Schwartz, 1989
- Calisto archebates (Ménétriés, 1832)
- Calisto batesi Clench, 1943
- Calisto chrysaoros Bates, 1935
- Calisto clenchi Schwartz & Gali, 1984
- Calisto clydoniata Schwartz & Gali, 1984
- Calisto confusa Lathy, 1899
- Calisto crypta Gali, 1985
- Calisto dystacta Gonzalez, 1987
- Calisto eleleus Bates, 1935
- Calisto franciscoi Gali, 1985
- Calisto galii choneupsilon Schwartz, 1985
- Calisto galii galii Schwartz, 1983
- Calisto gonzalezi Schwartz, 1988
- Calisto grannus dilemma Gonzalez, 1987
- Calisto grannus grannus Bates, 1939
- Calisto hysius (Godart, 1819)
- Calisto loxias Bates, 1935
- Calisto lyceius Bates, 1935
- Calisto micheneri Clench, 1944
- Calisto micrommata Schwartz & Gali, 1984
- Calisto montana Clench, 1943
- Calisto neiba Schwartz & Gali, 1984
- Calisto neochma Schwartz, 1991
- Calisto obscura Michener, 1943
- Calisto pauli Johnson & Hedges, 1998
- Calisto phoinix Gonzalez, 1987
- Calisto pulchella darlingtoni Clench, 1943
- Calisto pulchella pulchella Lathy, 1899
- Calisto raburni Gali, 1985
- Calisto schwartzi Gali, 1985
- Calisto sommeri Schwartz & Gali, 1984
- Calisto tasajera Gonzalez et al., 1991
- Calisto thomasi Johnson & Hedges, 1998
- Calisto tragius Bates, 1935
- Calisto wetherbeei Schwartz & Gonzalez, 1988
- Calisto woodsi Johnson & Hedges, 1998

== Moths ==
=== Nepticuloidea ===
==== Opostegidae ====
- Pseudopostega venticola (Walsingham, 1897)

=== Incurvarioidea ===
==== Heliozelidae ====
- Heliozela ahenea Walsingham, 1897

=== Carposinoidea ===
==== Carposinidae ====
- Carposina bullata Meyrick, 1913

=== Tineoidea ===
==== Acrolophidae ====
- Acrolophus arcasalis (Walker, 1858)
- Acrolophus australis (Walsingham, 1897)
- Acrolophus indecora (Walker, 1863)
- Acrolophus occultum (Walsingham, 1897)
- †Acrolophus sp. (Grimaldi & Engel, 2005) [Dominican amber]
- Acrolophus umbratipalpis (Walsingham, 1891)

==== Tineidae ====
- Lepyrotica fragilella (Walsingham, 1897)
- Opogona simplex (Walsingham, 1897)
- Protodarcia tischeriella (Walsingham, 1897)
- Tinea cretella Walsingham, 1897
- Tinea familiaris Zeller, 1877

==== Psychidae ====
===== Oiketicinae =====
- Oiketicus kirbyi Guilding, 1827

===== Penestoglossinae =====
- Pterogyne insularis Davis, 1975

===== Psychinae =====
- Cryptothelea watsoni (F. M. Jones, 1923)
- Lumacra haitiensis Davis, 1964
- Paucivena hispaniolae Davis, 1975
- Thyridopteryx ephemeraeformis (Haworth, 1803)

==== Gracillariidae ====
===== Gracillariinae =====
- Acrocercops undifraga Meyrick, 1931
- Dialectica permixtella Walsingham, 1897
- Dialectica sanctaecrucis Walsingham, 1897
- Eucosmophora dives Walsingham, 1897
- Parectopa pulverella (Walsingham, 1897)
- Parectopa undosa (Walsingham, 1897)

===== Phyllocnistinae =====
- Phyllocnistis citrella Stainton, 1856

=== Urodoidea ===
==== Urodidae ====
- Urodus mirella (Möschler, 1890)

=== Gelechioidea ===
==== Oecophoridae ====
===== Depressariinae =====
- Gonionota rosacea (Forbes, 1931)

===== Ethmiinae =====
- Ethmia abraxasella abraxasella (Walker, 1864)
- Ethmia confusella (Walker, 1863)
- Ethmia kirbyi (Möschler, 1890)
- Ethmia nivosella (Walker, 1864)
- Ethmia notatella (Walker, 1863)
- Ethmia paucella (Walker, 1863)

===== Stenomatinae =====
- Cerconota anonella (Sepp, 1852)

==== Gelechiidae ====
===== Anacampsinae =====
- Pectinophora gossypiella (Saunders, 1844)
- Sitotroga cerealella (Olivier, 1789)

===== Dichomerinae =====
- Cymotricha melissia (Walsingham, 1911)
- Dichomeris sp.

===== Gelechiinae =====
- Aristotelia penicillata (Walsingham, 1897)
- Aristotelia pudibundella (Zeller, 1873)
- Aristotelia trossulella Walsingham, 1897
- Keiferia lycopersicella (Walsingham, 1897)
- Phthorimea operculella (Zeller, 1873)
- Recurvaria kittella (Walsingham, 1897)
- Stegasta capitella (Fabricius, 1794)
- Telphusa perspicua (Walsingham, 1897)
- Thiotricha godmani (Walsingham, 1892)
- Tildenia gudmannella (Walsingham, 1897)

==== Choreutidae ====
===== Choreutinae =====
- Hemerophila biferana Walker, 1863
- Tortyra auriferalis Walker, 1863

==== Bratrachedridae ====
===== Bratrachedinae =====
- Homaledra sabalella (Chambers, 1880)

==== Agonoxenidae ====
- Pammeces lithochroma Walsingham, 1897
- Pammeces picticornis (Walsingham, 1897)

==== Cosmopterigidae ====
===== Cosmopteriginae =====
- †?Anoncia sp. (Poinar & Poinar, 1999) [Dominican amber]
- Cosmopteryx abnormalis Walsingham, 1897
- Cosmopterix attenuatella (Walker, 1864)
- Pyroderces rileyi (Walsingham, 1882)
- †?Pyroderces sp. (Poinar & Poinar, 1999) [Dominican amber]

=== Yponomeutoidea ===
==== Heliodinidae ====
- Embola melanotela Hsu in Hsu & Powell, 2005

==== Plutellidae ====
- Plutella xylostella (Linnaeus, 1758)

==== Yponomeutidae ====
===== Attevinae =====
- Atteva siderea (Walsingham, 1891)

==== Lyonetiidae ====
===== Bucculatriginae =====
- Perileucoptera coffeella (Guérin-Méneville, 1842)

===== Cemiostominae =====
- Bucculatrix thurberiella (Busck, 1914)

=== Hyblaeoidea ===
==== Hyblaeidae ====
- Hyblaea puera (Cramer, 1777)

=== Pyraloidea ===
==== Thyrididae ====
===== Striglininae =====
- Banisia furva illicta Whalley, 1976

==== Crambidae ====
===== Acentropinae =====
- Chrysendeton claudialis (Walker, 1859)
- Petrophila gratalis (Walker, 1865)
- Petrophila insulalis (Walker, 1862)
- Petrophila malcusalis (Schaus, 1924)

===== Crambinae =====
- Diatraea crambidoides (Grote, 1880)
- Diatraea saccharalis (Fabricius, 1794)
- Fissicrambus fissiradiellus (Walker, 1863)
- Fissicrambus haytiellus (Zincken, 1821)
- Mesolia plurimella (Walker, 1863)
- Microcrambus discludellus (Möschler, 1890)
- Microcrambus francescellus (Schaus, 1922)
- Microcrambus podalirius Błeszyński, 1967
- Prionapteryx eugraphis (Walker, 1863)

===== Evergestinae =====
- Trischistognatha pyrenealis (Walker, 1859)

===== Glaphyriinae =====
- Alatuncusia canalis (Walker, 1866)
- Dichogama decoralis (Walker, 1865)
- Hellula phidilealis (Walker, 1859)
- Hellula rogatalis (Hulst, 1886)

===== Odontiinae =====
- Cliniodes nacrealis Munroe, 1964
- Mimoschinia rufofascialis (Stephens, 1834)

===== Pyraustinae =====
- Achyra bifidalis (Fabricius, 1794)
- Achyra rantalis (Guenée, 1854)
- Agathodes designalis Guenée, 1854
- Apogeshna acestealis (Walker, 1859)
- Arthromastix lauralis Walker, 1859
- Asciodes gordialis Guenée, 1854
- Azochis rufidiscalis Hampson, 1904
- Bicilia iarchasalis (Walker, 1859)
- Bocchoropsis pharaxalis Walker, 1859
- Ceratoclasis delimitalis (Guenée, 1854)
- Conchylodes diphteralis (Geyer, 1832)
- Conchylodes hebraealis Guenée, 1854
- Conchylodes hedonialis (Walker, 1859)
- Cyclocena lelex (Cramer, 1777)
- Desmia funeralis (Hübner, 1796)
- Desmia niveiciliata E. Hering, 1906
- Desmia ploralis (Guenée, 1854)
- Desmia ufeus (Cramer, 1777)
- Diacme adipaloides (Grote & Robinson, 1867)
- Diaphania antillia Munroe, 1960
- Diaphania busccalis (Schaus, 1920)
- Diaphania costata (Fabricius, 1794)
- Diaphania elegans (Möschler, 1890)
- Diaphania glauculalis (Guenée, 1854)
- Diaphania hyalinata (Linnaeus, 1767)
- Diaphania indica (Saunders, 1851)
- Diaphania lualis (Herrich-Schäffer, 1871)
- Diaphania nitidalis (Cramer, 1781)
- Diaphania quadristigmalis (Guenée, 1854)
- Diaphantania candacalis (Felder & Rogenhofer, 1875)
- Diaphantania ceresalis (Walker, 1859)
- Epicorsia oedipodalis (Guenée, 1854)
- Ercta vittata (Fabricius, 1794)
- Eulepte gastralis (Guenée, 1854)
- Glyphodes sibillalis sibillalis Walker, 1859
- Helvibotys carnifex (Felder & Rogenhofer, 1875)
- Helvibotys panopealis (Walker, 1859)
- Herpetogramma agavealis (Walker, 1859)
- Herpetogramma antillalis (Schaus, 1920)
- Herpetogramma bipunctalis (Fabricius, 1794)
- Herpetogramma phaeopteralis (Guenée, 1854)
- Hileithia magualis (Guenée, 1854)
- Hymenia perspectalis (Hübner, 1796)
- Lamprosema pelealis (Walker, 1859)
- Lygropia imparalis (Walker, 1865)
- Lygropia tripunctata (Fabricius, 1794)
- Mabra russoi Schaus in Russo, 1940
- Marasmia cochrusalis (Walker, 1859)
- Marasmia trapezalis (Guenée, 1854)
- Maruca testulalis (Geyer, 1832)
- Maruca vitrata (Fabricius, 1787)
- Microthyris anormalis (Guenée, 1854)
- Neoleucinodes imperialis (Guenée, 1854)
- Nomophila nearctica Munroe, 1973
- Omiodes humeralis Guenée, 1854
- Omiodes indicata (Fabricius, 1775)
- Omiodes simialis Guenée, 1854
- Ommatospila descriptalis (Walker, 1865)
- Ommatospila narcaeusalis (Walker, 1859)
- Palpita flegia (Cramer, 1777)
- Palpita quadistrigmalis (Guenée, 1854)
- Palpita kimballi Munroe, 1959
- Palpita viettei Munroe, 1959
- Pantographa prorogata (Hampson, 1912)
- Phaedropsis domingalis (Schaus, 1920)
- Phaedropsis hecalialis (Walker, 1859)
- Phaedropsis stictigramma (Hampson, 1912)
- Pilemia periusalis (Walker, 1859)
- Pleuroptya silicalis (Guenée, 1854)
- Polygrammodes elevata (Fabricius, 1794)
- Proleucinodes impuralis (Felder & Rogenhofer, 1875)
- Psara dryalis (Walker, 1859)
- Pyrausta carnifex (Felder, 1860)
- Pyrausta tyralis (Guenée, 1854)
- Salbia haemorrhoidalis Guenée, 1854
- Samea multiplicalis (Guenée, 1854)
- Sathria internitalis (Guenée, 1854)
- Spoladea recurvalis (Fabricius, 1775)
- Syllepte opalisans (Felder & Rogenhofer, 1875)
- Syngamia sp.
- Synclera jarbusalis (Walker, 1859)
- Terastia meticulosalis Guenée, 1854
- Tomopteryx pterophoralis (Walker, 1865)
- Udea secernalis (Möschler, 1890)

===== Schoenobiinae =====
- Carectocultus perstrialis (Hübner, 1825)

==== Pyralidae ====
===== Chrysauginae =====
- Bonchis munitalis (Lederer, 1863)
- Carcha hersilialis Walker, 1859
- Murgisca cervinalis Walker, 1863
- Parachmidia fervidalis (Walker, 1865)

===== Epipaschiinae =====
- Deuterolita ragonoti (Möschler, 1890)
- Jocara fragilis Walker, 1863
- Macalla thyrsisalis Walker, 1859

===== Galleriinae =====
- Corcyra cephalonica (Stainton, 1865)
- Galleria mellonella (Linnaeus, 1758)

===== Phycitinae =====
- Amegarthria cervicalis (Dyar, 1919)
- Amyelois transitella (Walker, 1863)
- Anabasis ochrodesma (Zeller, 1881)
- Anadelosemia texanella (Hulst, 1892)
- Ancylostomia stercorea (Zeller, 1848)
- Anegcephalesis arctella (Ragonot, 1893)
- Anypsipyla univitella Dyar, 1914
- Aptunga culmenicola Neunzig, 1996
- Aptunga setadebilia Neunzig, 1996
- Aptunga vega Neunzig, 1996
- Australephestiodes stictella Hampson, 1901
- Bema neuricella (Zeller, 1848)
- Cactoblastis cactorum (Berg, 1885)
- Caristanius pellucidellus (Ragonot, 1888)
- Caristanius tripartitus Neunzig, 1996
- Caudellia pilosa Neunzig, 1996
- Chararica circiimperfecta Neunzig, 1996
- Coptarthria dasypyga (Zeller, 1881)
- Crocidomera fissuralis (Walker, 1863)
- Crocidomera imitata Neunzig, 1990
- Cryptobables sp.
- Dasypyga independencia Neunzig, 1996
- Davara caricae (Dyar, 1913)
- Davara interjecta Heinrich, 1956
- Davara rufulella (Ragonot, 1888)
- Dioryctria amatella (Hulst, 1887)
- Dioryctria dominguensis Neunzig, 1996
- Dioryctria postmajorella Neunzig, 1996
- Ectomyelois decolor (Zeller, 1881)
- Ectomyelois muriscis (Dyar, 1914)
- Elasmopalpus lignosellus (Zeller, 1848)
- Ephestia cautella (Walker, 1883)
- Ephestia elutella (Hübner, 1796)
- Ephestia kuhniella Zeller, 1879
- Erelieva quantulella (Hulst, 1887)
- Etiella zinckenella (Treitschke, 1832)
- Fundella argentina Dyar, 1919
- Fundella ignobilis Heinrich, 1945
- Fundella pelluscens Zeller, 1848
- Hemiptiloceroides deltus Neunzig & Dow, 1993
- Homeosoma electella (Hulst, 1887)
- Hypargyria slosonella (Hulst, 1900)
- Hypochalcia cervinistrigalis Walker, 1863
- Hypsipyla grandella (Zeller, 1848)
- Lascelina pedernalensis Neunzig, 1996
- Lipographis subosseella Hulst, 1892
- Moodna antilleana Neunzig, 1996
- Moodnopsis portoricensis Heinrich, 1956
- Nefundella munroei Neunzig, 2003
- Olyca phryganoides Walker, 1857
- Oncolabis anticella Zeller, 1848
- Oryctometopia fossulatella Ragonot, 1888
- Ozamia lucidalis (Walker, 1863)
- Ozamia plagata Neunzig, 1996
- Peadus burdettellus (Schaus, 1913)
- Phycitodes olivaceella (Ragonot, 1888)
- Plodia interpunctella (Hübner, 1813)
- Salebria infusella (Zeller, 1848)
- Stylopalpia lunigerella Hampson, 1901
- Ufa rubedinella (Zeller, 1848)
- Varneria albiornatella Neunzig, 1996
- Zamagiria laidion (Zeller, 1881)
- Zamagiria rawlinsi Neunzig, 1996

===== Pyralinae =====
- Pseudasopia intermedialis (Walker, 1862)
- Pyralis manihotalis Guenée, 1854

=== Pterophoroidea ===
==== Pterophoridae ====
- Adaina thomae (Zeller, 1877)
- Exelastis montischristi (Walsingham, 1897)
- Leioptilus agraphodactylus (Walker, 1864)
- Leioptilus inquinatus (Zeller, 1893)
- Oidaematophorus ossipellis (Walsingham, 1897)

=== Cossoidea ===
==== Cossidae ====
===== Zeuzerinae =====
- Psychonoctua personalis Grote, 1866

==== Epipyropidae ====
- Fulgoraecia cucullata (Heinrich, 1931)

==== Limacodidae ====
- Heuretes daidaleos Epstein & Miller, 1990
- Heuretes divisus Epstein & Miller, 1990

=== Castnioidea ===
==== Castniidae ====
===== Castniinae =====
- Ircila hecate (Herrich-Schäffer, 1854)

=== Tortricoidea ===
==== Tortricidae ====
===== Chlidanotinae =====
- Ardeutica melidora Razowski, 1984
- Ardeutica sphenobathra (Meyrick, 1917)
- Polyortha naevifera Razowski, 1984
- Polyortha nigriguttata Walsingham, 1914
- †Polyvena horatis Poinar & Brown, 1993 [Dominican amber]

===== Olethreutinae =====
- Bactra philocherda Diakonoff, 1964
- Caccocharis cymotoma (Meyrick, 1917)
- Crocidosema longipalpana (Möschler, 1891)
- Crocidosema plebejana Zeller, 1847
- Cryptaspasma bipenicilla J. Brown & R. Brown, 2004
- Cryptaspasma lugubris (Felder, 1875)
- Cydia ingens (Heinrich, 1926)
- Cydia membrosa (Heinrich, 1926)
- Epiblema strenuana (Walker, 1863)
- Episimus guiana (Busck, 1913)
- Episimus transferrana (Walker, 1863)
- Gymnandrosoma aurantianum Costa Lima, 1927
- Gymnandrosoma leucothorax Adamski & Brown, 2001
- Olethreutes subapicana Walker, 1863
- Rhopobota cicatrix Razowski, 1999
- Rhopobota macroceria Razowski, 1999
- Rhopobota microceria Razowski, 1999
- Rhopobota unidens Razowski, 1999
- Rhyacionia frustrana (Comstock, 1880)
- Rhyacionia pallidicosta Razowski, 1999
- Strepsicrates smithiana Walsingham, 1891

===== Tortricinae =====
- Amorbia sp.
- Apotoforma monochroma (Walsingham, 1897)
- Apotoforma negans (Walsingham, 1897)
- Argyrotaenia bisignata Razowski, 1999
- Argyrotaenia ceramica Razowski, 1999
- Argyrotaenia felisana Razowski, 1999
- Argyrotaenia mesosignaria Razowski, 1999
- Argyrotaenia minisignaria Razowski, 1999
- Argyrotaenia neibana Razowski, 1999
- Argyrotaenia nuezana Razowski, 1999
- Argyrotaenia ochrochroa Razowski, 1999
- Argyrotaenia thamaluncus Razowski, 1999
- Bonagota dominicana Razowski, 1999
- Claduncaria ochrochlaena (Razowski, 1999)
- Cochylis pimana (Busck, 1907)
- Coelostathma parallelana Walsingham, 1897
- Eugnosta chalicophora Razowski, 1999
- Orthocomotis independentia Razowski, 1999
- Platynota flavedana Clemens, 1860
- Platynota restitutana (Walker, 1863)
- Platynota rostrana (Walker, 1863)
- Saphenista peraviae Razowski, 1994

=== Geometroidea ===
==== Uraniidae ====
- Manidia excavata (Walker, 1854)

==== Geometridae ====
===== Ennominae =====
- Arilophia rawlinsi Rindge, 1990
- Cyclomia mopsaria mopsaria Guenée, 1858
- Digrammia heliothidata (Guenée, 1858)
- Epimecis detexta Walker, 1860
- Epimecis hortaria (Fabricius, 1794)
- Epimecis matronaria (Guenée, 1857)
- Epimecis scolopaiae scolopaiae Drury, 1773
- Epimecis scolopaiae transitaria Walker, 1860
- Erastria decrepitaria decrepitaria (Hübner, 1823)
- Euchlaena amoenaria astylusaria Walker, 1860
- Iridopsis idonearia idonearia (Walker, 1860)
- Iridopsis monticola (Rindge, 1966)
- Macaria abydata Guenée, 1858
- Macaria everiata Guenée, 1858
- Macaria inoptata Walker, 1861
- Macaria paleolata Guenée, 1858
- Microsema immaculata (Warren, 1897)
- Nepheloleuca complicata (Guenée, 1858)
- Nepheloleuca floridata (Grote, 1883)
- Numia terebintharia Guenée, 1858
- Oxydia vesulia transponens (Walker, 1860)
- Patalene epionata (Guenée, 1858)
- Patalene nicoaria (Walker, 1860)
- Patalene nutriaria (Walker, 1860)
- Pero nerisaria (Walker, 1860)
- Pero rica Poole, 1987
- Pero sella Poole, 1987
- Phrygionis bicornis Scoble, 1994
- Phrygionis ferreus Scoble, 1994
- Phrygionis rawlinsi Scoble, 1994
- Pyrinia fusilineata Walker, 1863
- Renia fraternalis (J.B. Smith, 1895)
- Sabulodes subopalaria (Walker, 1860)
- Semiothisa cosmiata Walker, 1861
- Semiothisa increta (Walker, 1861)
- Sphacelodes haitiaria Oberthür, 1923
- Thysanopyga abdominaria (Guenée, 1858)
- Thysanopyga nicetaria (Guenée, 1858)
- Thysanopyga proditata (Walker, 1861)

===== Geometrinae =====
- Synchlora herbaria herbaria (Fabricius, 1794)

===== Larentiinae =====
- Disclisioprocta stellata (Guenée, 1858)
- Euphyia perturbata Walker, 1862
- Obila pannosata (Guenée, 1858)
- Pterocypha floridata (Walker, 1863)
- Triphosa affirmata (Guenée, 1858)
- Xanthorhoe divisata (Walker, 1863)

===== Oenochrominae =====
- Almodes terraria Guenée, 1858

===== Sterrhinae =====
- Acratodes phakellurata Guenée, 1858
- Cyclophora nanaria (Walker, 1861)
- Euacidalia externata (Walker, 1863)
- Eumacrodes yponomeutaria (Guenée, 1858)
- Leptostales noctuata (Guenée, 1858)
- Leptostales phorcaria (Guenée, 1858)
- Lobocleta dativaria Schaus, 1940
- Lobocleta inermaria (Guenée, 1858)
- Lobocleta monogrammata (Guenée, 1858)
- Lobocleta nymphidiata (Guenée, 1858)
- Lobocleta perditaria (Walker, 1866)
- Pleuroprucha rudimentaria (Guenée, 1858)
- Ptychamalia botydata (Walker, 1861)
- Scopula micrata (Guenée, 1858)
- Semaeopus castaria (Guenée, 1858)
- Semaeopus indignaria indignaria (Guenée, 1858)
- Sterrha curvicauda Schaus, 1940

=== Bombycoidea ===
==== Saturniidae ====
===== Hemileucinae =====
- Hispaniodirphia lemaireiana Rougerie & Herbin, 2006
- Hispaniodirphia plana (Walker, 1855)

=== Sphingoidea ===
==== Sphingidae ====
===== Macroglossinae =====
====== Dilophonotini ======
- Aellopos tantalus (Linnaeus, 1758)
- Callionima calliomenae (Schaufuss, 1870)
- Enyo lugubris lugubris (Linnaeus, 1771)
- Enyo ocypete (Linnaeus, 1758)
- Erinnyis alope alope (Drury, 1770)
- Erinnyis crameri (Schaus, 1898)
- Erinnyis domingonis (Butler, 1875)
- Erinnyis ello ello (Linnaeus, 1758)
- Erinnyis guttularis (Walker, 1856)
- Erinnyis lassauxii (Boisduval, 1859)
- Erinnyis obscura (Fabricius, 1775)
- Erinnyis oenotrus (Cramer, 1782)
- Isognathus rimosus molitor Rothschild & Jordan, 1915
- Pachylia ficus (Linnaeus, 1758)
- Pachylia syces insularis (Hübner, 1822)
- Pachylioides resumens (Walker, 1856)
- Perigonia caryae Cadiou & Rawlins, 1998
- Perigonia glaucescens Walker, 1856
- Perigonia lefebraei (Lucas, 1846)
- Perigonia lusca lusca (Fabricius, 1777)
- Perigonia manni Clark, 1935
- Phrixus caicus (Cramer, 1777)
- Pseudosphinx tetrio (Linnaeus, 1771)

====== Philampelini ======
- Eumorpha fasciata fasciata (Sulzer, 1776)
- Eumorpha labruscae labruscae (Linnaeus, 1758)
- Eumorpha strenua (Ménétriès, 1857)
- Eumorpha vitis vitis (Linnaeus, 1758)

====== Macroglossini ======
- Cautethia carsusi Haxaire & Schmitt, 2001
- Cautethia grotei grotei H. Edwards, 1882
- Cautethia noctuiformis noctuiformis (Walker, 1856)
- Hyles lineata lineata (Fabricius, 1775)
- Xylophanes chiron necchus (Cramer, 1779)
- Xylophanes falco (Walker, 1856)
- Xylophanes irrorata (Grote, 1865)
- Xylophanes pluto (Fabricius, 1777)
- Xylophanes porcus (Hübner, 1823)
- Xylophanes rhodocera (Walker, 1856)
- Xylophanes tersa tersa (Linnaeus, 1771)

===== Sphinginae =====
====== Sphingini ======
- Agrius cingulatus (Fabricius, 1775)
- Amphonyx kofleri Eitschberger, 2006
- Amphonyx rivularis Butler, 1875
- Cocytius antaeus antaeus (Drury, 1773)
- Cocytius duponchel (Poey, 1832)
- Manduca afflicta afflicta (Grote, 1865)
- Manduca brontes haitiensis (Clark, 1916)
- Manduca caribbea (Cary, 1952)
- Manduca quinquemaculata (Haworth, 1803)
- Manduca rustica dominicana (Gehlen, 1928)
- Manduca sexta jamaicensis (Linnaeus, 1764)
- Nannoparce poeyi poeyi Grote, 1867
- Neococytius cluentius (Cramer, 1775)
- Sphinx tricolor Clark, 1923

====== Smerinthini ======
- Protambulyx strigilis strigilis (Linnaeus, 1771)

=== Noctuoidea ===
==== Notodontidae ====
===== Hapigiinae =====
- Antillisa barbuti Thiaucourt, 2006
- Antillisa vincenti Thiaucourt, 2006

===== Hemiceratinae =====
- Hemiceras domingonis Dyar, 1908

===== Nystaleinae =====
- Hippia vittipalpis (Walker, 1857)
- Nystalea ebalea (Cramer, 1779)
- Nystalea aequipars Walker, 1858
- Nystalea indiana Grote, 1884
- Pentobesa smithsoni Weller, 1991
- Symmerista albifrons (Smith, 1797)

==== Erebidae ====
===== Arctiinae =====
- Bituryx lanceolata (Walker, 1856)
- Calidota strigosa (Walker, 1855)
- Caribarctia bertrandae Vincent, 2006
- Caribarctia cardinalis Ferguson, 1985
- Halysidota ata Watson, 1980
- Holomelina semirosea (Druce, 1889)
- Hypercompe decora (Walker, 1855)
- Pareuchaetes insulata (Walker, 1855)

===== Ctenuchinae =====
- Ctenucha editha (Walker, 1856)
- Clystea rubipectus Schaus, 1898
- Empyreuma affinis Rothschild, 1912
- Empyreuma lichas (Fabricius, 1781)
- Empyreuma pugione (Linnaeus, 1767)
- Eunomia columbina (Fabricius, 1793)
- Horama panthalon texana (Grote, 1860)
- Horama rawlinsi McCabe, 1992
- Lymire candida Forbes, 1917
- Lymire edwardsi (Grote, 1881)
- Napata munda (Walker, 1856)
- Nyridela chalciope (Hübner, 1827)
- Phoenicoprocta partheni (Fabricius, 1793)

===== Lithosiinae =====
- Aethosia ectrocta Hampson, 1900
- Afrida basiposis Dyar, 1913
- Afrida tortricifascies Dyar, 1913
- Areva trigemmis (Hübner, 1824–1831)
- Boenasa angelica Schaus, 1924
- Boenasa nigrorosea Walker, 1865
- Mulona lapidaria Walker, 1866
- Torycus domingonis Schaus, 1924

===== Pericopinae =====
- Composia credula (Fabricius, 1775)
- Ctenuchidia subcyanea (Walker, 1845)
- Hyalurga vinosa (Drury, 1773)
- Stenognatha flinti Todd, 1982
- Utetheisa bella (Linnaeus, 1758)
- Utetheisa ornatrix ornatrix (Linnaeus, 1758)

===== Phaegopterinae =====
- Lophocampa bahorucoensis Vincent, 2005
- Lophocampa caryae (Harris, 1841)
- Lophocampa duarteiensis Vincent, 2005
- Lophocampa latepunctata Vincent, 2005
- Lophocampa lesieuri Vincent, 2005
- Lophocampa neibaensis Vincent, 2005

==== Noctuidae ====
===== Acontiinae =====
- Acontia tetragona Walker, 1857
- Chobata discalis Walker, 1857
- Cobubatha metaspilaris Walker, 1863
- Cydosia nobilitella Cramer, 1779
- Eublemma recta (Guenée, 1852)
- Eublemma rosescens Hampson, 1898
- Marimatha trajectalis Walker, 1865
- Ponometia exigua (Fabricius, 1793)
- Spragueia dama (Guenée, 1852)
- Spragueia margana (Fabricius, 1794)
- Tarachidia venustula (Walker, 1865)

===== Agaristinae =====
- Caularis undulans Walker, 1857
- Seirocastnia tribuna (Hübner, 1825)

===== Amphipyrinae =====
- Antachara rotundata Walker, 1858
- Callopistria floridensis Guenée, 1852
- Catabena vitrina (Walker, 1857)
- Condica albigera (Guenée, 1852)
- Condica circuita (Guenée, 1852)
- Condica concisa (Walker, 1856)
- Condica mobilis (Walker, 1856)
- Condica punctifera (Walker, 1857)
- Condica sufficiens (Walker, 1858)
- Condica sutor (Guenée, 1852)
- Cropia indigna (Walker, 1857)
- Cropia subapicalis (Walker, 1857)
- Dypterygia punctirena (Walker, 1857)
- Hampsonodes ampliplaga (Walker, 1858)
- Micrathetis triplex (Walker, 1857)
- Speocropia scriptura (Walker, 1858)

===== Bagisarinae =====
- Bagisara repanda (Fabricius, 1793)
- Bagisara tristicta Hampson, 1898

===== Catocalinae =====
- Achaea ablunaris (Guenée, 1852)
- Alabama argillacea (Hübner, 1823)
- Anomis editrix (Guenée, 1852)
- Anomis erosa (Hübner, 1821)
- Anomis exacta Hübner, 1822
- Anomis flava (Fabricius, 1775)
- Anomis impasta Guenée, 1852
- Anomis luridula Guenée, 1852
- Anomis properans (Walker, 1857)
- Antapistis leucospila (Walker, 1865)
- Antiblemma brevipennis (Walker, 1865)
- Antiblemma leucospila (Walker, 1865)
- Antiblemma rufinans (Guenée, 1852)
- Antiblemma sterope (Walker, 1858)
- Anticarsia gemmatalis Hübner, 1818
- Ascalapha odorata (Linnaeus, 1758)
- Azeta quassa Walker, 1858
- Azeta repugnalis Hübner, 1831
- Baniana relapsa (Walker, 1858)
- Batina marginalis Walker, 1865
- Bulia confirmans (Walker, 1857)
- Caenurgia adusta (Walker, 1865)
- Casandria ferrocana Walker, 1857
- Celiptera levina Stoll, 1782
- Coenipeta mollis Walker, 1865
- Concana mundissima Walker, 1857
- Diphthera festiva (Fabricius, 1775)
- Elousa albicans Walker, 1857
- Ephyrodes cacata Guenée, 1852
- Ephyrodes omicron Guenée, 1852
- Epidromia pyraliformis (Walker, 1858)
- Epidromia valida (Walker, 1865c)
- Epitausa laetabilis Walker, 1857
- Eudocima serpentifera (Walker, 1857)
- Eulepidotis addens (Walker, 1858)
- Eulepidotis modestula (Herrich-Schäffer, 1869)
- Glympis arenalis (Walker, 1865)
- Glympis eubolialis (Walker, 1865)
- Gonodonta bidens bidens Geyer, 1832
- Gonodonta incurva (Sepp, 1840)
- Gonodonta nitidimacula Guenée, 1852
- Gonodonta nutrix (Stoll, 1780)
- Gonodonta unica Neumoegen, 1891
- Gonodonta uxoria (Cramer, 1780)
- Hemeroblemma lienaris (Hübner, 1823)
- Hemeroblemma numeria (Drury, 1773)
- Hemeroblemma rengus (Poey, 1832)
- Hemeroplanis aurora (Walker, 1865)
- Hemeroplanis scopulepes Haworth, 1809
- Hypocala andremona (Stoll, 1781)
- Hypogrammodes balma (Guenée, 1852)
- Isogona scindens (Walker, 1858)
- Kakopoda progenies (Guenée, 1852)
- Lesmone formularis (Geyer, 1837)
- Letis intracta Walker, 1858
- Letis mycerina Cramer, 1777
- Litoprosopus haitiensis Hampson, 1926
- Litoprosopus hatuey (Poey, 1832)
- Litoprosopus puncticosta Hampson, 1926
- Massala obvertens (Walker, 1858)
- Melipotis acontioides (Guenée, 1852)
- Melipotis contorta (Guenée, 1852)
- Melipotis famelica (Guenée, 1852)
- Melipotis fasciolaris (Hübner, 1825)
- Melipotis indomita (Walker, 1857)
- Melipotis januaris (Guenée, 1852)
- Melipotis jucunda Hübner, 1818
- Melipotis lucigera (Walker, 1857)
- Melipotis ochrodes (Guenée, 1852)
- Melipotis perpendicularis (Guenée, 1852)
- Melipotis strigifera (Walker, 1857)
- Metallata absumens (Walker, 1862)
- Metria irresoluta (Walker, 1858)
- Mocis diffluens (Guenée, 1852)
- Mocis disseverans (Walker, 1858)
- Mocis exscindens (Walker, 1858)
- Mocis latipes (Guenée, 1852)
- Mocis repanda (Fabricius, 1794)
- Ophisma tropicalis Guenée, 1852
- Ophiusa salmus Guenée, 1852
- Oraesia basiplaga (Walker, 1865)
- Oraesia excitans Walker, 1857
- Oraesia honesta Walker, 1857
- Panula inconstans (Guenée, 1852)
- Pararcte immanis (Walker, 1858b)
- Perasia flexa (Guenée, 1852)
- Perasia garnoti (Guenée, 1852)
- Perasia inficita (Walker, 1865)
- Plusiodonta stimulans (Walker, 1857)
- Ptichodis immunis (Guenée, 1852)
- Ptichodis infecta (Walker, 1858)
- Radara nealcesalis (Walker, 1859)
- Radara tauralis (Walker, 1865)
- Renodes aequalis (Walker, 1865)
- Renodes eupithecioides (Walker, 1858)
- Syllectra ericata (Cramer, 1780)
- Syllectra congemmalis Hübner, 1823
- Thysania zenobia (Cramer, 1777)
- Toxonprucha diffundens (Walker, 1858)
- Toxonprucha excavata (Walker, 1865)
- Trigonodes lucassi Guenée, 1852
- Tyrissa recurva Walker, 1866
- Zale albidula (Walker, 1865)
- Zale fictilis Guenée, 1852
- Zale fuliginosa (Walker, 1857)
- Zale peruncta (Guenée, 1852)

===== Chloephorinae =====
- Collomena filifera (Walker, 1857)

===== Euteliinae =====
- Eutelia furcata (Walker, 1865)
- Paectes arcigera (Guenée, 1852)

===== Glottulinae =====
- Xanthopastis timais (Cramer, 1782)

===== Hadeninae =====
- Elaphria cuprescens (Hampson, 1909)
- Elaphria deliriosa (Walker, 1857a)
- Elaphria nucicolora (Guenée, 1852)
- Lacinipolia distributa (Möschler, 1886)
- Leucania chejela (Schaus, 1921)
- Leucania clarescens Möschler, 1856
- Leucania humidicola Guenée, 1852
- Leucania dorsalis Walker, 1856
- Leucania incognita (Barnes & McDunnough, 1918)
- Leucania inconspicua Herrich-Schäffer, 1868
- Leucania lamisma Adams, 2001
- Leucania latiuscula Herrich-Schäffer, 1868
- Leucania lobrega Adams, 2001
- Leucania neiba Adams, 2001
- Leucania rawlinsi Adams, 2001
- Leucania sonroja Adams, 2001
- Leucania senescens Möschler, 1890
- Mythimna unipuncta (Haworth, 1809)
- Spodoptera albula (Walker, 1857)
- Spodoptera dolichos (Fabricius, 1794)
- Spodoptera eridania (Cramer, 1782)
- Spodoptera exigua (Hübner, 1808)
- Spodoptera frugiperda (J. E. Smith, 1797)
- Spodoptera latisfacia (Walker, 1856)
- Spodoptera ornithogalli (Guenée, 1852)
- Spodoptera pulchella (Herrich-Schäffer, 1868)

===== Heliothinae =====
- Helicoverpa zea (Boddie, 1850)
- Heliothis lucilinea (Walker, 1858)
- Heliothis subflexa (Guenée, 1852)
- Heliothis virescens (Fabricius, 1777)

===== Herminiinae =====
- Bleptina acastusalis Walker, 1858
- Bleptina atymnusalis (Walker, 1858)
- Bleptina caradrinalis Guenée, 1854
- Bleptina hydrillalis Guenée, 1854
- Bleptina menalcasalis Walker, 1858
- Bleptina pithosalis Walker, 1858
- Heterogramma micculalis Guenée, 1854
- Hypenula complectalis (Guenée, 1854)
- Lophophora thaumasalis (Walker, 1858)
- Mursa phthisialis (Guenée, 1854)
- Mursa sotiusalis (Walker, 1859)
- Salia ferrigeralis (Walker, 1865)

===== Hypeninae =====
- Hypena concinnulalis Walker, 1865
- Hypena lividalis (Hübner, 1796)
- Hypena pacatalis Walker, 1858
- Hypena subidalis Guenée, 1854
- Hypena vetustalis Guenée, 1852

===== Noctuinae =====
- Agrotis apicalis (Herrich-Schäffer, 1868)
- Agrotis subterranea (Fabricius, 1794)
- Agrotis ipsilon (Hufnagel, 1766)
- Anicla infecta (Ochsenheimer, 1816)
- Feltia jaculifera (Guenée, 1852)

===== Nolinae =====
- Nola cereella (Bosc, 1800)

===== Plusiinae =====
- Argyrogramma verruca (Fabricius, 1794)
- Autoplusia egena (Guenée, 1852)
- Mouralia tinctoides (Guenée, 1852)
- Plusia calceolaris Walker, 1857
- Pseudoplusia includens (Walker, 1857)
- Trichoplusia ni (Hübner, 1803)

===== Sarrothripinae =====
- Characoma sp.
- Iscadia aperta Walker, 1857

===== Unplaced to subfamily =====
- Homoptera terminalis Walker, 1857
- Magusa orbifera (Walker, 1857a)
- Notioplusia illustrata (Guenée, 1852)
- Poaphila scita Walker, 1865
- Phurys contenta Walker, 1865
- Phurys pura Walker, 1865
- Selenisa humeralis (Walker, 1857)
- Selenisa projiciens (Hampson, 1826)
