= Megarthria =

Scientific classification
- Domain: Eukaryota
- Kingdom: Animalia
- Phylum: Arthropoda
- Class: Insecta
- Order: Lepidoptera
- Family: Pyralidae
- Subfamily: Phycitinae
- Genus: Megarthria; Ragonot, 1893

Synonyms
- Amegarthia Neunzig & Dow, 1993

Genus of moths

Megarthria is a genus of snout moths described by Émile Louis Ragonot in 1893.

== Species ==
- Megarthria peterseni (Zeller, 1881)
