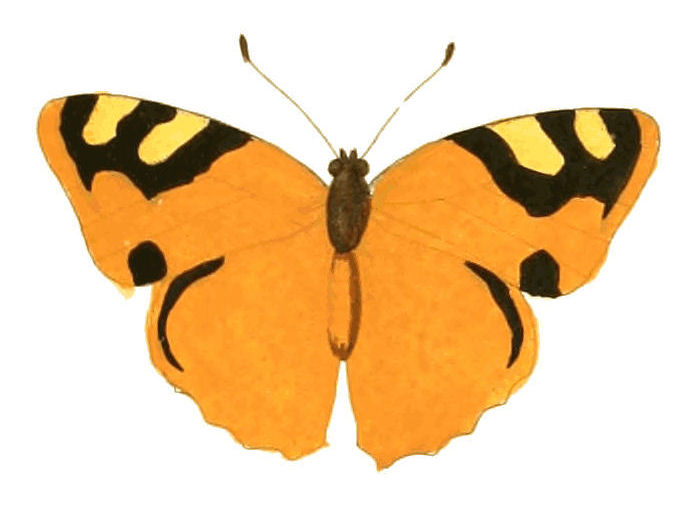
- Dorsal view
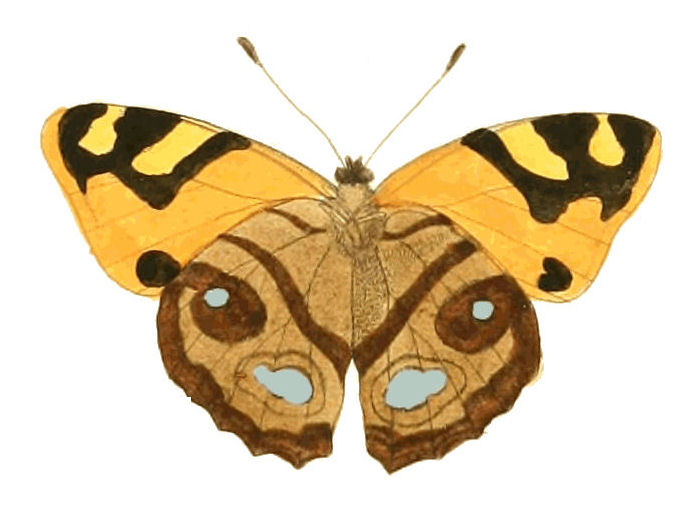
- Ventral view

Scientific classification
- Kingdom: Animalia
- Phylum: Arthropoda
- Class: Insecta
- Order: Lepidoptera
- Family: Nymphalidae
- Genus: Lucinia; Hübner, [1823]
- Species: L. cadma

Binomial name
- Lucinia cadma (Drury, 1773)

Synonyms
- Papilio cadma Drury, 1773; Lucinia sida cubana Fruhstorfer, 1912; Nymphalis cadma torrebia Ménétriés, 1832

= Lucinia cadma =

Species of butterfly

Lucinia cadma is a species of brush-footed butterfly (family Nymphalidae). It was first described by Dru Drury in 1773 from Jamaica. Distinct subspecies are found on other Caribbean islands.

== Description ==
Upper side: antennae black. Head, thorax, and abdomen dark brown. Wings tawny yellow. The anterior having the extreme parts, near the tips, black; with two yellowish spots thereon, joining the anterior edges; also a round black spot situated at the lower corners on the posterior edges. Posterior wings immaculate, except a black streak placed on the anterior edges next the upper corners.

Under side: tongue black. Breast, legs, and abdomen ash-coloured. The superior wings marked and coloured as on the upper side, but less distinctly. Posterior wings tawny orange, having a broad ash-coloured bar crossing them from the anterior to the abdominal edges. On this bar are placed two eyes, with double pupils; the lower one being of a fine blue with a yellow iris; the upper one, next the anterior edges, blue and black, with a brown iris. Margins of the wings dentated.

Wing-span 2 inches (50 mm).

== Subspecies ==
- Lucinia cadma cadma (Jamaica)
- Lucinia cadma albomaculata Rindge, 1955 (Bahamas)
- Lucinia cadma sida Hübner, [1823] (Cuba)
- Lucinia cadma torrebia (Ménétriés, 1832) (Haiti)
