= Ethmia notatella =

Scientific classification
- Kingdom: Animalia
- Phylum: Arthropoda
- Class: Insecta
- Order: Lepidoptera
- Family: Depressariidae
- Genus: Ethmia
- Species: E. notatella

Binomial name
- Ethmia notatella (Walker, 1863)

Synonyms
- Psecadia notatella Walker, 1863; Psecadia xanthorrhoa Zeller, 1877; Ethmia xanthorrhoa

Species of moth

Ethmia notatella is a moth in the family Depressariidae. It is found in the Florida Keys, the Bahamas, Hispaniola, Puerto Rico and the Lesser Antilles (Curacao).

The length of the forewings is 10.4–13.4 mm (0.41–0.53 in). The ground color of the forewings is white or cream-white, with black markings, reflecting metallic blue-green. The ground color of the hindwings is white, becoming brown at the apex. Adults are on wing in March (in the Bahamas), from April to May (in Haiti), from June to July (Puerto Rico) and in April and from August to September (the Florida Keys).
