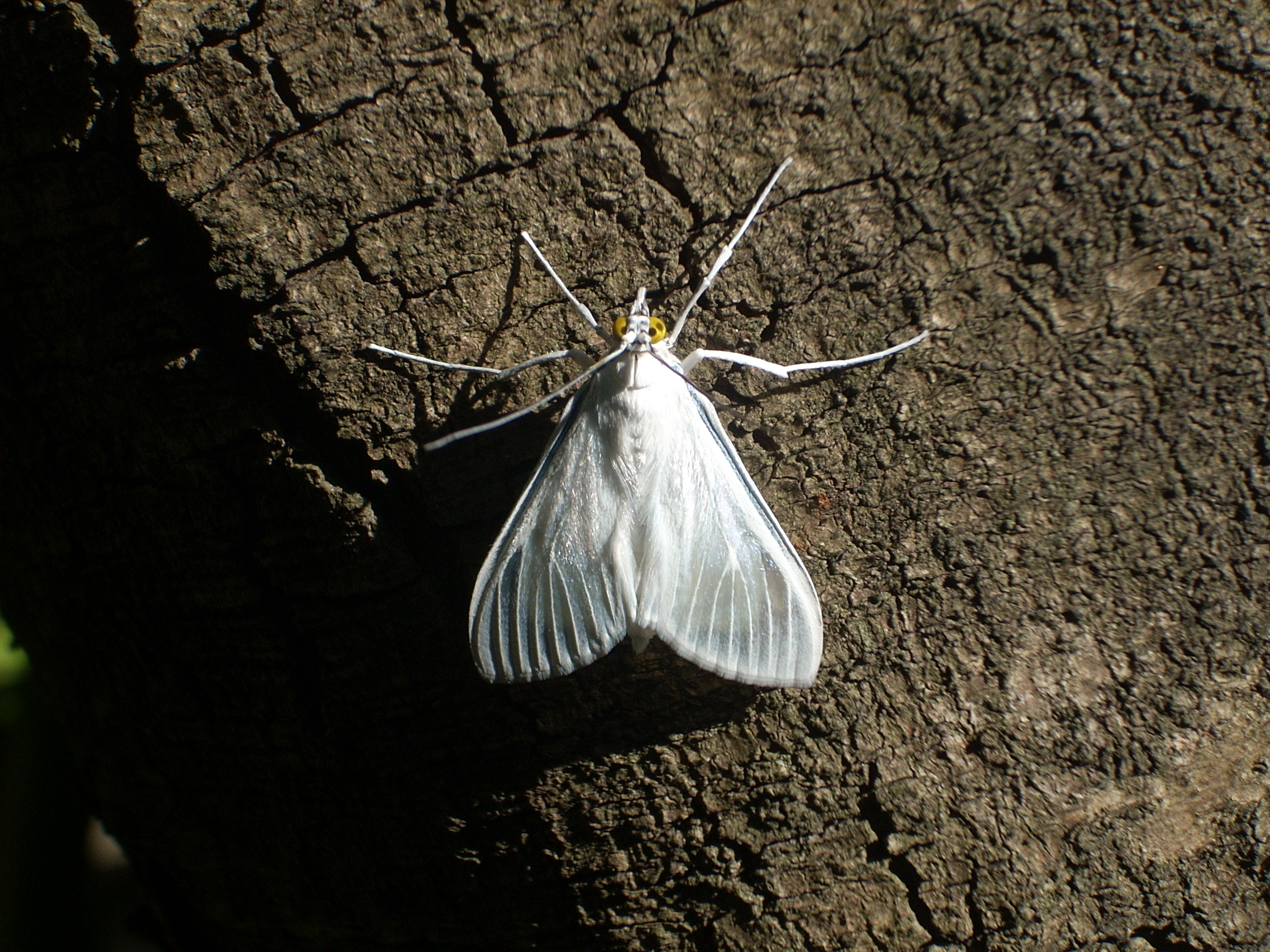

Scientific classification
- Domain: Eukaryota
- Kingdom: Animalia
- Phylum: Arthropoda
- Class: Insecta
- Order: Lepidoptera
- Family: Crambidae
- Genus: Palpita
- Species: P. flegia

Binomial name
- Palpita flegia (Cramer, 1777)

Synonyms
- Phalaena Pyralis flegia Cramer, 1777; Margarodes flegyalis Guenée, 1854; Margarodes phantasmalis Guenée, 1854; Margaronia virginalis Hübner, 1825; Paradosis villosalis Zeller, 1852; Pyralis flegialis Poey, 1832

= Palpita flegia =

Species of moth

Palpita flegia, the satin white moth, is a moth in the family Crambidae. It was described by Pieter Cramer in 1777. It is found in Suriname, Colombia, Brazil, Honduras, Nicaragua, Costa Rica, Panama, Mexico, the Caribbean and the United States, where it has been recorded from Alabama, Florida and Texas.

The moth is about 46 mm.

The larvae feed on Thevetia peruviana.
