= Megarthria peterseni =

Scientific classification
- Kingdom: Animalia
- Phylum: Arthropoda
- Clade: Pancrustacea
- Class: Insecta
- Order: Lepidoptera
- Family: Pyralidae
- Genus: Megarthria
- Species: M. peterseni

Binomial name
- Megarthria peterseni (Zeller, 1881)

Synonyms
- Myelois peterseni Zeller, 1881; Megarthria beta Heinrich, 1956; Megarthria cervicalis Dyar, 1919; Amegarthria cervicalis; Amegarthia cervicalis

Species of moth

Megarthria peterseni is a species of moth in the family Pyralidae. It was described by Philipp Christoph Zeller in 1881. It is found in Costa Rica, Cuba, Mexico, Belize, Guatemala, Panama, Colombia and Brazil (Rondônia).
