= Batina marginalis =

Scientific classification
- Kingdom: Animalia
- Phylum: Arthropoda
- Clade: Pancrustacea
- Class: Insecta
- Order: Lepidoptera
- Superfamily: Noctuoidea
- Family: Erebidae
- Subfamily: Calpinae
- Genus: Batina; Walker, 1865
- Species: B. marginalis

Binomial name
- Batina marginalis Walker, 1865

Species of moth

Batina marginalis is the only species in the monotypic moth genus Batina of the family Erebidae. It is found in the Dominican Republic. Both the genus and the species were first described by Francis Walker in 1865.
