= Ethmia paucella =

Scientific classification
- Kingdom: Animalia
- Phylum: Arthropoda
- Class: Insecta
- Order: Lepidoptera
- Family: Depressariidae
- Genus: Ethmia
- Species: E. paucella

Binomial name
- Ethmia paucella (Walker, 1863)

Synonyms
- Hyponomeuta paucellus Walker, 1863; Ethmia paucellus; Psecadia paucella

Species of moth

Ethmia paucella is a moth in the family Depressariidae. It is found in the Dominican Republic and Haiti.

The length of the forewings is 10.9–12.4 mm (0.43–0.49 in). The forewings have markings which are more or less evenly spaced and similar sized roundish spots of black reflecting metallic blue. The ground color of the hindwings is pale ocherous, except the costal area which is entirely clothed with bright ocherous, roughened scaling from the upper margin of the cell to the costal margin. Adults are on wing in June.
