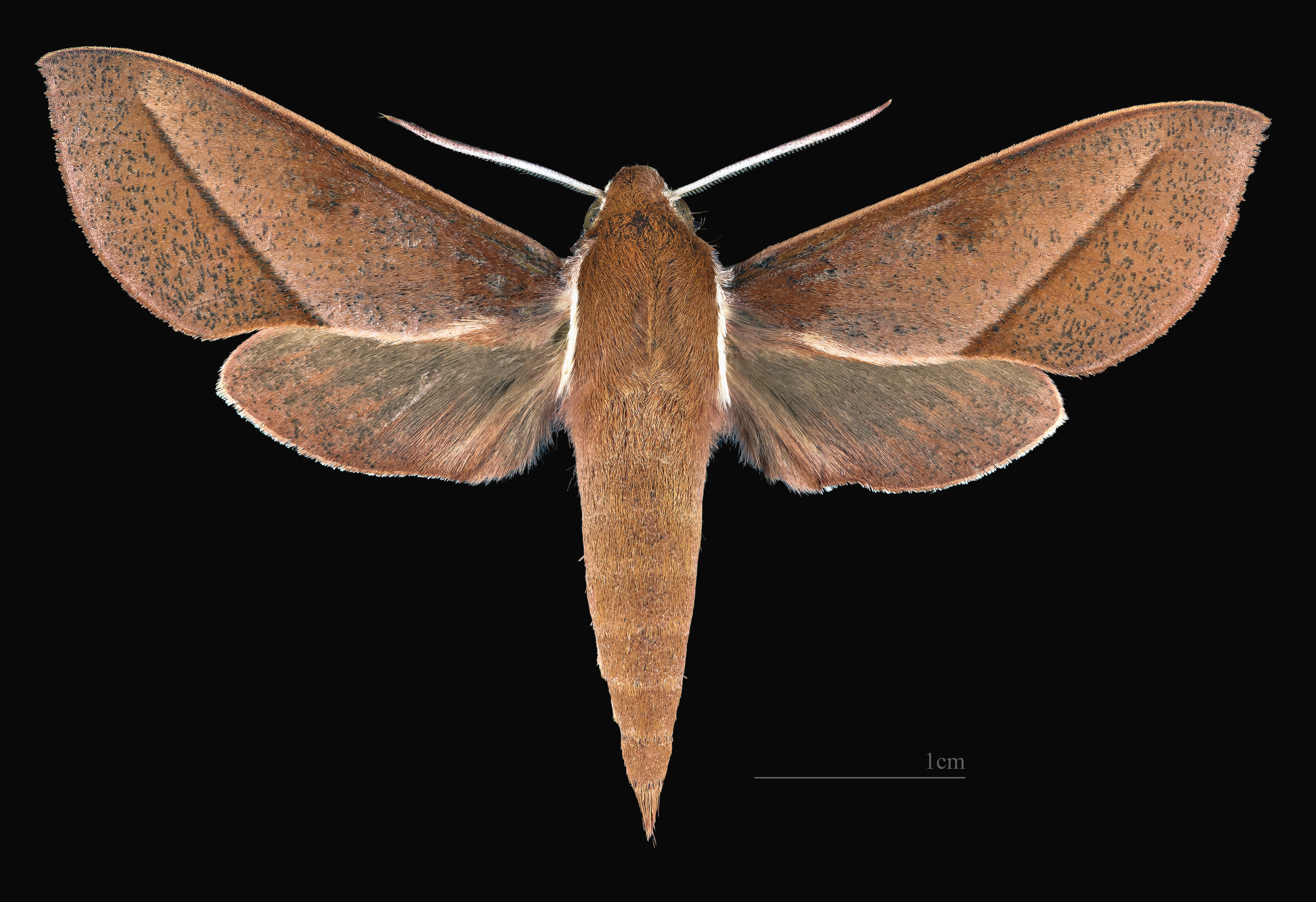
- Male dorsal
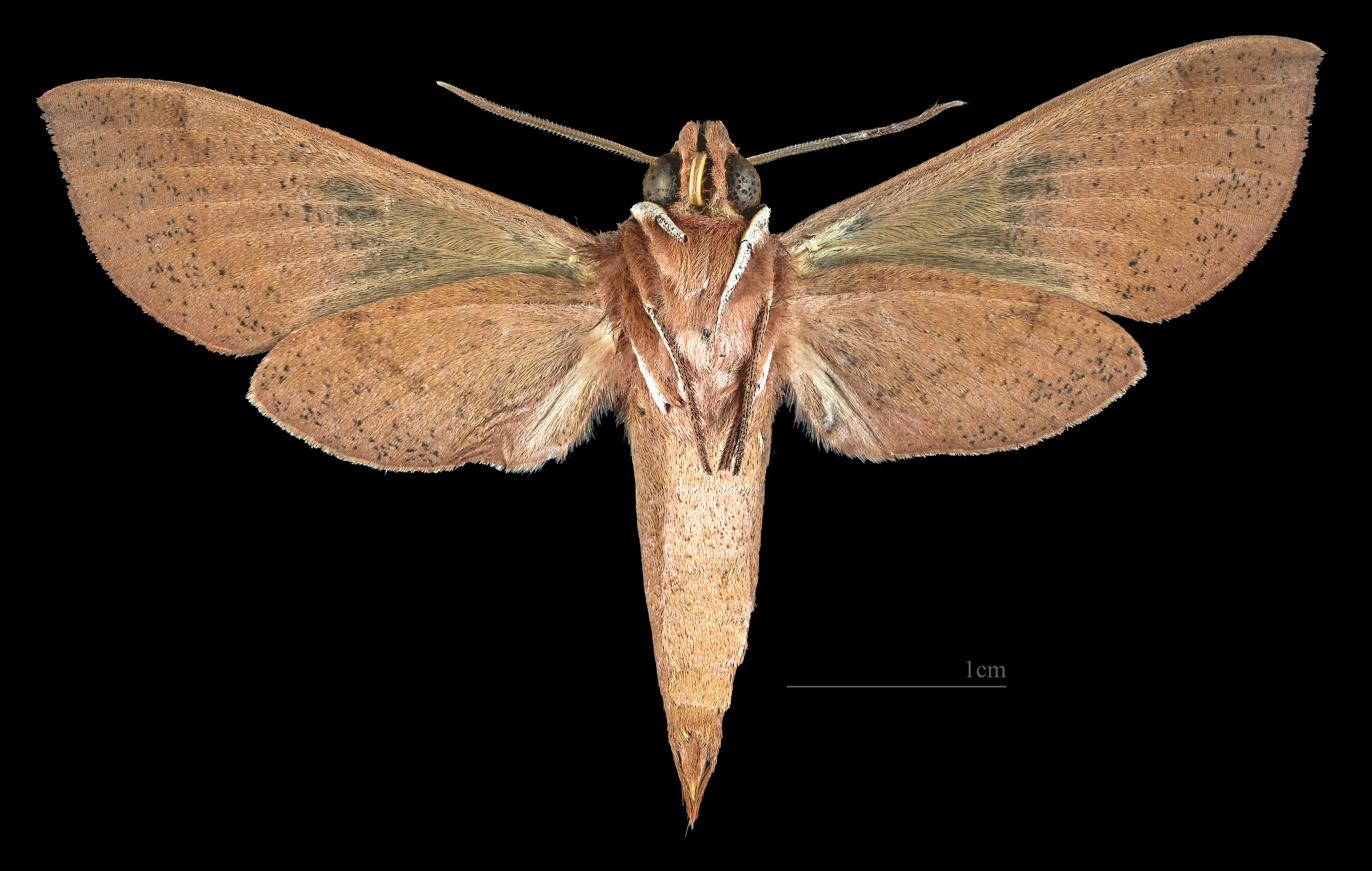
- Male ventral

Scientific classification
- Kingdom: Animalia
- Phylum: Arthropoda
- Class: Insecta
- Order: Lepidoptera
- Family: Sphingidae
- Genus: Xylophanes
- Species: X. irrorata

Binomial name
- Xylophanes irrorata (Grote, 1865)

Synonyms
- Chaerocampa irrorata Grote, 1865

= Xylophanes irrorata =

Species of moth

Xylophanes irrorata is a moth of the family Sphingidae. It is known from Cuba.

The upperside and underside of the body and wings is uniformly pale pinkish-brown, although the underside is paler than the upperside. The forewing upperside has a darker brown postmedian line, with a pale proximal border, running from the hind margin towards the apex (but not reaching it). The hindwing upperside has an olive-brown basal area.

Adults are probably on wing year-round.

The larvae possibly feed on Psychotria panamensis, Psychotria nervosa and Pavonia guanacastensis.
