= Acrocercops undifraga =

Scientific classification
- Kingdom: Animalia
- Phylum: Arthropoda
- Class: Insecta
- Order: Lepidoptera
- Family: Gracillariidae
- Genus: Acrocercops
- Species: A. undifraga

Binomial name
- Acrocercops undifraga Meyrick, 1931

Species of moth

Acrocercops undifraga is a moth of the family Gracillariidae. It is known from Cuba and Haiti.

The larvae feed on Solanum antillarum and Solanum torvum. They probably mine the leaves of their host plant.
