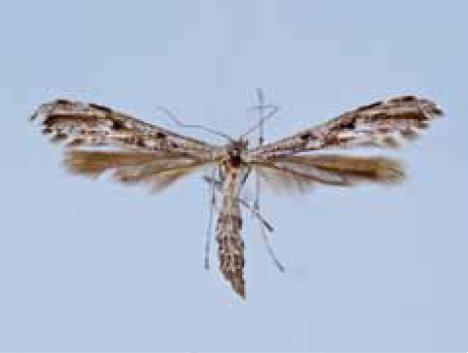

Scientific classification
- Kingdom: Animalia
- Phylum: Arthropoda
- Clade: Pancrustacea
- Class: Insecta
- Order: Lepidoptera
- Family: Pterophoridae
- Genus: Hellinsia
- Species: H. inquinatus

Binomial name
- Hellinsia inquinatus (Zeller, 1873)

Synonyms
- Odematophorus inquinatus Zeller, 1873; Oidaematophorus inquinatus

= Hellinsia inquinatus =

Species of plume moth

Hellinsia inquinatus is a moth of the family Pterophoridae. It is found in North America, including Florida, Mississippi, Oklahoma, Tennessee, Maryland, Alabama, Texas, Missouri, Colorado and Arizona. It has also been recorded from Hispaniola, Mexico, Puerto Rico and St. Thomas Island.

The wingspan is about 16–18 millimetres (0.63–0.71 in). Adults are on wing in April, June and December.

The larvae feed on Ambrosia artemissiifolia, Ambrosia trifida and Parthenium hysterophorus.
