= Coptarthria =

Scientific classification
- Kingdom: Animalia
- Phylum: Arthropoda
- Clade: Pancrustacea
- Class: Insecta
- Order: Lepidoptera
- Family: Pyralidae
- Subfamily: Phycitinae
- Genus: Coptarthria; Ragonot, 1893
- Species: C. dasypyga

Binomial name
- Coptarthria dasypyga (Zeller, 1881)

Synonyms
- Myelois dasypyga Zeller, 1881

Genus of moths

Coptarthria is a genus of snout moths. It was described by Ragonot, in 1893, and contains the species C. dasypyga. It is found in Colombia and Guatemala.
