= Ethmia abraxasella =

Scientific classification
- Kingdom: Animalia
- Phylum: Arthropoda
- Class: Insecta
- Order: Lepidoptera
- Family: Depressariidae
- Genus: Ethmia
- Species: E. abraxasella

Binomial name
- Ethmia abraxasella (Walker, 1864)

Synonyms
- Psecadia abraxasella Walker, 1864; Psecadia aureoapicella Moeschler, 1890; Ethmia clarissa Busck, 1914

Species of moth

Ethmia abraxasella is a moth in the family Depressariidae. It is found in Jamaica, Haiti, the Dominican Republic, Puerto Rico, Cuba and the Bahamas. It has also been recorded from southern Florida in the United States.

The length of the forewings is 7.1–8.8 mm (0.28–0.35 in). The ground color of the forewings is white. The costa is brownish gray from the base to just before the apex. The ground color of the hindwings is white, becoming brownish apically. Adults of subspecies abraxasella are on wing in February, from May to July and in October. Adults of subspecies clarissa are on wing in June, October and December (in Cuba) and in July (on the Bahamas).

== Subspecies ==
- Ethmia abraxasella abraxasella (Jamaica, Haiti, the Dominican Republic and Puerto Rico)
- Ethmia abraxasella clarissa (Busck, 1914) (Cuba and the Bahamas)
