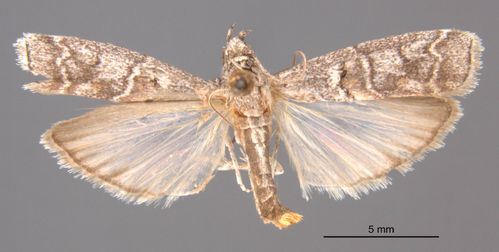

Scientific classification
- Domain: Eukaryota
- Kingdom: Animalia
- Phylum: Arthropoda
- Class: Insecta
- Order: Lepidoptera
- Family: Pyralidae
- Subfamily: Phycitinae
- Genus: Anegcephalesis; Dyar, 1917
- Species: A. arctella

Binomial name
- Anegcephalesis arctella (Ragonot, 1887)

Synonyms
- Phycita arctella Ragonot, 1887; Anegcephalesis cathaeretes Dyar, 1917; Anegcephalesis catheretes Dyar, 1919

= Anegcephalesis =

Genus of moths

Anegcephalesis is a genus of snout moths described by Harrison Gray Dyar Jr. in 1917.

It contains the species A. arctella described by Émile Louis Ragonot in 1887. It is found in North America, with a wingspan about 23 mm.

The genus also contains Anegcephalesis cathaeretes.
