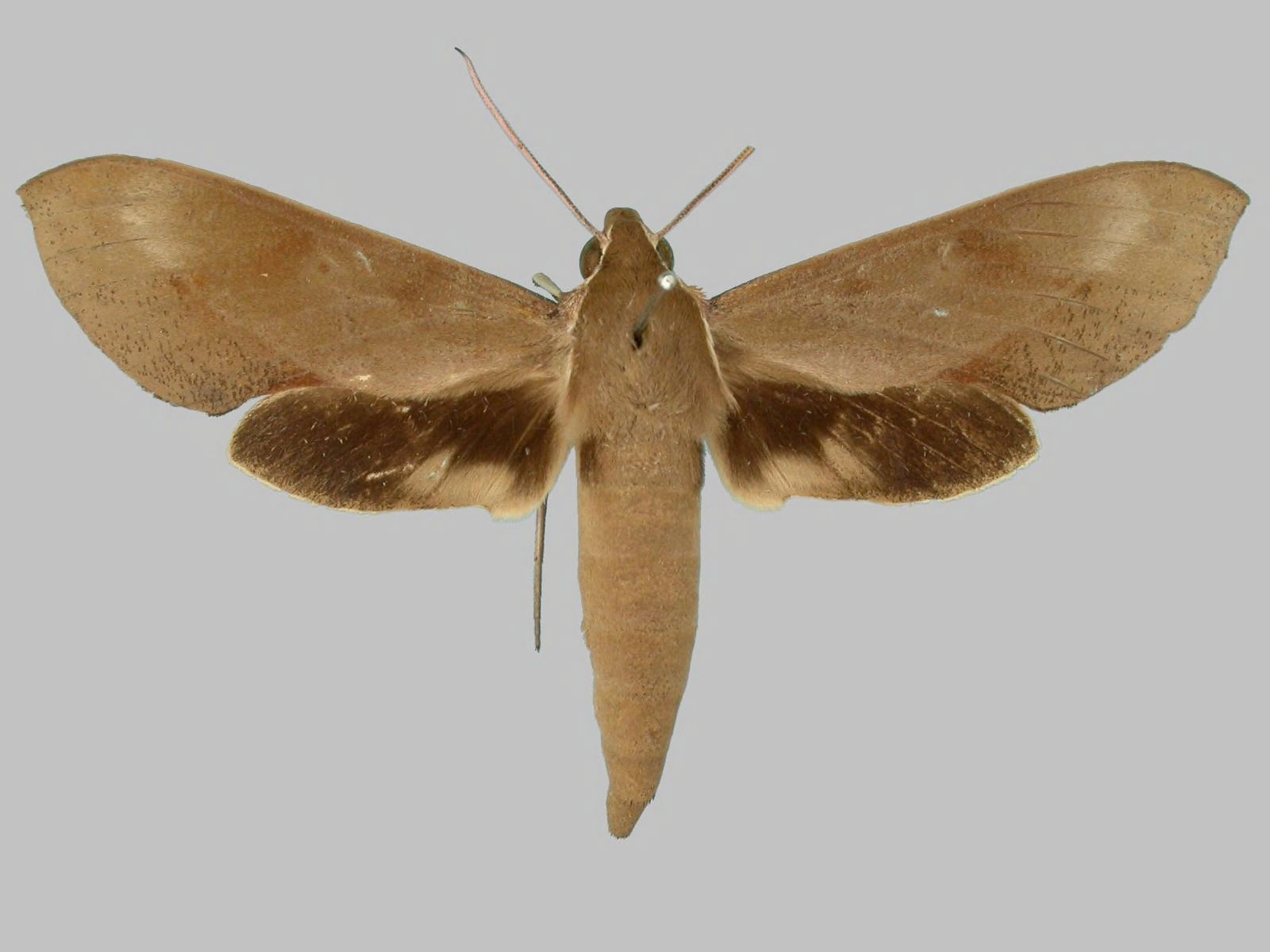

Scientific classification
- Domain: Eukaryota
- Kingdom: Animalia
- Phylum: Arthropoda
- Class: Insecta
- Order: Lepidoptera
- Family: Sphingidae
- Genus: Xylophanes
- Species: X. rhodocera

Binomial name
- Xylophanes rhodocera (Walker, 1856)

Synonyms
- Darapsa rhodocera Walker, 1856; Xylophanes sublaevis Joicey & Kaye, 1917

= Xylophanes rhodocera =

Species of moth

Xylophanes rhodocera is a moth of the family Sphingidae. It is known from Haiti and the Dominican Republic.

The dorsal scales of the antennae are pink. The outer margin of the forewing is strongly convex. The forewing upperside pattern is very uniform. There is a slightly brownish patch present near the end of the discal cell and another smaller one is occasionally present in the middle of the cell. The disco-marginal area is dusted with brown scales, especially posteriorly.

Adults are probably on wing year-round.

The larvae probably feed on Rubiaceae and Malvaceae species.
