= Ethmia nivosella =

Scientific classification
- Kingdom: Animalia
- Phylum: Arthropoda
- Class: Insecta
- Order: Lepidoptera
- Family: Depressariidae
- Genus: Ethmia
- Species: E. nivosella

Binomial name
- Ethmia nivosella (Walker, 1864)

Synonyms
- Tamarrha nivosella Walker, 1864; Psecadia nivosella; Tamarrha niveosella; Psecadia adustella Zeller, 1877; Ethmia adustella

Species of moth

Ethmia nivosella is a moth in the family Depressariidae. It is found in the West Indies, from Jamaica and eastern Cuba to the Bahamas and Puerto Rico. It might also be present in Haiti, the Dominican Republic and Trinidad.

The length of the forewings is 8.3–10.5 mm (0.33–0.41 in). The basal area and broad dorsal blotch on the forewings are purplish bronzy, reflecting metallic purplish. The ground color of the hindwings is whitish, becoming pale brownish distally. Adults are on wing from January to March (in Jamaica), in July (Jamaica and Puerto Rico) and in October (in Cuba).
