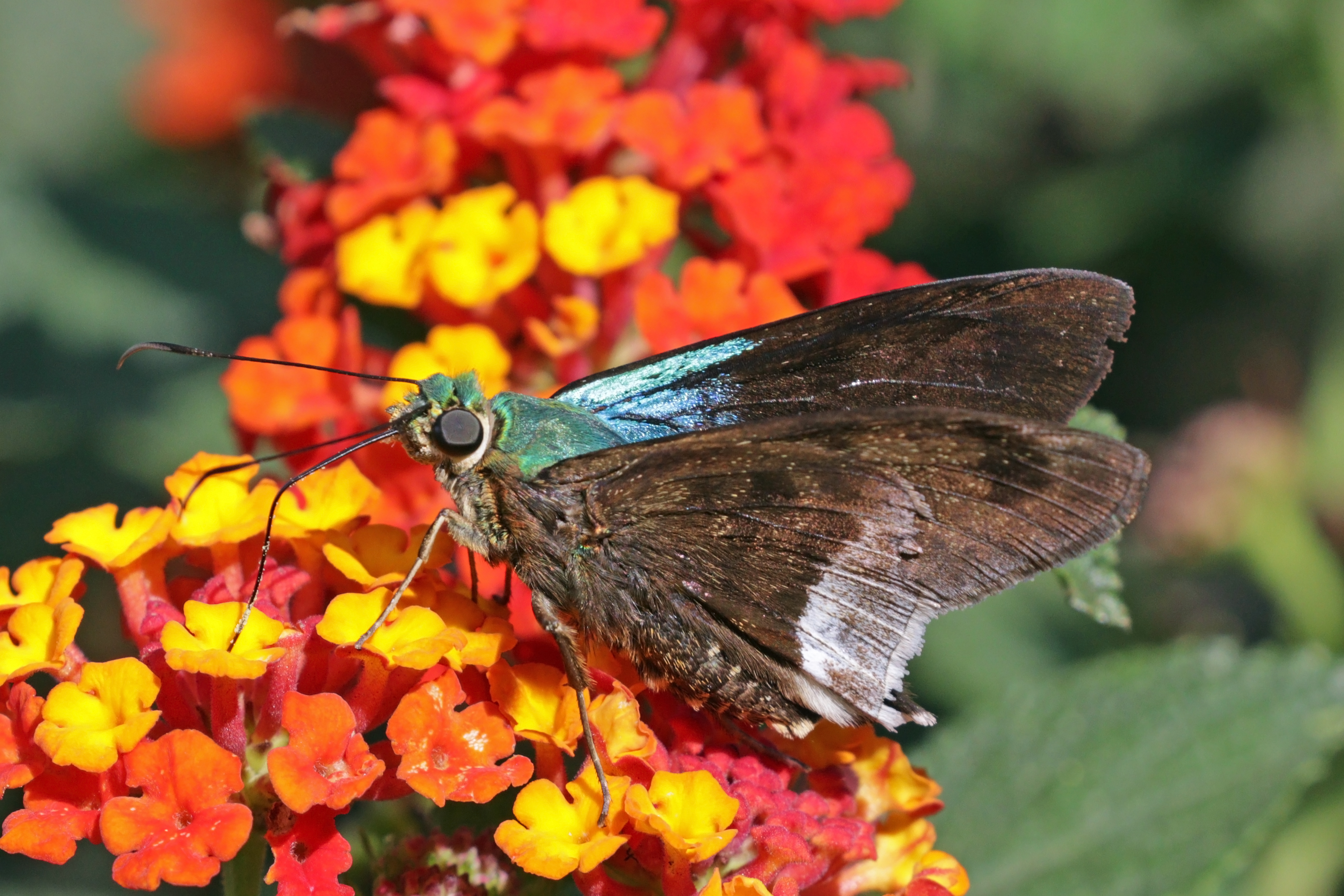
- T. a. latia in Costa Rica

Scientific classification
- Kingdom: Animalia
- Phylum: Arthropoda
- Class: Insecta
- Order: Lepidoptera
- Family: Hesperiidae
- Genus: Telegonus
- Species: T. alardus

Binomial name
- Telegonus alardus (Stoll, 1790)

Synonyms
- Telegonus fabrici Ehrmann, 1918; Astraptes alardus (Stoll, 1790)

= Telegonus alardus =

Species of butterfly

Telegonus alardus, the frosted flasher, is a species of dicot skipper in the butterfly family Hesperiidae. It is found in the Caribbean Sea, Central America, North America, and South America.

== Subspecies ==
The following subspecies are recognised:

- Telegonus alardus alardus (Stoll, 1790)
- Telegonus alardus aquila Evans, 1952
- Telegonus alardus latia Evans, 1952
