= Ethmia kirbyi =

Scientific classification
- Domain: Eukaryota
- Kingdom: Animalia
- Phylum: Arthropoda
- Class: Insecta
- Order: Lepidoptera
- Family: Depressariidae
- Genus: Ethmia
- Species: E. kirbyi

Binomial name
- Ethmia kirbyi (Moeschler, 1890)

Synonyms
- Psecadia kirbyi Moeschler, 1890

Species of moth

Ethmia kirbyi is a moth in the family Depressariidae. It is found in Haiti and Puerto Rico.

The length of the forewings is 8.1–8.4 mm (0.32–0.33 in). The ground color of the forewings is white with gray-brown markings. The ground color of the hindwings is white, becoming brownish toward the apex. Adults are on wing in February (in Haiti) and in April and August (in Puerto Rico).
