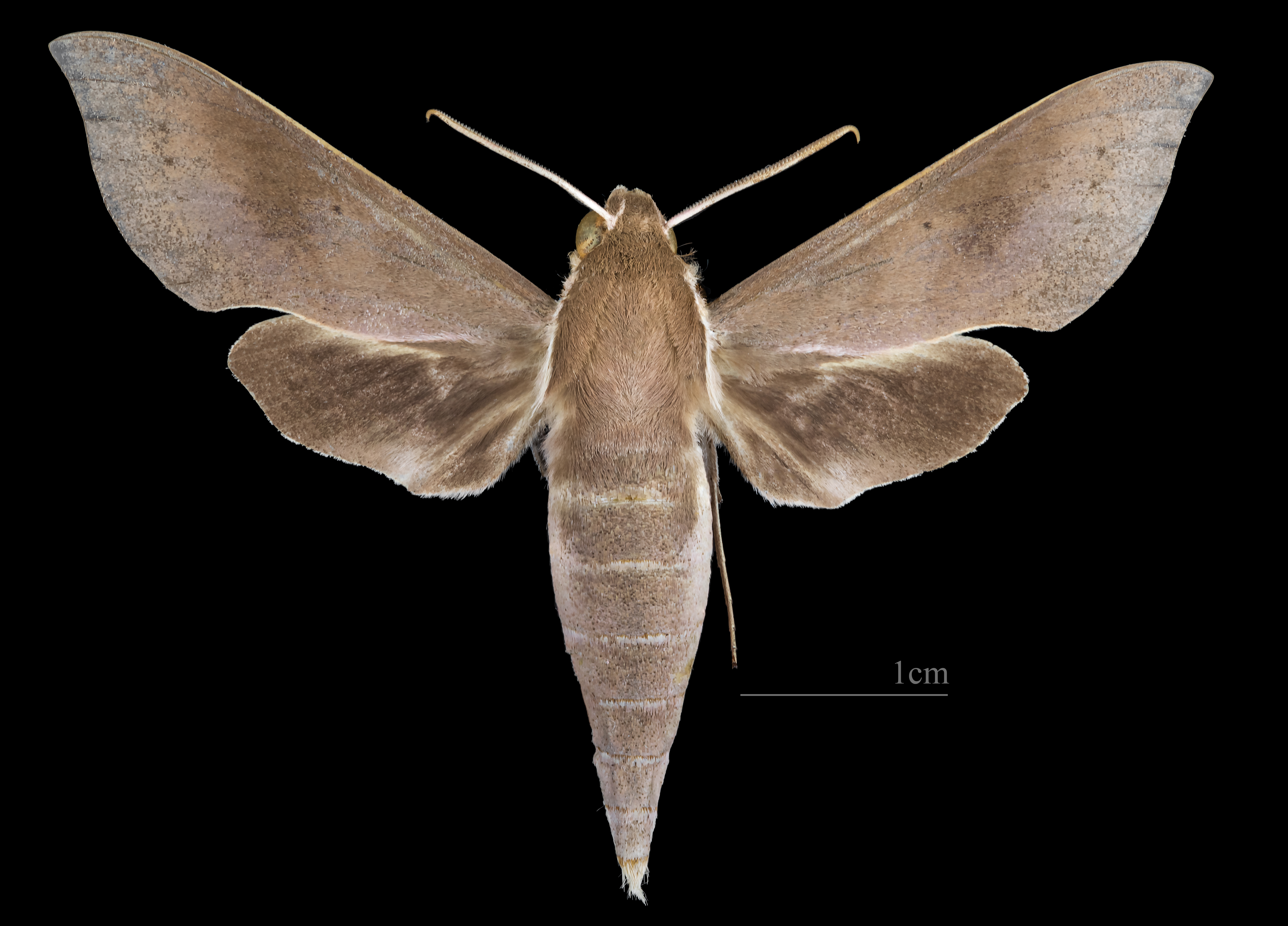
- Xylophanes porcus porcus ♂
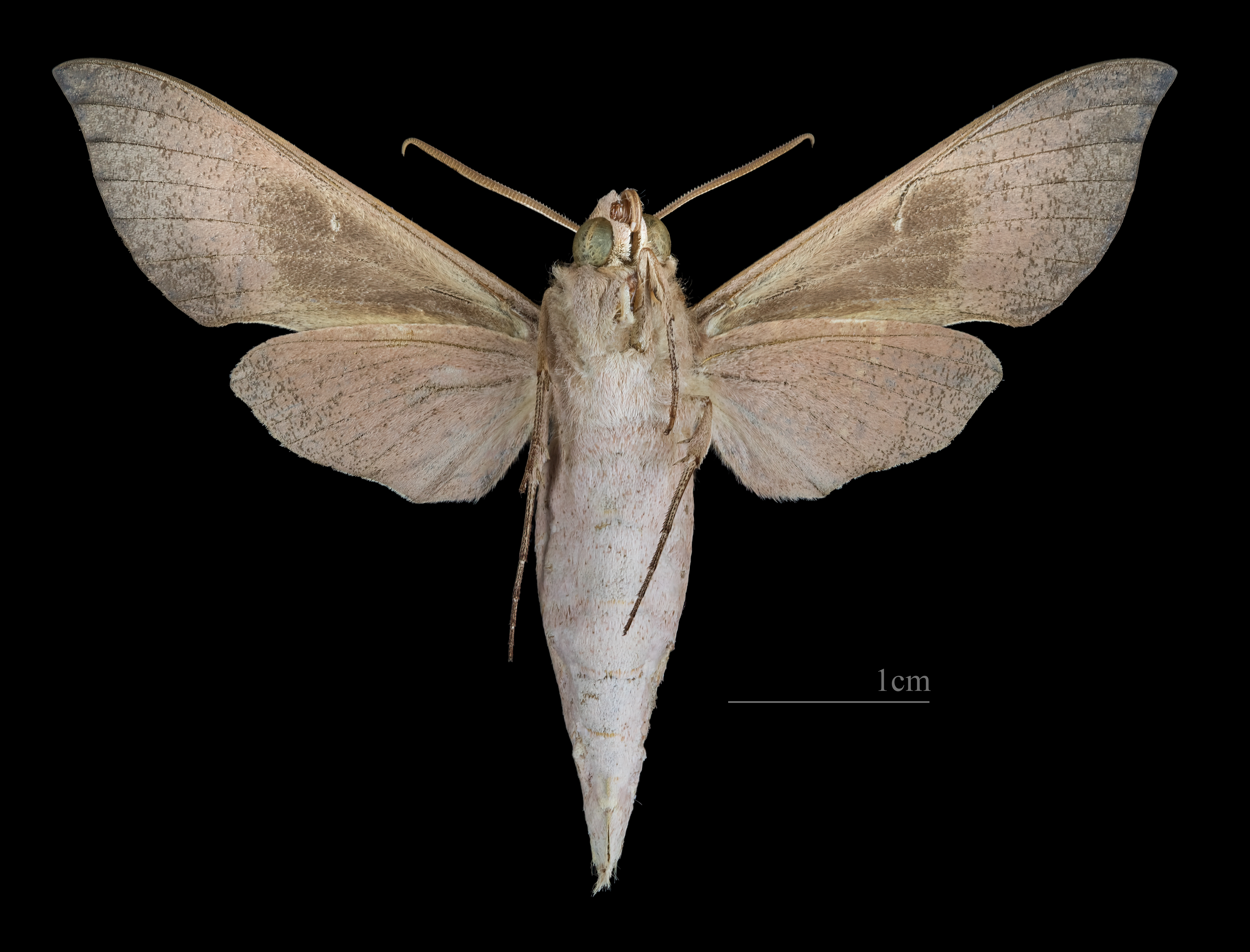
- Xylophanes porcus porcus ♂ ♀ △

Scientific classification
- Domain: Eukaryota
- Kingdom: Animalia
- Phylum: Arthropoda
- Class: Insecta
- Order: Lepidoptera
- Family: Sphingidae
- Genus: Xylophanes
- Species: X. porcus

Binomial name
- Xylophanes porcus (Hubner, 1823)

Synonyms
- Oreus porcus Hübner, 1823

= Xylophanes porcus =

Porcus sphinx

Species of moth

Xylophanes porcus, the porcus sphinx, is a moth of the family Sphingidae. The family was first described by Jacob Hübner in 1823.

== Distribution ==
It is found from Florida south to Bolivia.

== Description ==
The wingspan is 70–79 mm. The forewing upperside has a distinct discal spot. The antemedian and postmedian bands are represented by diffuse olive-green clouds and the submarginal band is reduced to a single row of small dots.

== Biology ==
Adults are probably on wing year round in the tropics. They probably feed on flower nectar.

The larvae of the nominate subspecies feed on Hamelia patens, Psychotria horizontalis, Psychotria pubescens, Psychotria microdon and Palicourea grandifolia. The larvae of subspecies continentalis probably feed on Rubiaceae and Malvaceae species.

== Subspecie s ==
- Xylophanes porcus porcus (Florida south to French Guiana and Venezuela)
- Xylophanes porcus continentalis Rothschild & Jordan, 1903 (Mexico and Belize south across northern South America (including Colombia) to French Guiana. Also recorded from Bolivia)
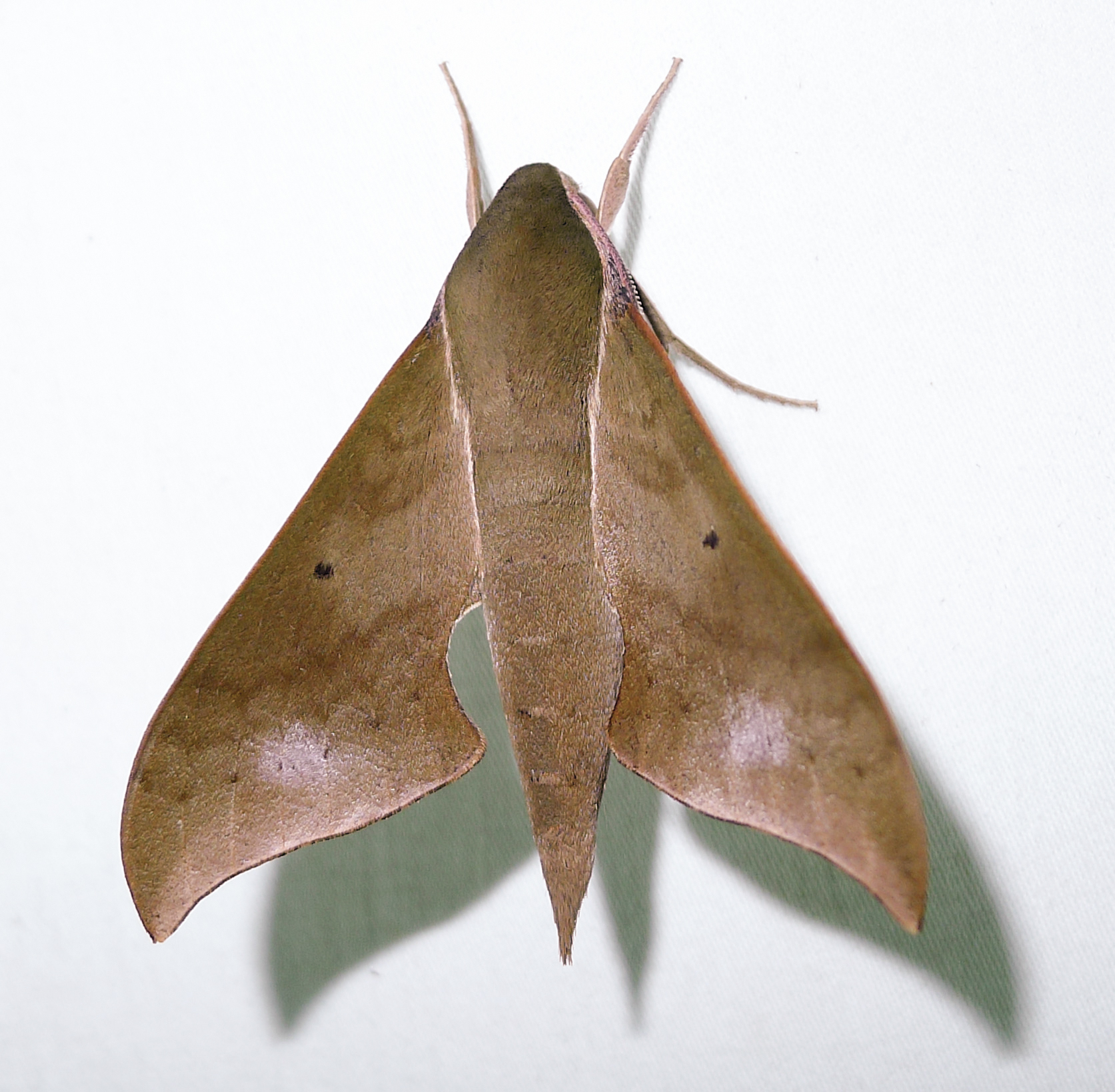
Xylophanes porcus continentalis

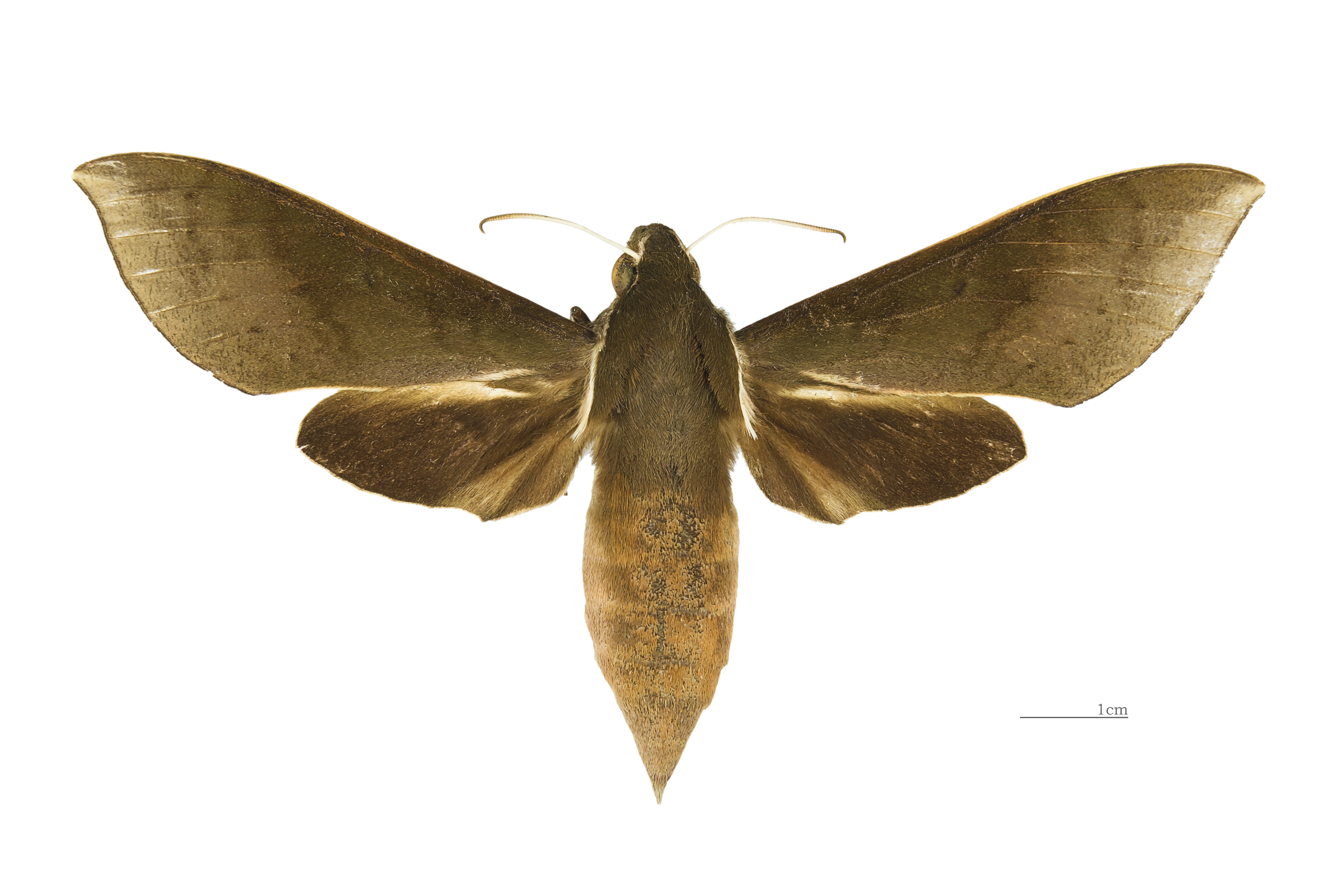
Xylophanes porcus continentalis Dorsal side.

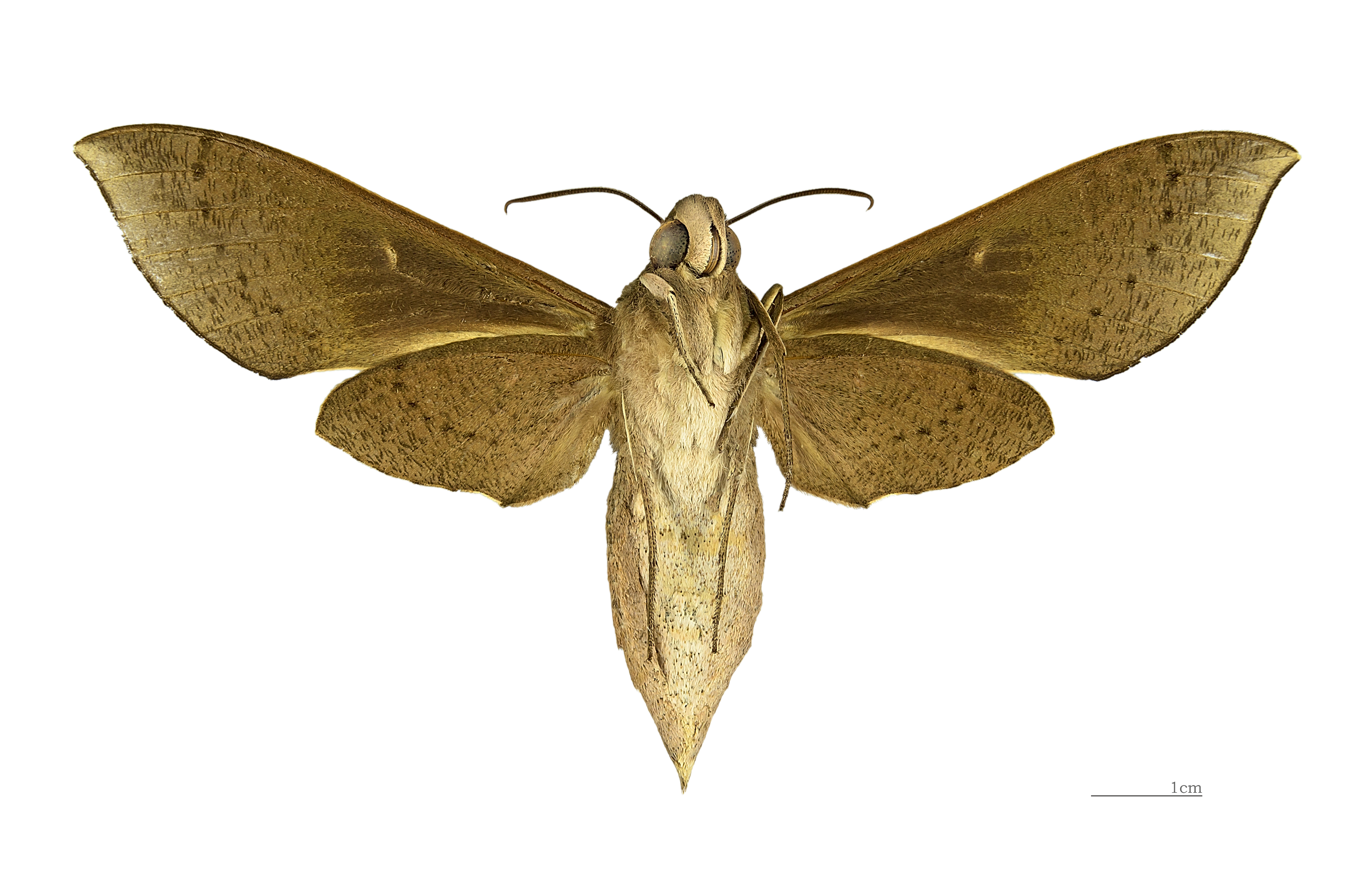
Xylophanes porcus continentalis △ Ventral side.
