= Chobata =

Scientific classification
- Kingdom: Animalia
- Phylum: Arthropoda
- Clade: Pancrustacea
- Class: Insecta
- Order: Lepidoptera
- Superfamily: Noctuoidea
- Family: Noctuidae
- Subfamily: Acontiinae
- Genus: Chobata; Walker, [1858]
- Species: C. discalis

Binomial name
- Chobata discalis Walker, [1858]

Genus of moths

Chobata is a monotypic moth genus of the family Noctuidae. Its only species, Chobata discalis, is found in the Dominican Republic. Both the genus and species were first described by Francis Walker in 1858.
