= Ethmia confusella =

Scientific classification
- Kingdom: Animalia
- Phylum: Arthropoda
- Class: Insecta
- Order: Lepidoptera
- Family: Depressariidae
- Genus: Ethmia
- Species: E. confusella

Binomial name
- Ethmia confusella (Walker, 1863)

Synonyms
- Hyponomeuta confusellus Walker, 1863; Cryptolechia strigosella Walker, 1864; Psecadia strigosella; Psecadia ingricella Moeschler, 1890; Ethmia ingricella

Species of moth

Ethmia confusella is a moth in the family Depressariidae. It is found from the Florida Keys and Bahamas, through the Greater Antilles to the Yucatan Peninsula, and through the Lesser Antilles to Trinidad.

The length of the forewings is 8–10.8 mm (0.31–0.43 in). The ground color of the forewings is whitish, usually mostly dusted by pale grayish. The markings are blackish or dark gray-brown. The ground color of the hindwings is white and semi translucent and brownish at the apex. Adults are on wing in July and December (in Jamaica), April and June (in Puerto Rico), July and October (the Virgin Islands), March, May and August (on Dominica). There are probably multiple generations per year.

The larvae feed on Bourreria ovata.
