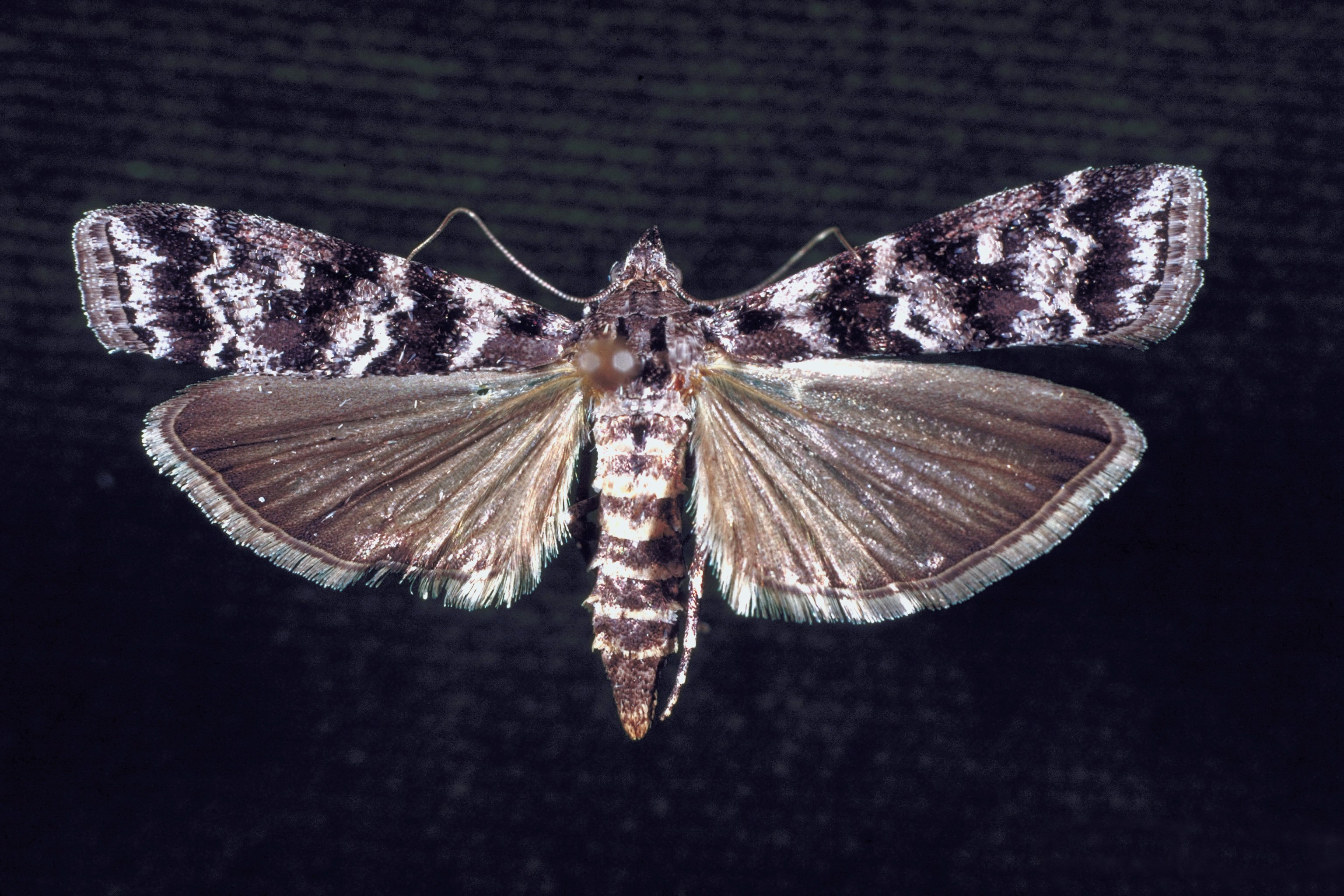

Scientific classification
- Kingdom: Animalia
- Phylum: Arthropoda
- Class: Insecta
- Order: Lepidoptera
- Family: Pyralidae
- Genus: Dioryctria
- Species: D. amatella

Binomial name
- Dioryctria amatella (Hulst, 1887)

Synonyms
- Nephopteryx amatella Hulst, 1887

= Dioryctria amatella =

Southern pineconeworm moth

Species of moth

Dioryctria amatella, the southern pineconeworm moth, is a species of moth of the family Pyralidae. It is found in the south-eastern United States, from Maryland south to Florida and west into Texas.

The wingspan is 27–32 mm. There are one to four generations per year, with adults on wing from early April to early November.

== Gallery ==
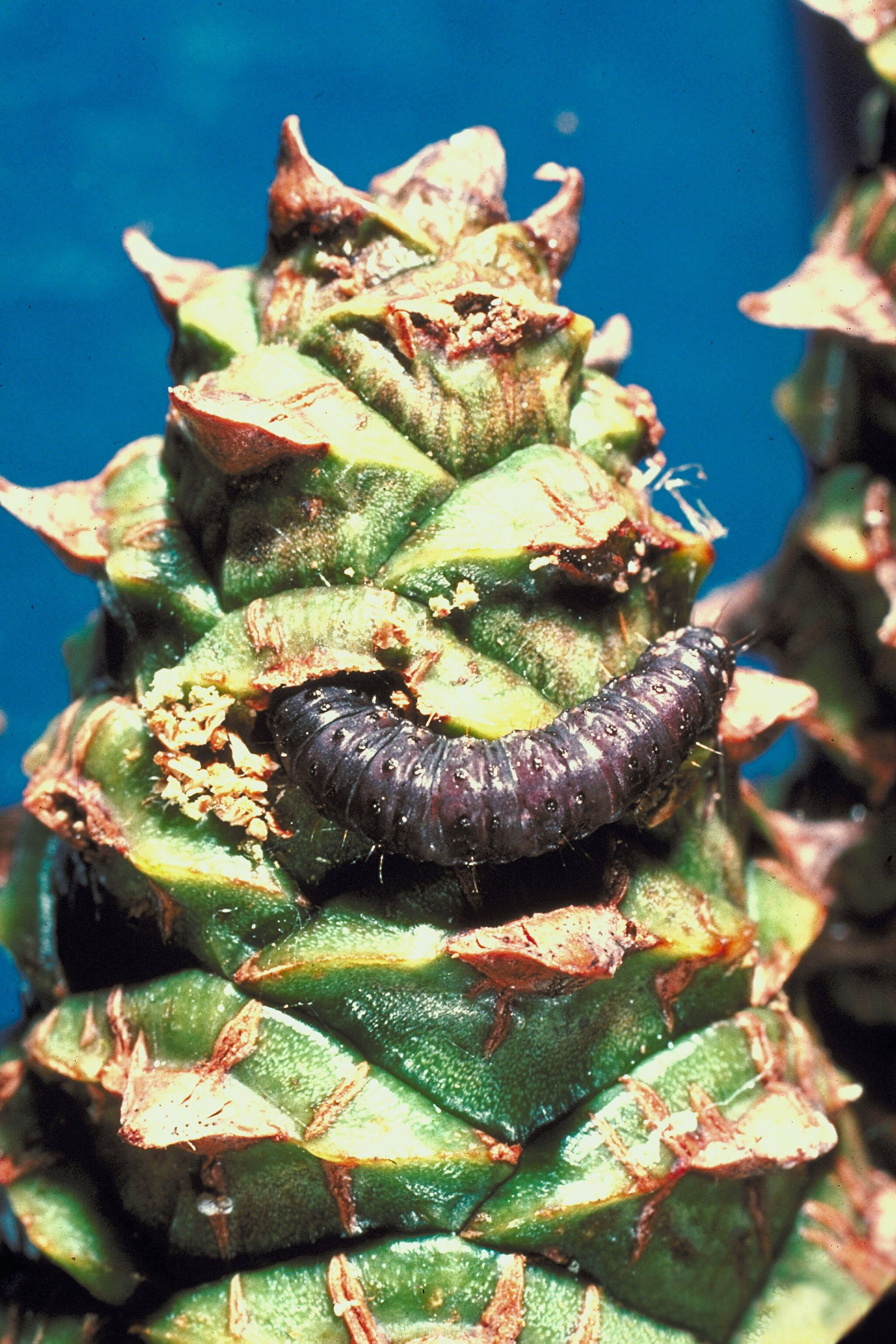
Larva

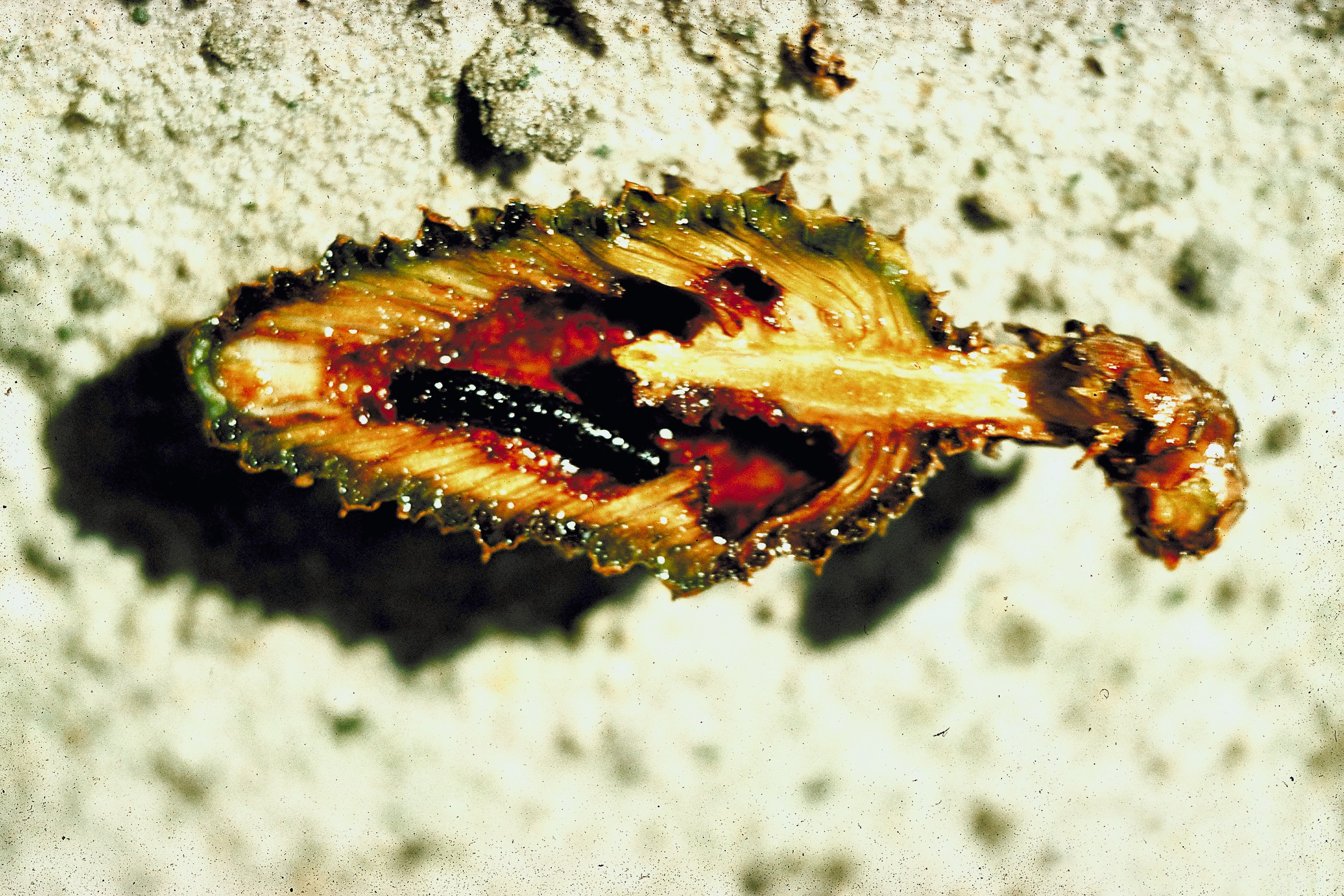
Larva

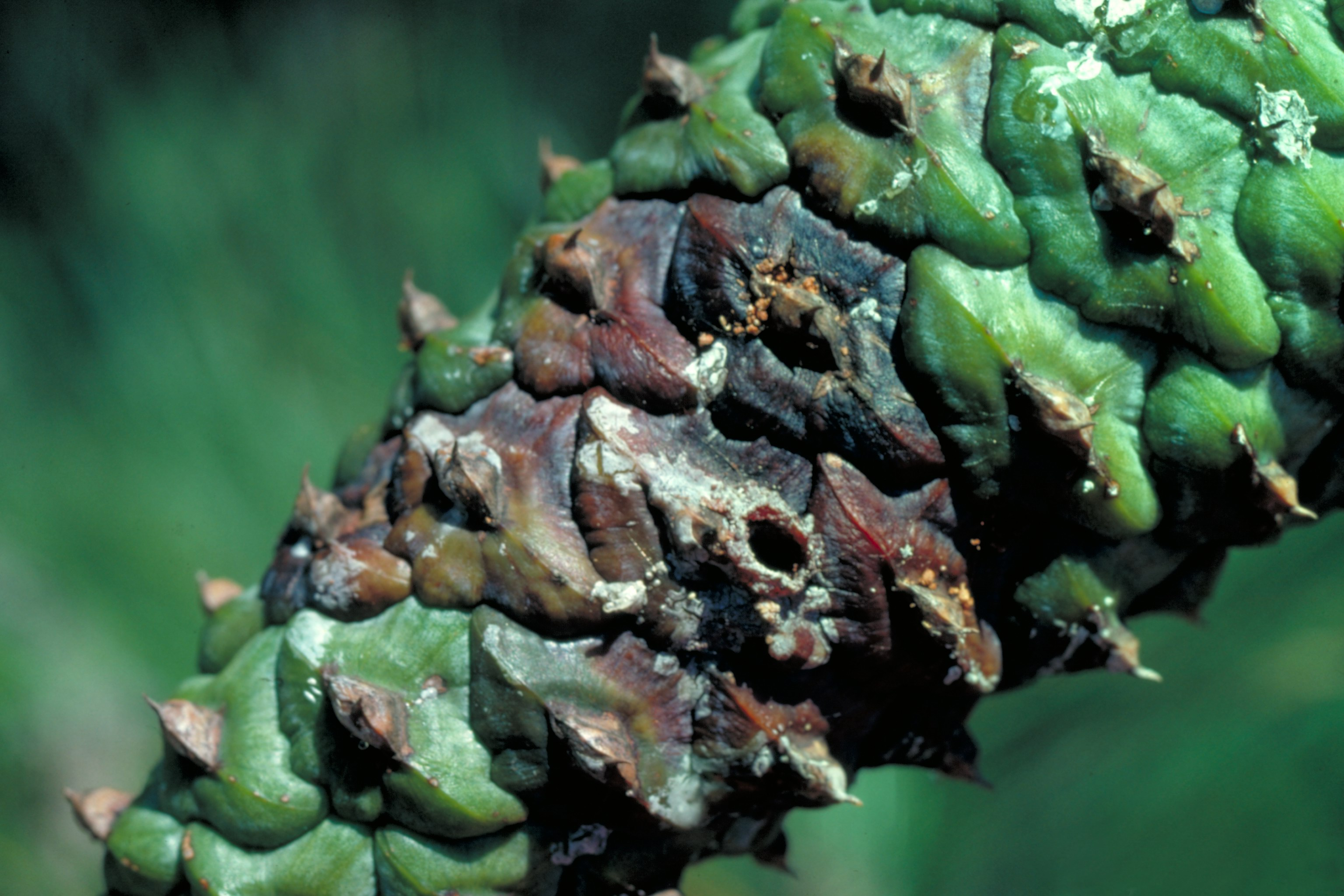
Damage

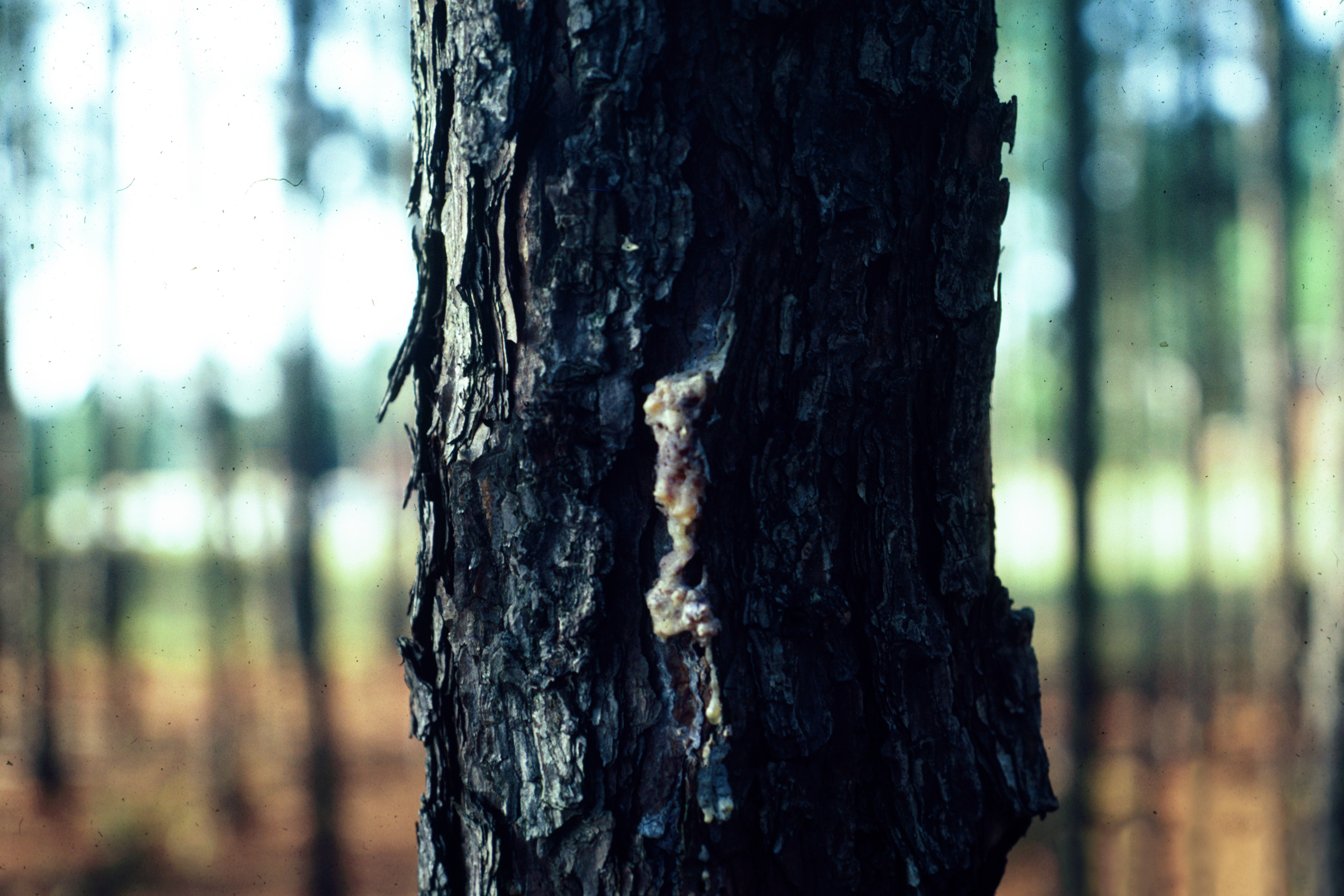
Damage

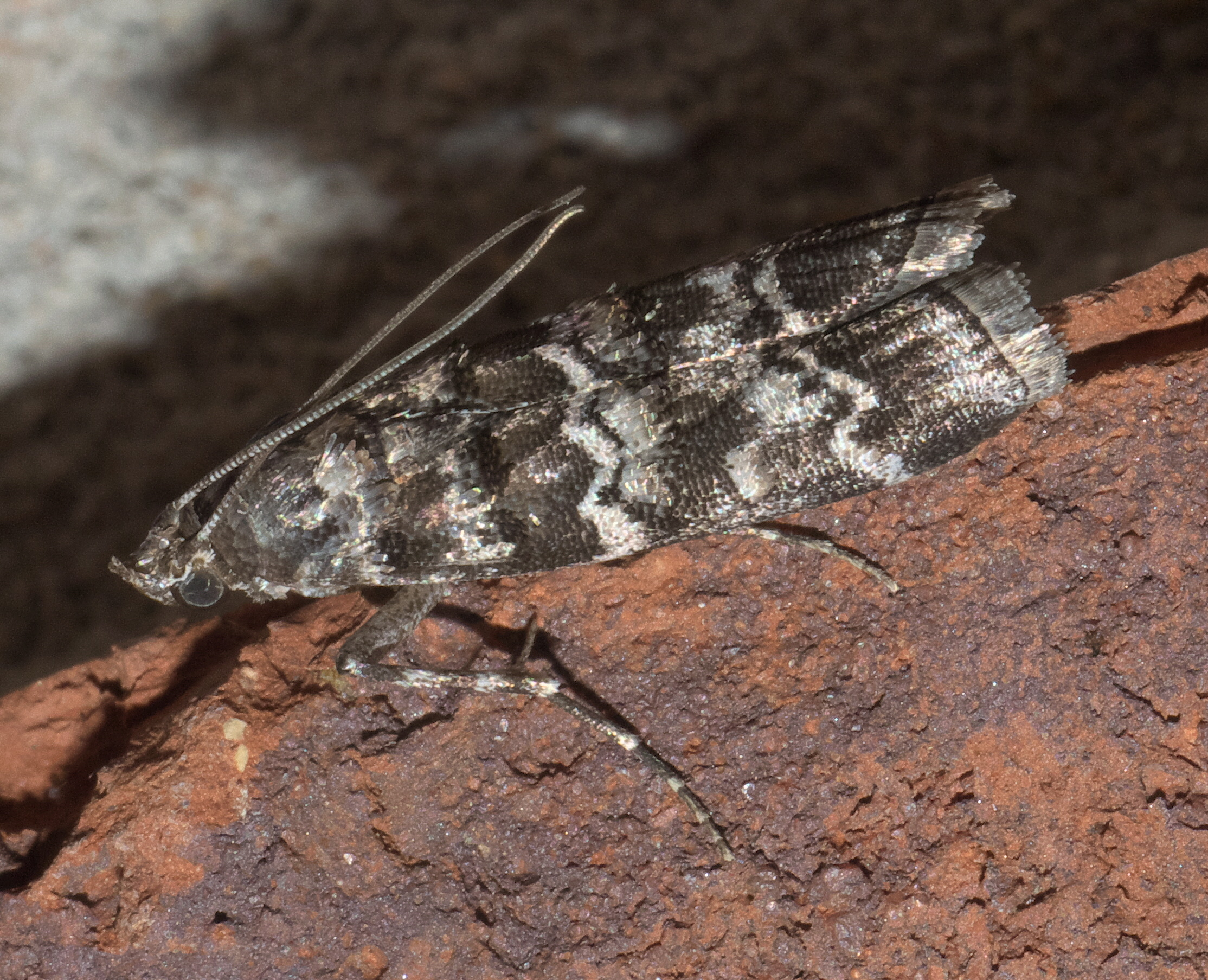
Adult

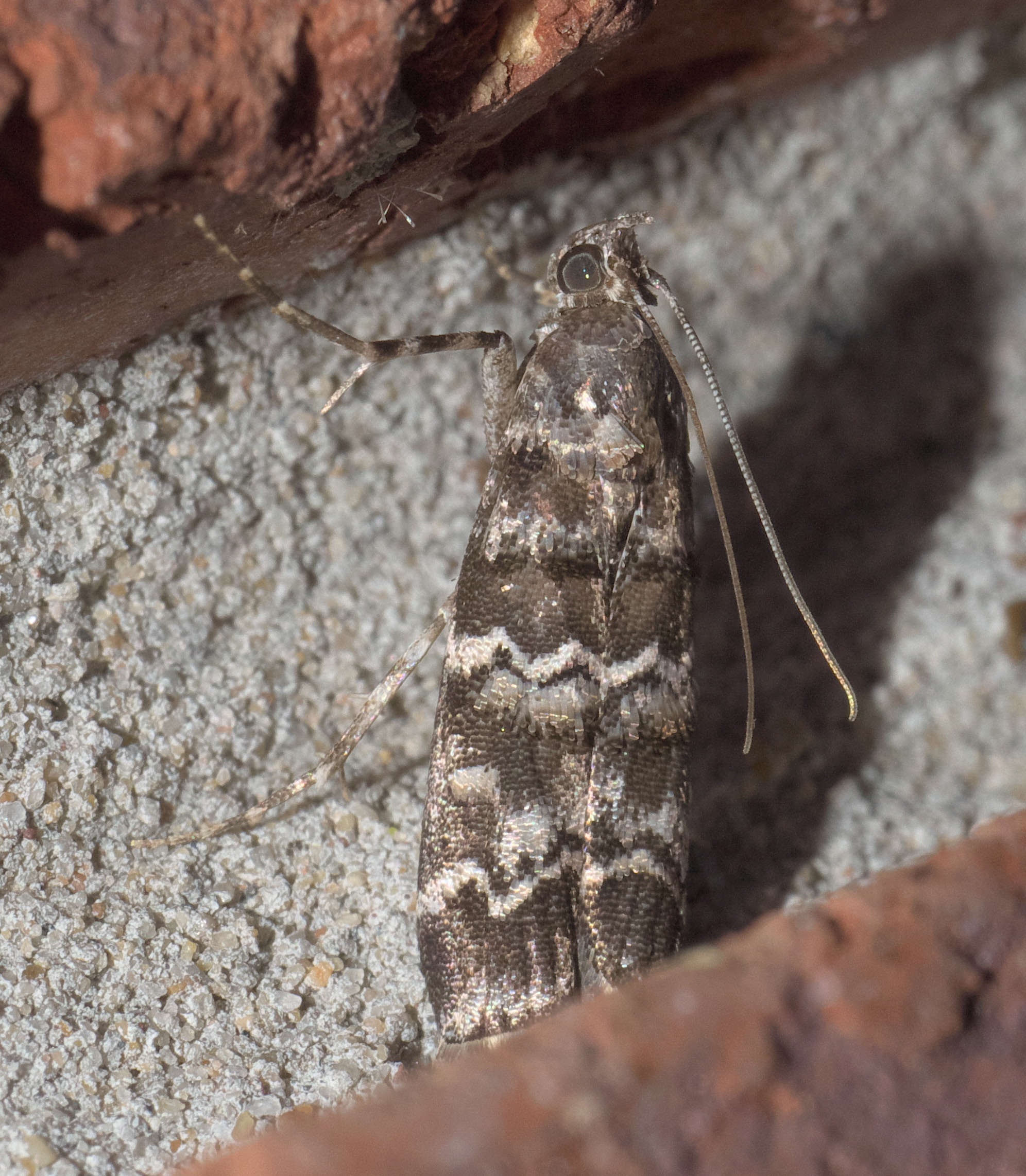
Adult
