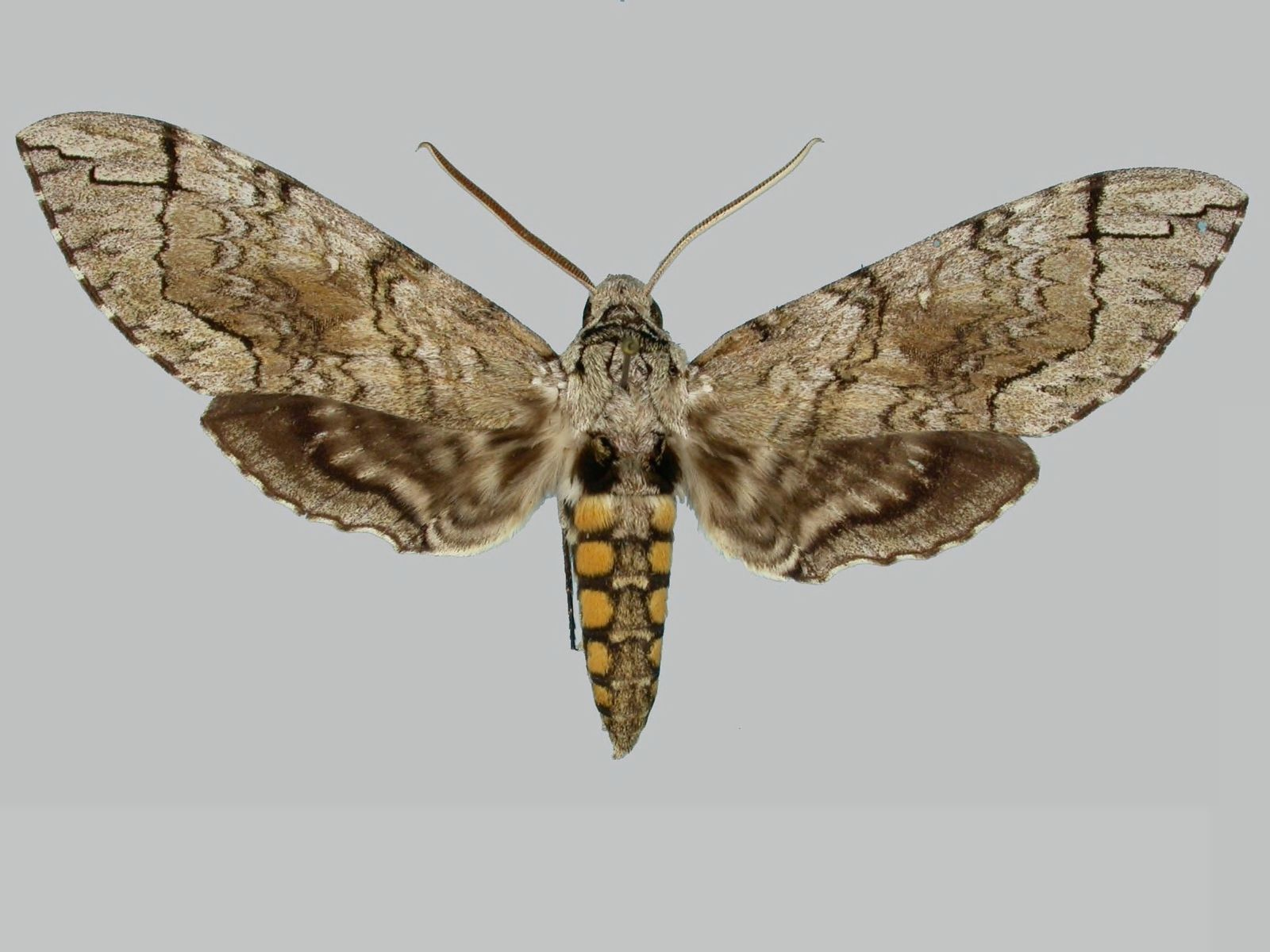
- Male

Scientific classification
- Kingdom: Animalia
- Phylum: Arthropoda
- Class: Insecta
- Order: Lepidoptera
- Family: Sphingidae
- Genus: Manduca
- Species: M. caribbeus

Binomial name
- Manduca caribbeus (Cary, 1952)

Synonyms
- Phlegethontius caribbeus Cary, 1952

= Manduca caribbeus =

Species of moth

Manduca caribbeus is a moth of the family Sphingidae. It is known from Haiti and the Dominican Republic.

The wingspan is 80–85 mm. Adults have been recorded from May to June.
