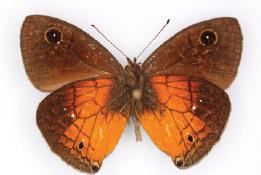

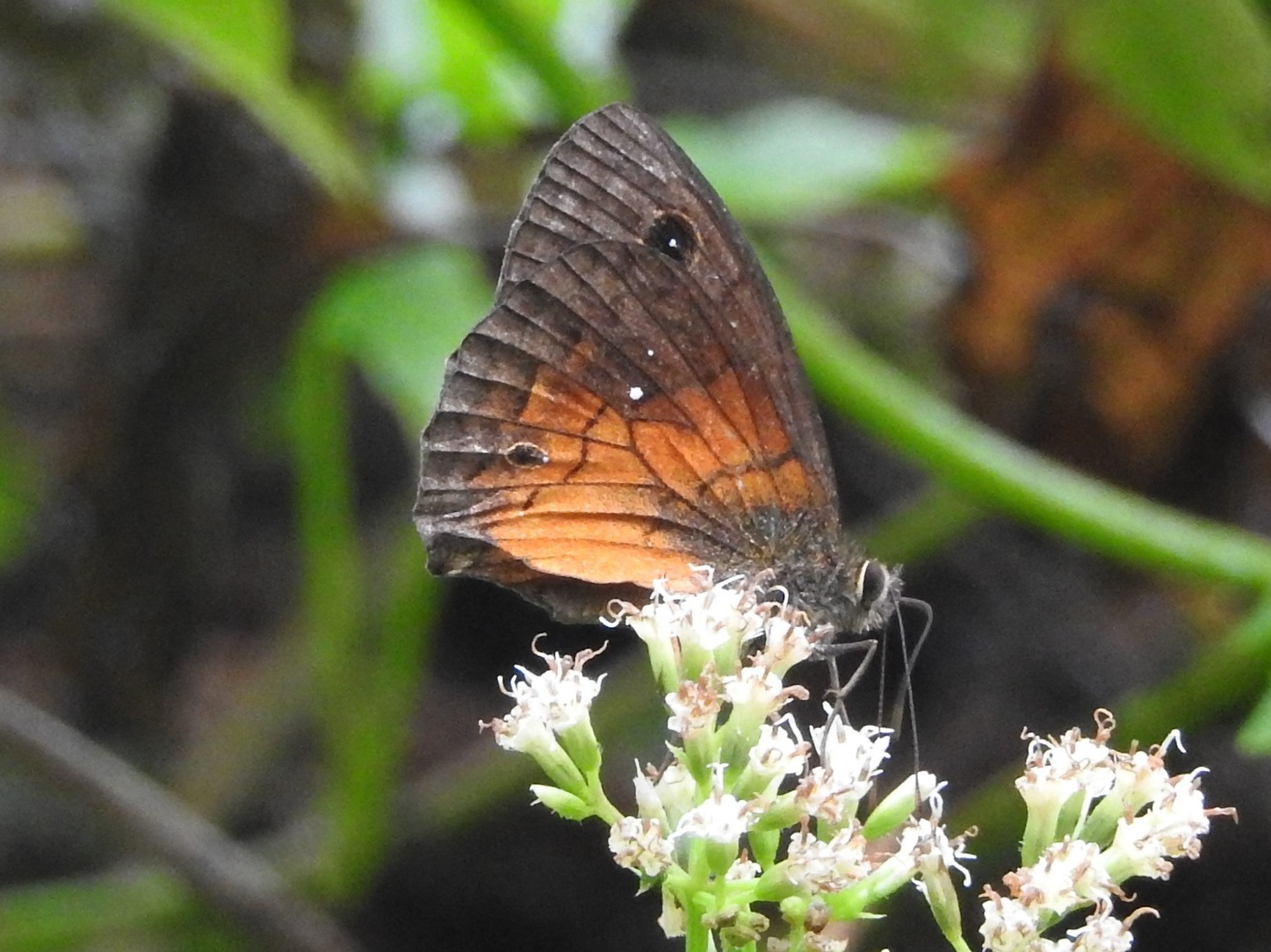

Scientific classification
- Domain: Eukaryota
- Kingdom: Animalia
- Phylum: Arthropoda
- Class: Insecta
- Order: Lepidoptera
- Family: Nymphalidae
- Genus: Calisto
- Species: C. pulchella

Binomial name
- Calisto pulchella Lathy, 1899

Synonyms
- Calisto pulchella ab. tenebrosa Lathy, 1899

= Calisto pulchella =

Species of butterfly

Calisto pulchella, also known as the Sugar Cane Calisto, is a butterfly of the family Nymphalidae. Described by Percy Ireland Lathy in 1899, it is endemic to Hispaniola.

The larvae are a pest on sugarcane, but the native host plant is unknown.

== Subspecies ==
- Calisto pulchella pulchella (lowland)
- Calisto pulchella darlingtoni Clench, 1943 (Cordillera Central)
