= Oncolabis =

Scientific classification
- Kingdom: Animalia
- Phylum: Arthropoda
- Clade: Pancrustacea
- Class: Insecta
- Order: Lepidoptera
- Family: Pyralidae
- Subfamily: Phycitinae
- Genus: Oncolabis; Zeller, 1848
- Species: O. anticella

Binomial name
- Oncolabis anticella Zeller, 1848

Synonyms
- Genus: Endommmasis Hampson in Ragonot, 1901; Species: Endommmasis nigritella Hampson in Ragonot, 1901

Genus of moths

Oncolabis is a small genus of snout moth genus described by Philipp Christoph Zeller in 1848. Its type species, Oncolabis anticella, described in the same article, is known from Brazil.

The genus includes:

- Oncolabis anticella
- Oncolabis endopyrella
- Oncolabis fuliginosus
- Oncolabis ignidorsella
- Oncolabis ignifatua
- Oncolabis rubripurpurea
