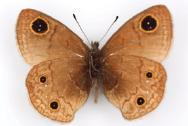
- Calisto grannus grannus

Scientific classification
- Domain: Eukaryota
- Kingdom: Animalia
- Phylum: Arthropoda
- Class: Insecta
- Order: Lepidoptera
- Family: Nymphalidae
- Genus: Calisto
- Species: C. grannus

Binomial name
- Calisto grannus Bates, 1939

Synonyms
- Calisto amazona González, 1987; Calisto dystacta González, 1987; Calisto micheneri Clench, 1944; Calisto micrommata Schwartz & Gali, 1984; Calisto phoinix González, 1987; Calisto sommeri Schwartz & Gali, 1984

= Calisto grannus =

Species of butterfly

Calisto grannus is a butterfly of the family Nymphalidae. It is endemic to Hispaniola, where it is generally found on altitudes above 1000 meters.

The larvae feed on various grasses.

== Subspecies ==
- Calisto grannus grannus
- Calisto grannus amazona González, 1987
- Calisto grannus dilemma González, 1987
- Calisto grannus dystacta González, 1987
- Calisto grannus micheneri Clench, 1944
- Calisto grannus micrommata Schwartz & Gali, 1984
- Calisto grannus phoinix González, 1987
- Calisto grannus sommeri Schwartz & Gali, 1984

== Gallery ==
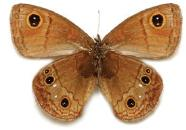
Calisto grannus amazona

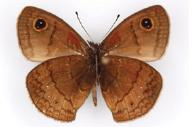
Calisto grannus dilemma

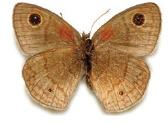
Calisto grannus micheneri

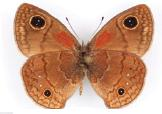
Calisto grannus phoinix

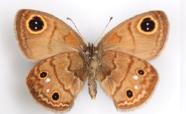
Calisto grannus sommeri
