= Anypsipyla =

Scientific classification
- Kingdom: Animalia
- Phylum: Arthropoda
- Class: Insecta
- Order: Lepidoptera
- Family: Pyralidae
- Genus: Anypsipyla; Dyar, 1914
- Species: A. univitella

Binomial name
- Anypsipyla univitella Dyar, 1914

Genus of moths

Anypsipyla is a monotypic snout moth genus described by Harrison Gray Dyar Jr. in 1914. Its only species, Anypsipyla univitella, was described by the same author in the same year. It is found in Central America (including Panama, Costa Rica and Guatemala), South America (Venezuela, Brazil, Peru and Ecuador) and has also been recorded from Cuba, Mexico, Jamaica and Florida in the southern United States.

The larvae feed on Samanea saman. They damage the seeds and pods of their host plant.
