= Argyrotaenia ceramica =

Scientific classification
- Kingdom: Animalia
- Phylum: Arthropoda
- Clade: Pancrustacea
- Class: Insecta
- Order: Lepidoptera
- Family: Tortricidae
- Genus: Argyrotaenia
- Species: A. ceramica

Binomial name
- Argyrotaenia ceramica Razowski, 1999

Species of moth

Argyrotaenia ceramica is a species of moth of the family Tortricidae. Adults of the species have a forewing length of 5.0–8.5 mm (0.20–0.33 in) and a wingspan of 14–17 mm (0.55–0.67 in). It is native to the Caribbean islands of Hispaniola and Cuba; it is widespread on the former island, but has only been documented from high elevations in Santiago de Cuba. It is an inhabitant of cloud forests, pine forests, grasslands, broadleaf forests, and grasslands at elevations of 700–2,200 m (2,000–7,000 ft).

== Taxonomy ==
Argyrotaenia ceramica was formally described by the Polish entomologist Józef Razowski in 1999 based on a male collected from the northeastern Los Arroyos sector of the Sierra de Bahoruco National Park. In 2010, Razowski and the Brazilian entomologist Vitor Becker described A. granpiedrae as a new species based on specimens collected from Santiago de Cuba. A 2020 study found that despite significant genetic divergence between A. ceramica and A. granpiedrae, the two taxa were morphologically identical, and demoted to a subspecies of A. ceramica. A. ceramica is fairly distinct from all other Caribbean species in its genus and seems to be part of the A. ponera species group, which is otherwise native to the southwestern US and Mexico.

== Description ==
Argyrotaenia ceramica has an appearance that is fairly typical for members of its genus. Adults of the species have a forewing length of 5.0–8.5 mm (0.20–0.33 in) and a wingspan of 14–17 mm (0.55–0.67 in). The head is broadly yellow to ochre-orange in color. The thorax is broadly brown-yellow. The narrow forewing is cream-yellow markings. The underside of the forewing is pale brown towards the body and a lighter yellow towards the tip. The hindwing is light yellow-white maculated with pale brown.

== Distribution and habitat ==
Argyrotaenia ceramica is native to the Caribbean islands of Hispaniola and Cuba. In Hispaniola, it has been documented from the Independencia, Elías Piña, La Vega, Pedernales, and Peravia provinces of the Dominican Republic, as well as the Sud and Ouest departments of Haiti. The moth inhabits cloud forests, pine forests, grasslands, broadleaf forests, and grasslands at elevations of 700–2,200 m (2,000–7,000 ft) on Hispaniola. On Cuba, it is known only from high elevations in Santiago de Cuba.
