= Scopula micrata =

Scientific classification
- Kingdom: Animalia
- Phylum: Arthropoda
- Class: Insecta
- Order: Lepidoptera
- Family: Geometridae
- Genus: Scopula
- Species: S. micrata

Binomial name
- Scopula micrata (Guenée, [1858])

Synonyms
- Acidalia micrata Guenee, 1858

Species of geometer moth in subfamily Sterrhinae

Scopula micrata is a moth of the family Geometridae. It is found on Haiti.
