= Udea secernalis =

Scientific classification
- Domain: Eukaryota
- Kingdom: Animalia
- Phylum: Arthropoda
- Class: Insecta
- Order: Lepidoptera
- Family: Crambidae
- Genus: Udea
- Species: U. secernalis

Binomial name
- Udea secernalis (Möschler, 1890)

Synonyms
- Botys secernalis Möschler, 1890

Species of moth

Udea secernalis is a moth in the family Crambidae. It was described by Heinrich Benno Möschler in 1890. It is found in Puerto Rico, Jamaica and on Hispaniola.
