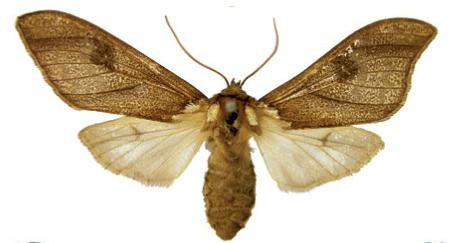

Scientific classification
- Domain: Eukaryota
- Kingdom: Animalia
- Phylum: Arthropoda
- Class: Insecta
- Order: Lepidoptera
- Superfamily: Noctuoidea
- Family: Erebidae
- Subfamily: Arctiinae
- Genus: Lophocampa
- Species: L. brunnea

Binomial name
- Lophocampa brunnea Vincent, 2011

Synonyms
- Lophocampa montana (Gaede, 1928); Lophocampa caryae form montana Gaede, 1928

= Lophocampa brunnea =

Species of moth

Lophocampa brunnea is a moth of the family Erebidae first described by Benoit Vincent in 2011. It is known from Guatemala.

== Taxonomy ==
Lophocampa caryae form montana was described from Guatemala. In the catalogue of Allan Watson and David T. Goodger, published in 1986, this form was associated with Lophocampa propinqua. However, the habitus of montana is totally different from Lophocampa caryae, Lophocampa propinqua and in fact all Lophocampa species. Thus montana was raised to species rank. However, Lophocampa montana (Gaede, 1928) then becomes a junior secondary homonym of Lophocampa montana (Schaus, 1911). It is now known by the replacement name Lophocampa brunnea.
