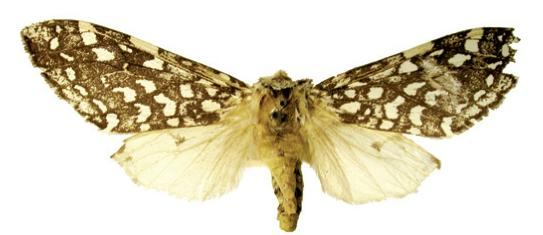

Scientific classification
- Kingdom: Animalia
- Phylum: Arthropoda
- Clade: Pancrustacea
- Class: Insecta
- Order: Lepidoptera
- Superfamily: Noctuoidea
- Family: Erebidae
- Subfamily: Arctiinae
- Genus: Lophocampa
- Species: L. albiguttata

Binomial name
- Lophocampa albiguttata (Boisduval, 1870)

Synonyms
- Phaegoptera albiguttata Boisduval, 1870; Lophocampa alternata; Halisidota albiguttata Godman & Salvin, 1884

= Lophocampa albiguttata =

Species of moth

Lophocampa albiguttata is a moth of the family Erebidae. It was described by Jean Baptiste Boisduval in 1870. It is known from Honduras and possibly Mexico.

== Taxonomy ==
Lophocampa albiguttata was treated as a synonym of Lophocampa alternata by Allan Watson and David T. Goodger in 1986. A comparison of the type material has revealed a clear difference in these two taxa, in particular the forewing pattern. Lophocampa albiguttata was therefore raised from synonymy in 2011. In the original description, Boisduval does not indicate the number of syntypes, based on specimens from Honduras. A female specimen from the Boisduval collection bears a label "Oaxaca", [Mexico] and a red "type" label. This specimen from Oaxaca may be a syntype of L. albiguttata, although the species was described from Honduras. A locality error in the original description or labelling error could explain this contradiction. As there is some doubt about the status of this supposed type, the designation of a lectotype or neotype is currently not possible. It is also possible that a syntype is stored in another collection. Finally, no specimens from Honduras have been located to serve as potential neotype.
