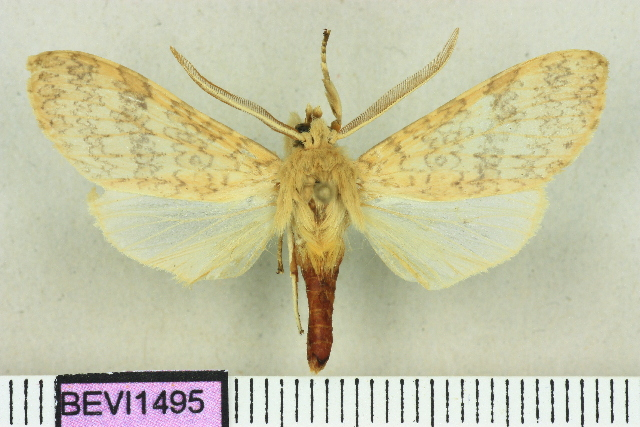

Scientific classification
- Domain: Eukaryota
- Kingdom: Animalia
- Phylum: Arthropoda
- Class: Insecta
- Order: Lepidoptera
- Superfamily: Noctuoidea
- Family: Erebidae
- Subfamily: Arctiinae
- Genus: Lophocampa
- Species: L. secunda

Binomial name
- Lophocampa secunda Vincent, 2009

Synonyms
- Syntarctia fasciata Rothschild, 1909; Syntarctia fasciatus Rothschild, 1910

= Lophocampa secunda =

Species of moth

Lophocampa secunda is a moth of the family Erebidae. It was described by Walter Rothschild in 1909 under the name fasciata. It is found in Brazil and on Cuba.

Wingspan is 28 mm.

== Taxonomy ==
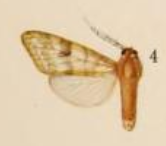
Syntarctia fasciata

Since L. fasciata is preoccupied by Euhalisidota fasciata, described by Augustus Radcliffe Grote in 1867, Lophocampa secunda was proposed by Benoît Vincent in 2009 as the replacement name.
