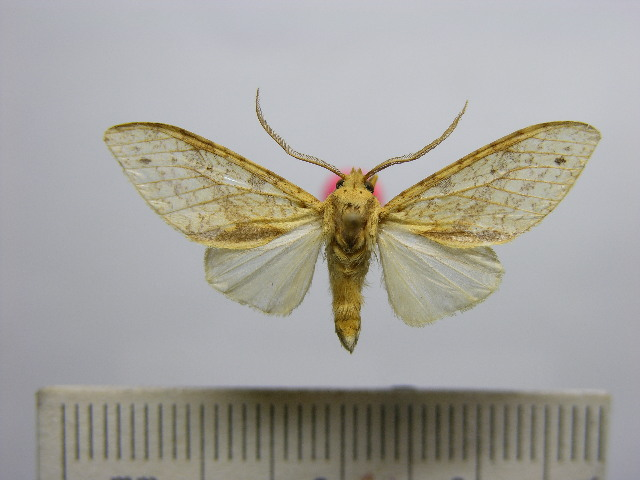

Scientific classification
- Domain: Eukaryota
- Kingdom: Animalia
- Phylum: Arthropoda
- Class: Insecta
- Order: Lepidoptera
- Superfamily: Noctuoidea
- Family: Erebidae
- Subfamily: Arctiinae
- Genus: Lophocampa
- Species: L. debilis

Binomial name
- Lophocampa debilis (Schaus, 1920)

Synonyms
- Thalesa debilis Schaus, 1920

= Lophocampa debilis =

Species of moth

Lophocampa debilis is a moth of the family Erebidae. It was described by William Schaus in 1920. It is found in Mexico, Costa Rica and Guatemala.

== Description ==
Male. Body and forewings pale brownish yellow, whitish at base of abdomen dorsally; black points on tegulae; forewings crossed by numerous wavy brown lines; antemedial line defined by grayish shadings, a medial line similarly shaded from subcostal vein to inner margin; a black point on discocellular; a small subterminal dark brown dash between veins 5 and 6, inner margin grayish brown.

Hindwings yellowish white.

Wingspan 31 mm.

Habitat: Cayuga, Guatemala, also in collection from Mexico and Costa Rica.

Altogether paler than Lophocampa citrina Sepp and without the white spot on forewing.
