= Lophocampa oblita =

Scientific classification
- Domain: Eukaryota
- Kingdom: Animalia
- Phylum: Arthropoda
- Class: Insecta
- Order: Lepidoptera
- Superfamily: Noctuoidea
- Family: Erebidae
- Subfamily: Arctiinae
- Genus: Lophocampa
- Species: L. oblita

Binomial name
- Lophocampa oblita Vincent, 2009

Synonyms
- Halisidota fasciata Gaede, 1923

Species of moth

Lophocampa oblita is a moth of the family Erebidae described by Benoit Vincent in 2009. It was described by Max Gaede in 1923 under the name Halisidota fasciata. It is found in Bolivia.

== Taxonomy ==
Since L. fasciata is preoccupied by Euhalisidota fasciata, described by Augustus Radcliffe Grote in 1867, Lophocampa oblita was proposed by Vincent in 2009 as the replacement name.
