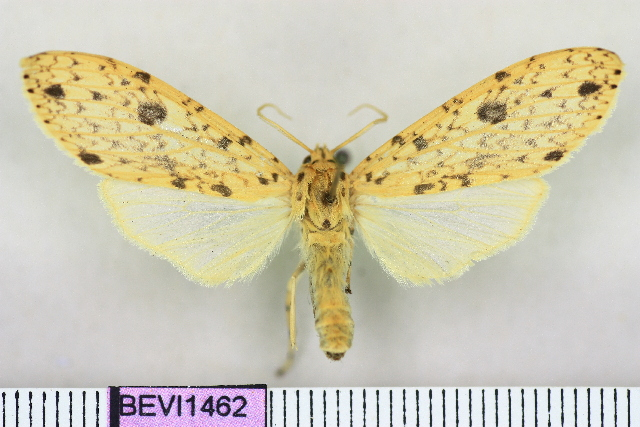

Scientific classification
- Kingdom: Animalia
- Phylum: Arthropoda
- Class: Insecta
- Order: Lepidoptera
- Superfamily: Noctuoidea
- Family: Erebidae
- Subfamily: Arctiinae
- Genus: Lophocampa
- Species: L. atrimaculata

Binomial name
- Lophocampa atrimaculata (Hampson, 1901)

Synonyms
- Halisidota atrimaculata Hampson, 1901

= Lophocampa atrimaculata =

Species of moth

Lophocampa atrimaculata is a moth of the family Erebidae. It was described by George Hampson in 1901. It is found in Costa Rica, Brazil, Bolivia and Peru.

== Description ==
In 1901 Hampson wrote in his description of Halisidota atrimaculata:

Ochreous; palpi with black spot at sides of 2nd joint; vertex of head, tegulae, patagia, tibiae, and tarsi with black spots. Fore wing irrorated with groups of black scales, some of them forming traces of oblique postmedial and subterminal dentate lines; some small black spots below base of cell; an antemedial spot on costa with a spot just beyond it in the cell and one on inner margin; a medial spot on inner margin and a larger discoidal spot; a small spot beyond the cell above vein 5, and a larger subterminal spot; a terminal series of small spots with larger spot below vein 2. Hind wing yellowish white. Hab. Brazil, Rio Janeiro, 1 m, 1 f type, Rio Grande; Bolivia, Suape; Peru, Hillap. Exp., M 42, F 50 millim.
