= Lophocampa pura =

Scientific classification
- Domain: Eukaryota
- Kingdom: Animalia
- Phylum: Arthropoda
- Class: Insecta
- Order: Lepidoptera
- Superfamily: Noctuoidea
- Family: Erebidae
- Subfamily: Arctiinae
- Genus: Lophocampa
- Species: L. pura

Binomial name
- Lophocampa pura (Neumoegen, 1882)

Synonyms
- Euhalisidota pura Neumoegen, 1882; Halisidota flavescens Rothschild, 1909

Species of moth

Lophocampa pura is a moth of the family Erebidae. It was described by Berthold Neumoegen in 1882. It is found in northern Mexico, Arizona, New Mexico and Texas.
