= Lophocampa arpi =

Scientific classification
- Domain: Eukaryota
- Kingdom: Animalia
- Phylum: Arthropoda
- Class: Insecta
- Order: Lepidoptera
- Superfamily: Noctuoidea
- Family: Erebidae
- Subfamily: Arctiinae
- Genus: Lophocampa
- Species: L. arpi

Binomial name
- Lophocampa arpi (Dognin, 1923)

Synonyms
- Elysius arpi Dognin, 1923; Halisidota problematica Reich, 1934; Lophocampa problematica Watson & Goodger, 1986

Species of moth

Lophocampa arpi is a moth of the family Erebidae. It was described by Paul Dognin in 1923. It is found in Brazil.
