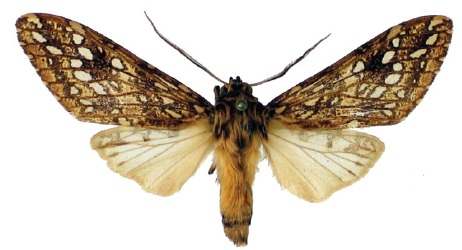
- Male

Scientific classification
- Domain: Eukaryota
- Kingdom: Animalia
- Phylum: Arthropoda
- Class: Insecta
- Order: Lepidoptera
- Superfamily: Noctuoidea
- Family: Erebidae
- Subfamily: Arctiinae
- Genus: Lophocampa
- Species: L. flavodorsata

Binomial name
- Lophocampa flavodorsata Vincent & Laguerre, 2013

= Lophocampa flavodorsata =

Species of moth

Lophocampa flavodorsata is a moth in the family Erebidae. It was described by Vincent & Laguerre in 2013. It is found in Venezuela (Aragua, Lara, Mérida), Ecuador (Napo, Morona-Santiago, Sucumbios) and Peru (Cuzco, Huanuco).

== Description ==
The forewings are brown irrorated with light and dark brown. There is one yellow spot with two small black dots at the base and a series of bands formed by white spots arranged as follows: the antemedial band is broken, the medial band is slightly curved and the postmedial band is sinuous. The hindwings are yellow-white, slightly tinged with yellow-brown marks on the apex and along the costa, with a yellowtinge along the anal border. Ventrally, the marks are more contrasting, deep brown centered with yellow-brown.

== Etymology ==
The specific epithet flavodorsata refers to the yellowish hairs of the abdominal tergites.
