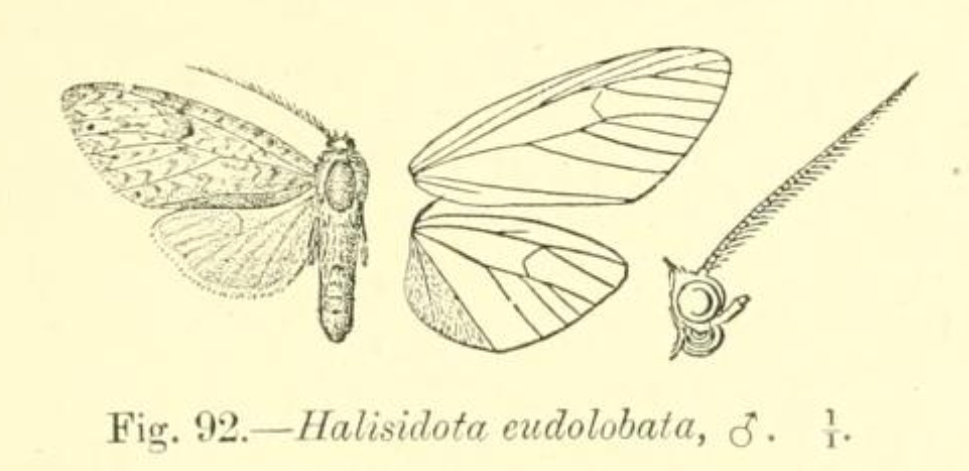

Scientific classification
- Kingdom: Animalia
- Phylum: Arthropoda
- Class: Insecta
- Order: Lepidoptera
- Superfamily: Noctuoidea
- Family: Erebidae
- Subfamily: Arctiinae
- Genus: Lophocampa
- Species: L. endolobata

Binomial name
- Lophocampa endolobata (Hampson, 1901)

Synonyms
- Halisidota endolobata Hampson, 1901

= Lophocampa endolobata =

Species of moth

Lophocampa endolobata is a moth of the family Erebidae. It was described by George Hampson in 1901. It is found in Brazil.

== Description ==
Ochreous; head and thorax tinged with brown; abdomen yellow. Forewing with about ten waved brown lines forming lunulate spots on postmedial area and somewhat diamond-shaped subterminal spots; a large clouded discoidal spot. Hindwing pale semihyaline yellow.

Wingspan 40 mm.
