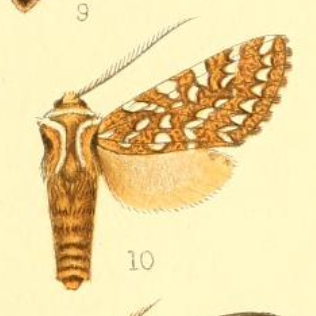

Scientific classification
- Kingdom: Animalia
- Phylum: Arthropoda
- Clade: Pancrustacea
- Class: Insecta
- Order: Lepidoptera
- Superfamily: Noctuoidea
- Family: Erebidae
- Subfamily: Arctiinae
- Genus: Lophocampa
- Species: L. andensis

Binomial name
- Lophocampa andensis (Schaus, 1896)

Synonyms
- Halisidota andensis Schaus, 1896

= Lophocampa andensis =

Species of moth

Lophocampa andensis is a moth in the family Erebidae. It was described by Schaus in 1896. It is found in Colombia.

== Description ==
Male

Head and thorax red brown mixed with ochreous brown; palpi white below, and orange at sides at extremity of 2nd joint, white marks above frons and behind antennae; tegulae edged with white, patagia with white patches; legs brown and white, fore femora orange at sides; abdomen brown, with slight orange dorsal bands on terminal segments, the ventral surface white with some brown marks. Forewing dark brown, thickly irrorated with ochreous; some white marks at base; an antemedial maculate band acutely angled in cell; a medial series of spots slightly angled on median nervure, then oblique; a spot in end of cell and two points on discocellulars, with a spot on costa above them; postmedial and subterminal series of spots, the former with the spots above veins 4 and 3 smaller and displaced outwards; a terminal series of points. Hindwing white, with some ochreous and brown spots on terminal two-thirds of costal area on underside.

Female

Abdomen brown and white; forewing with hardly any ochreous irroration.

Wingspan 46 mm for the male and 52 mm for the female.
