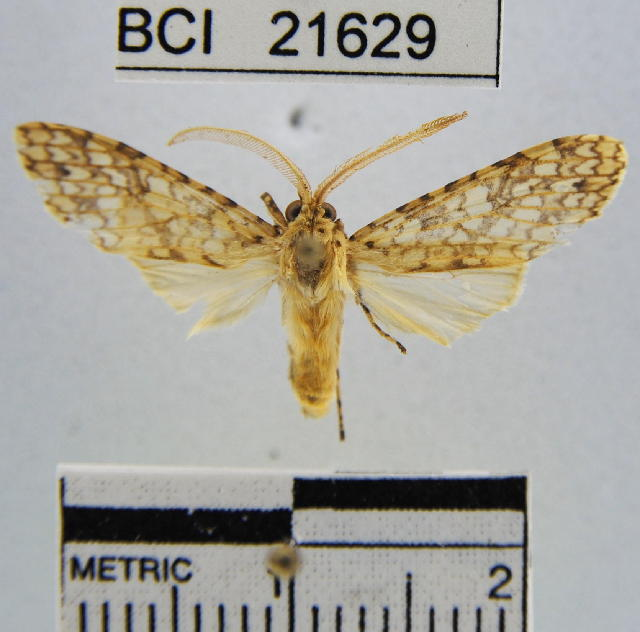

Scientific classification
- Kingdom: Animalia
- Phylum: Arthropoda
- Class: Insecta
- Order: Lepidoptera
- Superfamily: Noctuoidea
- Family: Erebidae
- Subfamily: Arctiinae
- Genus: Lophocampa
- Species: L. maroniensis

Binomial name
- Lophocampa maroniensis (Schaus, 1905)

Synonyms
- Halysidota maroniensis Schaus, 1905; Halisidota buchwaldi Rothschild, 1910

= Lophocampa maroniensis =

Species of moth

Lophocampa maroniensis is a moth of the family Erebidae. It was described by William Schaus in 1905. It is found in Costa Rica, Panama, French Guiana and Venezuela.

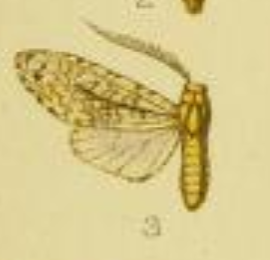
Halisidota maroniensis

== Subspecies ==
- Lophocampa maroniensis maroniensis (French Guiana, Venezuela)
- Lophocampa maroniensis buchwaldi (Rothschild, 1910)
