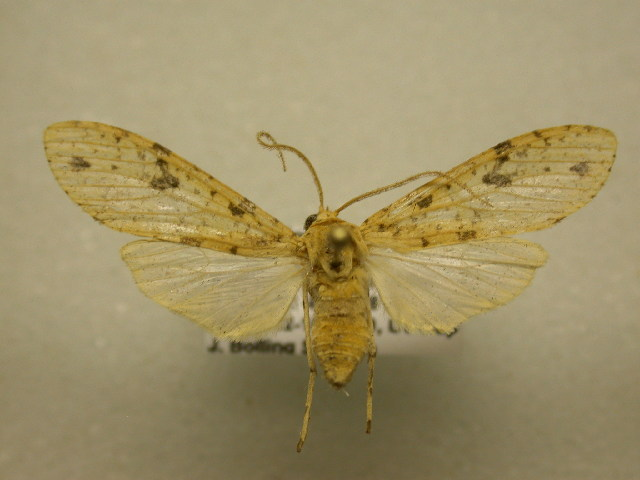

Scientific classification
- Domain: Eukaryota
- Kingdom: Animalia
- Phylum: Arthropoda
- Class: Insecta
- Order: Lepidoptera
- Superfamily: Noctuoidea
- Family: Erebidae
- Subfamily: Arctiinae
- Genus: Lophocampa
- Species: L. modesta

Binomial name
- Lophocampa modesta Kirby, 1892

Synonyms
- Halysidota sobrina Möschler, 1878 (preocc. Stretch, 1878); Halysidota sobrinella Strand, 1919

= Lophocampa modesta =

Species of moth

Lophocampa modesta is a moth of the family Erebidae. It was described by William Forsell Kirby in 1892. It is found in Costa Rica, Panama, Suriname, Ecuador, Bolivia, Peru and Venezuela.

== Description ==
In 1901 George Hampson described the species as follows:

Ochreous; palpi with black spot at side of 2nd joint; tegulae, patagia, tibiae, and tarsi spotted with black. Fore wing with fine double minutely dentate subbasal, antemedial, medial, and postmedial dark lines, the last bent outwards to inner margin; dark patches on costal area on antemedial line and at end of cell, and often on middle of inner margin; an irregularly dentate subterminal line angled inwards above vein 5, where there is often a black spot on it; a crenulate terminal line. Hind wing pale ochreous.

The wingspan for the males is 36–40 mm and the female was measured at 46 mm.
