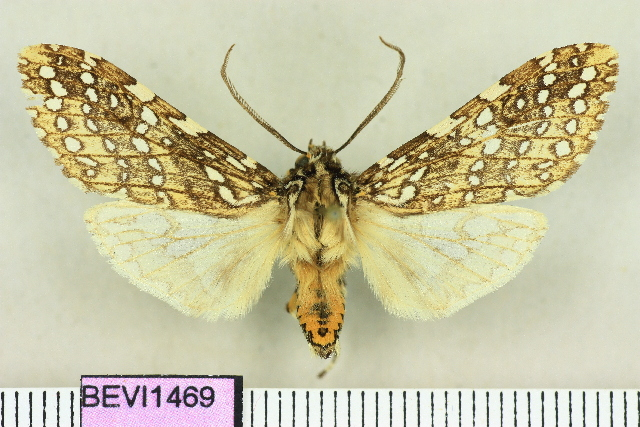

Scientific classification
- Domain: Eukaryota
- Kingdom: Animalia
- Phylum: Arthropoda
- Class: Insecta
- Order: Lepidoptera
- Superfamily: Noctuoidea
- Family: Erebidae
- Subfamily: Arctiinae
- Genus: Lophocampa
- Species: L. ronda

Binomial name
- Lophocampa ronda (E. D. Jones, 1908)

Synonyms
- Halysidota ronda E. D. Jones, 1908; Halysidota variegata Reich, 1934

= Lophocampa ronda =

Species of moth

Lophocampa ronda is a moth of the family Erebidae. It was described by E. Dukinfield Jones in 1908. It is found in Brazil.
