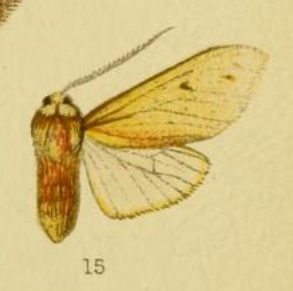

Scientific classification
- Domain: Eukaryota
- Kingdom: Animalia
- Phylum: Arthropoda
- Class: Insecta
- Order: Lepidoptera
- Superfamily: Noctuoidea
- Family: Erebidae
- Subfamily: Arctiinae
- Genus: Lophocampa
- Species: L. montana

Binomial name
- Lophocampa montana (Schaus, 1911)

Synonyms
- Halysidota montana Schaus, 1911

= Lophocampa montana =

Species of moth

Lophocampa montana is a moth of the family Erebidae. It was described by William Schaus in 1911. It is known from Poás Volcano in Costa Rica.

== Description ==
Male

Head, thorax, and abdomen yellow tinged with rufous; forelegs suffused with red-brown; ventral surface of abdomen ochreous white. Fore wing with the apex somewhat produced and falcate; yellow slightly tinged with rufous, the costa and inner margin except towards base suffused with rufous; traces of a maculate antemedial band defined by some brown scales and of a similar oblique band from lower angle of cell to inner margin; a blackish discoidal point; traces of oblique maculate postmedial and sub-terminal bands faintly defined by brown scales, the former with some slight brown points on its outer edge. Hind wing semihyaline ochreous white.

Hab. Costa Rica, Mt. Poas (Schaus), 1 M. Exp. 42 millim.

== Taxonomy ==
Lophocampa propinqua Edwards, 1884 has "Lophocampa montana Gaede, 1928" as a synonym.
