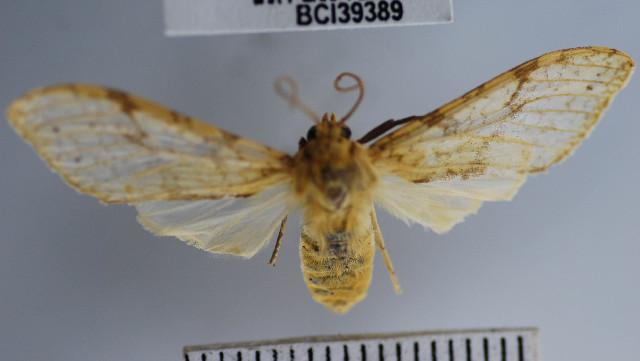

Scientific classification
- Domain: Eukaryota
- Kingdom: Animalia
- Phylum: Arthropoda
- Class: Insecta
- Order: Lepidoptera
- Superfamily: Noctuoidea
- Family: Erebidae
- Subfamily: Arctiinae
- Genus: Lophocampa
- Species: L. amaxiaeformis

Binomial name
- Lophocampa amaxiaeformis (Rothschild, 1910)

Synonyms
- Halisidota amaxiaeformis Rothschild, 1910; Thalesa amaxiaeformis

= Lophocampa amaxiaeformis =

Species of moth

Lophocampa amaxiaeformis is a moth of the family Erebidae. It was described by Walter Rothschild in 1910. It is found in Panama and Ecuador.

== Description ==
=== Male ===
Head and thorax yellow and reddish brown, abdomen pale yellow. Forewing pale yellow with brownish-red tinge and spots. Hindwing pale yellow. Wingspan 34 mm.
