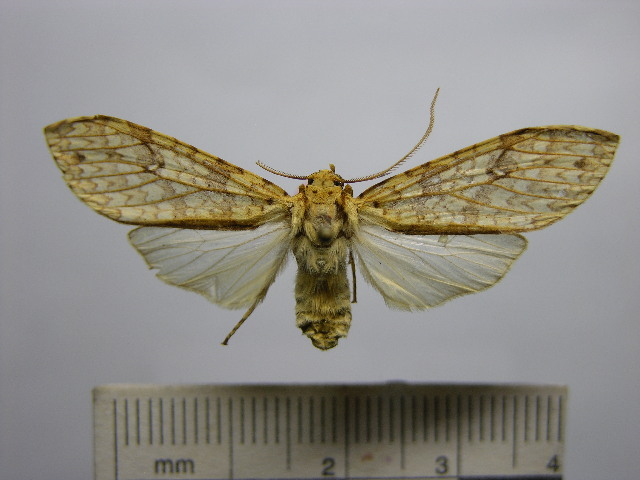

Scientific classification
- Domain: Eukaryota
- Kingdom: Animalia
- Phylum: Arthropoda
- Class: Insecta
- Order: Lepidoptera
- Superfamily: Noctuoidea
- Family: Erebidae
- Subfamily: Arctiinae
- Genus: Lophocampa
- Species: L. subannula

Binomial name
- Lophocampa subannula (Schaus, 1911)

Synonyms
- Halysidota subannula Schaus, 1911

= Lophocampa subannula =

Species of moth

Lophocampa subannula is a moth of the family Erebidae. It was described by William Schaus in 1911. Its known range extends through Costa Rica, Ecuador and Venezuela.
