= Lophocampa testacea =

Scientific classification
- Domain: Eukaryota
- Kingdom: Animalia
- Phylum: Arthropoda
- Class: Insecta
- Order: Lepidoptera
- Superfamily: Noctuoidea
- Family: Erebidae
- Subfamily: Arctiinae
- Genus: Lophocampa
- Species: L. testacea

Binomial name
- Lophocampa testacea (Möschler, 1878)

Synonyms
- Halisidota testacea Möschler, 1878; Halisidota uniformis Rothschild, 1910; Leucanopsis lecourti Toulgoët, 1987

Species of moth

Lophocampa testacea is a moth of the family Erebidae. It was described by Heinrich Benno Möschler in 1878. It is found in French Guiana, Suriname, Brazil and Trinidad.
