= Lophocampa citrinula =

Scientific classification
- Kingdom: Animalia
- Phylum: Arthropoda
- Class: Insecta
- Order: Lepidoptera
- Superfamily: Noctuoidea
- Family: Erebidae
- Subfamily: Arctiinae
- Genus: Lophocampa
- Species: L. citrinula

Binomial name
- Lophocampa citrinula (Bryk, 1953)

Synonyms
- Thalesa citrinula Bryk, 1953

Species of moth

Lophocampa citrinula is a moth of the family Erebidae. It was described by Felix Bryk in 1953. It is found in Peru.
