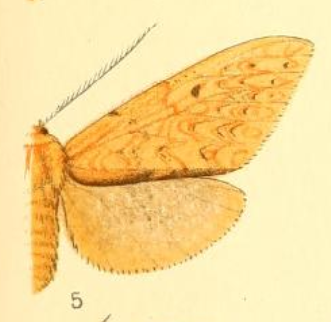

Scientific classification
- Domain: Eukaryota
- Kingdom: Animalia
- Phylum: Arthropoda
- Class: Insecta
- Order: Lepidoptera
- Superfamily: Noctuoidea
- Family: Erebidae
- Subfamily: Arctiinae
- Genus: Lophocampa
- Species: L. margona

Binomial name
- Lophocampa margona (Schaus, 1896)

Synonyms
- Halisidota margona Schaus, 1896

= Lophocampa margona =

Species of moth

Lophocampa margona is a moth of the family Erebidae. It was described by William Schaus in 1896. It is found in Mexico.

== Description ==
Body chrome yellow, the patagia, inwardly shaded with brown. Primaries acute with outer margin straight and oblique; yellow, the inner margin dark brown; fine wavy brown lines cross the wings, very indistinct at the base; the outer and submarginal lines double, filled in with a slightly darker shade than the ground color and the submarginal line ceases at vein 5; a terminal row of darker spots edged with brownish between the veins; a dark spot at the end of the cell. Secondaries whitish yellow. Expanse, 52 mm.
