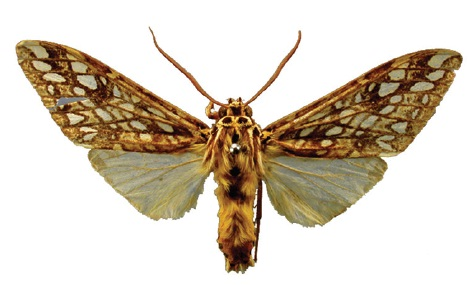
- Male

Scientific classification
- Kingdom: Animalia
- Phylum: Arthropoda
- Clade: Pancrustacea
- Class: Insecta
- Order: Lepidoptera
- Superfamily: Noctuoidea
- Family: Erebidae
- Subfamily: Arctiinae
- Genus: Lophocampa
- Species: L. atriceps

Binomial name
- Lophocampa atriceps (Hampson, 1901)

Synonyms
- Elysius atriceps Hampson, 1901

= Lophocampa atriceps =

Species of moth

Lophocampa atriceps is a moth in the family Erebidae. It was described by George Hampson in 1901. It is found in Colombia (Valle del Cauca), Ecuador (Guayas) and Costa Rica (Alajuela, Guanacaste, Puntarenas, Cartago).

== Description ==
The forewings are brown, irrorated with light and dark brown. There is one yellow spot and two small blacks dots at the base and a series of bands formed by whitish spots, arranged as follows: the antemedial band is composed of three spots, the medial band is curved and composed of seven dark spots, the postmedial band is sinuous and is formed by a series of different sized spots, the three adjacent to the costa being the largest. The hindwings are white and slightly tinged with yellow marks on the apex and along the costa, with a yellow tint along the anal border. Markings on the ventral surface are more contrasting.

The wingspan for the male is about 54 mm.
