= Lophocampa romoloa =

Scientific classification
- Domain: Eukaryota
- Kingdom: Animalia
- Phylum: Arthropoda
- Class: Insecta
- Order: Lepidoptera
- Superfamily: Noctuoidea
- Family: Erebidae
- Subfamily: Arctiinae
- Genus: Lophocampa
- Species: L. romoloa

Binomial name
- Lophocampa romoloa (Schaus, 1933)

Synonyms
- Halysidota romoloa Schaus, 1933; Halysidota philina Schaus, 1933; Halysidota ochreata Reich, 1935

Species of moth

Lophocampa romoloa is a moth of the family Erebidae. It was described by William Schaus in 1933. It is found in Brazil.
