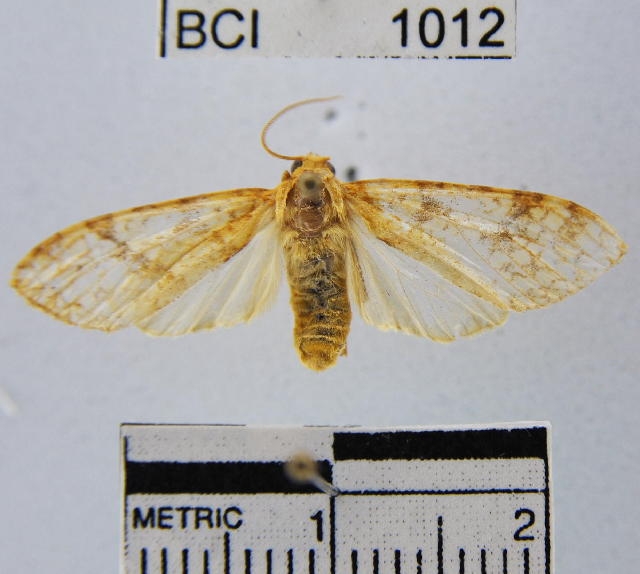

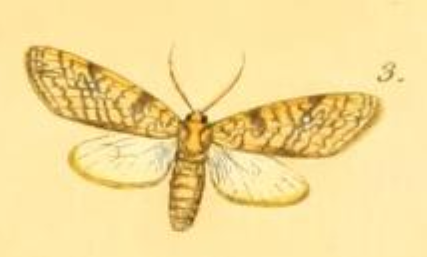

Scientific classification
- Kingdom: Animalia
- Phylum: Arthropoda
- Clade: Pancrustacea
- Class: Insecta
- Order: Lepidoptera
- Superfamily: Noctuoidea
- Family: Erebidae
- Subfamily: Arctiinae
- Genus: Lophocampa
- Species: L. catenulata

Binomial name
- Lophocampa catenulata (Hübner, [1812])

Synonyms
- Hipocrita catenulata Hübner, [1812]; Halisidota walkeri Rothschild, 1910

= Lophocampa catenulata =

Species of moth

Lophocampa catenulata is a moth of the family Erebidae. It was described by Jacob Hübner in 1812. It is found on Cuba and in Mexico, Costa Rica, Guatemala, Panama, Venezuela, Suriname, French Guiana, Brazil, Peru and Argentina.

The larvae feed on Inga vera.

== Description ==
It is generally yellow; head and thorax slightly marked with brown; abdomen pale below. Forewing with numerous fine, rather irregularly-waved brown lines, two of them forming a rather sinuous oblique band from the lower angle of the cell to the inner margin; there is a dark point at angle of discocellulars, and sometimes a whitish streak on the lower discocellular; a dark point on the subterminal line above vein 5; a dentate terminal line. Hindwing yellowish white; 4, 5 from cell or stalked, 8 a spur.

The wingspan for the male is 30–40 mm and for the female 36–46 mm.

Larva white; head yellowish; 1st somite with a dorsal green patch, the 2nd with a dorsal black patch; a blackish dorsal line; the anterior and posterior somites with tufts of long white hair projecting forward and backward; two tufts of yellow hair on terminal somite; the rest of hair white. Cocoon white. Pupa green. Food plant, Inga vera.
