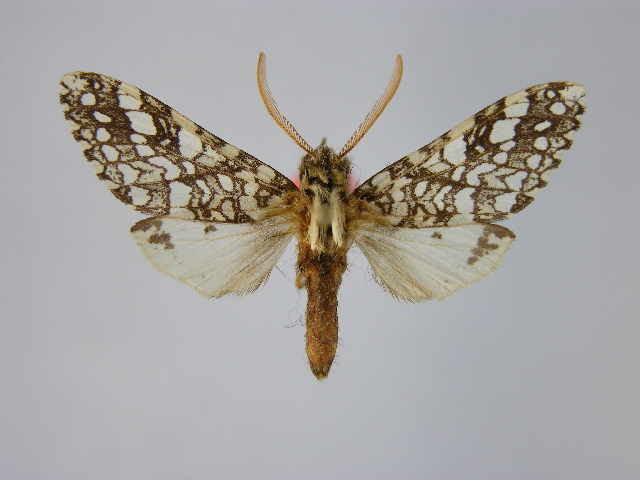

Scientific classification
- Domain: Eukaryota
- Kingdom: Animalia
- Phylum: Arthropoda
- Class: Insecta
- Order: Lepidoptera
- Superfamily: Noctuoidea
- Family: Erebidae
- Subfamily: Arctiinae
- Genus: Lophocampa
- Species: L. affinis

Binomial name
- Lophocampa affinis (Rothschild, 1909)

Synonyms
- Halisidota affinis Rothschild, 1909

= Lophocampa affinis =

Species of moth

Lophocampa affinis is a moth of the family Erebidae. It was described by Walter Rothschild in 1909. It is found in Mexico.

== Description ==
Lophocampa affinis, also known as the Affinis Tiger Moth, is a unique moth species within the Erebidae family. First described by Walter Rothschild in 1909, this species is native to Mexico.

Lophocampa affinis has a distinctive appearance that sets it apart from other species. Its head and thorax are a dark brown color, almost black. The ends of the scales covering the thorax (tegulae) are white, as are the protective shields near the head (patagia), except for their bases and a black spot in the middle. The moth’s antennae are a tawny orange color, and its legs are yellow on the upper side. The legs also have some white coloring, particularly on the long segments (tibiae) and the foot segments (tarsi).

The moth’s abdomen is yellow on top and covered with brown hair almost to the end, while the underside is a mix of brown and white. Its forewings are a dark brown with a dusting of white. Notably, there is a white patch at the base of the wing. The wing features several bands and spots of white, including:

A band near the front edge of the wing (antemedial) that is broken into spots and bends outward at the middle vein. Spots below the leading edge (costa) and in the central area (cell).

An angled band across the middle of the wing (medial) that starts at the leading edge and extends just above the first vein.

Two small spots near the center of the wing (discoidal). Another band behind the middle (postmedial) that is also broken into spots, with a crescent-shaped spot below the third vein.

A series of white spots near the edge of the wing (subterminal), with one spot below the seventh vein shifted toward the wingtip.

The wing edges (cilia) have a series of white spots. The hindwings are semi-transparent white with a brown tint near the base and inner areas. There is a black spot near the center (discoidal), a small spot near the tip (subapical), and faint points between the sixth and fourth veins. The underside of the hindwing has blackish spots placed diagonally below the leading edge and in the central area, with an additional spot on the leading edge above the central black spot.

The wingspan of Lophocampa affinis is 54 millimeters.
