= Lophocampa indistincta =

Scientific classification
- Kingdom: Animalia
- Phylum: Arthropoda
- Clade: Pancrustacea
- Class: Insecta
- Order: Lepidoptera
- Superfamily: Noctuoidea
- Family: Erebidae
- Subfamily: Arctiinae
- Genus: Lophocampa
- Species: L. indistincta

Binomial name
- Lophocampa indistincta (Barnes & McDunnough, 1910)

Synonyms
- Halysidota indistincta Barnes & McDunnough, 1910

Species of moth

Lophocampa indistincta is a moth of the family Erebidae. It was described by William Barnes and James Halliday McDunnough in 1910. It is found in California, where it is only found on the Channel Islands.

== Description ==
Male

General color dark ocherous; palpi, front and shaft of antennae light yellow; thorax with some indistinct darker shades. Markings on primaries very obscure; three spots along costa of a light yellowish color, the first two followed inwardly by a minute spot of similar color; an obscure spot just beyond cell, from which a faint broken brown line proceeds to middle of inner margin; beyond this another faint line commencing at vein M2 and ending above inner margin in a uniform spot, slightly lighter than ground color; a brown dentate submarginal line, most prominent at apex. Secondaries hyaline (glass like), tinged with yellow at anal angle.

Beneath hyaline; primaries broadly suffused with dark ochreous at apex and outer margin; costal margin of both wings yellowish, a brown mark just beyond cell, and an incomplete submarginal row of spots of same color.

Wingspan 43 mm.
