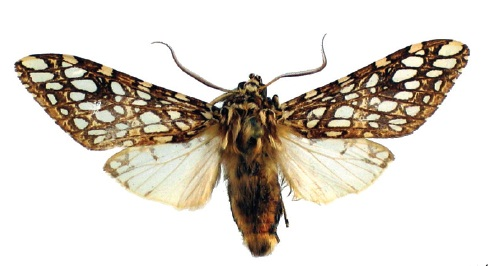
- Male

Scientific classification
- Kingdom: Animalia
- Phylum: Arthropoda
- Class: Insecta
- Order: Lepidoptera
- Superfamily: Noctuoidea
- Family: Erebidae
- Subfamily: Arctiinae
- Genus: Lophocampa
- Species: L. griseidorsata

Binomial name
- Lophocampa griseidorsata Vincent & Laguerre, 2013

= Lophocampa griseidorsata =

Species of moth

Lophocampa griseidorsata is a moth in the family Erebidae first described by Vincent and Laguerre in 2013. It is found in Bolivia (Cochabamba, La Paz), Ecuador (Napo, Morona-Santiago, Sucumbios, Azuay) and Peru (San Martin, Cuzco, Pasco).

== Description ==
The forewings are brown, irrorated (sprinkled) with pale and deep brown. There is one whitish spot with a yellow and two small blacks dots at the base, as well as a series of bands formed by whitish spots and organized as follows: a broken antemedial band, a slightly curved medial band with the size of the spots decreasing from the anal border to the costa and a sinuous postmedial band. The hindwings are whitish and slightly tinged with grey on the apex and along the costa. Ventrally, the marks are more contrasted, deep brown centered with yellowish brown.

== Larvae ==
The larvae feed on several species of Urticaceae, as well as Poaceae, Fabaceae, Ericaceae, Melanostomaceae and Rubiaceae species.

== Etymology ==
The specific epithet griseidorsata refers to the gray color of the abdominal tergites.
