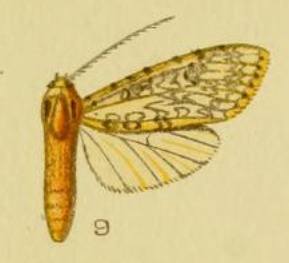

Scientific classification
- Domain: Eukaryota
- Kingdom: Animalia
- Phylum: Arthropoda
- Class: Insecta
- Order: Lepidoptera
- Superfamily: Noctuoidea
- Family: Erebidae
- Subfamily: Arctiinae
- Genus: Lophocampa
- Species: L. longipennis

Binomial name
- Lophocampa longipennis (Dognin, 1908)

Synonyms
- Halysidota longipennis Dognin, 1908

= Lophocampa longipennis =

Species of moth

Lophocampa longipennis is a moth of the family Erebidae. It was described by Paul Dognin in 1908. It is found in Bolivia.

== Description ==
Male

Head and thorax orange slightly tinged with brown; ... abdomen orange, the hair at base and ventral surface pale yellow. Fore wing long and narrow; pale yellow, the costa and inner margin more orange; ... Hind wing very pale yellow, semihyaline. ...

Exp,. 40 millim.
