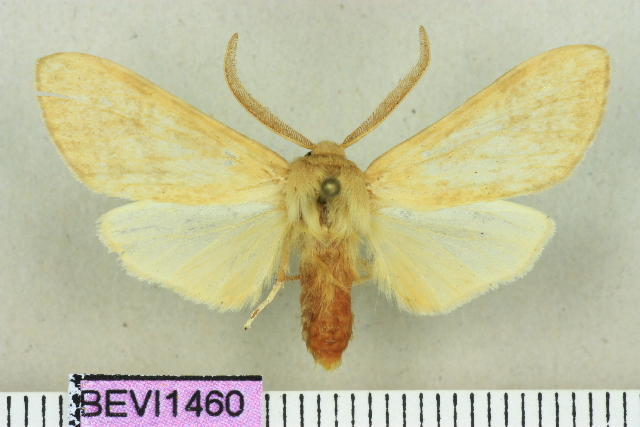

Scientific classification
- Kingdom: Animalia
- Phylum: Arthropoda
- Class: Insecta
- Order: Lepidoptera
- Superfamily: Noctuoidea
- Family: Erebidae
- Subfamily: Arctiinae
- Genus: Lophocampa
- Species: L. grotei

Binomial name
- Lophocampa grotei (Schaus, 1904)

Synonyms
- Halysidota grotei Schaus, 1904; Halisidota grotei Hampson, 1920

= Lophocampa grotei =

Species of moth

Lophocampa grotei is a moth of the family Erebidae. It was described by William Schaus in 1904. It is found on Cuba.

== Description ==
Male

Body fawn colored; two black points behind head; a black point on patagia; lateral black rings on abdomen; legs spotted at joints. Wings fawn color. Primaries with very irregular black irrorations (sprinkles) and lines, forming a darker inner and outer band, the former bifurcated on costa. Secondaries with an irregular subterminal black band.

Female

Similar, paler, the irrorations on primaries forming more even, fine, transverse lines about twelve in number, and not suffusing as in the male. Secondaries with a dark discal point, and the marginal dark band still more distinct. Below similar.

Wingspan for the male 32 mm and for the female 39 mm.

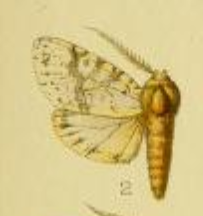
Halisidota grotei
