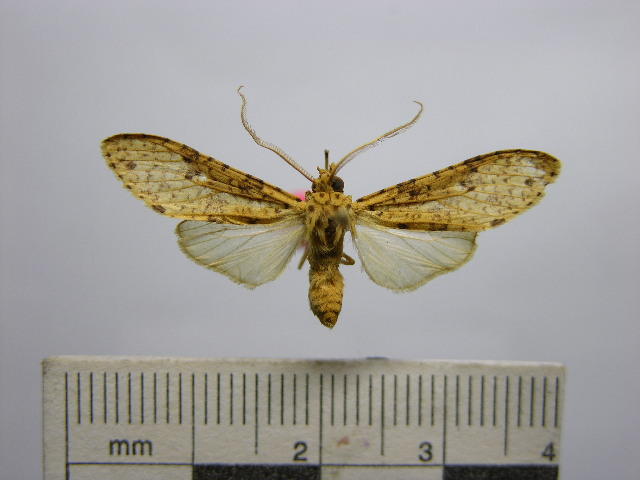

Scientific classification
- Domain: Eukaryota
- Kingdom: Animalia
- Phylum: Arthropoda
- Class: Insecta
- Order: Lepidoptera
- Superfamily: Noctuoidea
- Family: Erebidae
- Subfamily: Arctiinae
- Genus: Lophocampa
- Species: L. sobrinoides

Binomial name
- Lophocampa sobrinoides (Rothschild, 1910)

Synonyms
- Halisidota sobrinoides Rothschild, 1910

= Lophocampa sobrinoides =

Species of moth

Lophocampa sobrinoides is a moth of the family Erebidae. It was described by Rothschild in 1910. It is found in Peru, Colombia, Venezuela and Ecuador.
