= Lophocampa significans =

Scientific classification
- Domain: Eukaryota
- Kingdom: Animalia
- Phylum: Arthropoda
- Class: Insecta
- Order: Lepidoptera
- Superfamily: Noctuoidea
- Family: Erebidae
- Subfamily: Arctiinae
- Genus: Lophocampa
- Species: L. significans

Binomial name
- Lophocampa significans (H. Edwards, 1888)

Synonyms
- Halisidota significans H. Edwards, 1888

Species of moth

Lophocampa significans is a moth of the subfamily Arctiinae. It was described by Henry Edwards in 1888. It is found in the United States in New Mexico, Arizona, Colorado, Kansas, Utah and Wyoming.
