= Lophocampa petulans =

Scientific classification
- Domain: Eukaryota
- Kingdom: Animalia
- Phylum: Arthropoda
- Class: Insecta
- Order: Lepidoptera
- Superfamily: Noctuoidea
- Family: Erebidae
- Subfamily: Arctiinae
- Genus: Lophocampa
- Species: L. petulans

Binomial name
- Lophocampa petulans (Dognin, 1923)

Synonyms
- Halysidota petulans Dognin, 1923

Species of moth

Lophocampa petulans is a moth of the family Erebidae. It was described by Paul Dognin in 1923. It is found in Ecuador.
