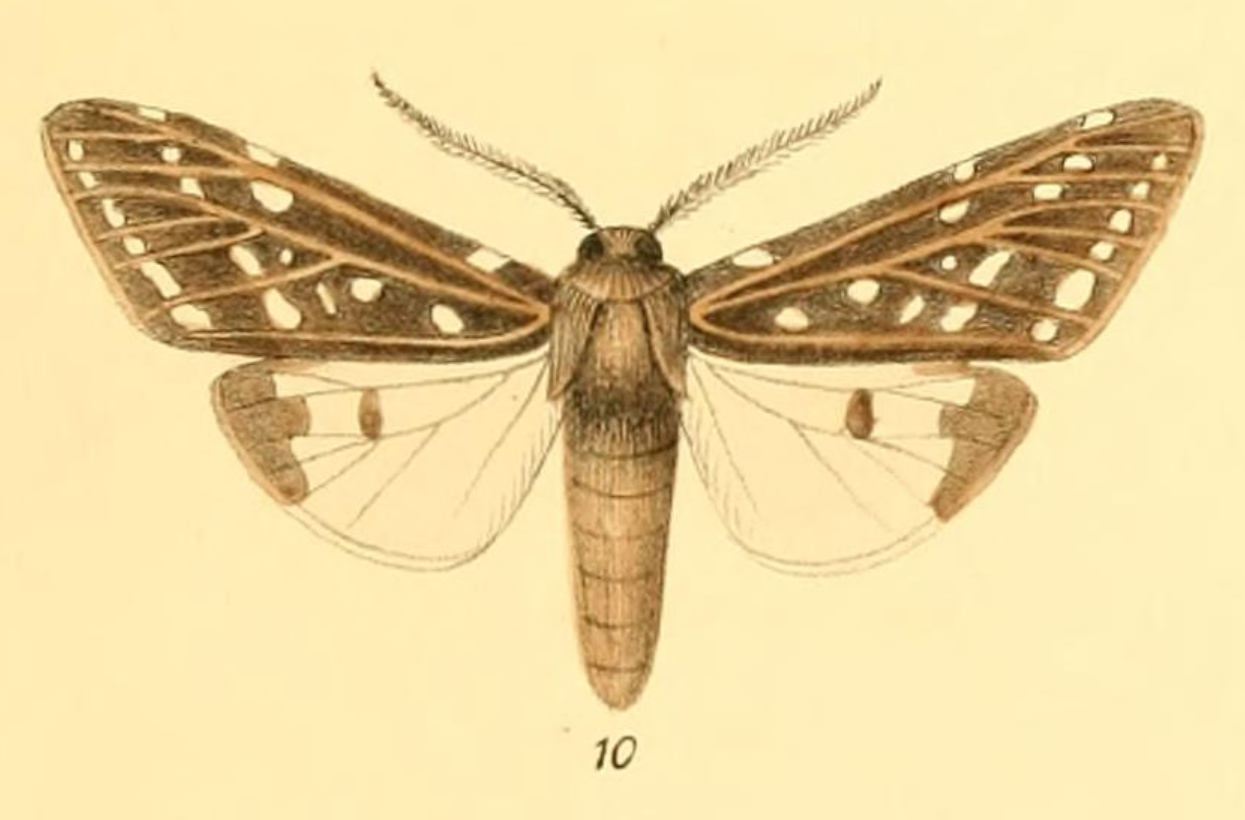
- Stretch's illustration of a male

Scientific classification
- Kingdom: Animalia
- Phylum: Arthropoda
- Class: Insecta
- Order: Lepidoptera
- Superfamily: Noctuoidea
- Family: Erebidae
- Subfamily: Arctiinae
- Genus: Lophocampa
- Species: L. sobrina

Binomial name
- Lophocampa sobrina (Stretch, 1872)

Synonyms
- Halysidota sobrina Stretch, 1872

= Lophocampa sobrina =

Species of moth

Lophocampa sobrina is a moth of the family Erebidae. It was described by Stretch in 1872. It is found in California, United States.
