= Lophocampa dinora =

Scientific classification
- Domain: Eukaryota
- Kingdom: Animalia
- Phylum: Arthropoda
- Class: Insecta
- Order: Lepidoptera
- Superfamily: Noctuoidea
- Family: Erebidae
- Subfamily: Arctiinae
- Genus: Lophocampa
- Species: L. dinora

Binomial name
- Lophocampa dinora (Schaus, 1924)

Synonyms
- Halysidota dinora Schaus, 1924

Species of moth

Lophocampa dinora is a moth of the family Erebidae. It was described by William Schaus in 1924. It is found in Argentina and Bolivia.

== Description ==
Male: Abdomen above orange buff; dorsal black spots, larger terminally, containing white scales; lateral triangular white spots edged with black; underneath white with transverse black lines. Legs with black orange and white markings. Forewing white faintly tinged with buff, the markings fuscous black except a small orange buff spot at base; veins fuscous black. Hindwing white. Wings below very similar to upperside.

Wingspan 44 mm.
