= Lophocampa neibaensis =

Scientific classification
- Domain: Eukaryota
- Kingdom: Animalia
- Phylum: Arthropoda
- Class: Insecta
- Order: Lepidoptera
- Superfamily: Noctuoidea
- Family: Erebidae
- Subfamily: Arctiinae
- Genus: Lophocampa
- Species: L. neibaensis

Binomial name
- Lophocampa neibaensis Vincent, 2005

Species of moth

Lophocampa neibaensis is a moth of the family Erebidae. It was described by Benoît Vincent in 2005. It is found in the Dominican Republic.
