= Lophocampa pectina =

Scientific classification
- Domain: Eukaryota
- Kingdom: Animalia
- Phylum: Arthropoda
- Class: Insecta
- Order: Lepidoptera
- Superfamily: Noctuoidea
- Family: Erebidae
- Subfamily: Arctiinae
- Genus: Lophocampa
- Species: L. pectina

Binomial name
- Lophocampa pectina (Schaus, 1896)

Synonyms
- Halysidota pectina Schaus, 1896

Species of moth

Lophocampa pectina is a moth of the family Erebidae. It was described by William Schaus in 1896. It is found in Mexico.

== Description ==
Antenna very deeply pectinated in the (male). Head and thorax dark buff; two black points on the collar and two on each patagia. Body chrome yellow. Primaries yellow with a broad basal and median transverse grayish shade; a double terminal and subterminal fine dark wavy line, the space within filled with a darker shade; the fringe yellowish with some black spots. Secondaries yellow. Expanse, M 41 mm.
