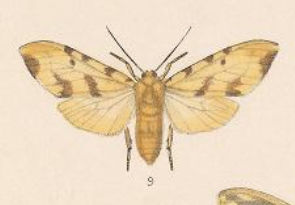

Scientific classification
- Domain: Eukaryota
- Kingdom: Animalia
- Phylum: Arthropoda
- Class: Insecta
- Order: Lepidoptera
- Superfamily: Noctuoidea
- Family: Erebidae
- Subfamily: Arctiinae
- Genus: Lophocampa
- Species: L. labaca

Binomial name
- Lophocampa labaca (H. Druce, 1890)

Synonyms
- Halisidota labaca H. Druce, 1890

= Lophocampa labaca =

Moth of the family Erebidae from Jalisco, Mexico

Lophocampa labaca is a moth of the family Erebidae. It was described by Herbert Druce in 1890. It is found in Jalisco, Mexico.

== Description ==
Primaries pale brownish yellow, with a small orange coloured spot close to the base, three large spots along the costal margin, a large elongated patch on the outer margin, and two rather broad streaks on the inner margin partly crossing the wing towards the middle, all pale brown. Secondaries pale yellowish white, partly hyaline (glass like) near the base. The underside of the primaries as above, but with all the markings more indistinct. The head and thorax the same colour as the primaries; the abdomen above orange, the anus and the underside whitish; the legs and antennas orange brown. Wingspan 2 1/4 inches (57 mm).
