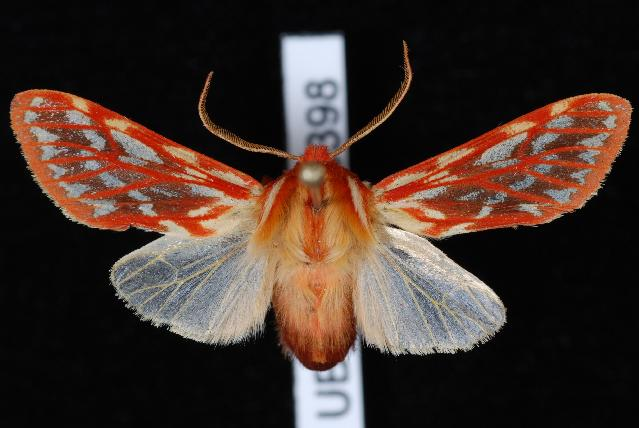

Conservation status
- Secure (NatureServe)

Scientific classification
- Kingdom: Animalia
- Phylum: Arthropoda
- Clade: Pancrustacea
- Class: Insecta
- Order: Lepidoptera
- Superfamily: Noctuoidea
- Family: Erebidae
- Subfamily: Arctiinae
- Genus: Lophocampa
- Species: L. roseata

Binomial name
- Lophocampa roseata (Walker, 1866)

Synonyms
- Halesidota roseata Walker, 1866; Aemilia roseata; Phaegoptera cinnamomea Boisduval, 1869; Halisidota sanguivenosa Neumoegen, 1892; Lophocampa occidentalis French, 1890

= Lophocampa roseata =

Species of moth

Lophocampa roseata, the rosy aemilia, is a moth of the subfamily Arctiinae. It was described by Francis Walker in 1866. It is found in North America in western Oregon, Washington and southwestern British Columbia. The habitat consists of conifer forests and urban landscapes.

The length of the forewings is 14–15 mm.

The larvae have been successfully reared on Douglas-fir,

== Subspecies ==
- Lophocampa roseata roseata
- Lophocampa roseata occidentalis French, 1890 (Rocky Mountains, Colorado)
