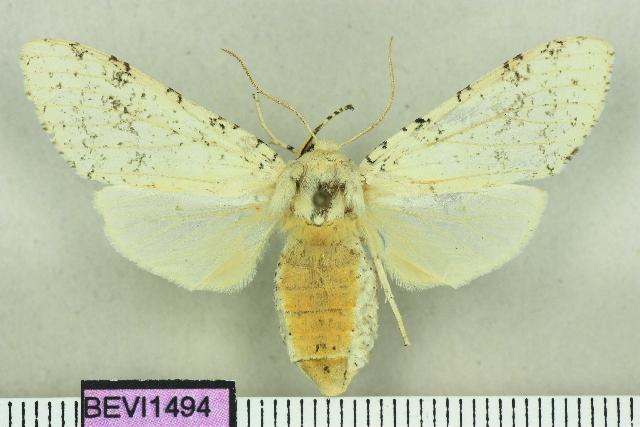

Scientific classification
- Kingdom: Animalia
- Phylum: Arthropoda
- Class: Insecta
- Order: Lepidoptera
- Superfamily: Noctuoidea
- Family: Erebidae
- Subfamily: Arctiinae
- Genus: Lophocampa
- Species: L. luxa

Binomial name
- Lophocampa luxa (Grote, [1866])

Synonyms
- Euhalisidota luxa Grote, [1866]

= Lophocampa luxa =

Species of moth

Lophocampa luxa is a moth of the subfamily Arctiinae. It was described by Augustus Radcliffe Grote in 1866. It is found on Cuba.

== Description ==
Female

Very pale yellowish testaceous. Primaries, marked with irregular and sparse black powdery dots; ... The apical third of the wings, irregularly and sparsely sprinkled with small black dots, ... The ground color of the wing shows no darker shades, being unicolorous whitish clay-color.

Secondaries, pale testaceous, semi-transparent. The scales are laid on evenly and thinly; the internal margin fringed with longer hairs. No markings or shades of any kind.

Under surface of primaries whitish testaceous, resembling upper surface in coloration, and without markings of any kind.

Head, and upper thoracic parts like primaries in coloration...

Abdomen, darker, slightly ochreous above; paler beneath. ... Exp. (Male), 2.50 inches. Length of body, 1.00 inch.
