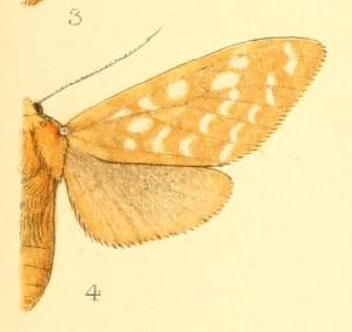
- Lophocampa bicolor

Scientific classification
- Kingdom: Animalia
- Phylum: Arthropoda
- Clade: Pancrustacea
- Class: Insecta
- Order: Lepidoptera
- Superfamily: Noctuoidea
- Family: Erebidae
- Subfamily: Arctiinae
- Genus: Lophocampa
- Species: L. bicolor

Binomial name
- Lophocampa bicolor (Walker, 1855)

Synonyms
- Halisidota bicolor Walker, 1855

= Lophocampa bicolor =

Species of moth

Lophocampa bicolor is a moth of the family Erebidae. It was described by Francis Walker in 1855. It is found in Mexico and Big Bend National Park, Texas.

== Description ==
Male. Reddish tawny. Head white. Proboscis tawny. Antennae whitish above. Thorax with three white stripes. Pectus white. Fore femora and fore tibiae thickly clothed with white hairs. Forewings testaceous, with indistinct hyaline spots. Hindwings white. Length of the body 7 lines; of the wings 17 lines.
