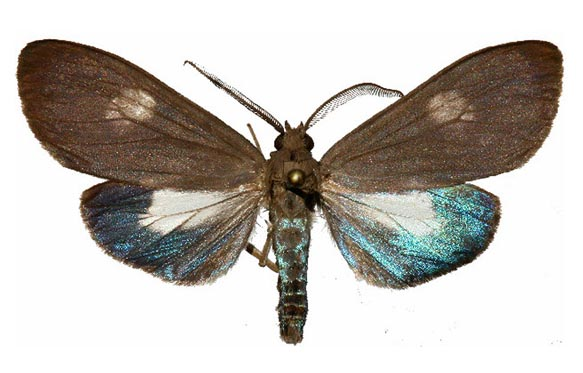
- A male Lophocampa teffeana

Scientific classification
- Domain: Eukaryota
- Kingdom: Animalia
- Phylum: Arthropoda
- Class: Insecta
- Order: Lepidoptera
- Superfamily: Noctuoidea
- Family: Erebidae
- Subfamily: Arctiinae
- Genus: Lophocampa
- Species: L. teffeana

Binomial name
- Lophocampa teffeana (Schaus, 1933)

Synonyms
- Halysidota teffeana Schaus, 1933

= Lophocampa teffeana =

Species of moth

Lophocampa teffeana is a moth of the family Erebidae. It was described by William Schaus in 1933. It is found in Brazil.
