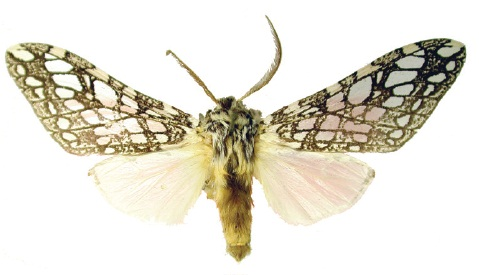
- Male

Scientific classification
- Domain: Eukaryota
- Kingdom: Animalia
- Phylum: Arthropoda
- Class: Insecta
- Order: Lepidoptera
- Superfamily: Noctuoidea
- Family: Erebidae
- Subfamily: Arctiinae
- Genus: Lophocampa
- Species: L. hyalinipuncta

Binomial name
- Lophocampa hyalinipuncta (Rothschild, 1909)

Synonyms
- Halisidota hyalinipuncta Rothschild, 1909

= Lophocampa hyalinipuncta =

Species of moth

Lophocampa hyalinipuncta is a moth in the family Erebidae. It was described by Walter Rothschild in 1909. It is found in Ecuador (Morona-Santiago, Carchi), Peru (Huanuco, Puno, Amazonas) and Bolivia (La Paz, Cochabamba, Chuquisaca).

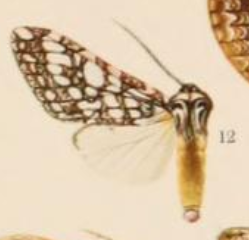
left

== Description ==
Male

Frons white mixed with black hairs and with a chevron-shaped black mark; vertex greyish black; thorax black, splashed and mixed with creamy white, inner side of patagia orange buff; abdomen orange buff above, densely clothed with sooty hairs, last segment sooty grey. Forewing sooty black, densely irrorated (sprinkled) with creamy white, a number of basal patches, costal patches, and a transverse row of submarginal patches creamy white; disc of wing occupied by four irregular transverse bands of large hyaline (glass-like) patches. Hindwing hyaline white, yellowish at base.

Length of forewing 23–27 mm.
