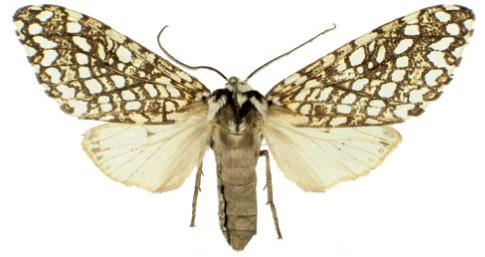

Scientific classification
- Kingdom: Animalia
- Phylum: Arthropoda
- Clade: Pancrustacea
- Class: Insecta
- Order: Lepidoptera
- Superfamily: Noctuoidea
- Family: Erebidae
- Subfamily: Arctiinae
- Genus: Lophocampa
- Species: L. albitegula

Binomial name
- Lophocampa albitegula Vincent, 2011

= Lophocampa albitegula =

Species of moth

Lophocampa albitegula is a moth of the family Erebidae. It was described by Benoit Vincent in 2011. It is probably restricted to high elevations of the Sierra de Bahoruco in the Dominican Republic, although it could be present in the Sierra de Neiba. The habitat is montane cloud forest.

== Description ==
The length of the forewings is about 25 mm. The ground colour is light beige, largely speckled with brown and ornamented with bands of white rounded spots underlined with brown. The basal band formed by a unique spot on the costa. The postbasal, antemedian, median, postmedian and subterminal bands are formed by an alignment of white spots underlined with brown and intercalating between veins. The postbasal band is broken. The antemedian is formed by two white spots and two brown spots. The median band is formed by two spots on the reniform spot. The postmedian is almost straight and complete. The terminal band is formed by irregular white spots sometimes fused with the sinuous subterminal spots. The hindwing is white and semi-translucent. The anal margin is more densely scaled with brown scales. The fringe is checkered white and brownish.

The early stages and food plants are unknown.

== Etymology ==
The name reflects the white tegulae of the species.
