= Lophocampa texta =

Scientific classification
- Domain: Eukaryota
- Kingdom: Animalia
- Phylum: Arthropoda
- Class: Insecta
- Order: Lepidoptera
- Superfamily: Noctuoidea
- Family: Erebidae
- Subfamily: Arctiinae
- Genus: Lophocampa
- Species: L. texta

Binomial name
- Lophocampa texta (Herrich-Schäffer, [1855])

Synonyms
- Charidea texta Herrich-Schäffer, [1855]

Species of moth

Lophocampa texta is a moth of the family Erebidae. It was described by Gottlieb August Wilhelm Herrich-Schäffer in 1855. It is found in Brazil.
