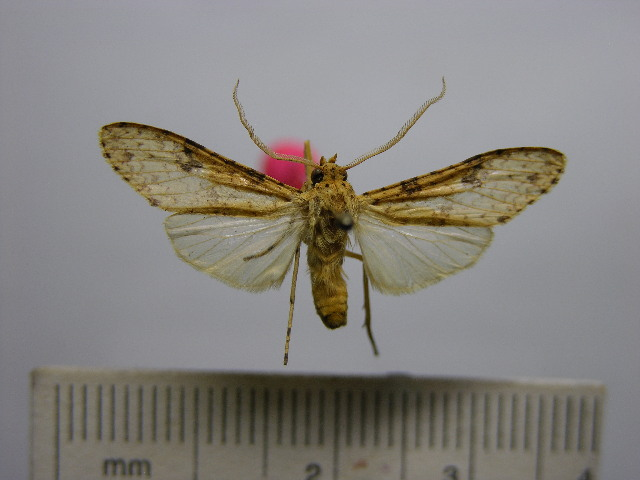

Scientific classification
- Domain: Eukaryota
- Kingdom: Animalia
- Phylum: Arthropoda
- Class: Insecta
- Order: Lepidoptera
- Superfamily: Noctuoidea
- Family: Erebidae
- Subfamily: Arctiinae
- Genus: Lophocampa
- Species: L. laroipa

Binomial name
- Lophocampa laroipa (H. Druce, 1893)

Synonyms
- Halisidota laroipa H. Druce, 1893; Halysidota laoripa Dognin, 1891

= Lophocampa laroipa =

Species of moth

Lophocampa laroipa is a moth of the family Erebidae. It was described by Herbert Druce in 1893. It is found in Costa Rica, Guatemala, Ecuador and Brazil.

== Description ==
Male

Primaries are pale fawn coloured, crossed from the costal to the inner margin with fine zigzag dark brown lines. There are two spots on the costal margin, one at the end of the cell, and two on the outer margin dark brown. The fringe is alternately fawn and dark brown. Secondaries pale yellowish white. Head, antennae, thorax, abdomen, and legs yellowish fawn. Expanse 1 1/2.
