= Lophocampa russus =

Scientific classification
- Domain: Eukaryota
- Kingdom: Animalia
- Phylum: Arthropoda
- Class: Insecta
- Order: Lepidoptera
- Superfamily: Noctuoidea
- Family: Erebidae
- Subfamily: Arctiinae
- Genus: Lophocampa
- Species: L. russus

Binomial name
- Lophocampa russus (Rothschild, 1909)

Synonyms
- Syntarctia russus Rothschild, 1909

Species of moth

Lophocampa russus is a moth of the family Erebidae. It was described by Rothschild in 1909. It is found in South America, including Peru.
