= Lophocampa puertoricensis =

Scientific classification
- Domain: Eukaryota
- Kingdom: Animalia
- Phylum: Arthropoda
- Class: Insecta
- Order: Lepidoptera
- Superfamily: Noctuoidea
- Family: Erebidae
- Subfamily: Arctiinae
- Genus: Lophocampa
- Species: L. puertoricensis

Binomial name
- Lophocampa puertoricensis Vincent, 2009

Species of moth

Lophocampa puertoricensis is a moth of the family Erebidae. It was described by Vincent in 2009. It is found in Puerto Rico.
