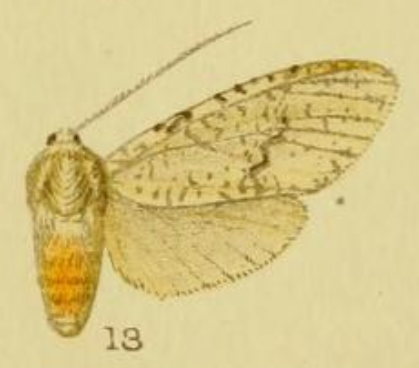

Scientific classification
- Kingdom: Animalia
- Phylum: Arthropoda
- Class: Insecta
- Order: Lepidoptera
- Superfamily: Noctuoidea
- Family: Erebidae
- Subfamily: Arctiinae
- Genus: Lophocampa
- Species: L. albipennis

Binomial name
- Lophocampa albipennis (Hampson, 1904)

Synonyms
- Halisidota albipennis Hampson, 1904

= Lophocampa albipennis =

Species of moth

Lophocampa albipennis is a moth of the family Erebidae. It was described by George Hampson in 1904. It is found on the Bahamas.

== Description ==
=== Female ===
Head and thorax white; tegulae and patagia with indistinct fuscous annuli; palpi with fuscous marks at sides; legs with slight fuscous bands, the fore femora yellow above; abdomen white, dorsally yellow except at extremity. Forewing white with numerous waved interrupted fuscous lines forming obscure annuli; an antemedial semicircular mark on costa; a discoidal lunule with illdefined oblique band formed by the waved lines from it to inner margin. Hindwing pure white.

Wingspan, 50–54 mm.
