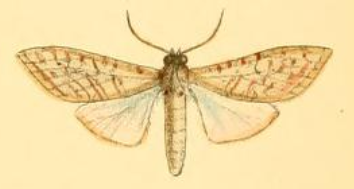

Scientific classification
- Domain: Eukaryota
- Kingdom: Animalia
- Phylum: Arthropoda
- Class: Insecta
- Order: Lepidoptera
- Superfamily: Noctuoidea
- Family: Erebidae
- Subfamily: Arctiinae
- Genus: Lophocampa
- Species: L. aenone

Binomial name
- Lophocampa aenone (Butler, 1878)

Synonyms
- Halesidota aenone Butler, 1878

= Lophocampa aenone =

Species of moth

Lophocampa aenone is a moth of the family Erebidae. It was described by Arthur Gardiner Butler in 1878. It is found in Brazil, Suriname, Venezuela and Ecuador.

== Description ==
Primaries above semitransparent whitey brown, crossed by wavy grey lines much as in the preceding species, but with no oblique central line; a more or less marked blackish spot at the inferior extremity of the cell; secondaries hyaline white; thorax brown, abdomen creamy white; primaries below less strongly marked than above; body sordid white: expanse, M 1 inch 2 lines; F 1 inch 4 lines.
