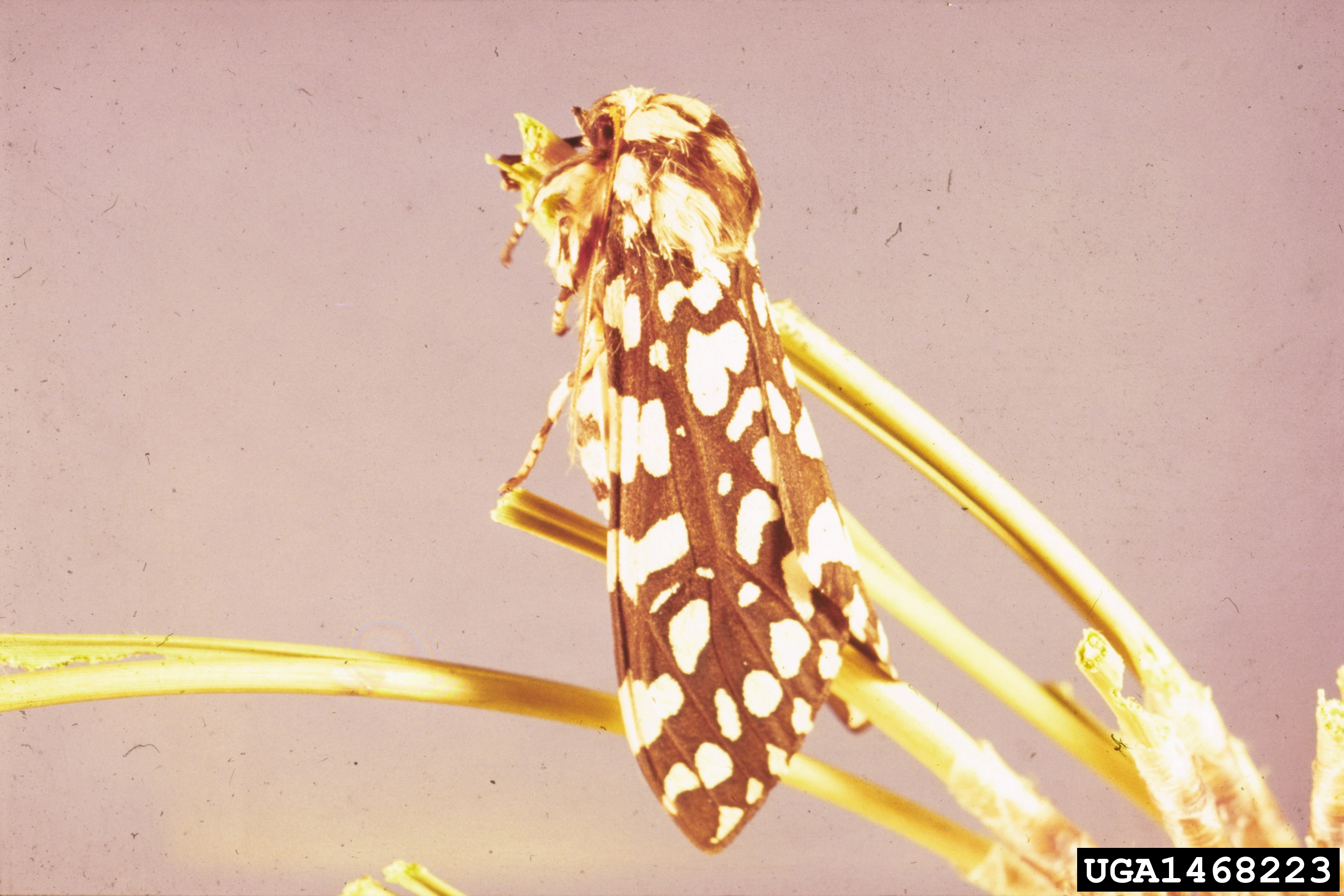

Scientific classification
- Domain: Eukaryota
- Kingdom: Animalia
- Phylum: Arthropoda
- Class: Insecta
- Order: Lepidoptera
- Superfamily: Noctuoidea
- Family: Erebidae
- Subfamily: Arctiinae
- Genus: Lophocampa
- Species: L. ingens

Binomial name
- Lophocampa ingens (H. Edwards, 1881)

Synonyms
- Halesidota ingens H. Edwards, 1881; Halesidota scapularis Stretch, 1885; Lophocampa cibriani Beutelspacher, [1986]; Lophocampa donahuei Beutelspacher, 1992; Halisidota ingens Hampson, 1901

= Lophocampa ingens =

Species of moth

Lophocampa ingens is a moth of the family Erebidae. It was described by Henry Edwards in 1881. It is found in the southern Rocky Mountains (Arizona, Colorado, New Mexico and Utah) and in Mexico.

The moth flies in May and June. The larvae feed on ponderosa, lodgepole and piñon pines.

== Description ==
Male

Eyes black. Head pale fawn color. Antenna stout, long, rufous. Prothorax dirty white, with brown median line. Patagia like prothorax, brown in front. Thorax brown, with triangular white spot in front. Abdomen dark yellow ochre above, banded below with brown and pale fawn color. Primaries dark brown with six irregular bands of white spots. The first basal and narrow, the spots fused into an irregular curved band. The second row consists of a large irregular spot below the median vein, and a long costal spot divided by the subcostal vein. The third row has a similar costal spot, a small one below the median vein, and a large one above and a small one below the submedian vein. The fourth row has five spots, the middle one very small. The fifth row is submarginal, and consists of eight lunate spots decreasing in size towards the costa where they also become more ovate. The sixth row is marginal, triangular, a small spot at the end of each of the nervules. Secondaries very pale fawn white, with four darker submarginal spots, those near the apex largest.

Female

Similar to male, but the head brown, the spots on the primaries larger and slightly more irregular, and but two spots on the secondaries, the largest near the apex. Beneath, the secondaries show a dusky shade at the middle of the costa, irregularly connected with the apical spot.

The wingspan of the male is 2.00 inches (51 mm) and of the female 2.30 inches (58 mm).
