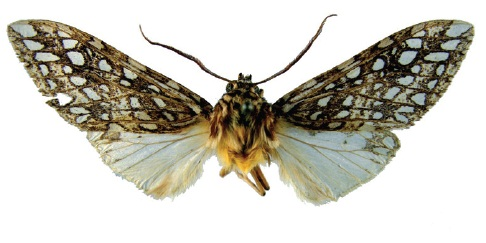
- Male

Scientific classification
- Domain: Eukaryota
- Kingdom: Animalia
- Phylum: Arthropoda
- Class: Insecta
- Order: Lepidoptera
- Superfamily: Noctuoidea
- Family: Erebidae
- Subfamily: Arctiinae
- Genus: Lophocampa
- Species: L. sullivani

Binomial name
- Lophocampa sullivani Vincent & Laguerre, 2013

= Lophocampa sullivani =

Species of moth

Lophocampa sullivani is a moth in the family Erebidae. It is found in Ecuador (Pichincha) and Colombia (Valle del Cauca).

The forewings are yellowish, irrorated with chestnut brown and a series of creamy-white spots with diffuse brown edges. One orange spot with two small black dots is found at the base. The hindwings are yellowish white slightly tinged with fuscous on the apex and along the costa.

== Etymology ==
The species is named in honor of J. Bolling Sullivan who collected this species in 1988.
