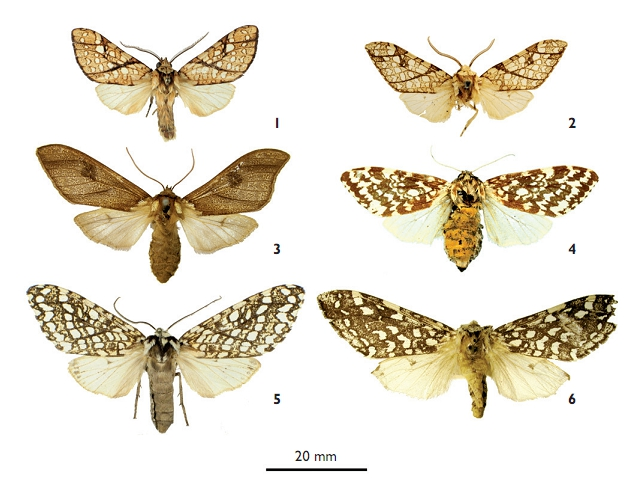
- 1 L. lineata male; 2 L. propinqua male; 3 L. brunnea female; 4 L. alternata female; 5 L. albitegula female; 6 L. albiguttata female

Scientific classification
- Domain: Eukaryota
- Kingdom: Animalia
- Phylum: Arthropoda
- Class: Insecta
- Order: Lepidoptera
- Superfamily: Noctuoidea
- Family: Erebidae
- Subfamily: Arctiinae
- Tribe: Arctiini
- Subtribe: Phaegopterina
- Genus: Lophocampa; Harris, 1841

Synonyms
- Euhalisidota Grote, [1866]; Phoegoptera Boisduval, 1869; Thalesa Schaus, 1896; Schausia Dyar, 1897; Euschausia Dyar, 1898; Syntarctia Hampson, 1901

= Lophocampa =

Genus of moths

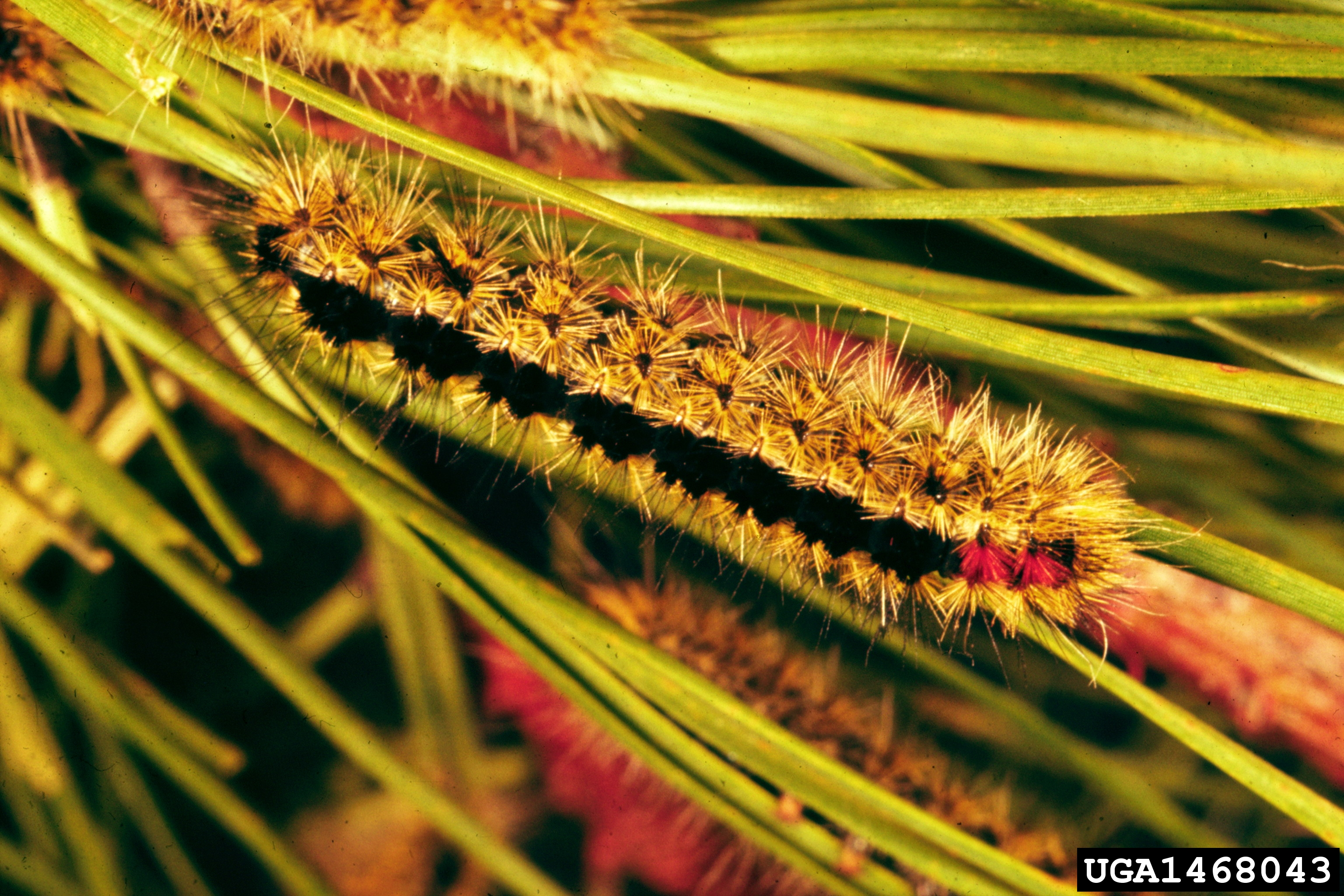
Lophocampa ingens larva

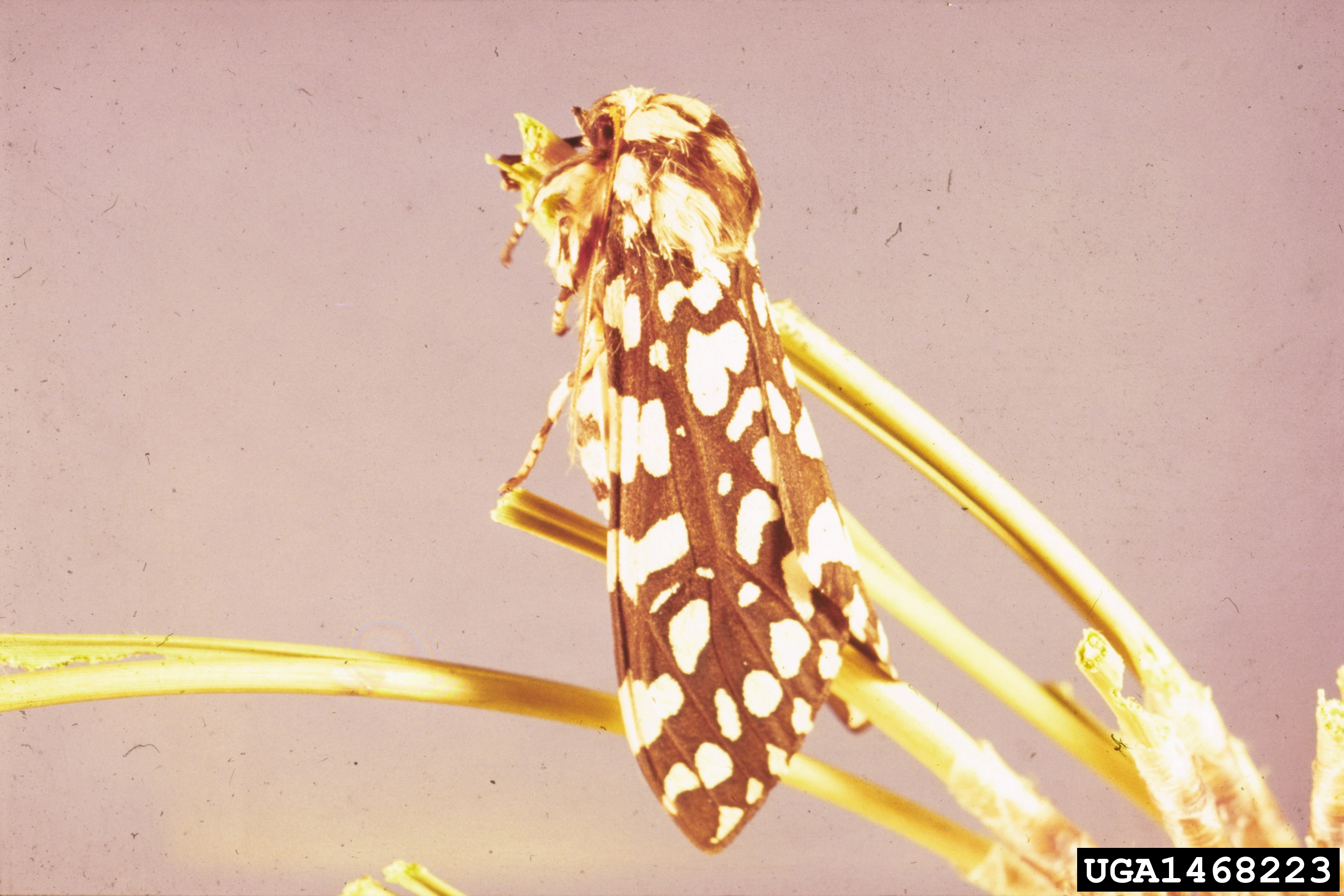
Adult Lophocampa ingens

Lophocampa is a genus of moths in the family Erebidae. The genus was erected by Thaddeus William Harris in 1841. It contains around 75 species.

== Species ==
The following are species classified under Lophocampa:

- Lophocampa aenone (Butler, 1878)
- Lophocampa affinis (Rothschild, 1909)
- Lophocampa albescens (Rothschild, 1909)
- Lophocampa albiguttata Boisduval, 1870
- Lophocampa albipennis (Hampson, 1904)
- Lophocampa albitegula Vincent, 2011
- Lophocampa alsus (Cramer, [1777])
- Lophocampa alternata (Grote, 1867)
- Lophocampa amaxiaeformis (Rothschild, 1910)
- Lophocampa andensis Schaus, 1896
- Lophocampa annulosa (Walker, 1855) – Santa Ana tussock moth
- Lophocampa argentata (Packard, 1864) – silver-spotted tiger moth
- Lophocampa arpi (Dognin, 1923)
- Lophocampa atomosa (Walker, 1855)
- Lophocampa atriceps (Hampson, 1901)
- Lophocampa atrimaculata (Hampson, 1901)
- Lophocampa baorucoensis Vincent, 2005
- Lophocampa bicolor Walker, 1855
- Lophocampa brunnea Vincent, 2011
- Lophocampa caryae Harris, 1841 – hickory tiger moth
- Lophocampa catenulata (Hübner, [1812])
- Lophocampa citrina (Sepp, [1843])
- Lophocampa citrinula (Bryk, 1953)
- Lophocampa debilis (Schaus, 1920)
- Lophocampa dinora (Schaus, 1924)
- Lophocampa distincta (Rothschild, 1909)
- Lophocampa dognini (Rothschild, 1910)
- Lophocampa donahuei Beutelspacher, 1992
- Lophocampa duarteiensis Vincent, 2005
- Lophocampa endolobata (Hampson, 1901)
- Lophocampa endrolepia (Dognin, 1908)
- Lophocampa flavodorsata Vincent & Laguerre, 2013
- Lophocampa griseidorsata Vincent & Laguerre, 2013
- Lophocampa grotei (Schaus, 1904)
- Lophocampa herbini Vincent & Laguerre, 2013
- Lophocampa hispaniola Vincent, 2009
- Lophocampa hyalinipuncta (Rothschild, 1909)
- Lophocampa indistincta (Barnes & McDunnough, 1910)
- Lophocampa ingens (H. Edwards, 1881)
- Lophocampa labaca (Druce, 1890)
- Lophocampa laroipa (Druce, 1893)
- Lophocampa latepunctata Vincent, 2005
- Lophocampa lesieuri Vincent, 2005
- Lophocampa lineata Vincent, 2011
- Lophocampa longipennis (Dognin, 1908)
- Lophocampa luxa (Grote, [1866])
- Lophocampa maculata Harris, 1841 – spotted tussock moth
- Lophocampa margona (Schaus, 1896)
- Lophocampa maroniensis (Schaus, 1905)
- Lophocampa mixta (Neumoegen, 1882)
- Lophocampa modesta Kirby, 1892
- Lophocampa montana (Schaus, 1911)
- Lophocampa neibaensis Vincent, 2005
- Lophocampa nimbifacta (Dyar, 1912)
- Lophocampa niveigutta (Walker, 1856)
- Lophocampa oblita Vincent, 2009
- Lophocampa pectina (Schaus, 1896)
- Lophocampa petulans (Dognin, 1923)
- Lophocampa problematica (Reich, 1934)
- Lophocampa propinqua (H. Edwards, 1884)
- Lophocampa pseudomaculata (Rothschild, 1910)
- Lophocampa puertoricensis Vincent, 2009
- Lophocampa pura (Neumoegen, 1882)
- Lophocampa romoloa (Schaus, 1933)
- Lophocampa ronda (E. D. Jones, 1908)
- Lophocampa roseata (Walker, 1868)
- Lophocampa russus (Rothschild, 1909)
- Lophocampa scripta (Grote, 1867)
- Lophocampa secunda Vincent, 2009
- Lophocampa seruba (Herrich-Schäffer, [1855])
- Lophocampa sesia (Sepp, [1852])
- Lophocampa significans (H. Edwards, 1888)
- Lophocampa sobrina (Stretch, 1872)
- Lophocampa sobrinoides (Rothschild, 1910)
- Lophocampa subannula (Schaus, 1911)
- Lophocampa subfasciata (Rothschild, 1910)
- Lophocampa subvitreata (Rothschild, 1922)
- Lophocampa sullivani Vincent & Laguerre, 2013
- Lophocampa teffeana (Schaus, 1933)
- Lophocampa testacea (Möschler, 1878)
- Lophocampa texta (Herrich-Schäffer, [1855])
- Lophocampa thyophora (Schaus, 1896)
- Lophocampa tucumana (Rothschild, 1909)
