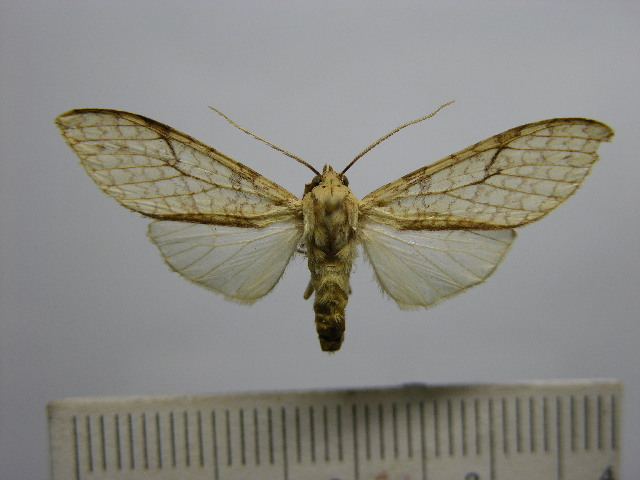

Scientific classification
- Domain: Eukaryota
- Kingdom: Animalia
- Phylum: Arthropoda
- Class: Insecta
- Order: Lepidoptera
- Superfamily: Noctuoidea
- Family: Erebidae
- Subfamily: Arctiinae
- Genus: Lophocampa
- Species: L. subvitreata

Binomial name
- Lophocampa subvitreata (Rothschild, 1922)

Synonyms
- Halysidota subvitreata Rothschild, 1922

= Lophocampa subvitreata =

Species of moth

Lophocampa subvitreata is a moth of the family Erebidae. It was described by Rothschild in 1922. It is found in French Guiana and Guatemala.
