= Lophocampa thyophora =

Scientific classification
- Domain: Eukaryota
- Kingdom: Animalia
- Phylum: Arthropoda
- Class: Insecta
- Order: Lepidoptera
- Superfamily: Noctuoidea
- Family: Erebidae
- Subfamily: Arctiinae
- Genus: Lophocampa
- Species: L. thyophora

Binomial name
- Lophocampa thyophora (Schaus, 1896)

Synonyms
- Halisidota thyophora Schaus, 1896

Species of moth

Lophocampa thyophora is a moth of the family Erebidae. It was described by William Schaus in 1896. It is found in Venezuela.
