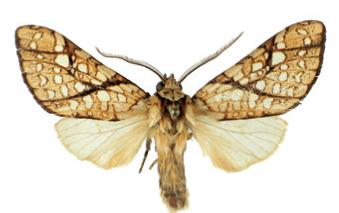

Scientific classification
- Kingdom: Animalia
- Phylum: Arthropoda
- Clade: Pancrustacea
- Class: Insecta
- Order: Lepidoptera
- Superfamily: Noctuoidea
- Family: Erebidae
- Subfamily: Arctiinae
- Genus: Lophocampa
- Species: L. lineata

Binomial name
- Lophocampa lineata Vincent, 2011

= Lophocampa lineata =

Species of moth

Lophocampa lineata is a moth of the family Erebidae. It was described by Vincent in 2011. It is probably restricted to middle elevations of the central cordillera in the Dominican Republic. The habitat is montane cloud forest.

== Description ==
The length of the forewings is about 18 mm. The ground colour is yellow with white spot bands. The basal band has one white spot highlighted with brown. The postbasal, antemedian, median, postmedian and subterminal bands are formed by rounded white spots intercalating between veins. The wing is crossed by two narrow brown transverse lines. The fringe is brown. The hindwing is white and semi-translucent. The anal margin is more densely scaled with yellow.

The early stages and food plants are unknown.

== Etymology ==
The name refers to the two brown transverse lines crossing the forewing.
