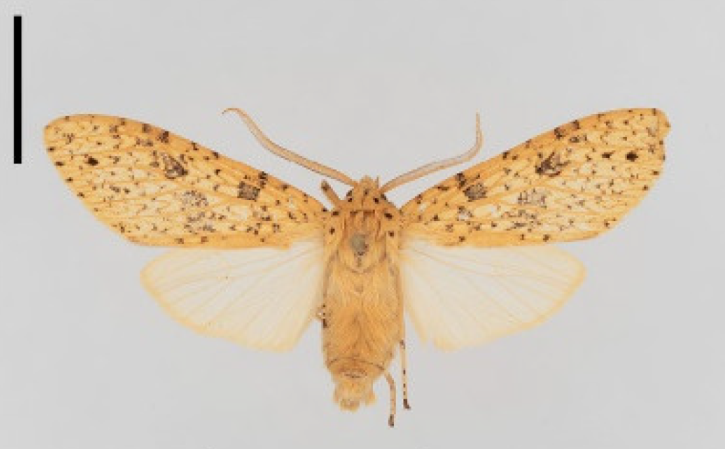

Scientific classification
- Domain: Eukaryota
- Kingdom: Animalia
- Phylum: Arthropoda
- Class: Insecta
- Order: Lepidoptera
- Superfamily: Noctuoidea
- Family: Erebidae
- Subfamily: Arctiinae
- Genus: Lophocampa
- Species: L. dognini

Binomial name
- Lophocampa dognini (Rothschild, 1910)

Synonyms
- Halisidota dognini Rothschild, 1910

= Lophocampa dognini =

Species of moth

Lophocampa dognini, the Rothschild's marbled tiger, is a moth of the family Erebidae. It was described by Walter Rothschild in 1910. It is found in Peru.

== Description ==
Male

Legs orange buff ringed with brown; pectus buff; palpi orange buff, extreme tip of third segment brown; head orange buff; antennae pale brown; thorax orange buff with black dots on tegulae and patagia; abdomen buff washed with a darker shade. Forewing deep orange buff, nervures orange, the whole wing sown with dark brown dots and spots, a quadrate dark brown patch in cell and a larger irregular one on discocellulars. Hindwing semihyaline buff.

Female

Similar but larger.

Length of forewing: male 25 mm and female 28 mm.
