= Lophocampa niveigutta =

Scientific classification
- Kingdom: Animalia
- Phylum: Arthropoda
- Class: Insecta
- Order: Lepidoptera
- Superfamily: Noctuoidea
- Family: Erebidae
- Subfamily: Arctiinae
- Genus: Lophocampa
- Species: L. niveigutta

Binomial name
- Lophocampa niveigutta (Walker, 1856)

Synonyms
- Halysidota niveigutta Walker, 1856

Species of moth

Lophocampa niveigutta is a moth of the family Erebidae. It was described by Francis Walker in 1856. It is found in Brazil and Colombia.

== Description ==
Male and female. Testaceous, paler beneath. Thorax with two pale brown stripes. Fore wings with several oblique undulating tawny lines, with two oblique brown bands, and with an exterior blackish brown dot; first band curved, irregular; second straight. Hind wings white. Male. — Antennae nearly as long as the body. Abdomen white at the tip. Length of the body 4 — 7 lines; of the wings 12 — 18 lines.

Note: A line is probably about 1/12 of an inch.
