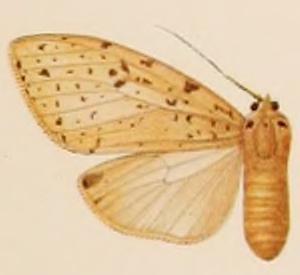

Scientific classification
- Domain: Eukaryota
- Kingdom: Animalia
- Phylum: Arthropoda
- Class: Insecta
- Order: Lepidoptera
- Superfamily: Noctuoidea
- Family: Erebidae
- Subfamily: Arctiinae
- Genus: Lophocampa
- Species: L. albescens

Binomial name
- Lophocampa albescens (Rothschild, 1909)

Synonyms
- Opharus albescens Rothschild, 1909

= Lophocampa albescens =

Species of moth

Lophocampa albescens is a moth of the family Erebidae. It was described by Walter Rothschild in 1909. It is found in French Guiana, Suriname and Venezuela.

== Description ==
=== Female ===
Head and thorax pale ochreous faintly tinged with brown, the vertex of head, patagia at base and near tips, and prothorax with black points; palpi with black mark on 2nd joint and the 3rd joint black; fore tibiae with black spot, the tarsi black except towards base, the mid tibia with black spot and the mid and hind tarsi black at extremities; abdomen yellow with lateral series of black striae, the ventral surface with small blackish spots on terminal segments. Forewing pale ochreous sparsely irrorated with small blackish spots and striae; more prominent antemedial spots below costa and above inner margin; small discoidal spots and one just beyond the cell; an obscure postmedial series of striae with more prominent spot below costa, excurved to vein 4, then incurved; a subterminal series of striae with more prominent spot at discal fold, some small spots on termen towards apex. Hindwing ochreous white.

Its wingspan is about 52 mm.
