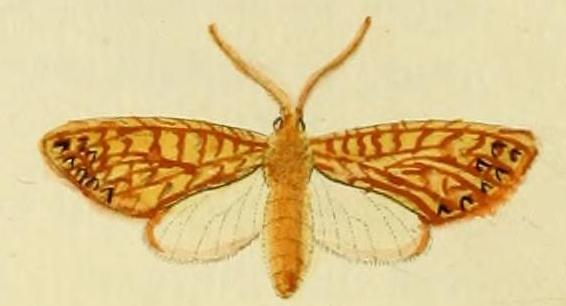

Scientific classification
- Kingdom: Animalia
- Phylum: Arthropoda
- Class: Insecta
- Order: Lepidoptera
- Superfamily: Noctuoidea
- Family: Erebidae
- Subfamily: Arctiinae
- Genus: Lophocampa
- Species: L. alsus

Binomial name
- Lophocampa alsus (Cramer, [1777])

Synonyms
- Phalaena alsus Cramer, [1777]; Halisidota alsus

= Lophocampa alsus =

Species of moth

Lophocampa alsus is a moth of the family Erebidae. It was described by Pieter Cramer in 1777. It is found in Suriname, and it may also occur in Colombia and Venezuela.
