= Lophocampa subfasciata =

Scientific classification
- Domain: Eukaryota
- Kingdom: Animalia
- Phylum: Arthropoda
- Class: Insecta
- Order: Lepidoptera
- Superfamily: Noctuoidea
- Family: Erebidae
- Subfamily: Arctiinae
- Genus: Lophocampa
- Species: L. subfasciata

Binomial name
- Lophocampa subfasciata (Rothschild, 1910)

Synonyms
- Halisidota subfasciata Rothschild, 1910

Species of moth

Lophocampa subfasciata is a moth of the family Erebidae. It was described by Rothschild in 1910. It is found in Paraguay.
