= Lophocampa tucumana =

Scientific classification
- Domain: Eukaryota
- Kingdom: Animalia
- Phylum: Arthropoda
- Class: Insecta
- Order: Lepidoptera
- Superfamily: Noctuoidea
- Family: Erebidae
- Subfamily: Arctiinae
- Genus: Lophocampa
- Species: L. tucumana

Binomial name
- Lophocampa tucumana (Rothschild, 1909)

Synonyms
- Halisidota tucumana Rothschild, 1909

Species of moth

Lophocampa tucumana is a moth of the family Erebidae. It was described by Rothschild in 1909. It is found in Argentina.
