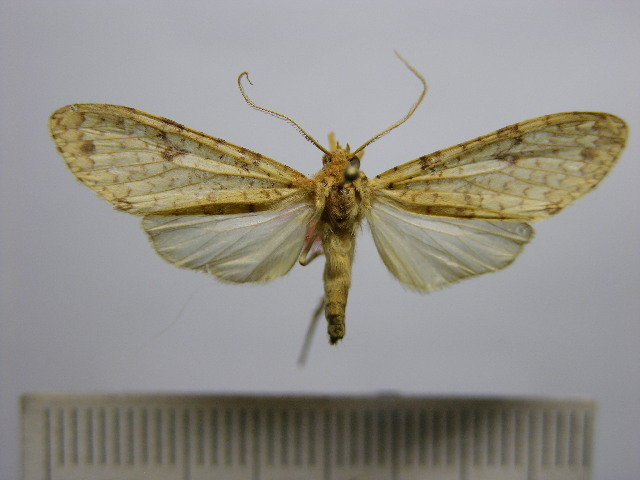

Scientific classification
- Domain: Eukaryota
- Kingdom: Animalia
- Phylum: Arthropoda
- Class: Insecta
- Order: Lepidoptera
- Superfamily: Noctuoidea
- Family: Erebidae
- Subfamily: Arctiinae
- Genus: Lophocampa
- Species: L. seruba

Binomial name
- Lophocampa seruba (Herrich-Schäffer, [1855])

Synonyms
- Charidea seruba Herrich-Schäffer, [1855]; Halisidota seruba; Thalesa seruba; Halisidota albipuncta Rothschild, 1909; Thalesa parva Rothschild, 1909

= Lophocampa seruba =

Species of moth

Lophocampa seruba is a moth of the family Erebidae. It is found in Brazil.

== Subspecies ==
- Lophocampa seruba seruba (Brazil)
- Lophocampa seruba parva (Rothschild, 1909) (Brazil)
