= Lophocampa nimbifacta =

Scientific classification
- Kingdom: Animalia
- Phylum: Arthropoda
- Class: Insecta
- Order: Lepidoptera
- Superfamily: Noctuoidea
- Family: Erebidae
- Subfamily: Arctiinae
- Genus: Lophocampa
- Species: L. nimbifacta

Binomial name
- Lophocampa nimbifacta (Dyar, 1912)

Synonyms
- Halisidota nimbifacta Dyar, 1912

Species of moth

Lophocampa nimbifacta is a moth of the family Erebidae. It was described by Harrison Gray Dyar Jr. in 1912. It is found in Mexico.

== Description ==
Dyar's original description from 1912:

Pale straw-yellow, the hind wings yellowish white, semihyaline. Fore wings opaque, pale yellow, the markings pale brown, faint and nearly obliterate; these are in the form of chainlike bands, with a dark discoloration at the end of the cell and a small speck in the submarginal band between veins 5 and 6. The markings are much as in Halisidota thyopliora Schaus but very much fainter as well as being more regular and chainlike. Expanse: Male, 22 mm.; female, 30 mm.
