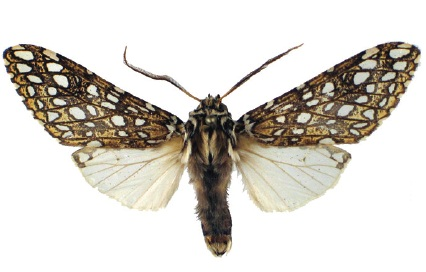
- Male

Scientific classification
- Domain: Eukaryota
- Kingdom: Animalia
- Phylum: Arthropoda
- Class: Insecta
- Order: Lepidoptera
- Superfamily: Noctuoidea
- Family: Erebidae
- Subfamily: Arctiinae
- Genus: Lophocampa
- Species: L. herbini

Binomial name
- Lophocampa herbini Vincent & Laguerre, 2013

= Lophocampa herbini =

Species of moth

Lophocampa herbini is a moth in the family Erebidae. It was described by Vincent & Laguerre in 2013. It is found in Bolivia (Santa Cruz, Cochabamba) and Peru (Cuzco).

== Description ==
The forewings are brown, irrorated with pale or deep brown. One whitish spot with one yellow and two small black dots are found at the base. There is also a series of bands formed by whitish spots and organized as follows: a broken antemedial band, a slightly curved medial band, and a sinuous postmedial band. The hindwings are whitish and slightly tinged with grey on the apex and along the costa. The ventral pattern is more contrasting, deep brown centered with yellowish-brown.

== Etymology ==
The species is named in honor of Daniel Herbin, specialist of Saturniidae.
