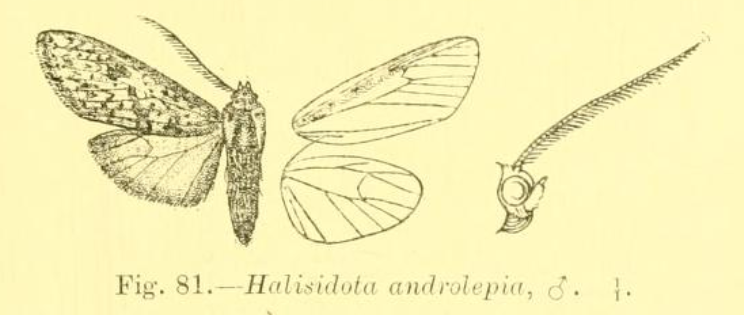

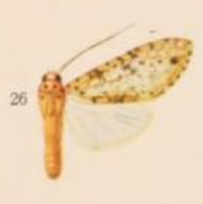

Scientific classification
- Domain: Eukaryota
- Kingdom: Animalia
- Phylum: Arthropoda
- Class: Insecta
- Order: Lepidoptera
- Superfamily: Noctuoidea
- Family: Erebidae
- Subfamily: Arctiinae
- Genus: Lophocampa
- Species: L. endrolepia

Binomial name
- Lophocampa endrolepia (Dognin, 1908)

Synonyms
- Halisidota endrolepia Dognin, 1908; Halisidota sobrinoides Rochschild, 1910

= Lophocampa endrolepia =

Species of moth

Lophocampa endrolepia is a moth of the family Erebidae. It was described by Paul Dognin in 1908. It is found in Ecuador.

== Description ==
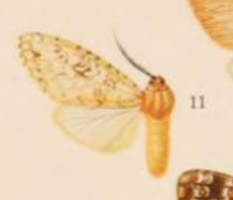
Lophocampa endrolepia - female

Forewing of male with streak of androconia on subcostal nervure on underside.

Male

Head, thorax, and abdomen bright orange yellow, the 1st and 2nd joints of palpi, the head between antennae and on vertex, the tegulae, shoulders, and patagia with black points; tibiae and tarsi with black spots. Forewing bright orange yellow, the interspaces of discal area rather paler; a black point at base of costa and subbasal points on costa and below the cell; numerous small brown lunules forming ill-defined double minutely dentate subbasal, antemedial, medial, postmedial, and subterminal bands, the three last oblique, and all with more or less developed black marks on them at costa and inner margin; a diffused black discoidal spot and small black spot on subterminal line at discal fold; a series of small black spots on termen and cilia. Hindwing pale semihyaline yellow.

Wingspan 44 mm.
