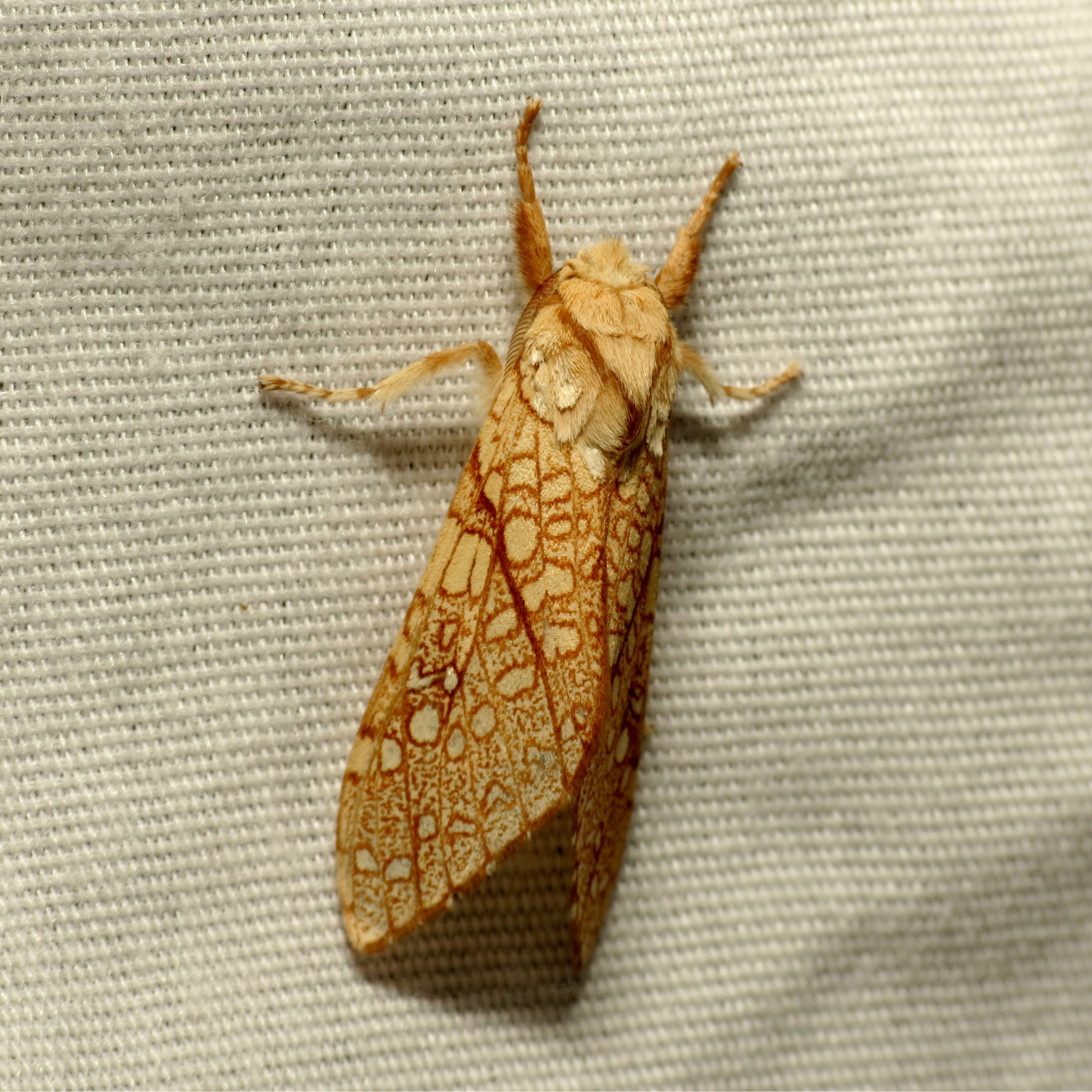

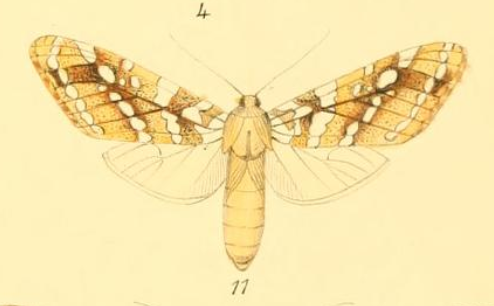

Scientific classification
- Domain: Eukaryota
- Kingdom: Animalia
- Phylum: Arthropoda
- Class: Insecta
- Order: Lepidoptera
- Superfamily: Noctuoidea
- Family: Erebidae
- Subfamily: Arctiinae
- Genus: Lophocampa
- Species: L. mixta

Binomial name
- Lophocampa mixta (Neumoegen, 1882)

Synonyms
- Halesidota mixta Neumoegen, 1882; Halisidota pseudocarye Rothschild, 1909

= Lophocampa mixta =

Species of moth

Lophocampa mixta is a moth of the family Erebidae. It was described by Berthold Neumoegen in 1882. It is found in the United States in Arizona, Texas

The wingspan is about 37 mm.

The larvae feed on Quercus emoryi.
