= Lophocampa pseudomaculata =

Scientific classification
- Domain: Eukaryota
- Kingdom: Animalia
- Phylum: Arthropoda
- Class: Insecta
- Order: Lepidoptera
- Superfamily: Noctuoidea
- Family: Erebidae
- Subfamily: Arctiinae
- Genus: Lophocampa
- Species: L. pseudomaculata

Binomial name
- Lophocampa pseudomaculata (Rothschild, 1910)

Synonyms
- Halisidota pseudomaculata Rothschild, 1910

Species of moth

Lophocampa pseudomaculata is a moth of the family Erebidae. It was described by Walter Rothschild in 1910. It is found in Brazil.
