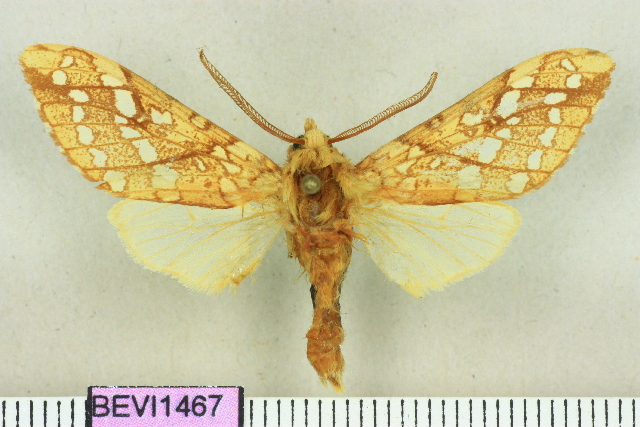

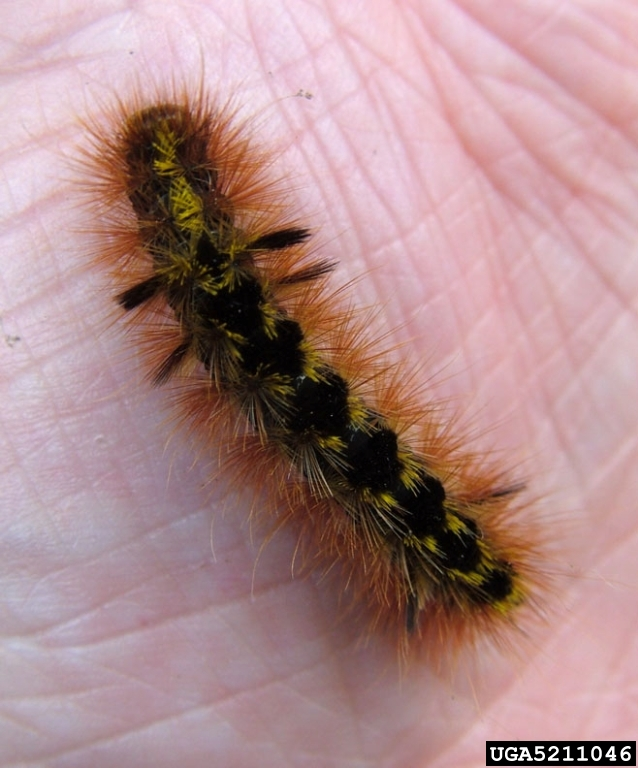

Scientific classification
- Kingdom: Animalia
- Phylum: Arthropoda
- Clade: Pancrustacea
- Class: Insecta
- Order: Lepidoptera
- Superfamily: Noctuoidea
- Family: Erebidae
- Subfamily: Arctiinae
- Genus: Lophocampa
- Species: L. argentata

Binomial name
- Lophocampa argentata (Packard, 1864)

Synonyms
- Halysidota argentata Packard, 1864; Halisidota subalpina French, 1890

= Lophocampa argentata =

Species of moth

Lophocampa argentata, the silver-spotted tiger moth, is a species of moth in the family Erebidae. It was described by Packard in 1864. It is found from British Columbia to southern California, and east to Arizona, Nevada, New Mexico, Colorado, Utah, Wyoming and possibly to northern Mexico.

== Description ==
Caterpillars are brown or reddish-brown and very hairy, with bundles of black and yellow hairs along the back. The hairs on caterpillars and pupae can irritate human skin.

Adult moths have brown forewings with silvery spots. There are light brown and dark brown variations. The spots are irregular, each outlined in black and aligned in loose rows. The hair-like scales on the head and thorax (dorsal tuft) have a unique pattern that can be useful in identification.

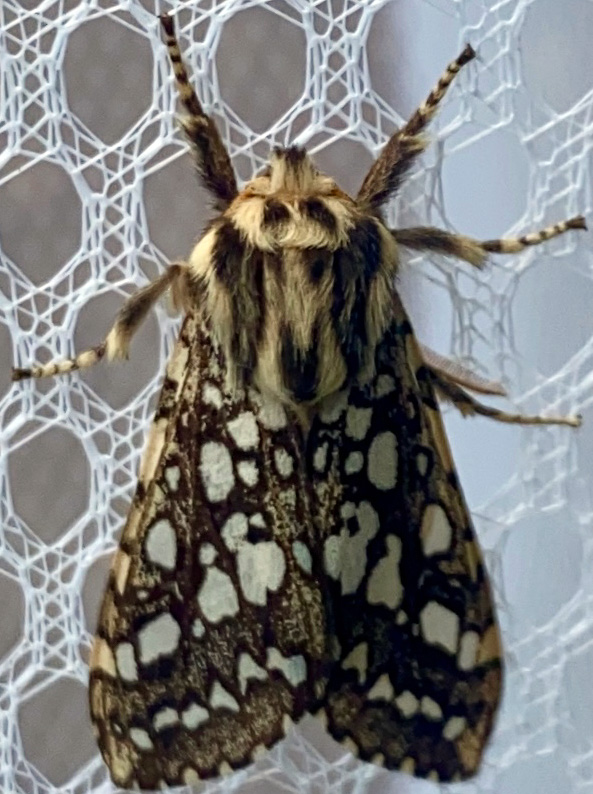
Lophocampa argentata in Oregon

Original species description by Alpheus Packard in 1864:

"Halesidota argentata n. sp. - [Female]. Head and thorax pale buff yellow. Base and side of the front walnut brown. Centre of prothoracic pieces brown. Patagia margined with brown, within very broadly so.

Primaries walnut brown, with five rows of large irregular round or ovate silver white spots, except the costal spots, which are buff yellow. Two basal spots yellow. Internal margin buff as far as the first line, which is slightly curved, the middle dot of which last is much smaller than the others. In the second line, which is straight, the submedian spot is transversely broad, oblong. Costal spot largest. The third row does not extend to the inner margin. The spots making up the marginal and last row are uniformly round. Fringe and termination of nervules pale buff.

Secondaries white. Middle of the costa and apex and discal dot brown. Beneath much as above, a little paler. Legs buff, base of femora and tips of tibiæ and tarsi broadly annulated with brown. Abdomen buff above, beneath brown. Length of body, .85. Exp. wings, 2.05.

— A. Packard, Proceedings of the Entomological Society of Philadelphia (1864)

== Life cycle ==
Lophocampa argentata produce one generation per year. In mid-summer, moths lay clusters of eggs on needles and small branches. Larvae hatch within around three weeks. Groups of larvae produce tents in their host plants, remaining in the tent through winter and re-emerging in the spring. In the warmer weather, the larvae feed individually before pupating in late spring in brown cocoons attached to plants or on the forest floor.

== Distribution and host plants ==
Larvae of this moth utilize numerous host plants in western North America, generally conifers, and notably the Douglas fir. Larvae feeding on host plant needles can cause defoliation.

Lophocampa argentata is found from British Columbia to southern California, and east to Arizona, Nevada, New Mexico, Colorado, Utah, Wyoming and possibly to northern Mexico. The subspecies L. a. subalpina occurs in the Rocky Mountain region, where it feeds on pinyon and juniper; L. a. sobrina is found in California and feeds on Monterey pine.

== Subspecies ==
- Lophocampa argentata argentata
- Lophocampa argentata subalpina (French, 1890) (Rocky Mountains, Colorado)
- Lophocampa argentata sobrina (California)
