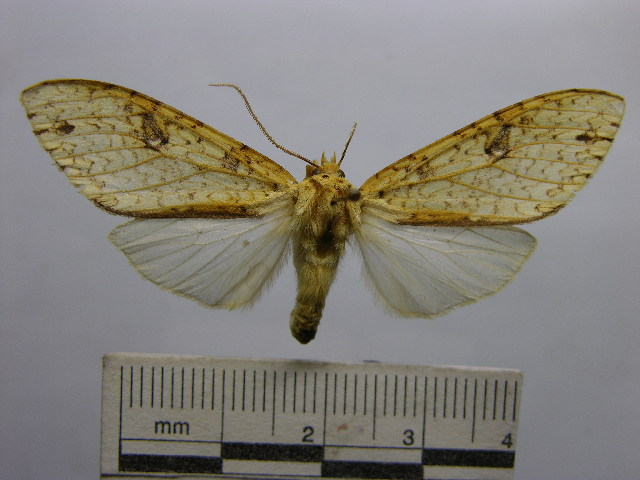
- L. d. distincta
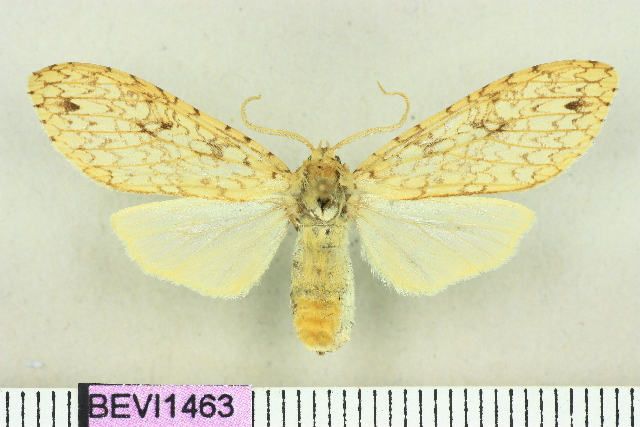
- L. d. brasilibia

Scientific classification
- Domain: Eukaryota
- Kingdom: Animalia
- Phylum: Arthropoda
- Class: Insecta
- Order: Lepidoptera
- Superfamily: Noctuoidea
- Family: Erebidae
- Subfamily: Arctiinae
- Genus: Lophocampa
- Species: L. distincta

Binomial name
- Lophocampa distincta (Rothschild, 1909)

Synonyms
- Halysidota distincta Rothschild, 1909; Halisidota brunnescens Rothschild, 1909; Halysidota brasilibia Strand, 1919; Halisidota pallida Rothschild, 1910 (preocc.); Halysidota binominata Strand, 1919; Halisidota distincta meridionalis Rothschild, 1910 (preocc.)

= Lophocampa distincta =

Species of moth

Lophocampa distincta, is a moth of the family Erebidae. It was described by Walter Rothschild in 1910. It is found in Peru, Brazil, Argentina, Colombia and Ecuador.

Wingspan for the male 26 mm and for the female 29 mm.

The larvae feed on Gunnera species.

== Subspecies ==
- L. d. distincta (Peru, Ecuador)
- L. d. binominata (Strand, 1919) (Argentina)
- L. d. brasilibia (Strand, 1919) (Brazil, Peru)
- L. d. brunnescens (Rothschild, 1909) (Peru)
- L. d. obsolescens (Rothschild, 1910) (Colombia, Ecuador)
