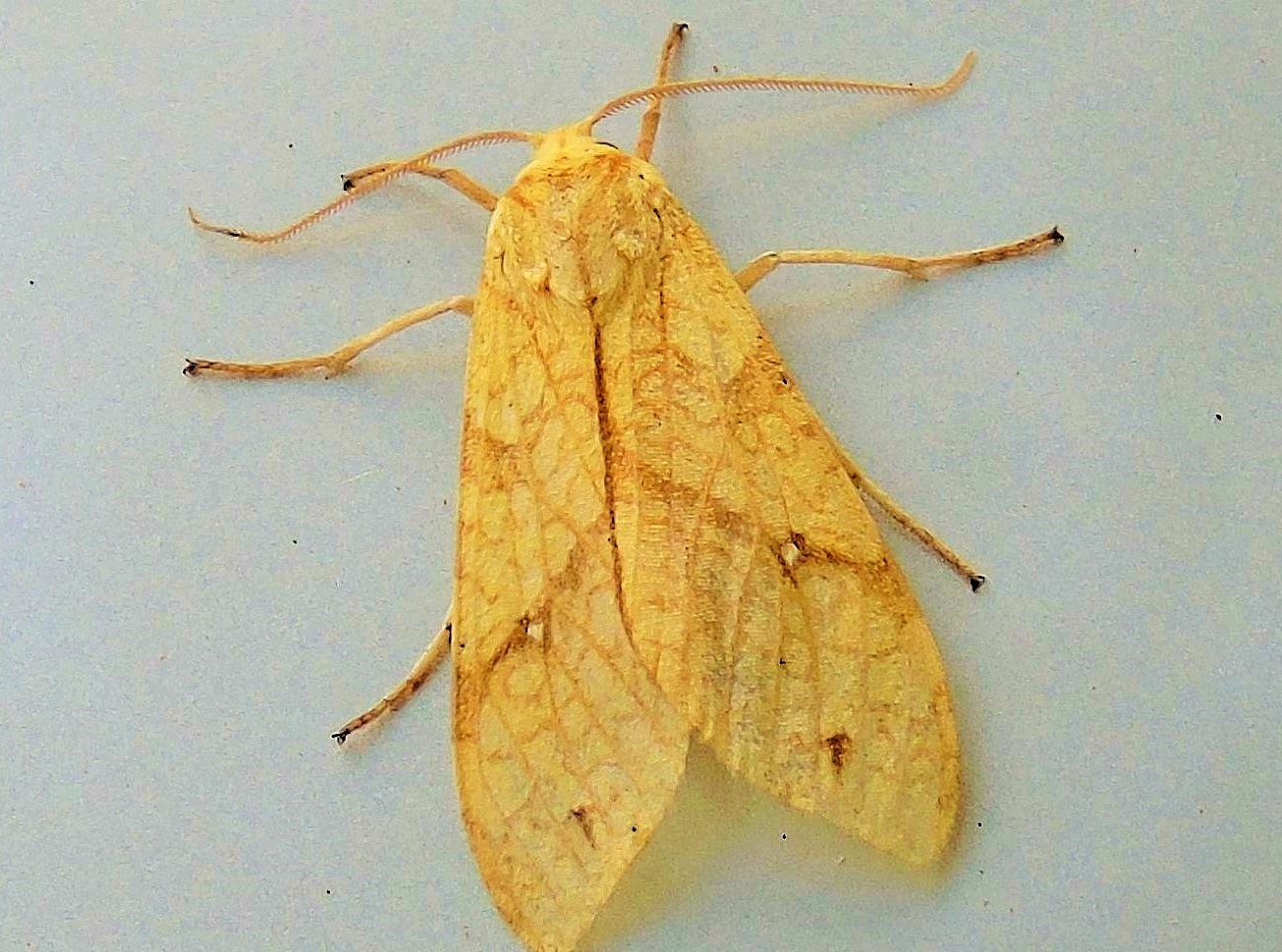

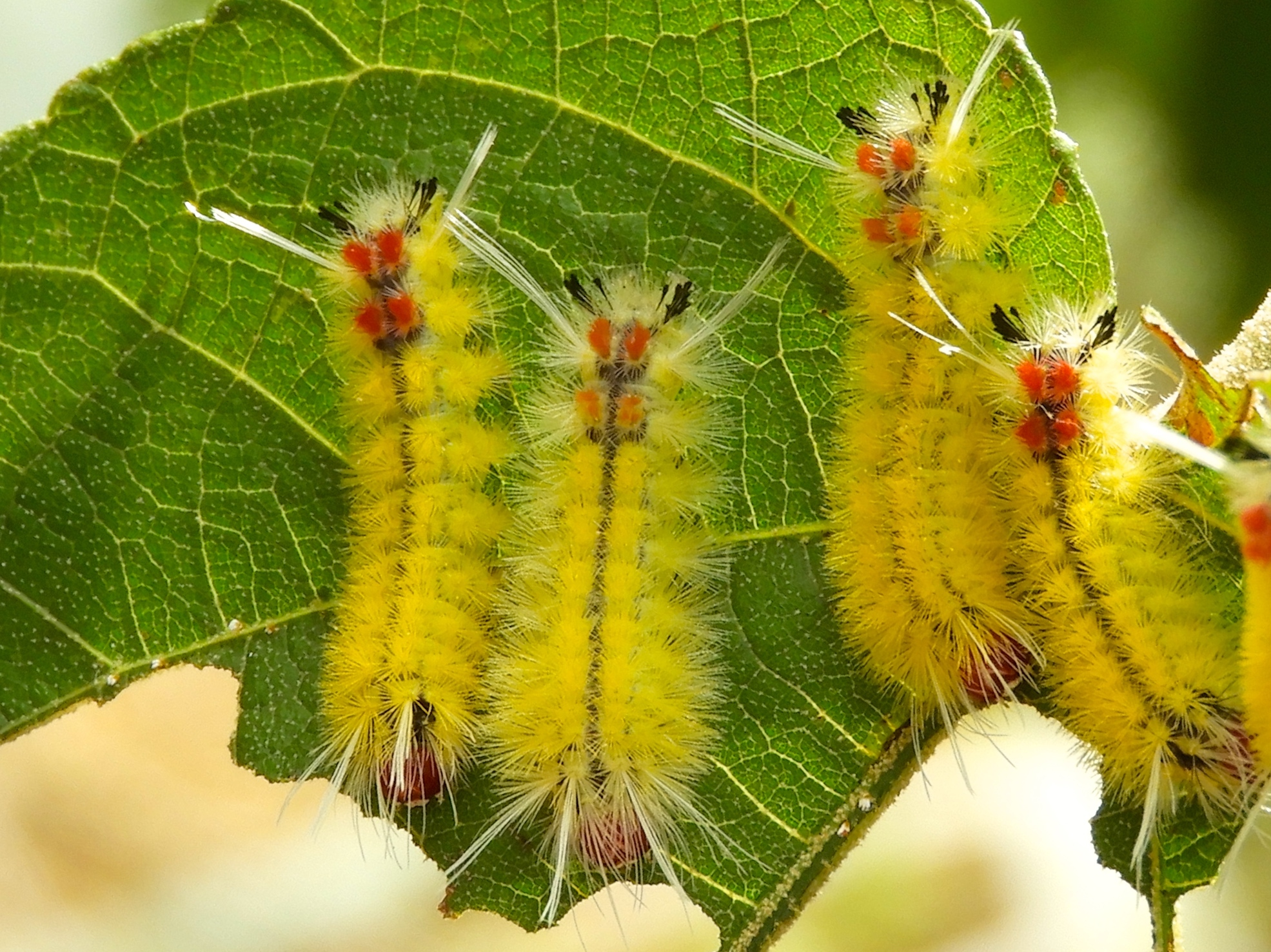
- Adult (top) and larvae (bottom)

Scientific classification
- Kingdom: Animalia
- Phylum: Arthropoda
- Clade: Pancrustacea
- Class: Insecta
- Order: Lepidoptera
- Superfamily: Noctuoidea
- Family: Erebidae
- Subfamily: Arctiinae
- Genus: Lophocampa
- Species: L. annulosa

Binomial name
- Lophocampa annulosa (Walker, 1855)

Synonyms
- Halesidota annulosa Walker, 1855; Halisidota niveigutta Druce, 1856

= Lophocampa annulosa =

Species of moth

Lophocampa annulosa, the Santa Ana tussock moth, is a moth of the family Erebidae. It was described by Francis Walker in 1855. It is found in the south-western US (southern Texas, southern Arizona), Mexico, Costa Rica, Ecuador, Venezuela, Peru, Suriname, Brazil, Honduras, Argentina and Trinidad.

Larvae have been recorded feeding on Aegiphila falcata.
