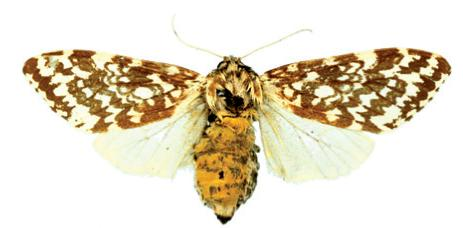

Scientific classification
- Kingdom: Animalia
- Phylum: Arthropoda
- Class: Insecta
- Order: Lepidoptera
- Superfamily: Noctuoidea
- Family: Erebidae
- Subfamily: Arctiinae
- Genus: Lophocampa
- Species: L. alternata

Binomial name
- Lophocampa alternata (Grote, 1867)

Synonyms
- Euhalisidota alternata Grote, 1867; Halisidota alternata

= Lophocampa alternata =

Species of moth

Lophocampa alternata is a moth of the family Erebidae. It was described by Augustus Radcliffe Grote in 1867. It is known from Cuba.
