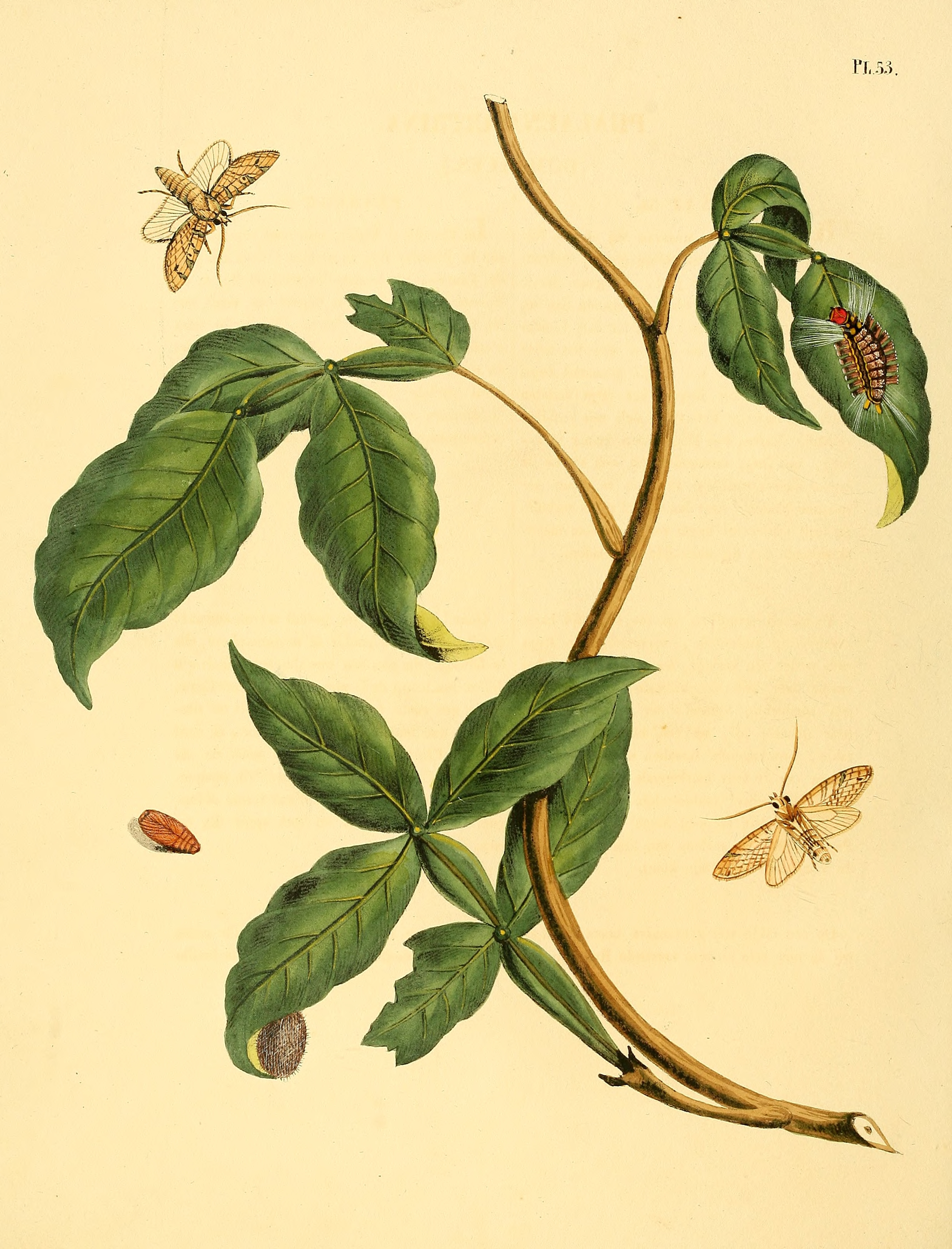
- Pl. 53 (Sepp)

Scientific classification
- Domain: Eukaryota
- Kingdom: Animalia
- Phylum: Arthropoda
- Class: Insecta
- Order: Lepidoptera
- Superfamily: Noctuoidea
- Family: Erebidae
- Subfamily: Arctiinae
- Genus: Lophocampa
- Species: L. citrina

Binomial name
- Lophocampa citrina (Sepp, [1843])

Synonyms
- Phalaena citrina Sepp, [1843]; Thalesa citrina Hampson, 1901

= Lophocampa citrina =

Species of moth

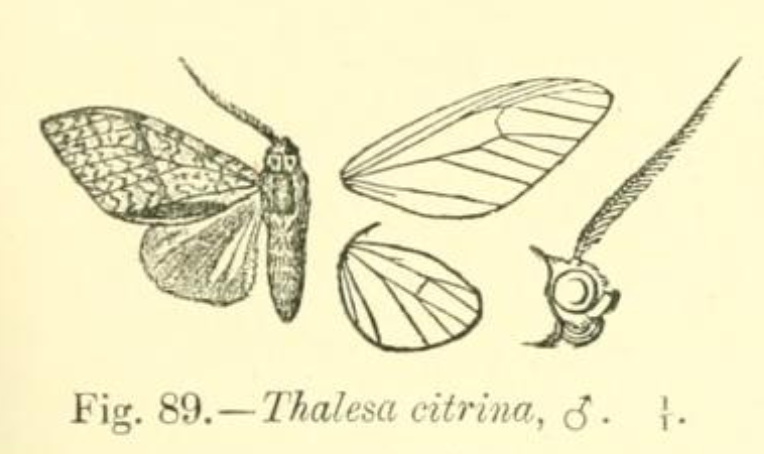
as Thalesia citrina

Lophocampa citrina is a moth of the family Erebidae. It was described by Jan Sepp in 1843 (or thereabouts) as Phalaena citrina. It is found in Mexico, Honduras, Panama, French Guiana, Brazil, Venezuela and the Amazon region.

== Description ==
=== Male ===
Yellow; head and thorax slightly marked with brown; legs with fuscous streaks; abdomen whitish below. Forewing with numerous irregularly-waved fine brown lines; the antemedial line defined on outer side by a brownish patch from costa to median nervure; an oblique, almost straight, medial line expanding at costa and with a silvery spot beyond it at lower angle of cell; a subterminal black point above vein 5; the lobe of inner margin dark brown. Hindwing yellowish white.

=== Female ===
With fine brown line on inner margin.

Wingspan for the male 30 mm and 40 mm for the female.

=== Larva ===
Reddish brown; head crimson with darker sutures; the first two somites with long white forwardly directed hair arising from pale tubercles; the other somites with dorsal and lateral brushes of pinkish and brown hair; some lateral yellow marks; the terminal somite with some long white hair directed backwards, and a pair of yellow brushes. Cocoon and pupa brown. Food plant, Inga vera.
