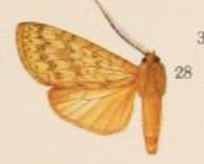

Scientific classification
- Kingdom: Animalia
- Phylum: Arthropoda
- Class: Insecta
- Order: Lepidoptera
- Superfamily: Noctuoidea
- Family: Erebidae
- Subfamily: Arctiinae
- Genus: Lophocampa
- Species: L. atomosa

Binomial name
- Lophocampa atomosa (Walker, 1855)

Synonyms
- Halesidota atomosa Walker, 1855; Euhalisidota fasciata Grote, 1867; Halisidota mendax Möschler, 1886; Halisidota moeschleri Rothschild, 1909; Lophocampa fasciata Grote, 1867

= Lophocampa atomosa =

Species of moth

Lophocampa atomosa is a moth of the family Erebidae. It was described by Francis Walker in 1855. It is found on Jamaica and Cuba and in Ecuador.

Wingspan is 38 mm for the male and 44 mm for the female.
