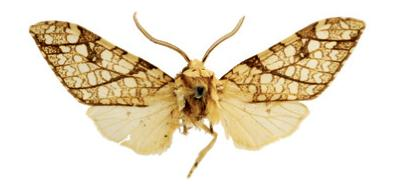

Scientific classification
- Kingdom: Animalia
- Phylum: Arthropoda
- Clade: Pancrustacea
- Class: Insecta
- Order: Lepidoptera
- Superfamily: Noctuoidea
- Family: Erebidae
- Subfamily: Arctiinae
- Genus: Lophocampa
- Species: L. propinqua

Binomial name
- Lophocampa propinqua (H. Edwards, 1884)

Synonyms
- Halysidota propinqua H. Edwards, 1884

= Lophocampa propinqua =

Species of moth

Lophocampa propinqua is a moth of the family Erebidae first described by Henry Edwards in 1884. It is known from Mexico and Central America.

== Taxonomy ==
Edwards described Lophocampa propinqua as a variation of Lophocampa caryae based on a single male from Mexico. The taxon propinqua was placed by Allan Watson and David T. Goodger as a valid species in the genus Lophocampa. The different forewing pattern, in particular the interrupted medial band, the narrower uncus and the longer valvae of the male genitalia justify this placement as a species distinct from the North American Lophocampa caryae.
