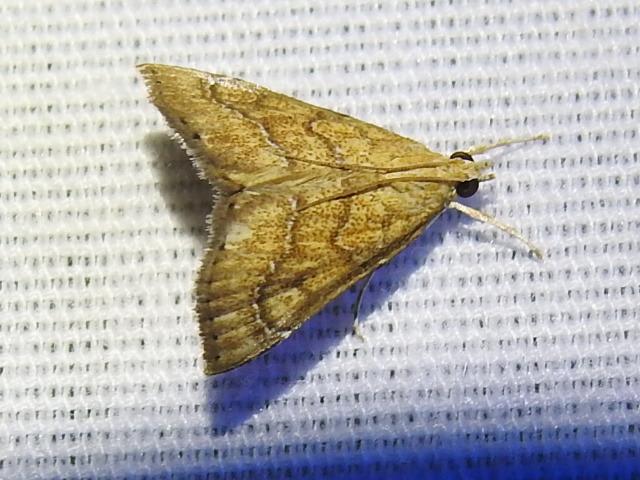
- Aethiophysa dualis, Texas

Scientific classification
- Kingdom: Animalia
- Phylum: Arthropoda
- Clade: Pancrustacea
- Class: Insecta
- Order: Lepidoptera
- Family: Crambidae
- Subfamily: Glaphyriinae
- Genus: Aethiophysa
- Species: A. dualis

Binomial name
- Aethiophysa dualis Barnes & McDunnough, 1914

Synonyms
- Glaphyria dualis Barnes & McDunnough, 1914

= Aethiophysa dualis =

Species of moth

Aethiophysa dualis is a moth in the family Crambidae first described by William Barnes and James Halliday McDunnough in 1914. It is found in North America, where it has been recorded from South Texas.
