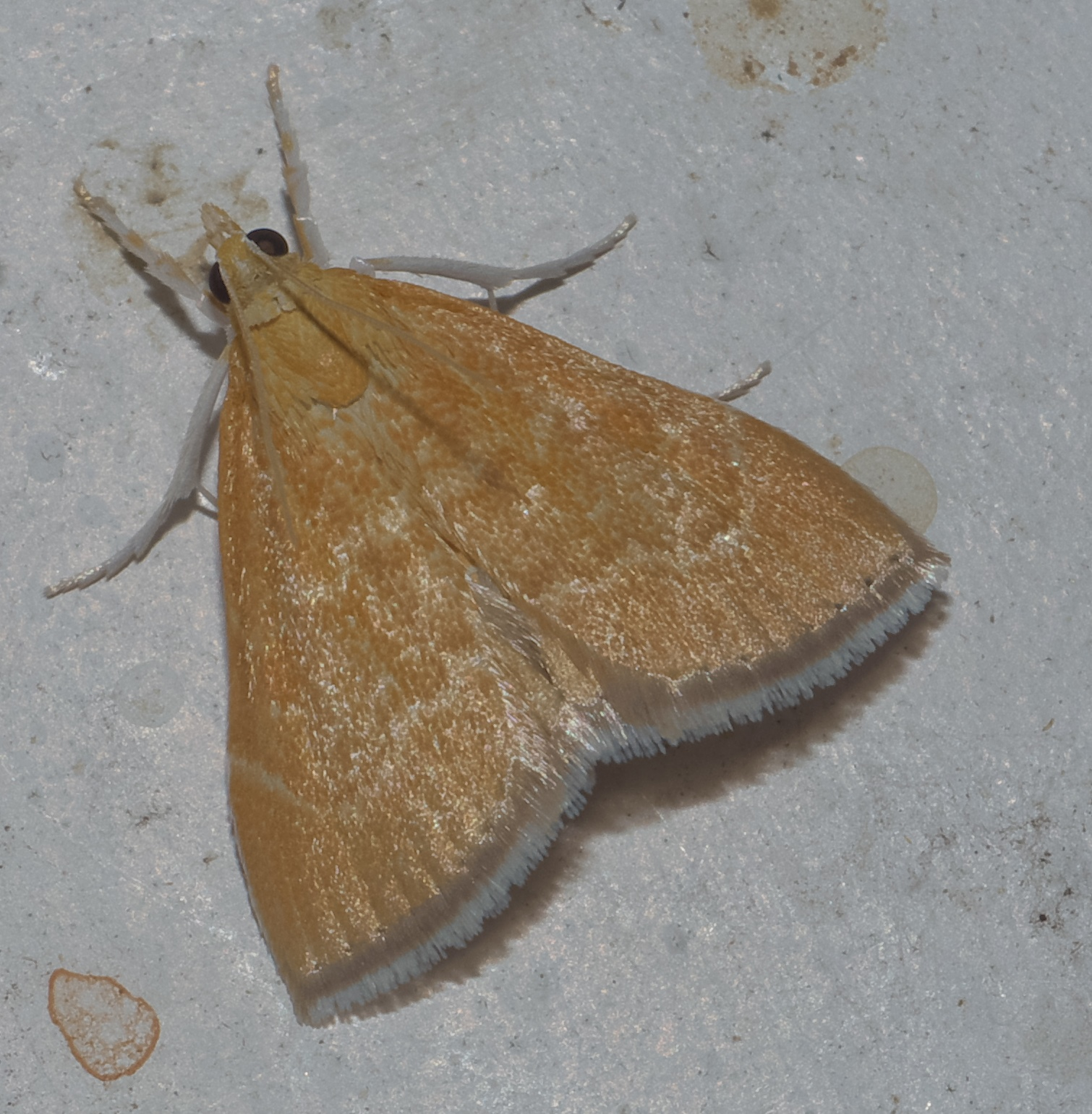
- Aethiophysa invisalis

Scientific classification
- Kingdom: Animalia
- Phylum: Arthropoda
- Clade: Pancrustacea
- Class: Insecta
- Order: Lepidoptera
- Family: Crambidae
- Subfamily: Glaphyriinae
- Genus: Aethiophysa
- Species: A. invisalis

Binomial name
- Aethiophysa invisalis (Guenée, 1854)

Synonyms
- Ebulea invisalis Guenée, 1854; Homophysa lentiflualis Zeller, 1872

= Aethiophysa invisalis =

Species of moth

Aethiophysa invisalis is a moth in the family Crambidae. It was described by Achille Guenée in 1854. It is found in North, Central, and South America, especially in the United States east of the Rocky Mountains.
