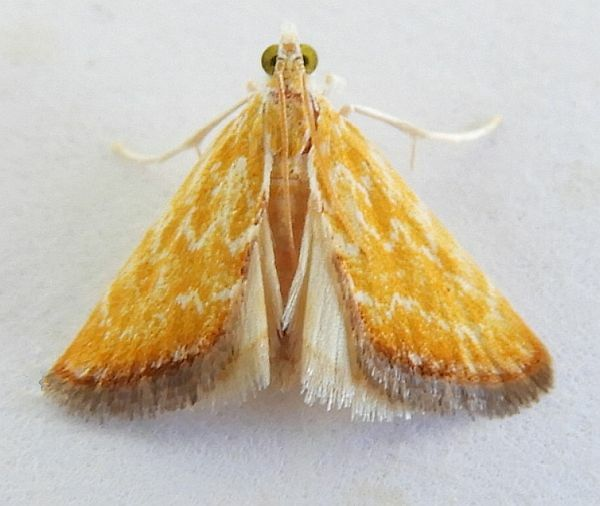
- Aethiophysa delicata, Florida

Scientific classification
- Kingdom: Animalia
- Phylum: Arthropoda
- Clade: Pancrustacea
- Class: Insecta
- Order: Lepidoptera
- Family: Crambidae
- Subfamily: Glaphyriinae
- Genus: Aethiophysa
- Species: A. delicata

Binomial name
- Aethiophysa delicata Munroe, 1964

= Aethiophysa delicata =

Species of moth

Aethiophysa delicata is a moth in the family Crambidae. It is found in North America, where it has been recorded from Florida.
