= Dichogama innocua =

Scientific classification
- Kingdom: Animalia
- Phylum: Arthropoda
- Class: Insecta
- Order: Lepidoptera
- Family: Crambidae
- Genus: Dichogama
- Species: D. innocua

Binomial name
- Dichogama innocua (Fabricius, 1793)

Synonyms
- Bombyx innocua Fabricius, 1793; Dichogama krugii Möschler, 1890

Species of moth

Dichogama innocua is a moth in the family Crambidae. It was described by Johan Christian Fabricius in 1793. It is found in South America and on the Antilles. It has also been recorded from Costa Rica.

The wingspan is about 26 mm.
