= Eupoca sanctalis =

Scientific classification
- Kingdom: Animalia
- Phylum: Arthropoda
- Class: Insecta
- Order: Lepidoptera
- Family: Crambidae
- Genus: Eupoca
- Species: E. sanctalis

Binomial name
- Eupoca sanctalis (Schaus, 1912)

Synonyms
- Scybalista sanctalis Schaus, 1912

Species of moth

Eupoca sanctalis is a moth in the family Crambidae. It is found from central Costa Rica south to northern Colombia.
