= Dichogama prognealis =

Scientific classification
- Kingdom: Animalia
- Phylum: Arthropoda
- Class: Insecta
- Order: Lepidoptera
- Family: Crambidae
- Genus: Dichogama
- Species: D. prognealis

Binomial name
- Dichogama prognealis (Druce, 1895)

Synonyms
- Carbaca prognealis Druce, 1895

Species of moth

Dichogama prognealis is a moth in the family Crambidae. It was described by Herbert Druce in 1895. It is found in Costa Rica and Ecuador.

The forewings are pearly-white with a large yellow patch at the anal angle. There is a series of four glossy bluish-black bands extending across the wing from the costal margin as far as the yellow colour, and there is a small round black spot at the anal angle. The inner margin is edged with black near the base. The hindwings are pale yellowish-white.
