= Alatuncusia fulvescens =

Scientific classification
- Kingdom: Animalia
- Phylum: Arthropoda
- Clade: Pancrustacea
- Class: Insecta
- Order: Lepidoptera
- Family: Crambidae
- Genus: Alatuncusia
- Species: A. fulvescens

Binomial name
- Alatuncusia fulvescens (Hampson, 1918)

Synonyms
- Lygropia fulvescens Hampson, 1918

Species of moth

Alatuncusia fulvescens is a moth in the family Crambidae. It was described by George Hampson in 1918. It is found in Colombia.
