= Alatuncusia canalis =

Scientific classification
- Kingdom: Animalia
- Phylum: Arthropoda
- Clade: Pancrustacea
- Class: Insecta
- Order: Lepidoptera
- Family: Crambidae
- Genus: Alatuncusia
- Species: A. canalis

Binomial name
- Alatuncusia canalis (Walker, 1866)

Synonyms
- Scybalista canalis Walker, 1866

Species of moth

Alatuncusia canalis is a moth in the family Crambidae. It is found on Hispaniola.
