= Eupoca polyorma =

Scientific classification
- Kingdom: Animalia
- Phylum: Arthropoda
- Class: Insecta
- Order: Lepidoptera
- Family: Crambidae
- Genus: Eupoca
- Species: E. polyorma

Binomial name
- Eupoca polyorma (Meyrick, 1936)

Synonyms
- Scybalista polyorma Meyrick, 1936

Species of moth

Eupoca polyorma is a moth in the family Crambidae. It is found in Venezuela.
