= Pseudoligostigma odulphalis =

Scientific classification
- Kingdom: Animalia
- Phylum: Arthropoda
- Class: Insecta
- Order: Lepidoptera
- Family: Crambidae
- Genus: Pseudoligostigma
- Species: P. odulphalis

Binomial name
- Pseudoligostigma odulphalis (Schaus, 1924)

Synonyms
- Aulacodes odulphalis Schaus, 1924

Species of moth

Pseudoligostigma odulphalis is a moth in the family Crambidae. It was described by Schaus in 1924. It is found in Guatemala.
