= Nephrogramma separata =

Scientific classification
- Domain: Eukaryota
- Kingdom: Animalia
- Phylum: Arthropoda
- Class: Insecta
- Order: Lepidoptera
- Family: Crambidae
- Genus: Nephrogramma
- Species: N. separata

Binomial name
- Nephrogramma separata Munroe, 1972

Species of moth

Nephrogramma separata is a moth in the family Crambidae. It is found in North America, where it has been recorded from Arizona, New Mexico and Texas.

The length of the forewings is 8–10 mm. Adults are on wing from July to September.
