= Scybalistodes =

Scientific classification
- Kingdom: Animalia
- Phylum: Arthropoda
- Class: Insecta
- Order: Lepidoptera
- Family: Crambidae
- Subfamily: Glaphyriinae
- Genus: Scybalistodes; Munroe, 1964

Genus of moths

Scybalistodes is a genus of moths of the family Crambidae described by Eugene G. Munroe in 1964.

== Species ==
- Scybalistodes fortis
- Scybalistodes illosalis (Dyar, 1914)
- Scybalistodes periculosalis Dyar, 1908
- Scybalistodes prusalis (Druce, 1895)
- Scybalistodes reducta
- Scybalistodes regularis
- Scybalistodes rivuloides
- Scybalistodes vermiculalis
- Scybalistodes violetalis
