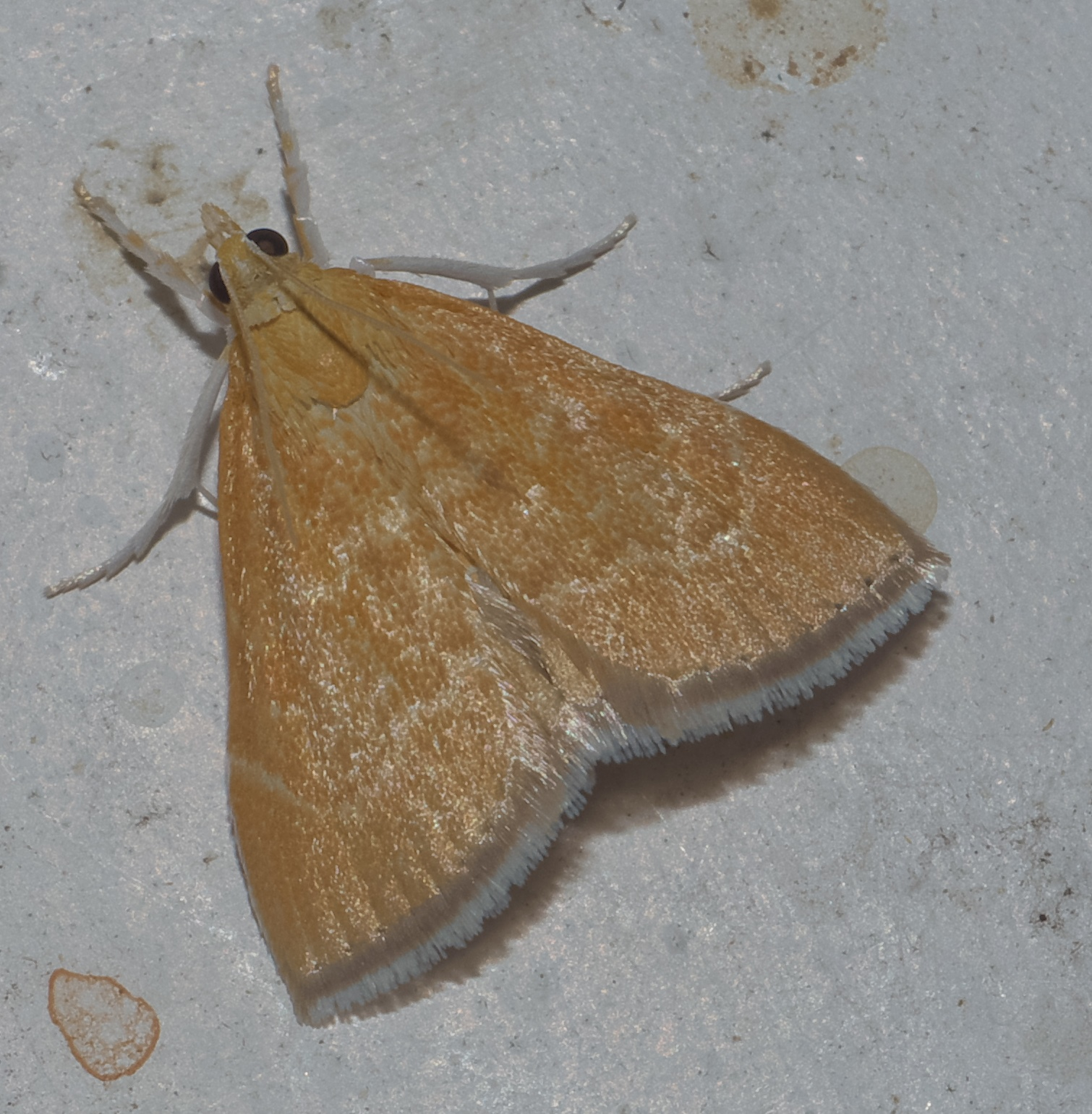
- Aethiophysa invisalis

Scientific classification
- Kingdom: Animalia
- Phylum: Arthropoda
- Clade: Pancrustacea
- Class: Insecta
- Order: Lepidoptera
- Family: Crambidae
- Subfamily: Glaphyriinae
- Genus: Aethiophysa; Munroe, 1964

= Aethiophysa =

Genus of moths

Aethiophysa is a genus of moths of the family Crambidae. They are found in North America and the Neotropics, including Caribbean countries.

== Species ==
- Aethiophysa acutipennis Munroe, 1964
- Aethiophysa consimilis Munroe, 1964
- Aethiophysa crambidalis
- Aethiophysa delicata Munroe, 1964
- Aethiophysa dichordalis (Hampson, 1912)
- Aethiophysa dimotalis Walker, 1865
- Aethiophysa dualis Barnes & McDunnough, 1914
- Aethiophysa extorris (Warren, 1892)
- Aethiophysa falcatalis (Hampson, 1895)
- Aethiophysa invisalis (Guenée, 1854)
- Aethiophysa lentiflualis Zeller, 1872
- Aethiophysa savoralis (Schaus, 1920)
- Aethiophysa surinamensis Munroe, 1964
