= Aethiophysa crambidalis =

Scientific classification
- Kingdom: Animalia
- Phylum: Arthropoda
- Clade: Pancrustacea
- Class: Insecta
- Order: Lepidoptera
- Family: Crambidae
- Genus: Aethiophysa
- Species: A. crambidalis

Binomial name
- Aethiophysa crambidalis (Snellen, 1887)

Synonyms
- Homophysa crambidalis Snellen, 1887; Glaphyria crambidalis

Species of moth

Aethiophysa crambidalis is a moth in the family Crambidae. It is found on Curaçao.

The wingspan is 15–16 mm. The forewings are ochreous brown with two dark grey crosslines. The hindwings are shining white.
