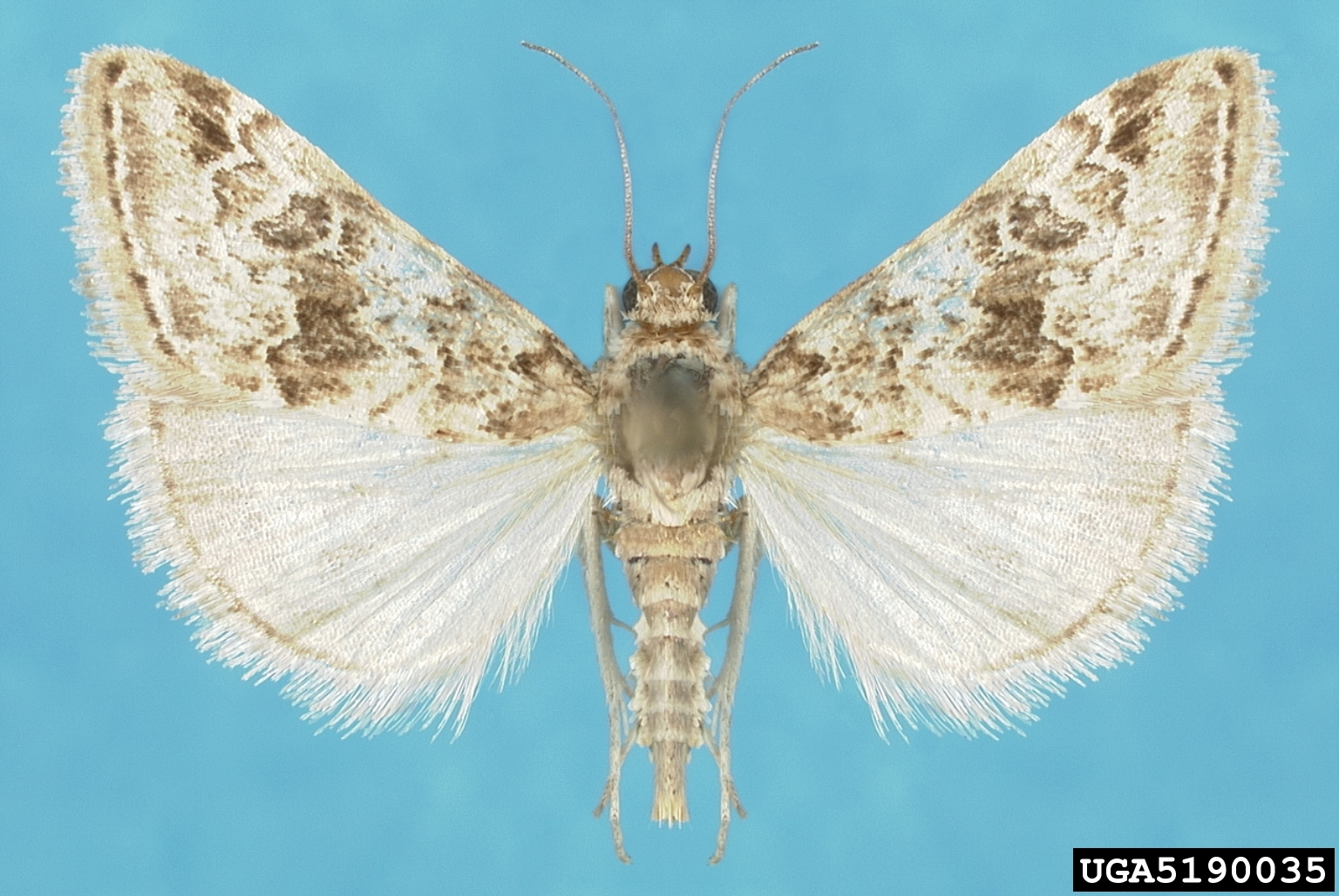
- Adult
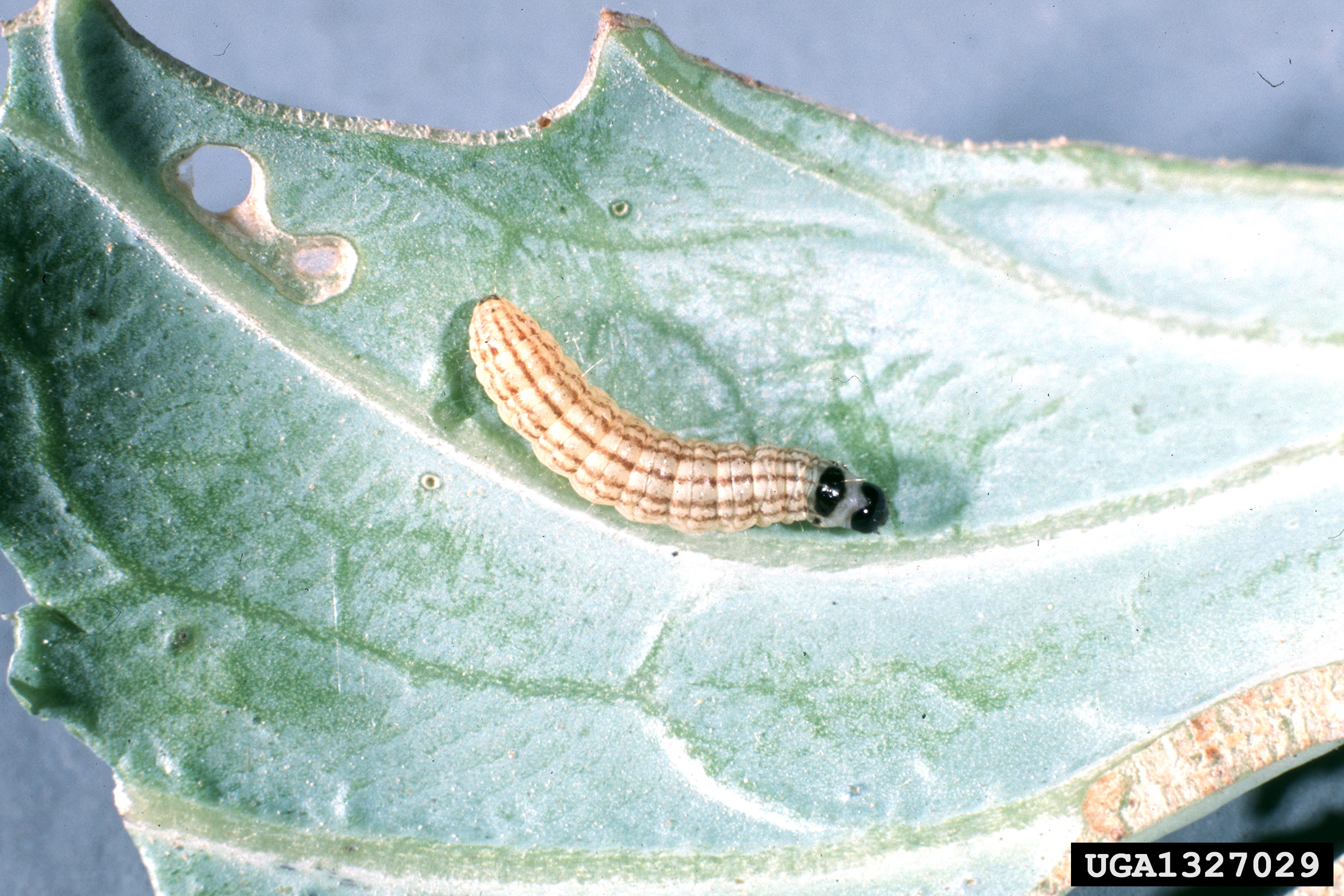
- Larva

Scientific classification
- Domain: Eukaryota
- Kingdom: Animalia
- Phylum: Arthropoda
- Class: Insecta
- Order: Lepidoptera
- Family: Crambidae
- Genus: Hellula
- Species: H. rogatalis

Binomial name
- Hellula rogatalis (Hulst, 1886)

Synonyms
- Botis rogatalis Hulst, 1886

= Hellula rogatalis =

Species of moth

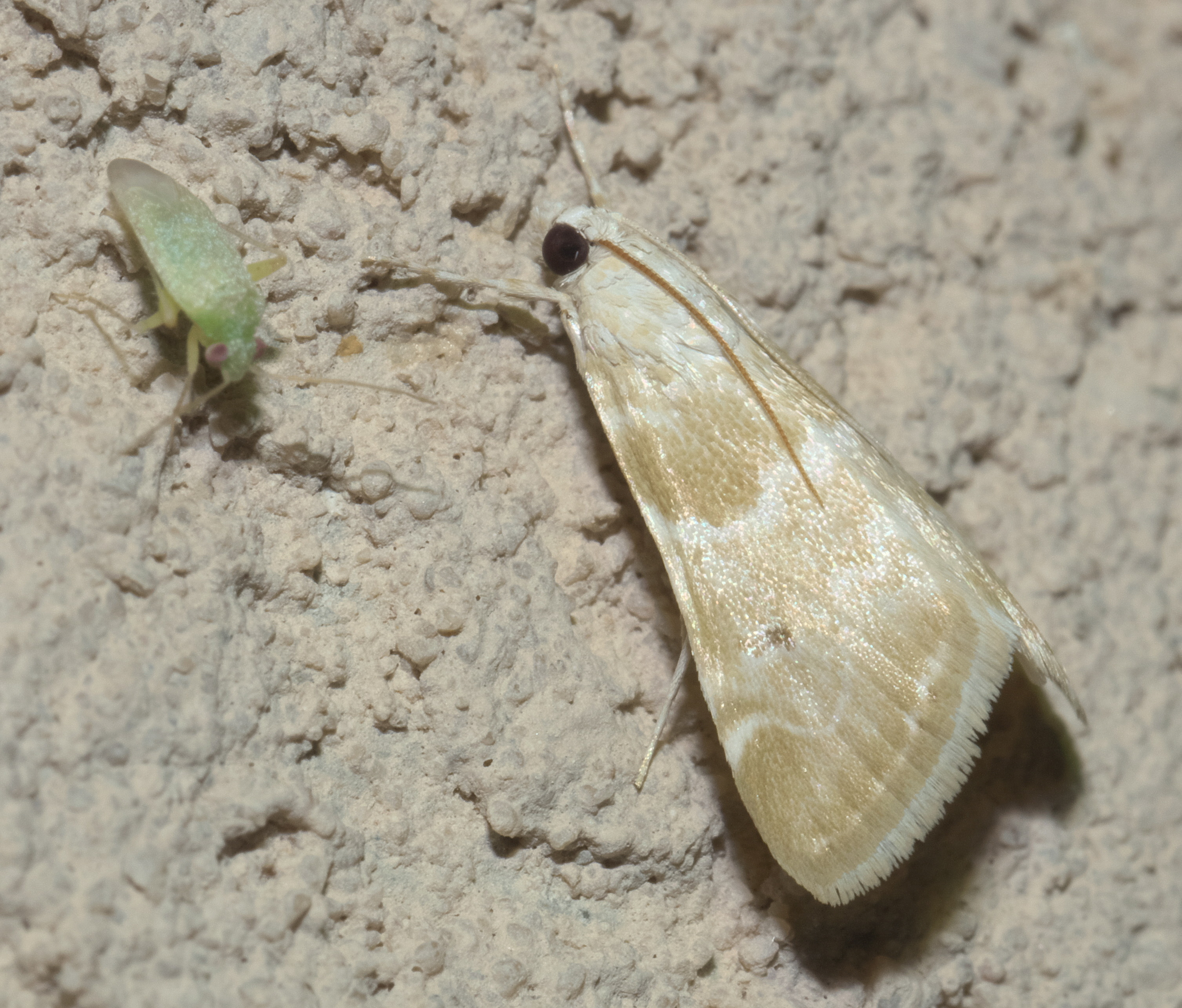

Hellula rogatalis, the cabbage webworm, is a moth of the family Crambidae described by George Duryea Hulst in 1886. It is found from the southern United States north in the east to Maryland, New York and Ontario. It is also found in Mexico, where it has been recorded from Distrito Federal.

The wingspan is 15–21 mm. The forewings are brownish yellow or grayish yellow with wavy white antemedial median, and postmedial lines. The subterminal line consists of several equally spaced black dots. The hindwings are light gray or grayish yellow with a dark terminal line and pale fringe. Adults are on wing from late March to October in the south and from June to October in the north. There are several generations per year in the south.

The larvae feed on a wide range of Brassicaceae and related species, including cabbage, turnip, beet, collard, cauliflower, kale, rutabaga, radish, kohlrabi, mustard, rape, horseradish, shepherd's purse and purslane. They feed on the leaf buds and young leaves of their host plant. They create a silken web.
