= Macreupoca penai =

Scientific classification
- Kingdom: Animalia
- Phylum: Arthropoda
- Class: Insecta
- Order: Lepidoptera
- Family: Crambidae
- Genus: Macreupoca
- Species: M. penai

Binomial name
- Macreupoca penai Munroe, 1964

Species of moth

Macreupoca penai is a moth in the family Crambidae. It was described by Eugene G. Munroe in 1964. It is found in Chile.
