= Parambia paigniodesalis =

Scientific classification
- Kingdom: Animalia
- Phylum: Arthropoda
- Class: Insecta
- Order: Lepidoptera
- Family: Crambidae
- Genus: Parambia
- Species: P. paigniodesalis

Binomial name
- Parambia paigniodesalis (Dyar, 1914)

Synonyms
- Ambia paigniodesalis Dyar, 1914

Species of moth

Parambia paigniodesalis is a moth in the family Crambidae. It is found in Panama.
