= Pseudoligostigma enareralis =

Scientific classification
- Kingdom: Animalia
- Phylum: Arthropoda
- Class: Insecta
- Order: Lepidoptera
- Family: Crambidae
- Genus: Pseudoligostigma
- Species: P. enareralis

Binomial name
- Pseudoligostigma enareralis (Dyar, 1914)

Synonyms
- Ambia enareralis Dyar, 1914

Species of moth

Pseudoligostigma enareralis is a moth in the family Crambidae described by Harrison Gray Dyar Jr. in 1914. It is found from Costa Rica to central Panama.
