= Aethiophysa dichordalis =

Scientific classification
- Kingdom: Animalia
- Phylum: Arthropoda
- Clade: Pancrustacea
- Class: Insecta
- Order: Lepidoptera
- Family: Crambidae
- Genus: Aethiophysa
- Species: A. dichordalis

Binomial name
- Aethiophysa dichordalis (Hampson, 1912)

Synonyms
- Homophysa dichordalis Hampson, 1912

Species of moth

Aethiophysa dichordalis is a moth in the family Crambidae. It was described by George Hampson in 1912. It is found in Suriname.
