= Aureopteryx infuscatalis =

Scientific classification
- Kingdom: Animalia
- Phylum: Arthropoda
- Class: Insecta
- Order: Lepidoptera
- Family: Crambidae
- Genus: Aureopteryx
- Species: A. infuscatalis

Binomial name
- Aureopteryx infuscatalis Munroe, 1964

Species of insect

Aureopteryx infuscatalis is a moth in the family Crambidae. It is found in Bolivia.
