= Chilomima =

Scientific classification
- Kingdom: Animalia
- Phylum: Arthropoda
- Class: Insecta
- Order: Lepidoptera
- Family: Crambidae
- Subfamily: Glaphyriinae
- Genus: Chilomima; Munroe, 1964
- Species: C. clarkei

Binomial name
- Chilomima clarkei (Amsel, 1956)

Synonyms
- Pyrausta clarkei Amsel, 1956

Genus of moths

Chilomima is a genus of moths of the family Crambidae. It contains only one species, Chilomima clarkei, which is found in Colombia, Paraguay and Venezuela.
