= Dichogama jessicales =

Scientific classification
- Domain: Eukaryota
- Kingdom: Animalia
- Phylum: Arthropoda
- Class: Insecta
- Order: Lepidoptera
- Family: Crambidae
- Genus: Dichogama
- Species: D. jessicales

Binomial name
- Dichogama jessicales Schaus, 1940

Species of moth

Dichogama jessicales is a moth in the family Crambidae. It was described by William Schaus in 1940. It is found in Puerto Rico.
