= Pseudoligostigma argyractalis =

Scientific classification
- Kingdom: Animalia
- Phylum: Arthropoda
- Class: Insecta
- Order: Lepidoptera
- Family: Crambidae
- Genus: Pseudoligostigma
- Species: P. argyractalis

Binomial name
- Pseudoligostigma argyractalis (Schaus, 1912)

Synonyms
- Ambia argyractalis Schaus, 1912

Species of moth

Pseudoligostigma argyractalis is a moth in the family Crambidae described by William Schaus in 1912. It is found from western Guatemala to central Costa Rica.
