= Plumegesta =

Scientific classification
- Kingdom: Animalia
- Phylum: Arthropoda
- Class: Insecta
- Order: Lepidoptera
- Family: Crambidae
- Subfamily: Glaphyriinae
- Genus: Plumegesta; Munroe, 1972

Genus of moths

Plumegesta is a genus of moths of the family Crambidae.

== Species ==
- Plumegesta callidalis
- Plumegesta largalis Munroe, 1972
