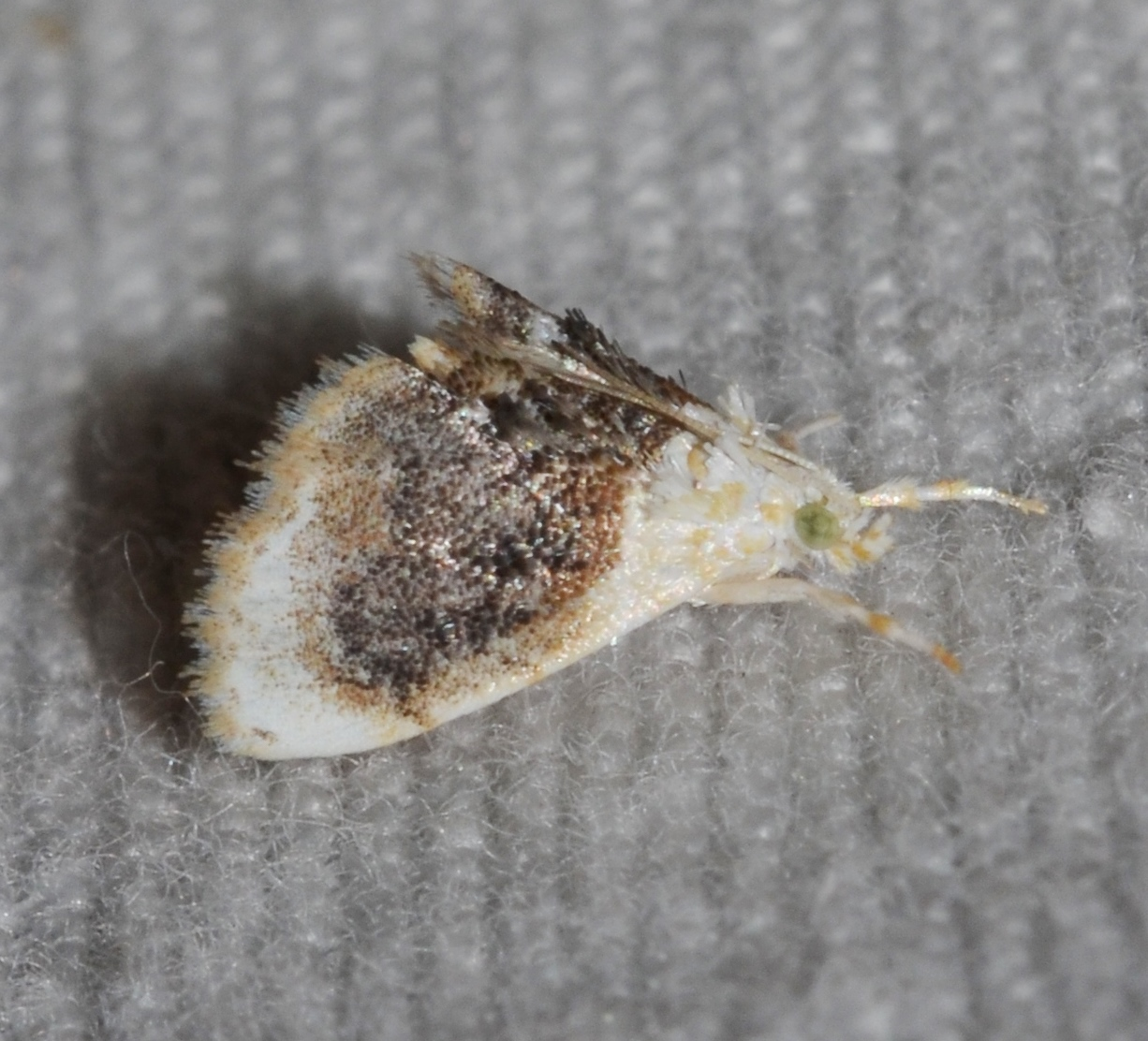

Scientific classification
- Kingdom: Animalia
- Phylum: Arthropoda
- Class: Insecta
- Order: Lepidoptera
- Family: Crambidae
- Subfamily: Glaphyriinae
- Genus: Lipocosmodes; Munroe, 1964
- Species: L. fuliginosalis

Binomial name
- Lipocosmodes fuliginosalis (Fernald, 1888)

Synonyms
- Lipocosma fuliginosalis Fernald, 1888

= Lipocosmodes =

Genus of moths

Lipocosmodes is a genus of moths of the family Crambidae. It contains only one species, Lipocosmodes fuliginosalis, which is found in North America, where it has been recorded from Quebec to Florida and from Illinois to Texas.

The wingspan is 13–15 mm. Adults are on wing from January to November.
