= Pseudoligostigma =

Scientific classification
- Kingdom: Animalia
- Phylum: Arthropoda
- Class: Insecta
- Order: Lepidoptera
- Family: Crambidae
- Subfamily: Glaphyriinae
- Genus: Pseudoligostigma; Strand, 1920

Synonyms
- Heptalitha Munroe, 1964

Genus of moths

Pseudoligostigma is a genus of moths of the family Crambidae.

== Species ==
- Pseudoligostigma argyractalis
- Pseudoligostigma boliviensis Munroe, 1964
- Pseudoligostigma enalassalis
- Pseudoligostigma enantialis
- Pseudoligostigma enareralis
- Pseudoligostigma heptopalis
- Pseudoligostigma incisa Strand, 1920
- Pseudoligostigma odulphalis (Schaus, 1924)
- Pseudoligostigma phaeomeralis
- Pseudoligostigma punctissimalis
