= Vinculopsis scybalistia =

Scientific classification
- Kingdom: Animalia
- Phylum: Arthropoda
- Class: Insecta
- Order: Lepidoptera
- Family: Crambidae
- Genus: Vinculopsis
- Species: V. scybalistia

Binomial name
- Vinculopsis scybalistia (Hampson, 1899)

Synonyms
- Lygropia scybalistia Hampson, 1899; Vincularia venezuelensis Amsel, 1956

Species of moth

Vinculopsis scybalistia is a moth in the family Crambidae. It was described by George Hampson in 1899. It is found in Peru and Venezuela.
