= Dichogama =

Scientific classification
- Kingdom: Animalia
- Phylum: Arthropoda
- Clade: Pancrustacea
- Class: Insecta
- Order: Lepidoptera
- Family: Crambidae
- Subfamily: Glaphyriinae
- Genus: Dichogama; Lederer, 1863

Synonyms
- Carbaca Walker, 1866; Pleurasympieza Möschler, 1890

Genus of moths

Dichogama is a genus of moths of the family Crambidae.

== Species ==
- Dichogama amabilis
- Dichogama colotha
- Dichogama decoralis (Walker, [1866])
- Dichogama diffusalis Hampson, 1918
- Dichogama fernaldi
- Dichogama gudmanni
- Dichogama innocua (Fabricius, 1793)
- Dichogama jessicales Schaus, 1940
- Dichogama obsolescens Hampson, 1912
- Dichogama prognealis (Druce, 1895)
- Dichogama redtenbacheri Lederer, 1863
