= Aethiophysa surinamensis =

Scientific classification
- Kingdom: Animalia
- Phylum: Arthropoda
- Clade: Pancrustacea
- Class: Insecta
- Order: Lepidoptera
- Family: Crambidae
- Genus: Aethiophysa
- Species: A. surinamensis

Binomial name
- Aethiophysa surinamensis Munroe, 1964

Species of moth

Aethiophysa surinamensis is a moth in the family Crambidae. It is found in Suriname.
