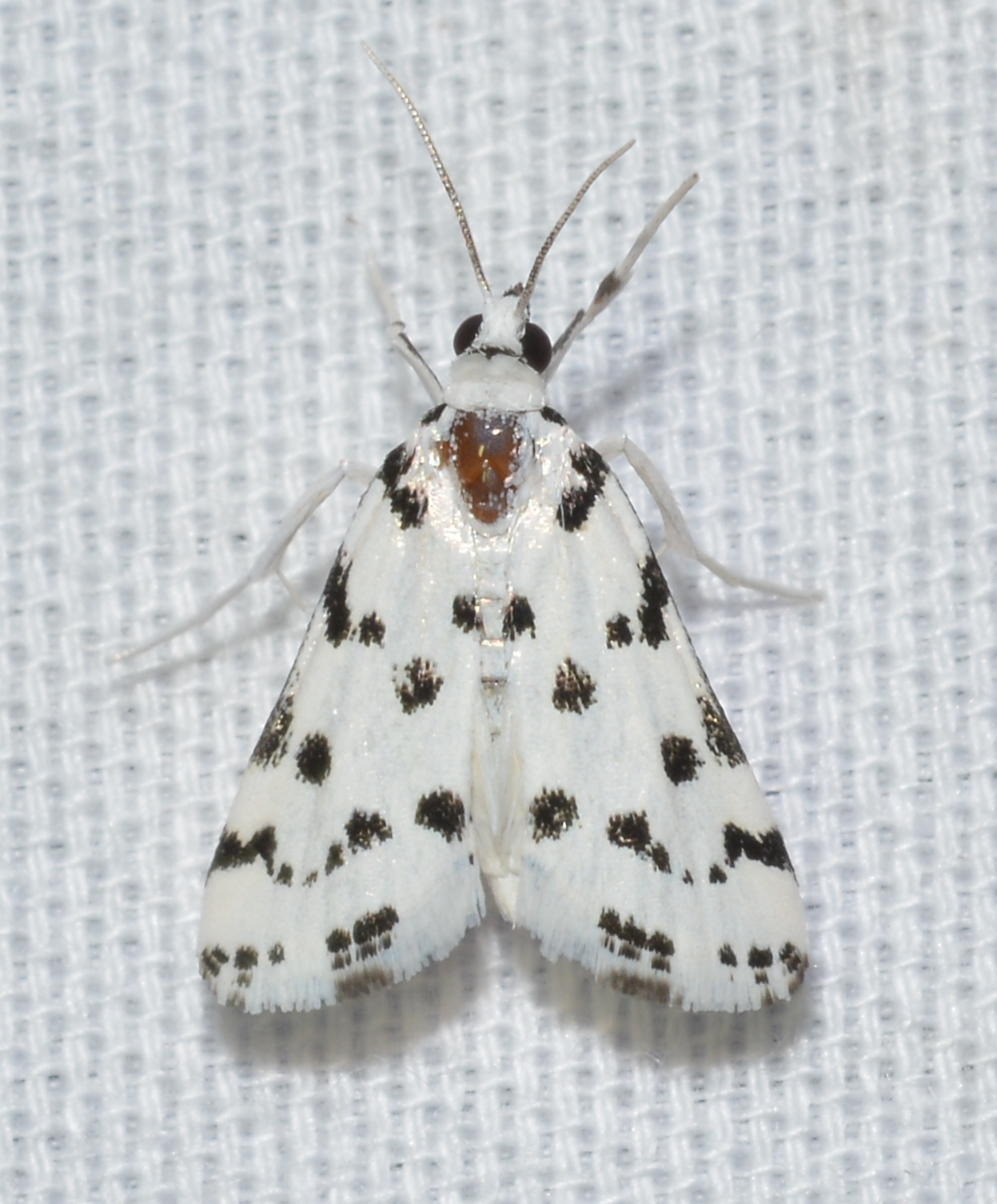

Scientific classification
- Kingdom: Animalia
- Phylum: Arthropoda
- Class: Insecta
- Order: Lepidoptera
- Family: Crambidae
- Subfamily: Glaphyriinae
- Genus: Eustixia; Hübner, 1823
- Species: E. pupula

Binomial name
- Eustixia pupula Hübner, 1823

Synonyms
- Thelcteria Lederer, 1863

= Eustixia =

Genus of moths

Eustixia is a monotypic moth genus of the family Crambidae described by Jacob Hübner in 1823. Its only species, Eustixia pupula, the spotted peppergrass moth, described by the same author in the same publication, is found in North America from Massachusetts to Florida, west to Texas and north to Ontario.

The wingspan is about 17 mm. Adults are on wing from June to August.

The larvae feed on the leaves of Lepidium species, Thlaspi arvense and cabbage.
