= Paregesta =

Scientific classification
- Kingdom: Animalia
- Phylum: Arthropoda
- Class: Insecta
- Order: Lepidoptera
- Family: Crambidae
- Subfamily: Glaphyriinae
- Genus: Paregesta; Munroe, 1964
- Species: P. californiensis

Binomial name
- Paregesta californiensis Munroe, 1964

Genus of moths

Paregesta is a genus of moths of the family Crambidae. It contains only one species, Paregesta californiensis, which is found in North America, where it has been recorded from California.
