= Lativalva monotona =

Scientific classification
- Kingdom: Animalia
- Phylum: Arthropoda
- Class: Insecta
- Order: Lepidoptera
- Family: Crambidae
- Genus: Lativalva
- Species: L. monotona

Binomial name
- Lativalva monotona Amsel, 1956

Species of moth

Lativalva monotona is a moth in the family Crambidae. It was described by Hans Georg Amsel in 1956. It is found in Venezuela.
