= Psephis myrmidonalis =

Scientific classification
- Kingdom: Animalia
- Phylum: Arthropoda
- Class: Insecta
- Order: Lepidoptera
- Family: Crambidae
- Genus: Psephis
- Species: P. myrmidonalis

Binomial name
- Psephis myrmidonalis Guenée, 1854

Synonyms
- Scybalista trifunalis Lederer, 1863

Species of moth

Psephis myrmidonalis is a moth in the family Crambidae. It was described by Achille Guenée in 1854. It is found in Brazil.

== See also ==
- Psephis
