= Contortipalpia masculina =

Scientific classification
- Kingdom: Animalia
- Phylum: Arthropoda
- Class: Insecta
- Order: Lepidoptera
- Family: Crambidae
- Genus: Contortipalpia
- Species: C. masculina

Binomial name
- Contortipalpia masculina Munroe, 1964

Species of moth

Contortipalpia masculina is a moth in the family Crambidae. It was described by Eugene G. Munroe in 1964. It is found in Brazil.
