= Psephis ministralis =

Scientific classification
- Kingdom: Animalia
- Phylum: Arthropoda
- Class: Insecta
- Order: Lepidoptera
- Family: Crambidae
- Genus: Psephis
- Species: P. ministralis

Binomial name
- Psephis ministralis Dyar, 1914

Species of moth

Psephis ministralis is a moth in the family Crambidae. It is found in Panama.
