= Scybalista =

Scientific classification
- Kingdom: Animalia
- Phylum: Arthropoda
- Clade: Pancrustacea
- Class: Insecta
- Order: Lepidoptera
- Family: Crambidae
- Subfamily: Glaphyriinae
- Genus: Scybalista; Lederer, 1863

Genus of moths

Scybalista is a genus of moths of the family Crambidae.

== Species ==
- Scybalista byzesalis (Walker, 1859)
- Scybalista restionalis Lederer, 1863
