= Macreupoca =

Scientific classification
- Kingdom: Animalia
- Phylum: Arthropoda
- Class: Insecta
- Order: Lepidoptera
- Family: Crambidae
- Subfamily: Glaphyriinae
- Genus: Macreupoca; Munroe, 1964

Genus of moths

Macreupoca is a genus of moths of the family Crambidae.

== Species ==
- Macreupoca penai Munroe, 1964
- Macreupoca spectralis
