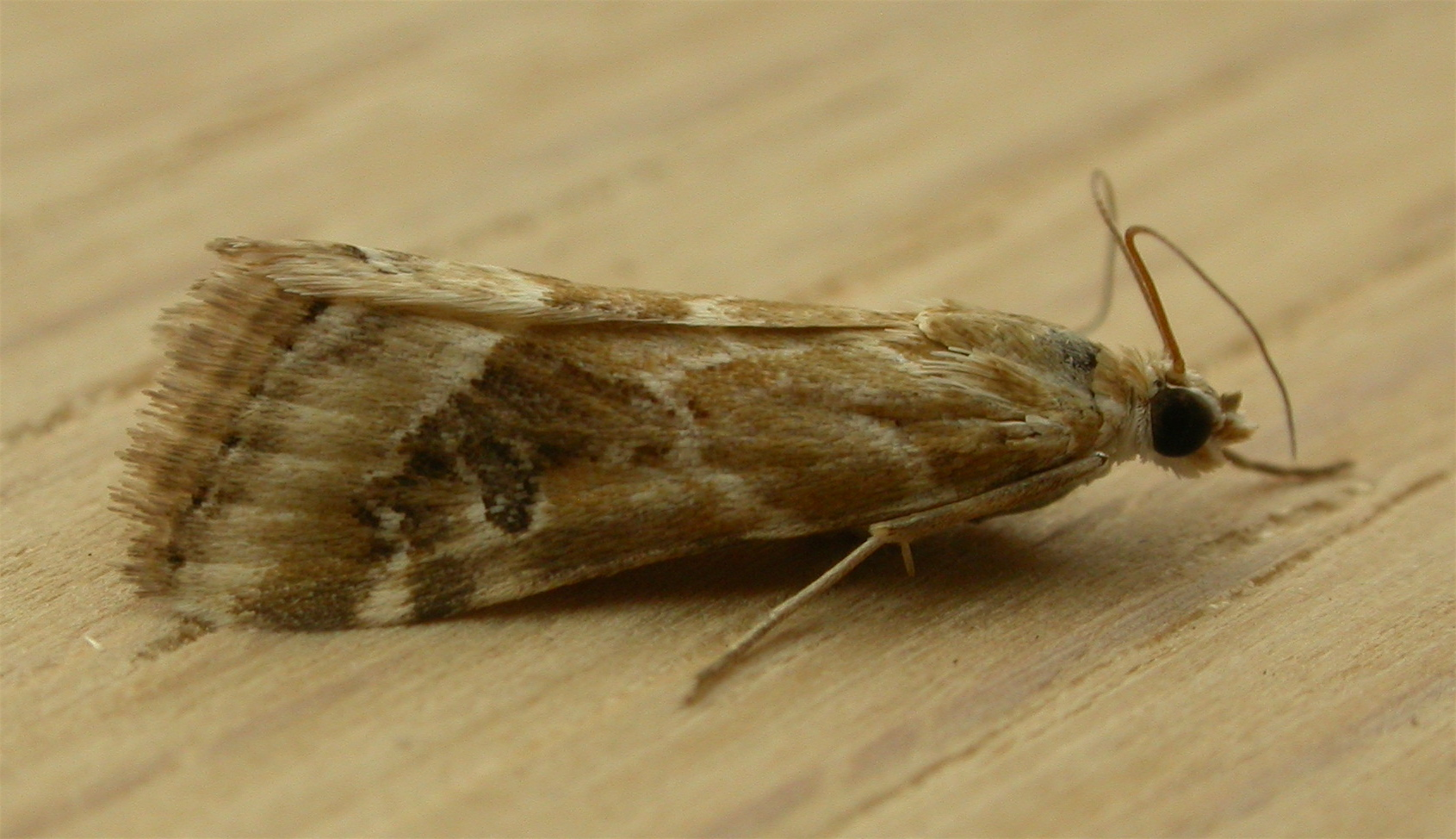
- Hellula hydralis

Scientific classification
- Kingdom: Animalia
- Phylum: Arthropoda
- Class: Insecta
- Order: Lepidoptera
- Family: Crambidae
- Subfamily: Glaphyriinae
- Genus: Hellula; Guenée, 1854

Synonyms
- Ashwania Pajni & Rose, 1977; Oeobia Hübner, 1825; Oebia Hübner, 1825; Phyratocosma Meyrick, 1936

= Hellula =

Genus of moths

Hellula is a genus of moths of the family Crambidae. It was described by Achille Guenée in 1854

== Species ==
Data from:

- Hellula aqualis Barnes & McDunnough, 1914
- Hellula caecigena (Meyrick, 1933)
- Hellula galapagensis Landry & Roque-Albelo, 2008
- Hellula hydralis Guenée, 1854 – cabbage centre grub
- Hellula kempae Munroe, 1972
- Hellula phidilealis (Walker, 1859) – cabbage budworm moth
- Hellula rogatalis (Hulst, 1886)
- Hellula simplicalis Herrich-Schäffer, 1871
- Hellula subbasalis (Dyar, 1923)
- Hellula undalis (Fabricius, 1794) – cabbage webworm, Old World webworm
- †Oeobia sp. nov. (extinct)
