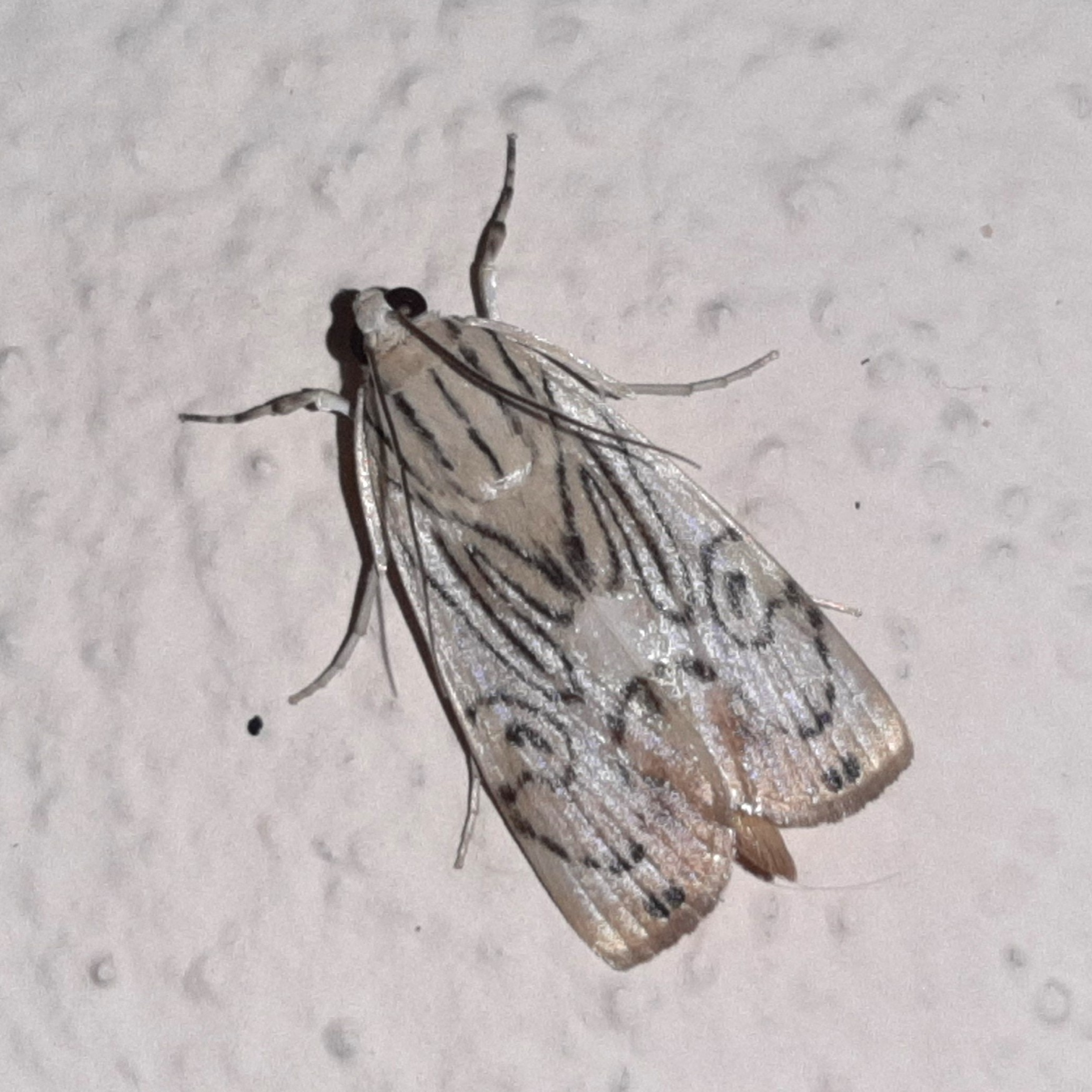

Scientific classification
- Domain: Eukaryota
- Kingdom: Animalia
- Phylum: Arthropoda
- Class: Insecta
- Order: Lepidoptera
- Family: Crambidae
- Genus: Dichogama
- Species: D. redtenbacheri

Binomial name
- Dichogama redtenbacheri Lederer, 1863

= Dichogama redtenbacheri =

Species of moth

Dichogama redtenbacheri, the caper-leaf webworm moth, is a species of moth in the family Crambidae. It was first described by Julius Lederer in 1863. It is found in the southern United States (Florida), the West Indies, Costa Rica and South America.

The wingspan is about 28 mm. Adults have been recorded on wing year round.

The larvae feed on Capparis species, including Capparis cynophallophora.
