= Aethiophysa extorris =

Scientific classification
- Kingdom: Animalia
- Phylum: Arthropoda
- Clade: Pancrustacea
- Class: Insecta
- Order: Lepidoptera
- Family: Crambidae
- Genus: Aethiophysa
- Species: A. extorris

Binomial name
- Aethiophysa extorris (Warren, 1892)

Synonyms
- Cybolomia extorris Warren, 1892; Metasia quadristrigalis Fernald, 1894

Species of moth

Aethiophysa extorris is a moth in the family Crambidae. It was described by Warren in 1892. It is found in North America, where it has been recorded from Colorado, California, Texas, Arizona, Utah and Nevada.
