= Aureopteryx =

Scientific classification
- Kingdom: Animalia
- Phylum: Arthropoda
- Class: Insecta
- Order: Lepidoptera
- Family: Crambidae
- Subfamily: Glaphyriinae
- Genus: Aureopteryx; Amsel, 1956

Genus of moths

Aureopteryx is a genus of moths of the family Crambidae.

== Species ==
- Aureopteryx argentistriata
- Aureopteryx calistoalis (Walker, 1859)
- Aureopteryx glorialis (Schaus, 1920)
- Aureopteryx infuscatalis
- Aureopteryx olufsoni Solis & Adamski, 1998
