= Lativalva =

Scientific classification
- Kingdom: Animalia
- Phylum: Arthropoda
- Class: Insecta
- Order: Lepidoptera
- Family: Crambidae
- Subfamily: Glaphyriinae
- Genus: Lativalva; Amsel, 1956

Genus of moths

Lativalva is a genus of moths of the family Crambidae.

== Species ==
- Lativalva monotona Amsel, 1956
- Lativalva pseudosmithii Amsel, 1956
