= Pseudoligostigma incisa =

Scientific classification
- Kingdom: Animalia
- Phylum: Arthropoda
- Class: Insecta
- Order: Lepidoptera
- Family: Crambidae
- Genus: Pseudoligostigma
- Species: P. incisa

Binomial name
- Pseudoligostigma incisa Strand, 1920

Species of moth

Pseudoligostigma incisa is a moth in the family Crambidae. It was described by Strand in 1920. It is found in Trinidad.
