= Vinculopsis =

Scientific classification
- Kingdom: Animalia
- Phylum: Arthropoda
- Class: Insecta
- Order: Lepidoptera
- Family: Crambidae
- Subfamily: Glaphyriinae
- Genus: Vinculopsis; Amsel, 1957

Synonyms
- Vincularia Amsel, 1956

Genus of moths

Vinculopsis is a genus of moths of the family Crambidae.

== Species ==
- Vinculopsis epipaschia
- Vinculopsis scybalistia (Hampson, 1899)
