= Xanthophysa =

Scientific classification
- Kingdom: Animalia
- Phylum: Arthropoda
- Clade: Pancrustacea
- Class: Insecta
- Order: Lepidoptera
- Family: Crambidae
- Subfamily: Glaphyriinae
- Genus: Xanthophysa; Munroe, 1964
- Species: X. psychialis

Binomial name
- Xanthophysa psychialis (Hulst, 1886)

Synonyms
- Botis psychialis Hulst, 1886

Genus of moths

Xanthophysa is a monotypic genus of moth in the family Crambidae described by Eugene G. Munroe in 1964. It contains only one species, Xanthophysa psychialis, the xanthophysa moth, described by George Duryea Hulst in 1886. It is found in North America, where it has been recorded from Alabama, Florida, Illinois, Indiana, Kentucky, Maine, Mississippi, New Hampshire, New Jersey, North Carolina, Ohio, Ontario, Quebec, South Carolina and Tennessee.

The length of the forewings is 6–7 mm. Adults are on wing from March to October.
