= Hellula galapagensis =

Scientific classification
- Domain: Eukaryota
- Kingdom: Animalia
- Phylum: Arthropoda
- Class: Insecta
- Order: Lepidoptera
- Family: Crambidae
- Genus: Hellula
- Species: H. galapagensis

Binomial name
- Hellula galapagensis Landry & Roque-Albelo, 2008

Species of moth

Hellula galapagensis is a moth in the family Crambidae. It was described by Bernard Landry and Lazaro Roque-Albelo in 2008. It is found on the Galápagos Islands.
