= Scybalistodes prusalis =

Scientific classification
- Kingdom: Animalia
- Phylum: Arthropoda
- Class: Insecta
- Order: Lepidoptera
- Family: Crambidae
- Genus: Scybalistodes
- Species: S. prusalis

Binomial name
- Scybalistodes prusalis (H. Druce, 1895)

Synonyms
- Phlyctaenia prusalis H. Druce, 1895

Species of moth

Scybalistodes prusalis is a moth in the family Crambidae. It was described by Herbert Druce in 1895. It is found in Guerrero, Mexico.
