= Cereophagus =

Scientific classification
- Kingdom: Animalia
- Phylum: Arthropoda
- Class: Insecta
- Order: Lepidoptera
- Family: Crambidae
- Subfamily: Glaphyriinae
- Genus: Cereophagus; Dyar, 1922
- Species: C. futilalis

Binomial name
- Cereophagus futilalis Dyar, 1922

Genus of moths

Cereophagus is a genus of moths of the family Crambidae. It contains only one species, Cereophagus futilalis, which is found in Argentina.
