= Scybalista byzesalis =

Scientific classification
- Kingdom: Animalia
- Phylum: Arthropoda
- Class: Insecta
- Order: Lepidoptera
- Family: Crambidae
- Genus: Scybalista
- Species: S. byzesalis

Binomial name
- Scybalista byzesalis (Walker, 1859)

Synonyms
- Pyralis byzesalis Walker, 1859

Species of moth

Scybalista byzesalis is a moth in the family Crambidae. It was described by Francis Walker in 1859. It is found in Rio de Janeiro, Brazil.
