= Macreupoca spectralis =

Scientific classification
- Kingdom: Animalia
- Phylum: Arthropoda
- Class: Insecta
- Order: Lepidoptera
- Family: Crambidae
- Genus: Macreupoca
- Species: M. spectralis

Binomial name
- Macreupoca spectralis Munroe, 1964

Species of moth

Macreupoca spectralis is a moth in the family Crambidae. It is found in Chile.
