= Dichochroma =

Scientific classification
- Kingdom: Animalia
- Phylum: Arthropoda
- Clade: Pancrustacea
- Class: Insecta
- Order: Lepidoptera
- Family: Crambidae
- Subfamily: Glaphyriinae
- Genus: Dichochroma; Forbes, 1944
- Species: D. muralis

Binomial name
- Dichochroma muralis Forbes, 1944

Genus of moths

Dichochroma is a monotypic moth genus of the family Crambidae described by William Trowbridge Merrifield Forbes in 1944. It contains only one species, Dichochroma muralis, described by the same author in the same year, which is found in Peru.
