= Pseudoligostigma enalassalis =

Scientific classification
- Kingdom: Animalia
- Phylum: Arthropoda
- Class: Insecta
- Order: Lepidoptera
- Family: Crambidae
- Genus: Pseudoligostigma
- Species: P. enalassalis

Binomial name
- Pseudoligostigma enalassalis (Dyar, 1914)

Synonyms
- Ambia enalassalis Dyar, 1914; Pseudoligostigma enalassalis Munroe, 1995

Species of moth

Pseudoligostigma enalassalis is a moth in the family Crambidae. It is found in Panama.
