= Eupoca haakei =

Scientific classification
- Kingdom: Animalia
- Phylum: Arthropoda
- Clade: Pancrustacea
- Class: Insecta
- Order: Lepidoptera
- Family: Crambidae
- Genus: Eupoca
- Species: E. haakei

Binomial name
- Eupoca haakei Solis & Adamski, 1998

Species of moth

Eupoca haakei is a moth in the family Crambidae. It was described by Maria Alma Solis and David Adamski in 1998. It is found at low elevations in south-eastern Costa Rica.
