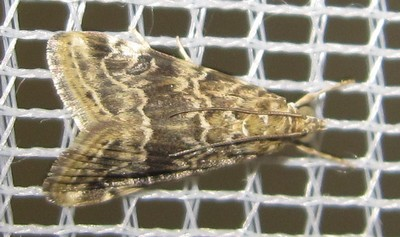

Scientific classification
- Domain: Eukaryota
- Kingdom: Animalia
- Phylum: Arthropoda
- Class: Insecta
- Order: Lepidoptera
- Family: Crambidae
- Genus: Hellula
- Species: H. undalis

Binomial name
- Hellula undalis (Fabricius, 1794)

Synonyms
- Phalaena undalis Fabricius, 1794; Pionea geyri Rothschild, 1915; Pyralis lunulalis Costa, 1836; Scoparia alconalis Walker, 1859; Leucinodes exemptalis Walker, 1866; Evergestis occidentalis de Joannis, 1930; Ashwania reniculus Pajni & Rose, 1977; Hellula undulalis Hübner, 1825; Crypsotidia parva Rothschild, 1921

= Hellula undalis =

Species of moth

Hellula undalis, the cabbage webworm or Old World webworm, is a moth of the family Crambidae. It is a widespread species which is found from Europe across Asia to the Pacific. It was first described from Italy but it is a tropical or subtropical species only occasional in Europe.

The wingspan is about 18 mm. The forewings are greyish-brown with wavy grey markings, a curved pale subterminal patch and a kidney shaped mark at one third. The hindwings are pale, with the tip lighter.

It is a pest of Brassica oleracea (cabbage) and Brassica rapa (turnip)
