= Hellula aqualis =

Scientific classification
- Domain: Eukaryota
- Kingdom: Animalia
- Phylum: Arthropoda
- Class: Insecta
- Order: Lepidoptera
- Family: Crambidae
- Genus: Hellula
- Species: H. aqualis

Binomial name
- Hellula aqualis Barnes & McDunnough, 1914

Species of moth

Hellula aqualis is a moth in the family Crambidae. It was described by William Barnes and James Halliday McDunnough in 1914. It is found in North America, where it has been recorded from Arizona, California, Colorado, Nevada, New Mexico and Texas.

The wingspan is 16 mm. The forewings are pale ocherous, shaded with olivaceous. The hindwings are semihyaline white with a faint smoky terminal border.
