= Alatuncusia bergii =

Scientific classification
- Kingdom: Animalia
- Phylum: Arthropoda
- Clade: Pancrustacea
- Class: Insecta
- Order: Lepidoptera
- Family: Crambidae
- Genus: Alatuncusia
- Species: A. bergii

Binomial name
- Alatuncusia bergii (Möschler, 1890)

Synonyms
- Dichogama bergii Möschler, 1890

Species of insect

Alatuncusia bergii, or Berg's alatuncusia moth, is a moth in the family Crambidae. It was described by Heinrich Benno Möschler in 1890. It is found in the West Indies (including Puerto Rico, Cuba and Jamaica), from Mexico to Venezuela and in southern Florida.

The wingspan is 22 mm. Adults are on wing from July to December in Florida.

The larvae feed on Capparis cynophallophora.
