= Eupoca micralis =

Scientific classification
- Kingdom: Animalia
- Phylum: Arthropoda
- Class: Insecta
- Order: Lepidoptera
- Family: Crambidae
- Genus: Eupoca
- Species: E. micralis

Binomial name
- Eupoca micralis Munroe, 1964

Species of moth

Eupoca micralis is a moth in the family Crambidae. It is found in Mexico.
