= Homophysodes =

Scientific classification
- Kingdom: Animalia
- Phylum: Arthropoda
- Class: Insecta
- Order: Lepidoptera
- Family: Crambidae
- Subfamily: Glaphyriinae
- Genus: Homophysodes; Dyar, 1914
- Species: H. morbidalis

Binomial name
- Homophysodes morbidalis Dyar, 1914

Genus of moths

Homophysodes is a genus of moths of the family Crambidae. It contains only one species, Homophysodes morbidalis, which is found from Guatemala south to Panama.
