= Plumegesta largalis =

Scientific classification
- Kingdom: Animalia
- Phylum: Arthropoda
- Class: Insecta
- Order: Lepidoptera
- Family: Crambidae
- Genus: Plumegesta
- Species: P. largalis

Binomial name
- Plumegesta largalis Munroe, 1972

Species of moth

Plumegesta largalis is a moth in the family Crambidae. It was described by Eugene G. Munroe in 1972. It is found in North America, where it has been recorded from Florida.

The wingspan is about 13 mm. Adults are on wing in March and from May to July.
