= Eupoca bifascialis =

Scientific classification
- Kingdom: Animalia
- Phylum: Arthropoda
- Class: Insecta
- Order: Lepidoptera
- Family: Crambidae
- Genus: Eupoca
- Species: E. bifascialis

Binomial name
- Eupoca bifascialis (Walker, 1863)

Synonyms
- Nephopteryx bifascialis Walker, 1863; Eupoca cinerea Warren, 1891

Species of moth

Eupoca bifascialis is a moth in the family Crambidae. It is found from southern Mexico to north-central Argentina.
