= Aethiophysa acutipennis =

Scientific classification
- Kingdom: Animalia
- Phylum: Arthropoda
- Clade: Pancrustacea
- Class: Insecta
- Order: Lepidoptera
- Family: Crambidae
- Genus: Aethiophysa
- Species: A. acutipennis

Binomial name
- Aethiophysa acutipennis Munroe, 1964

Species of moth

Aethiophysa acutipennis is a moth in the family Crambidae. It is found in Brazil.
