= Dichogama diffusalis =

Scientific classification
- Kingdom: Animalia
- Phylum: Arthropoda
- Class: Insecta
- Order: Lepidoptera
- Family: Crambidae
- Genus: Dichogama
- Species: D. diffusalis

Binomial name
- Dichogama diffusalis Hampson, 1918

Species of moth

Dichogama diffusalis is a moth in the family Crambidae. It was described by George Hampson in 1918. It is found in Venezuela and Costa Rica.

The wingspan is about 40 mm. The forewings are silvery grey white, faintly irrorated (sprinkled) with reddish-brown scales. There is a broad antemedial dark shade consisting of black-brown scales. The diffused triangular dark patch from the costa to the lower angle of the cell is also formed by black-brown scales, as is the diffused patch at the middle of the inner margin. The postmedial line is blackish and the termen is tinged with brown towards the apex. The hindwings are silvery white, with a terminal series of black spots.
