= Psephis =

Scientific classification
- Kingdom: Animalia
- Phylum: Arthropoda
- Class: Insecta
- Order: Lepidoptera
- Family: Crambidae
- Subfamily: Glaphyriinae
- Genus: Psephis; Guenée, 1854

Genus of moths

Psephis is a genus of moths of the family Crambidae.

== Species ==
- Psephis gomalis Schaus, 1920
- Psephis ministralis
- Psephis myrmidonalis Guenée, 1854
