= Aethiophysa falcatalis =

Scientific classification
- Kingdom: Animalia
- Phylum: Arthropoda
- Clade: Pancrustacea
- Class: Insecta
- Order: Lepidoptera
- Family: Crambidae
- Genus: Aethiophysa
- Species: A. falcatalis

Binomial name
- Aethiophysa falcatalis (Hampson, 1895)

Synonyms
- Glaphyria falcatalis Hampson, 1895

Species of moth

Aethiophysa falcatalis is a moth in the family Crambidae. It is found in the West Indies.
