= Parambia cedroalis =

Scientific classification
- Domain: Eukaryota
- Kingdom: Animalia
- Phylum: Arthropoda
- Class: Insecta
- Order: Lepidoptera
- Family: Crambidae
- Genus: Parambia
- Species: P. cedroalis

Binomial name
- Parambia cedroalis Schaus, 1924

Species of moth

Parambia cedroalis is a moth in the family Crambidae. It is found in Cuba.
