= Dichogama gudmanni =

Scientific classification
- Domain: Eukaryota
- Kingdom: Animalia
- Phylum: Arthropoda
- Class: Insecta
- Order: Lepidoptera
- Family: Crambidae
- Genus: Dichogama
- Species: D. gudmanni

Binomial name
- Dichogama gudmanni Von Hedemann, 1894

Species of moth

Dichogama gudmanni is a moth in the family Crambidae. It is found in Puerto Rico.
