= Dichogama colotha =

Scientific classification
- Domain: Eukaryota
- Kingdom: Animalia
- Phylum: Arthropoda
- Class: Insecta
- Order: Lepidoptera
- Family: Crambidae
- Genus: Dichogama
- Species: D. colotha

Binomial name
- Dichogama colotha Dyar, 1912

Species of moth

Dichogama colotha is a moth in the family Crambidae. It is found in Costa Rica, Mexico and the United States, where it has been recorded from Texas. It is also found in Puerto Rico.

The wingspan is 28–36 mm. The forewings are white, but black from the costa to the outer line. The hindwings are white, with a dark grey terminal shade. Adults are on wing from June to October.
