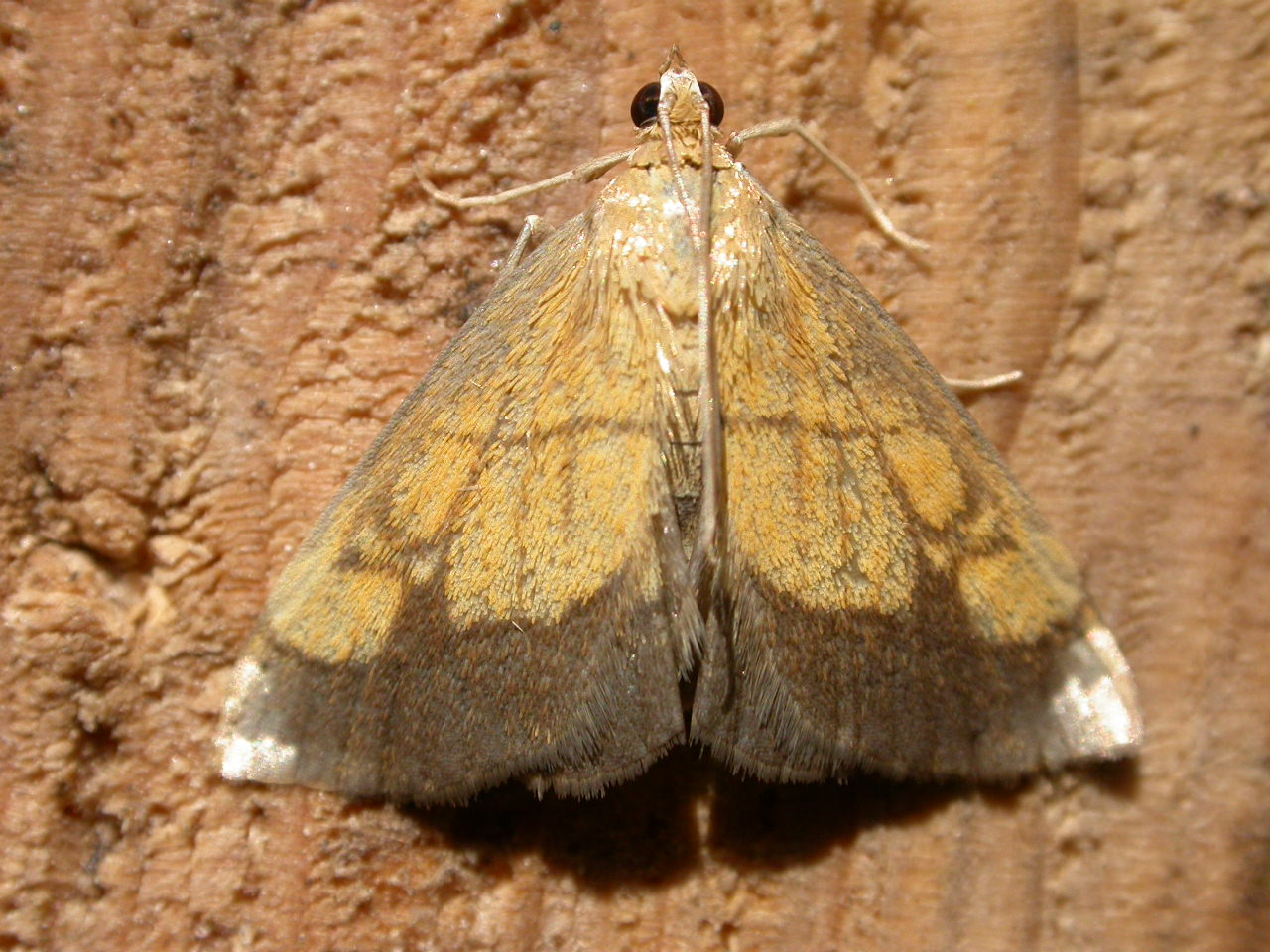
- Evergestis limbata

Scientific classification
- Kingdom: Animalia
- Phylum: Arthropoda
- Clade: Pancrustacea
- Class: Insecta
- Order: Lepidoptera
- Family: Crambidae
- Subfamily: Glaphyriinae; Forbes, 1923

Synonyms
- Cathariinae Minet, 1982; Cybalomiini Marion, 1955; Evergestinae Marion, 1952; Evergestrinae P. Leraut, 2008 (misspelling); Orenaiini P. Leraut, 1997; Homophysidae Lederer, 1863; Noordinae Minet, 1980

= Glaphyriinae =

Subfamily of moths

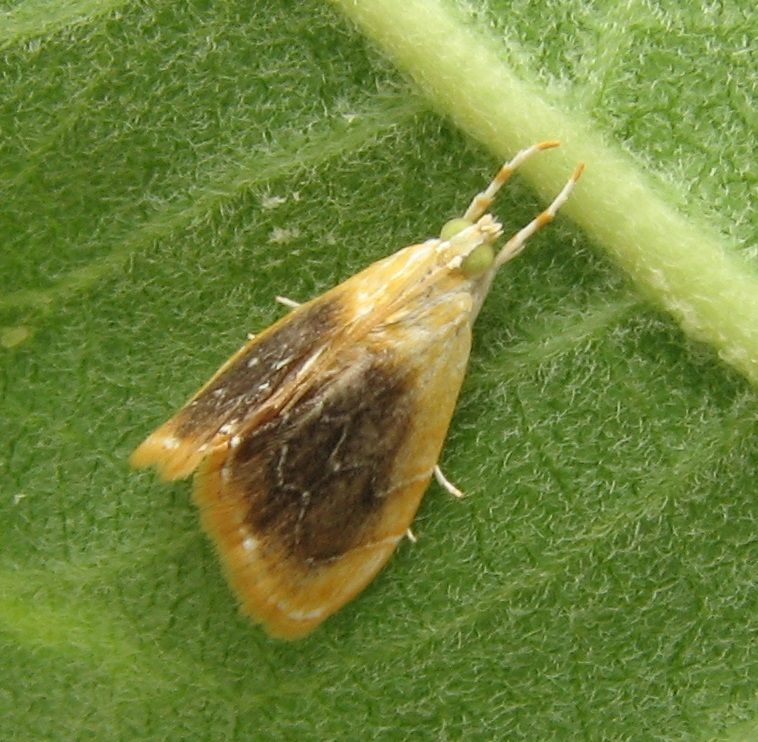
Glaphyria fulminalis on milkweed

Glaphyriinae is a subfamily of the lepidopteran family Crambidae. It was described by William Trowbridge Merrifield Forbes in 1923. The subfamily currently comprises 509 species in 75 genera.

The larvae of Glaphyriinae predominantly feed on plants of the order Brassicales and are able to digest the glucosinolates contained in these plants.

== Genera ==
- Abegesta Munroe, 1964
- Achantodes Guenée, 1852
- Aenigmodes Amsel, 1957 (= Aenigma Amsel, 1956)
- Aethiophysa Munroe, 1964
- Agastya Moore, 1881 (= Agastia Moore, 1881)
- Aureopteryx Amsel, 1956
- Catharia Lederer, 1863
- Cereophagus Dyar, 1922
- Chalcoela Zeller, 1872
- Chilomima Munroe, 1964
- Chilozela Munroe, 1964
- Contortipalpia Munroe, 1964
- Cosmopterosis Amsel, 1956
- Dichochroma Forbes, 1944
- Dicymolomia Zeller, 1872 (= Bifalculina Amsel, 1956)
- Eupoca Warren, 1891
- Eustixia Hübner, 1823 (= Thelcteria Lederer, 1863, Thlecteria Dyar, 1925)
- Evergestis Hübner, 1825
- Gonodiscus Warren, 1891
- Homophysodes Dyar, 1914
- Lativalva Amsel, 1956
- Lipocosma Lederer, 1863 (= Clarkeiodes Amsel, 1957, Clarkeia Amsel, 1956, Lipocosmopsis Munroe, 1964)
- Lipocosmodes Munroe, 1964
- Lissophanes Warren, 1891
- Macreupoca Munroe, 1964
- Nephrogramma Munroe, 1964
- Parambia Dyar, 1914
- Paregesta Munroe, 1964
- Plumegesta Munroe, 1972
- Psephis Guenée, 1854
- Pseudoligostigma Strand, 1920 (= Heptalitha Munroe, 1964)
- Schacontia Dyar, 1914
- Scybalista Lederer, 1863
- Scybalistodes Munroe, 1964
- Stegea Munroe, 1964 (= Egesta Ragonot, 1891)
- Upiga Capps, 1964
- Vinculopsis Amsel, 1957 (= Vincularia Amsel, 1956)
- Xanthophysa Munroe, 1964

Tribe Dichogamini Amsel, 1956

- Alatuncusia Amsel, 1956
- Alatuncusiodes Munroe, 1974
- Dichogama Lederer, 1863 (= Carbaca Walker, 1866)

Tribe Glaphyriini Forbes, 1923

- Glaphyria Hübner, 1823 (= Berdura Möschler, 1886, Glaphria Fernald, 1903, Homophysa Guenée, 1854)
- Hellula Guenée, 1854 (= Ashwania Pajni & Rose, 1977, Oeobia Hübner, 1825, Oebia Hübner, 1825, Phyratocosma Meyrick, 1936)
