= Aethiophysa consimilis =

Scientific classification
- Kingdom: Animalia
- Phylum: Arthropoda
- Clade: Pancrustacea
- Class: Insecta
- Order: Lepidoptera
- Family: Crambidae
- Genus: Aethiophysa
- Species: A. consimilis

Binomial name
- Aethiophysa consimilis Munroe, 1964

Species of moth

Aethiophysa consimilis is a moth in the family Crambidae. It is found in North America, where it has been recorded from Alabama, Maryland, Mississippi, North Carolina, Ohio, South Carolina, Tennessee, Texas and West Virginia.
