= Alatuncusia subductalis =

Scientific classification
- Kingdom: Animalia
- Phylum: Arthropoda
- Clade: Pancrustacea
- Class: Insecta
- Order: Lepidoptera
- Family: Crambidae
- Genus: Alatuncusia
- Species: A. subductalis

Binomial name
- Alatuncusia subductalis (Walker, 1865)

Synonyms
- Scybalista subductalis Walker, 1865

Species of moth

Alatuncusia subductalis is a moth in the family Crambidae. It is found in Venezuela.
