= Lativalva pseudosmithii =

Scientific classification
- Kingdom: Animalia
- Phylum: Arthropoda
- Class: Insecta
- Order: Lepidoptera
- Family: Crambidae
- Genus: Lativalva
- Species: L. pseudosmithii

Binomial name
- Lativalva pseudosmithii Amsel, 1956

Species of moth

Lativalva pseudosmithii is a moth in the family Crambidae. It was described by Hans Georg Amsel in 1956 and is found in Venezuela.
