= Pseudoligostigma heptopalis =

Scientific classification
- Kingdom: Animalia
- Phylum: Arthropoda
- Class: Insecta
- Order: Lepidoptera
- Family: Crambidae
- Genus: Pseudoligostigma
- Species: P. heptopalis

Binomial name
- Pseudoligostigma heptopalis (Hampson, 1908)

Synonyms
- Ambia heptopalis Hampson, 1908

Species of moth

Pseudoligostigma heptopalis is a moth in the family Crambidae. It is found in Brazil.
