= Dichogama amabilis =

Scientific classification
- Domain: Eukaryota
- Kingdom: Animalia
- Phylum: Arthropoda
- Class: Insecta
- Order: Lepidoptera
- Family: Crambidae
- Genus: Dichogama
- Species: D. amabilis

Binomial name
- Dichogama amabilis Möschler, 1889

Species of insect

Dichogama amabilis is a moth in the family Crambidae. It is found in Puerto Rico, Cuba and in southern Florida.
