= Parambia gnomosynalis =

Scientific classification
- Kingdom: Animalia
- Phylum: Arthropoda
- Class: Insecta
- Order: Lepidoptera
- Family: Crambidae
- Genus: Parambia
- Species: P. gnomosynalis

Binomial name
- Parambia gnomosynalis Dyar, 1914

Synonyms
- Parambia glenealis Dyar, 1914

Species of moth

Parambia gnomosynalis is a moth in the family Crambidae. It was described by Harrison Gray Dyar Jr. in 1914. It is found from Guatemala south through Central America to northern South America.
