= Aethiophysa dimotalis =

Scientific classification
- Kingdom: Animalia
- Phylum: Arthropoda
- Clade: Pancrustacea
- Class: Insecta
- Order: Lepidoptera
- Family: Crambidae
- Genus: Aethiophysa
- Species: A. dimotalis

Binomial name
- Aethiophysa dimotalis (Walker, 1865)

Synonyms
- Zebronia dimotalis Walker, 1865

Species of moth

Aethiophysa dimotalis is a moth in the family Crambidae. It is found in Honduras.
