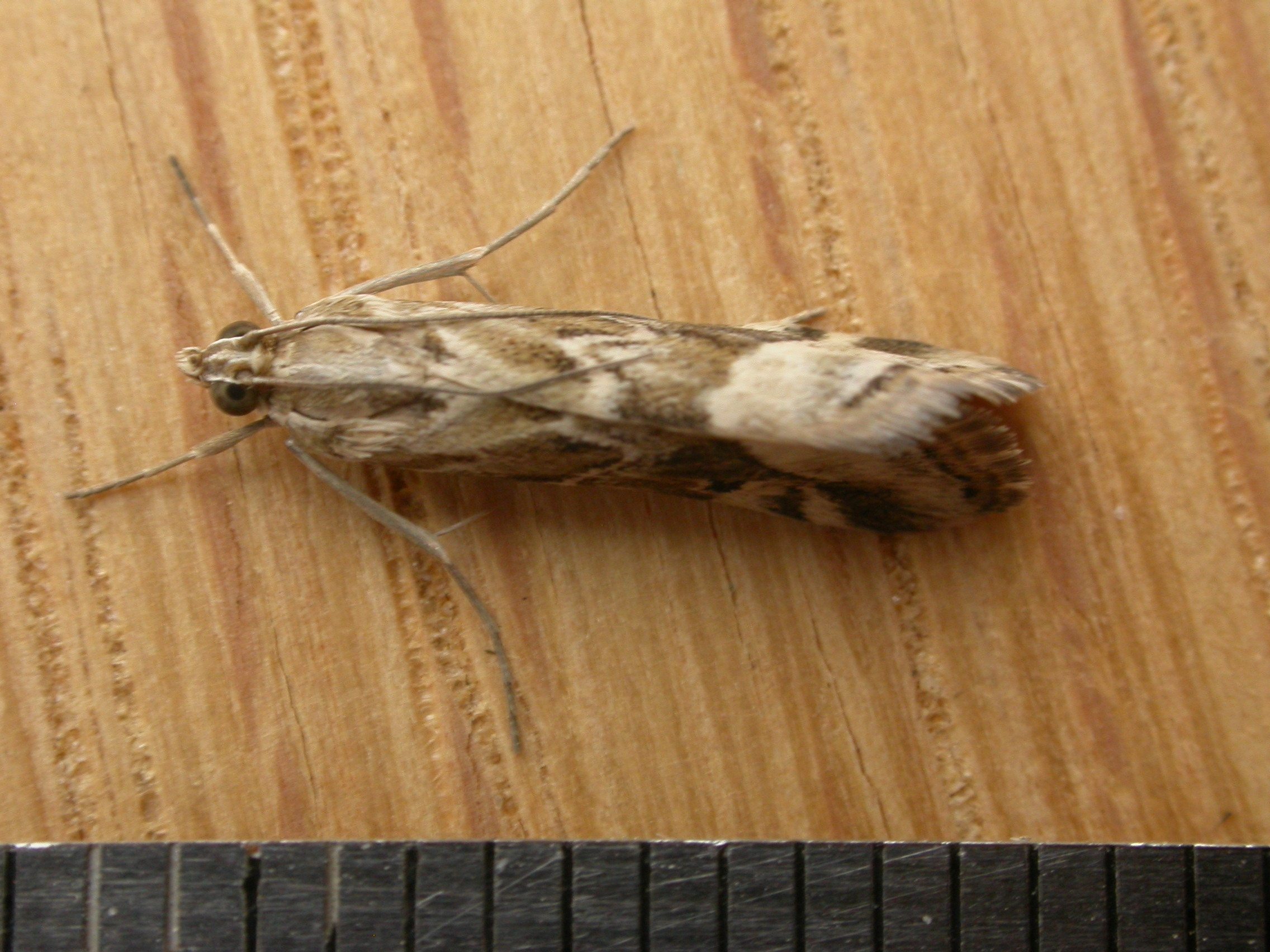

Scientific classification
- Kingdom: Animalia
- Phylum: Arthropoda
- Class: Insecta
- Order: Lepidoptera
- Family: Crambidae
- Genus: Hellula
- Species: H. hydralis

Binomial name
- Hellula hydralis Guenée, 1854

Synonyms
- Scopula criasusalis Walker, 1859; Scoparia optatusalis Walker, 1859; Pyralis subtrigonalis Walker, [1866]

= Hellula hydralis =

Species of moth

Hellula hydralis, the cabbage centre grub, is a moth of the family Crambidae. It was described by Achille Guenée in 1854 and is found throughout Australia.

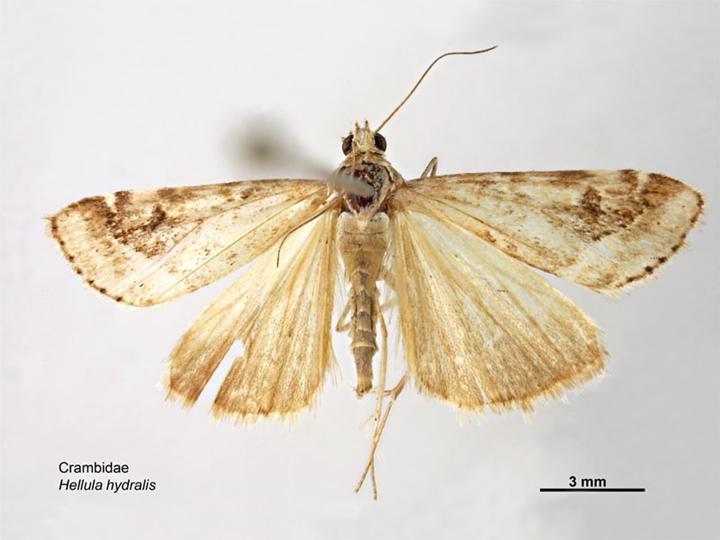
Dorsal view

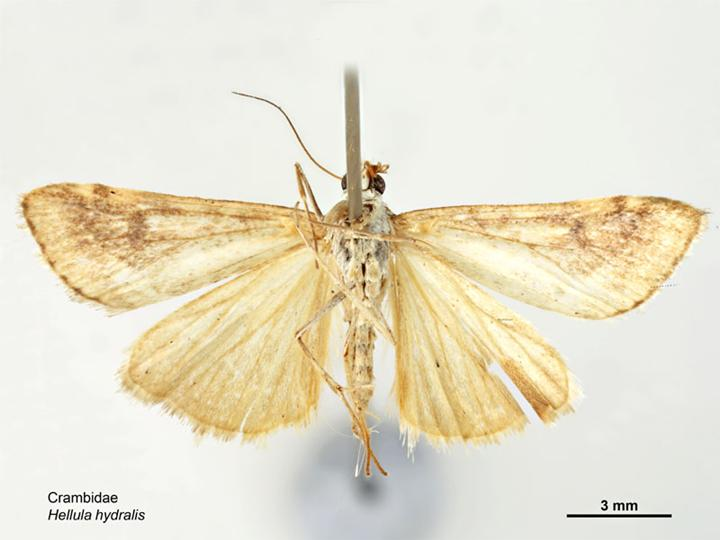
Ventral view

The wingspan is about 20 mm.

The larvae feed on Brassica oleracea and Brassica napus.
