= Alatuncusia gilvicostalis =

Scientific classification
- Kingdom: Animalia
- Phylum: Arthropoda
- Clade: Pancrustacea
- Class: Insecta
- Order: Lepidoptera
- Family: Crambidae
- Genus: Alatuncusia
- Species: A. gilvicostalis

Binomial name
- Alatuncusia gilvicostalis (Hampson, 1918)

Synonyms
- Lygropia gilvicostalis Hampson, 1918

Species of moth

Alatuncusia gilvicostalis is a moth in the family Crambidae. It was described by George Hampson in 1918. It is found in Peru.

The wingspan is about 24 mm. The forewings are brown with a leaden-grey hue. The costal area is pale yellow up to the postmedial line. The antemedial line is dark but indistinct, faintly defined on the inner side by yellowish white. There is a faint dark discoidal spot. The postmedial line is dark and rather diffused, defined on the outer side by a triangular pale yellow spot at the costa, then faintly by whitish up to vein two, then by yellowish white. There is a diffused white terminal line. The hindwings are white, the inner margin tinged with reddish brown. There is a rather diffused rufous terminal line.
