= Aureopteryx calistoalis =

Scientific classification
- Kingdom: Animalia
- Phylum: Arthropoda
- Class: Insecta
- Order: Lepidoptera
- Family: Crambidae
- Genus: Aureopteryx
- Species: A. calistoalis

Binomial name
- Aureopteryx calistoalis (Walker, 1859)

Synonyms
- Cataclysta calistoalis Walker, 1859

Species of moth

Aureopteryx calistoalis is a moth in the family Crambidae. It was described by Francis Walker in 1859. It is found in Brazil.
