= Eupoca =

Scientific classification
- Kingdom: Animalia
- Phylum: Arthropoda
- Class: Insecta
- Order: Lepidoptera
- Family: Crambidae
- Subfamily: Glaphyriinae
- Genus: Eupoca; Warren, 1891

Genus of moths

Eupoca is a genus of moths of the family Crambidae.

== Species ==
- Eupoca bifascialis
- Eupoca chicalis (Schaus, 1920)
- Eupoca definita
- Eupoca haakei Solis & Adamski, 1998
- Eupoca leucolepia
- Eupoca micralis
- Eupoca polyorma
- Eupoca sanctalis
