= Lissophanes =

Scientific classification
- Kingdom: Animalia
- Phylum: Arthropoda
- Class: Insecta
- Order: Lepidoptera
- Family: Crambidae
- Subfamily: Glaphyriinae
- Genus: Lissophanes; Warren, 1891
- Species: L. ceramica

Binomial name
- Lissophanes ceramica Warren, 1891

Genus of moths

Lissophanes is a genus of moths of the family Crambidae. It contains only one species, Lissophanes ceramica, which is found in Peru.

The wingspan is about 12 mm. The forewings are pale cream, suffused with dull pale olive and dusted with greyish. The hindwings are dull olive-grey, spotted with white and with a dark grey basal line.
