= Scybalista restionalis =

Scientific classification
- Kingdom: Animalia
- Phylum: Arthropoda
- Class: Insecta
- Order: Lepidoptera
- Family: Crambidae
- Genus: Scybalista
- Species: S. restionalis

Binomial name
- Scybalista restionalis Lederer, 1863

Species of moth

Scybalista restionalis is a moth in the family Crambidae. It was described by Julius Lederer in 1863. It is found in Venezuela.
