= Hellula caecigena =

Scientific classification
- Kingdom: Animalia
- Phylum: Arthropoda
- Class: Insecta
- Order: Lepidoptera
- Family: Crambidae
- Genus: Hellula
- Species: H. caecigena

Binomial name
- Hellula caecigena (Meyrick, 1933)

Synonyms
- Oeobia caecigena Meyrick, 1933

Species of moth

Hellula caecigena is a moth in the family Crambidae. It was described by Edward Meyrick in 1933. It is found in the Democratic Republic of the Congo, where it has been recorded from Katanga, Kongo Central and Kasai-Occidental.
