= Pseudoligostigma phaeomeralis =

Scientific classification
- Kingdom: Animalia
- Phylum: Arthropoda
- Class: Insecta
- Order: Lepidoptera
- Family: Crambidae
- Genus: Pseudoligostigma
- Species: P. phaeomeralis

Binomial name
- Pseudoligostigma phaeomeralis (Hampson, 1917)

Synonyms
- Ambia phaeomeralis Hampson, 1917; Pseudoligostigma phacomeralis

Species of moth

Pseudoligostigma phaeomeralis is a moth in the family Crambidae. It is found in Bolivia.
