= Contortipalpia =

Scientific classification
- Kingdom: Animalia
- Phylum: Arthropoda
- Class: Insecta
- Order: Lepidoptera
- Family: Crambidae
- Subfamily: Glaphyriinae
- Genus: Contortipalpia; Munroe, 1964

Genus of moths

Contortipalpia is a genus of moths of the family Crambidae.

== Species ==
- Contortipalpia masculina Munroe, 1964
- Contortipalpia santiagalis (Schaus, 1920)
