= Dichogama obsolescens =

Scientific classification
- Kingdom: Animalia
- Phylum: Arthropoda
- Class: Insecta
- Order: Lepidoptera
- Family: Crambidae
- Genus: Dichogama
- Species: D. obsolescens

Binomial name
- Dichogama obsolescens Hampson, 1912

Species of moth

Dichogama obsolescens is a moth in the family Crambidae. It was described by George Hampson in 1912. It is found on Grenada in the West Indies.
