= Pseudoligostigma punctissimalis =

Scientific classification
- Kingdom: Animalia
- Phylum: Arthropoda
- Class: Insecta
- Order: Lepidoptera
- Family: Crambidae
- Genus: Pseudoligostigma
- Species: P. punctissimalis

Binomial name
- Pseudoligostigma punctissimalis (Dyar, 1914)

Synonyms
- Lipocosma punctissimalis Dyar, 1914; Lipocosma teliferalis Dyar, 1914

Species of moth

Pseudoligostigma punctissimalis is a moth in the family Crambidae described by Harrison Gray Dyar Jr. in 1914. It is found from north-western Costa Rica to Panama and Trinidad.
