= Gonodiscus =

Scientific classification
- Kingdom: Animalia
- Phylum: Arthropoda
- Class: Insecta
- Order: Lepidoptera
- Family: Crambidae
- Subfamily: Glaphyriinae
- Genus: Gonodiscus; Warren, 1891
- Species: G. amplalis

Binomial name
- Gonodiscus amplalis Warren, 1891

Genus of moths

Gonodiscus is a genus of the moth's family Crambidae. It contains only one species, Gonodiscus amplalis, which is found in Chile.
