= Plumegesta callidalis =

Scientific classification
- Kingdom: Animalia
- Phylum: Arthropoda
- Class: Insecta
- Order: Lepidoptera
- Family: Crambidae
- Genus: Plumegesta
- Species: P. callidalis

Binomial name
- Plumegesta callidalis (Hampson, 1901)

Synonyms
- Entephria callidalis Hampson, 1901

Species of moth

Plumegesta callidalis is a moth in the family Crambidae. It is found on the Bahamas.
