= Hellula phidilealis =

Scientific classification
- Kingdom: Animalia
- Phylum: Arthropoda
- Class: Insecta
- Order: Lepidoptera
- Family: Crambidae
- Genus: Hellula
- Species: H. phidilealis

Binomial name
- Hellula phidilealis (Walker, 1859)

Synonyms
- Leucochroma phidilealis Walker, 1859; Phyratocosma trypheropa Meyrick, 1936

Species of moth

Hellula phidilealis, the cabbage budworm moth, is a moth of the family Crambidae. It is found in tropical and subtropical America. From the southern United States (Florida to Arizona), north in the east to North Carolina, south through southwestern Mexico to northern South America, including several islands in the Caribbean.

The wingspan is about 15 mm.
