= Achantodes =

Scientific classification
- Kingdom: Animalia
- Phylum: Arthropoda
- Clade: Pancrustacea
- Class: Insecta
- Order: Lepidoptera
- Family: Crambidae
- Subfamily: Glaphyriinae
- Genus: Achantodes; Guenée, 1852
- Species: A. cerusicosta

Binomial name
- Achantodes cerusicosta Guenée, 1852

Genus of moths

Achantodes is a genus of moths of the family Crambidae. It contains only one species, Achantodes cerusicosta, which is found in Colombia.
