= Scybalistodes fortis =

Scientific classification
- Kingdom: Animalia
- Phylum: Arthropoda
- Class: Insecta
- Order: Lepidoptera
- Family: Crambidae
- Genus: Scybalistodes
- Species: S. fortis

Binomial name
- Scybalistodes fortis Munroe, 1972

Species of moth

Scybalistodes fortis is a moth in the family Crambidae. It is found in North America, where it has been recorded from Arizona.
