= Abegesta remellalis =

Scientific classification
- Kingdom: Animalia
- Phylum: Arthropoda
- Clade: Pancrustacea
- Class: Insecta
- Order: Lepidoptera
- Family: Crambidae
- Genus: Abegesta
- Species: A. remellalis

Binomial name
- Abegesta remellalis (H. Druce, 1899)

Synonyms
- Homophysa remellalis H. Druce, 1899

Species of moth

Abegesta remellalis, the white-trimmed abegesta or white-trimmed brown pyralid moth, is a moth in the family Crambidae. It was described by Herbert Druce in 1899. It is found in Mexico and the south-western United States, where it has been recorded from Arizona, California and New Mexico.

The forewings are yellowish orange to brown with white median and subterminal lines. The terminal line is gray with black dots. The hindwings are creamy white, shaded with pale reddish brown from the apex to the inner angle. Adults are on wing from June to September.
