= Scybalistodes periculosalis =

Scientific classification
- Kingdom: Animalia
- Phylum: Arthropoda
- Class: Insecta
- Order: Lepidoptera
- Family: Crambidae
- Genus: Scybalistodes
- Species: S. periculosalis

Binomial name
- Scybalistodes periculosalis (Dyar, 1908)

Synonyms
- Glaphyria periculosalis Dyar, 1908

Species of moth

Scybalistodes periculosalis is a moth in the family Crambidae. It was described by Harrison Gray Dyar Jr. in 1908. It has been recorded from the US state of California.
