= Eupoca leucolepia =

Scientific classification
- Kingdom: Animalia
- Phylum: Arthropoda
- Class: Insecta
- Order: Lepidoptera
- Family: Crambidae
- Genus: Eupoca
- Species: E. leucolepia

Binomial name
- Eupoca leucolepia (Hampson, 1898)

Synonyms
- Scybalista leucolepia Hampson, 1898

Species of moth

Eupoca leucolepia is a moth in the family Crambidae. It is found in Brazil.
