= Hellula subbasalis =

Scientific classification
- Kingdom: Animalia
- Phylum: Arthropoda
- Class: Insecta
- Order: Lepidoptera
- Family: Crambidae
- Genus: Hellula
- Species: H. subbasalis

Binomial name
- Hellula subbasalis (Dyar, 1923)

Synonyms
- Lamprosema subbasalis Dyar, 1923

Species of moth

Hellula subbasalis is a moth in the family Crambidae. It was described by Harrison Gray Dyar Jr. in 1923. It has been recorded from the US state of California.
