= Agastya hyblaeoides =

Scientific classification
- Kingdom: Animalia
- Phylum: Arthropoda
- Clade: Pancrustacea
- Class: Insecta
- Order: Lepidoptera
- Family: Crambidae
- Subfamily: Glaphyriinae
- Genus: Agastya; Moore, 1881
- Species: A. hyblaeoides

Binomial name
- Agastya hyblaeoides Moore, 1881

Synonyms
- Agastia Moore, 1881; Agastya flavomaculata Moore, 1881

Genus of moths

Agastya is a monotypic moth genus of the family Crambidae described by Frederic Moore in 1881. It contains only one species, Agastya hyblaeoides, described by the same author in the same year, which is found in Sikkim, India.
