= Hellula kempae =

Scientific classification
- Domain: Eukaryota
- Kingdom: Animalia
- Phylum: Arthropoda
- Class: Insecta
- Order: Lepidoptera
- Family: Crambidae
- Genus: Hellula
- Species: H. kempae

Binomial name
- Hellula kempae Munroe, 1972

Species of moth

Hellula kempae, or Kemp's hellula moth, is a moth in the family Crambidae. It was described by Eugene G. Munroe in 1972. It is found in North America, where it has been recorded from Alabama, Florida, Mississippi, South Carolina and Texas. It is also found in Cuba. Adults have been recorded on wing from March to August and from October to December.
