= Abegesta concha =

Scientific classification
- Kingdom: Animalia
- Phylum: Arthropoda
- Clade: Pancrustacea
- Class: Insecta
- Order: Lepidoptera
- Family: Crambidae
- Genus: Abegesta
- Species: A. concha

Binomial name
- Abegesta concha Munroe, 1964

Species of moth

Abegesta concha is a moth in the family Crambidae. It was described by Eugene G. Munroe in 1964. It is found in North America, where it has been recorded from Arizona, California and New Mexico.
