= Parambia =

Scientific classification
- Kingdom: Animalia
- Phylum: Arthropoda
- Class: Insecta
- Order: Lepidoptera
- Family: Crambidae
- Subfamily: Glaphyriinae
- Genus: Parambia; Dyar, 1914

Genus of moths

Parambia is a genus of moths of the family Crambidae.

== Species ==
- Parambia cedroalis
- Parambia gnomosynalis Dyar, 1914
- Parambia paigniodesalis
