= Scybalistodes vermiculalis =

Scientific classification
- Kingdom: Animalia
- Phylum: Arthropoda
- Clade: Pancrustacea
- Class: Insecta
- Order: Lepidoptera
- Family: Crambidae
- Genus: Scybalistodes
- Species: S. vermiculalis

Binomial name
- Scybalistodes vermiculalis Munroe, 1964

Species of moth

Scybalistodes vermiculalis is a moth in the family Crambidae. It is found in North America, where it has been recorded in Arizona.

The wingspan is about 17 mm. Adults have been recorded on wing from April to May and from August to September.
