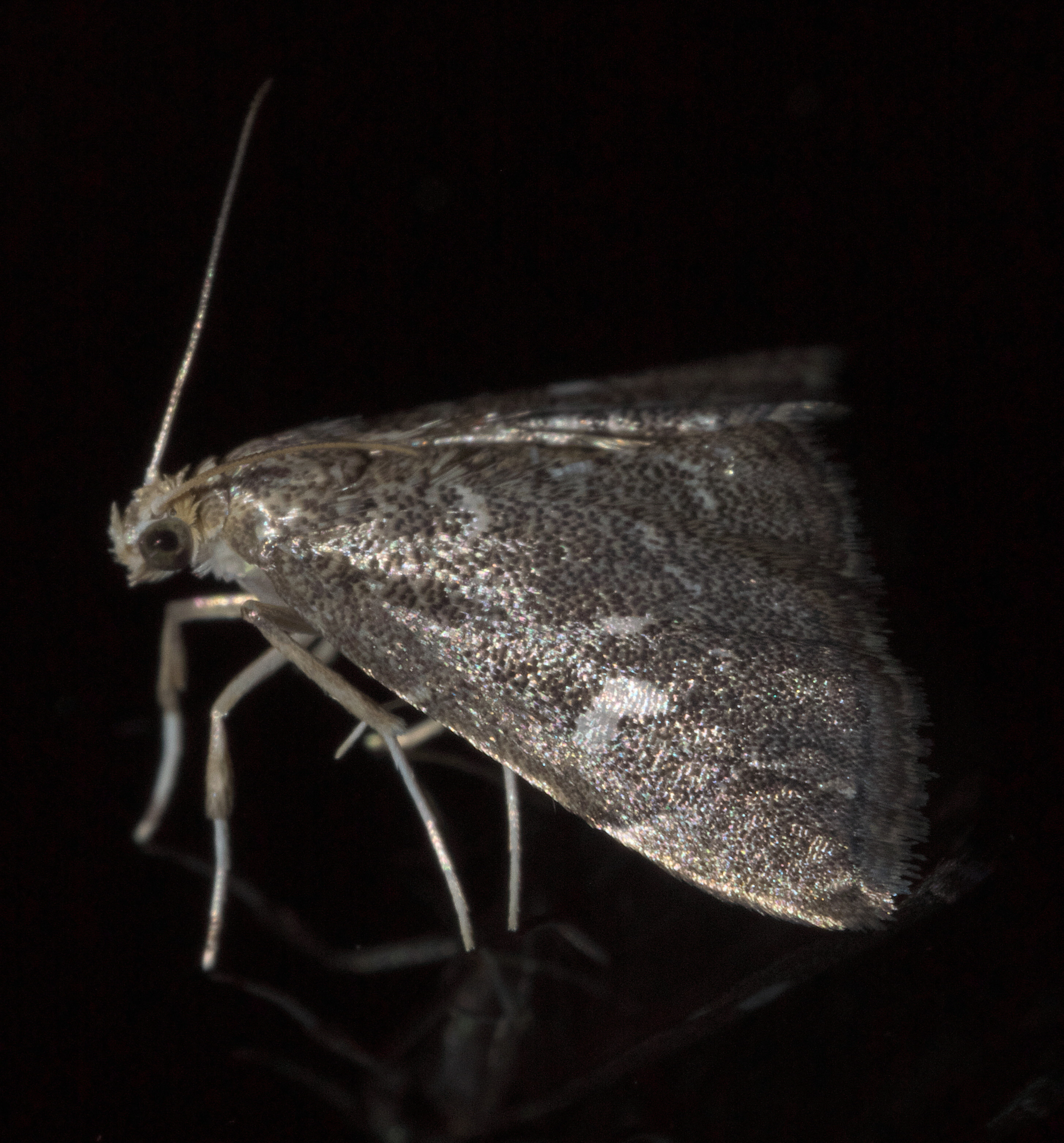

Scientific classification
- Kingdom: Animalia
- Phylum: Arthropoda
- Clade: Pancrustacea
- Class: Insecta
- Order: Lepidoptera
- Family: Crambidae
- Genus: Nephrogramma
- Species: N. reniculalis

Binomial name
- Nephrogramma reniculalis (Zeller, 1872)

Synonyms
- Homophysa reniculalis Zeller, 1872

= Nephrogramma reniculalis =

Species of moth

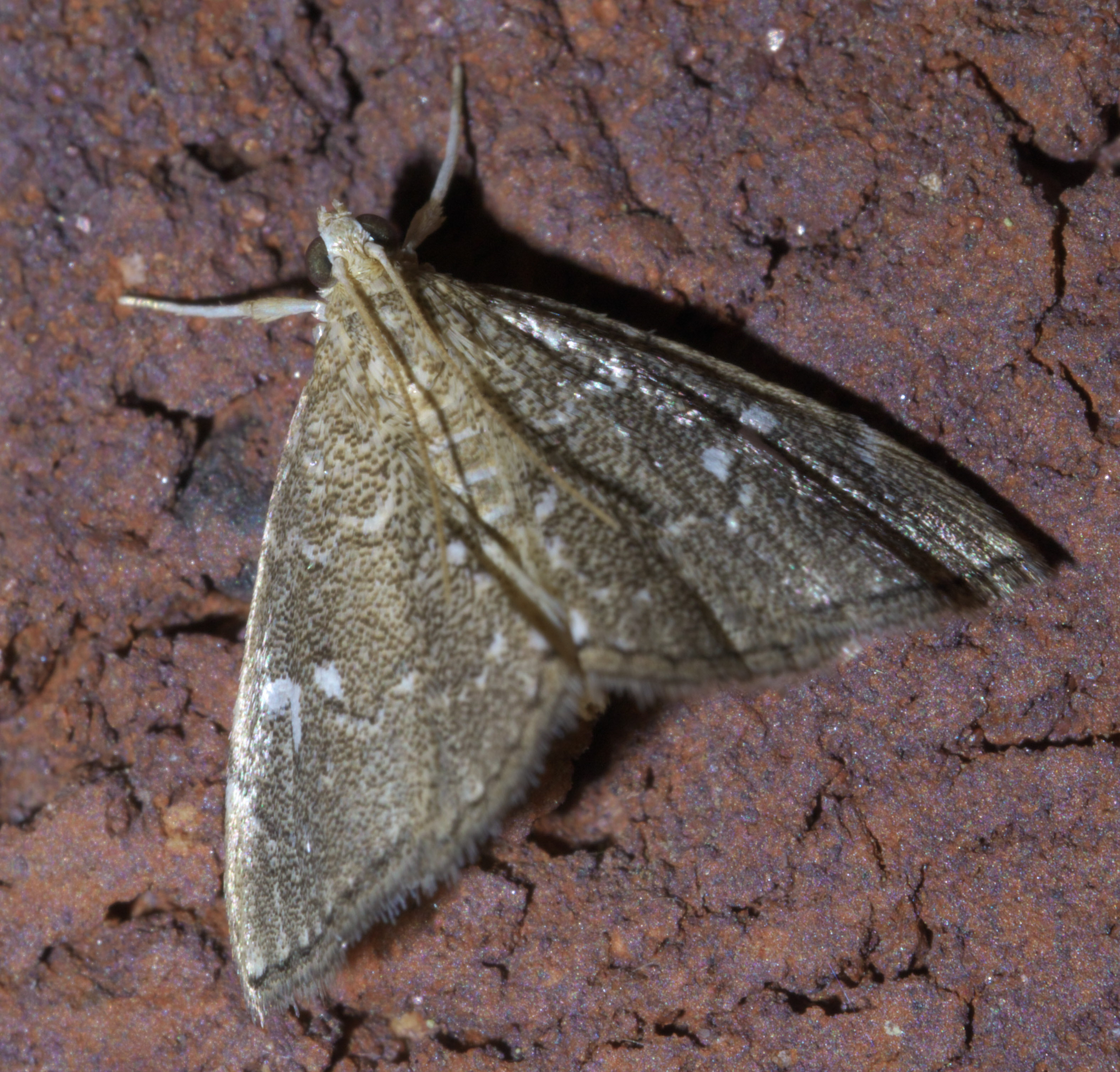
Nephrogramma reniculalis, kidney moth, Size: 5.9 mm body

Nephrogramma reniculalis, the kidney moth, is a moth in the family Crambidae. It was described by Zeller in 1872. It is found in North America, where it has been recorded from Arizona, Colorado, Georgia, Illinois, Indiana, Iowa, Kansas, Kentucky, Mississippi, Ohio, Oklahoma, Ontario and Texas.
