= Dichogama decoralis =

Scientific classification
- Kingdom: Animalia
- Phylum: Arthropoda
- Class: Insecta
- Order: Lepidoptera
- Family: Crambidae
- Genus: Dichogama
- Species: D. decoralis

Binomial name
- Dichogama decoralis (Walker, [1866])

Synonyms
- Carbaca decoralis Walker, [1866]

Species of moth

Dichogama decoralis is a moth in the family Crambidae. It was described by Francis Walker in 1866. It is found on Hispaniola.
