= Aethiophysa savoralis =

Scientific classification
- Kingdom: Animalia
- Phylum: Arthropoda
- Clade: Pancrustacea
- Class: Insecta
- Order: Lepidoptera
- Family: Crambidae
- Genus: Aethiophysa
- Species: A. savoralis

Binomial name
- Aethiophysa savoralis (Schaus, 1920)

Synonyms
- Lipocosma savoralis Schaus, 1920

Species of moth

Aethiophysa savoralis is a moth in the family Crambidae. It was described by Schaus in 1920. It is found in Cuba and Puerto Rico.
