= Psephis gomalis =

Scientific classification
- Kingdom: Animalia
- Phylum: Arthropoda
- Class: Insecta
- Order: Lepidoptera
- Family: Crambidae
- Genus: Psephis
- Species: P. gomalis

Binomial name
- Psephis gomalis Schaus, 1920

Species of moth

Psephis gomalis is a moth in the family Crambidae. It was described by Schaus in 1920. It is found in Guatemala.
