= Contortipalpia santiagalis =

Scientific classification
- Kingdom: Animalia
- Phylum: Arthropoda
- Class: Insecta
- Order: Lepidoptera
- Family: Crambidae
- Genus: Contortipalpia
- Species: C. santiagalis

Binomial name
- Contortipalpia santiagalis (Schaus, 1920)

Synonyms
- Tyspanodes santiagalis Schaus, 1920

Species of moth

Contortipalpia santiagalis is a moth in the family Crambidae. It was described by Schaus in 1920. It is found in Cuba.
