= Aureopteryx olufsoni =

Scientific classification
- Kingdom: Animalia
- Phylum: Arthropoda
- Clade: Pancrustacea
- Class: Insecta
- Order: Lepidoptera
- Family: Crambidae
- Genus: Aureopteryx
- Species: A. olufsoni

Binomial name
- Aureopteryx olufsoni Solis & Adamski, 1998

Species of moth

Aureopteryx olufsoni is a moth in the family Crambidae described by Maria Alma Solis and David Adamski in 1998. It is found in the southern Atlantic and Pacific lowlands of Costa Rica.
