= Pseudoligostigma enantialis =

Scientific classification
- Kingdom: Animalia
- Phylum: Arthropoda
- Class: Insecta
- Order: Lepidoptera
- Family: Crambidae
- Genus: Pseudoligostigma
- Species: P. enantialis

Binomial name
- Pseudoligostigma enantialis (Dyar, 1914)

Synonyms
- Ambia enantialis Dyar, 1914

Species of moth

Pseudoligostigma enantialis is a moth in the family Crambidae. It is found in Panama.
