= Scybalistodes rivuloides =

Scientific classification
- Kingdom: Animalia
- Phylum: Arthropoda
- Class: Insecta
- Order: Lepidoptera
- Family: Crambidae
- Genus: Scybalistodes
- Species: S. rivuloides

Binomial name
- Scybalistodes rivuloides Munroe, 1964

Species of moth

Scybalistodes rivuloides is a moth in the family Crambidae. It is found in Mexico.
