= Hellula simplicalis =

Scientific classification
- Kingdom: Animalia
- Phylum: Arthropoda
- Class: Insecta
- Order: Lepidoptera
- Family: Crambidae
- Genus: Hellula
- Species: H. simplicalis

Binomial name
- Hellula simplicalis Herrich-Schäffer, 1871

Species of moth

Hellula simplicalis is a moth in the family Crambidae. It was described by Gottlieb August Wilhelm Herrich-Schäffer in 1871. It is found in Cuba.
