= Eupoca chicalis =

Scientific classification
- Kingdom: Animalia
- Phylum: Arthropoda
- Class: Insecta
- Order: Lepidoptera
- Family: Crambidae
- Genus: Eupoca
- Species: E. chicalis

Binomial name
- Eupoca chicalis (Schaus, 1920)

Synonyms
- Scybalista chicalis Schaus, 1920

Species of moth

Eupoca chicalis is a moth in the family Crambidae. It was described by William Schaus in 1920. It is found from Guatemala south-east to French Guiana.
