= Alatuncusiodes =

Scientific classification
- Kingdom: Animalia
- Phylum: Arthropoda
- Clade: Pancrustacea
- Class: Insecta
- Order: Lepidoptera
- Family: Crambidae
- Subfamily: Glaphyriinae
- Genus: Alatuncusiodes; Munroe, 1974
- Species: A. korytkowskii

Binomial name
- Alatuncusiodes korytkowskii Munroe, 1974

Genus of moths

Alatuncusiodes is a genus of grass moths that belongs to the subfamily Glaphyriinae. The genus is monotypic containing only one species, Alatuncusiodes korytkowskii. This genus can be found in Peru.

This species was described on 1974 by Eugene Gordon Munroe, a Canadian Entomologist.
