= Scybalistodes illosalis =

Scientific classification
- Kingdom: Animalia
- Phylum: Arthropoda
- Class: Insecta
- Order: Lepidoptera
- Family: Crambidae
- Genus: Scybalistodes
- Species: S. illosalis

Binomial name
- Scybalistodes illosalis (Dyar, 1914)

Synonyms
- Lipocosma illosalis Dyar, 1914

Species of moth

Scybalistodes illosalis is a moth in the family Crambidae. It was described by Harrison Gray Dyar Jr. in 1914. It is found in Mexico.
