= Abegesta reluctalis =

Scientific classification
- Kingdom: Animalia
- Phylum: Arthropoda
- Clade: Pancrustacea
- Class: Insecta
- Order: Lepidoptera
- Family: Crambidae
- Genus: Abegesta
- Species: A. reluctalis

Binomial name
- Abegesta reluctalis (Hulst, 1886)

Synonyms
- Orobena reluctalis Hulst, 1886; Glaphria reluctalis

Species of moth

Abegesta reluctalis is a moth in the family Crambidae. It was described by George Duryea Hulst in 1886. It is found in North America, where it has been recorded from Arizona, California, Maryland and New Mexico.

The wingspan is about 15–16 mm. The forewings are golden with a brownish shade and two white lines. The hindwings are white, washed with fuscous ochreous at the base. Adults have been recorded on wing from June to September.
