= Aureopteryx glorialis =

Scientific classification
- Kingdom: Animalia
- Phylum: Arthropoda
- Class: Insecta
- Order: Lepidoptera
- Family: Crambidae
- Genus: Aureopteryx
- Species: A. glorialis

Binomial name
- Aureopteryx glorialis (Schaus, 1920)

Synonyms
- Symphysa glorialis Schaus, 1920

Species of moth

Aureopteryx glorialis is a moth in the family Crambidae. It was described by Schaus in 1920. It is found in French Guiana.
