= Aenigmodes =

Scientific classification
- Kingdom: Animalia
- Phylum: Arthropoda
- Clade: Pancrustacea
- Class: Insecta
- Order: Lepidoptera
- Family: Crambidae
- Subfamily: Glaphyriinae
- Genus: Aenigmodes; Amsel, 1957
- Species: A. pentascia

Binomial name
- Aenigmodes pentascia (Meyrick, 1936)

Synonyms
- Aenigma Amsel, 1956; Homophysa pentascia Meyrick, 1936

Genus of moths

Aenigmodes is a genus of moths of the family Crambidae. It contains only one species, Aenigmodes pentascia, which is found in Venezuela.
