= Scybalistodes violetalis =

Scientific classification
- Kingdom: Animalia
- Phylum: Arthropoda
- Class: Insecta
- Order: Lepidoptera
- Family: Crambidae
- Genus: Scybalistodes
- Species: S. violetalis

Binomial name
- Scybalistodes violetalis Munroe, 1964

Species of moth

Scybalistodes violetalis is a moth in the family Crambidae. It is found in Mexico.
