= Vinculopsis epipaschia =

Scientific classification
- Kingdom: Animalia
- Phylum: Arthropoda
- Class: Insecta
- Order: Lepidoptera
- Family: Crambidae
- Genus: Vinculopsis
- Species: V. epipaschia

Binomial name
- Vinculopsis epipaschia Munroe, 1964

Species of moth

Vinculopsis epipaschia is a moth in the family Crambidae. It is found in Peru.
