= Aureopteryx argentistriata =

Scientific classification
- Kingdom: Animalia
- Phylum: Arthropoda
- Class: Insecta
- Order: Lepidoptera
- Family: Crambidae
- Genus: Aureopteryx
- Species: A. argentistriata

Binomial name
- Aureopteryx argentistriata (Hampson, 1917)

Synonyms
- Ambia argentistriata Hampson, 1917

Species of moth

Aureopteryx argentistriata is a moth in the family Crambidae. It is found from central Mexico south to Paraguay, Brazil and Trinidad. The habitat consists of lowland areas.
