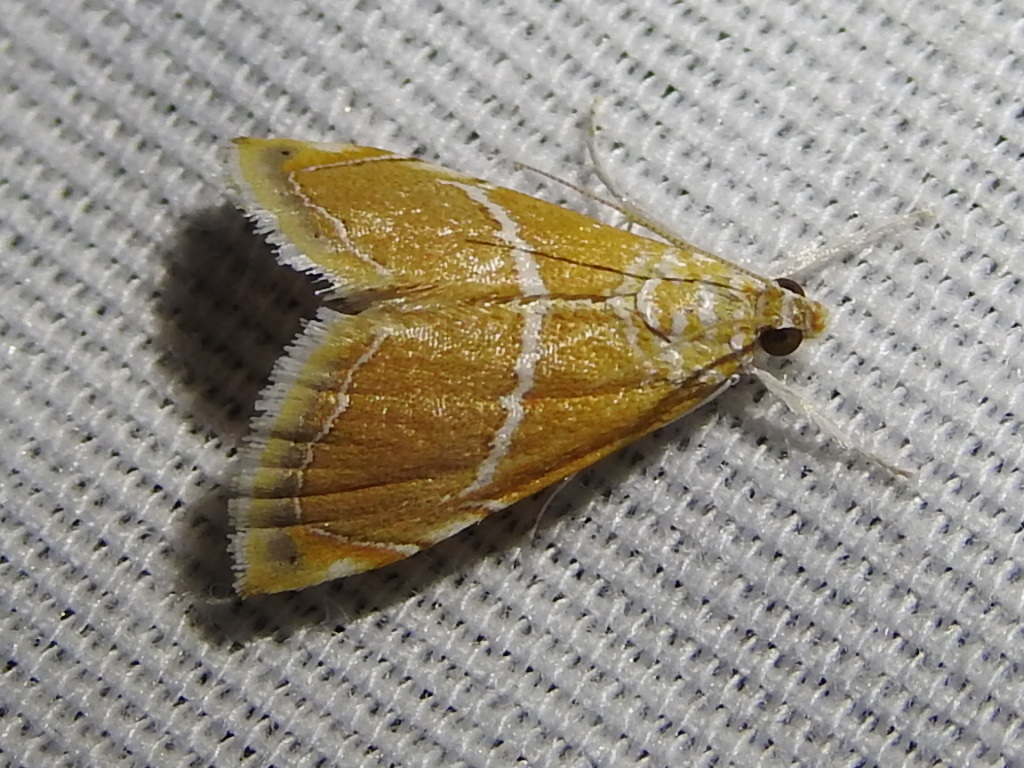

Scientific classification
- Kingdom: Animalia
- Phylum: Arthropoda
- Clade: Pancrustacea
- Class: Insecta
- Order: Lepidoptera
- Family: Crambidae
- Subfamily: Odontiinae
- Genus: Abegesta; Munroe, 1964

= Abegesta =

Genus of moths

Abegesta is a genus of moths of the family Crambidae. The genus was erected by Eugene G. Munroe in 1964.

== Species ==
- Abegesta concha Munroe, 1964
- Abegesta reluctalis (Hulst, 1886)
- Abegesta remellalis (Druce, 1899) – white-trimmed abegesta
