= Alatuncusia =

Scientific classification
- Kingdom: Animalia
- Phylum: Arthropoda
- Clade: Pancrustacea
- Class: Insecta
- Order: Lepidoptera
- Family: Crambidae
- Genus: Alatuncusia; Amsel, 1956

Genus of moths

Alatuncusia is a genus of moths of the family Crambidae.

== Species ==
- Alatuncusia bergii (Möschler, 1890)
- Alatuncusia canalis
- Alatuncusia fulvescens (Hampson, 1918)
- Alatuncusia gilvicostalis Hampson, 1918
- Alatuncusia subductalis
