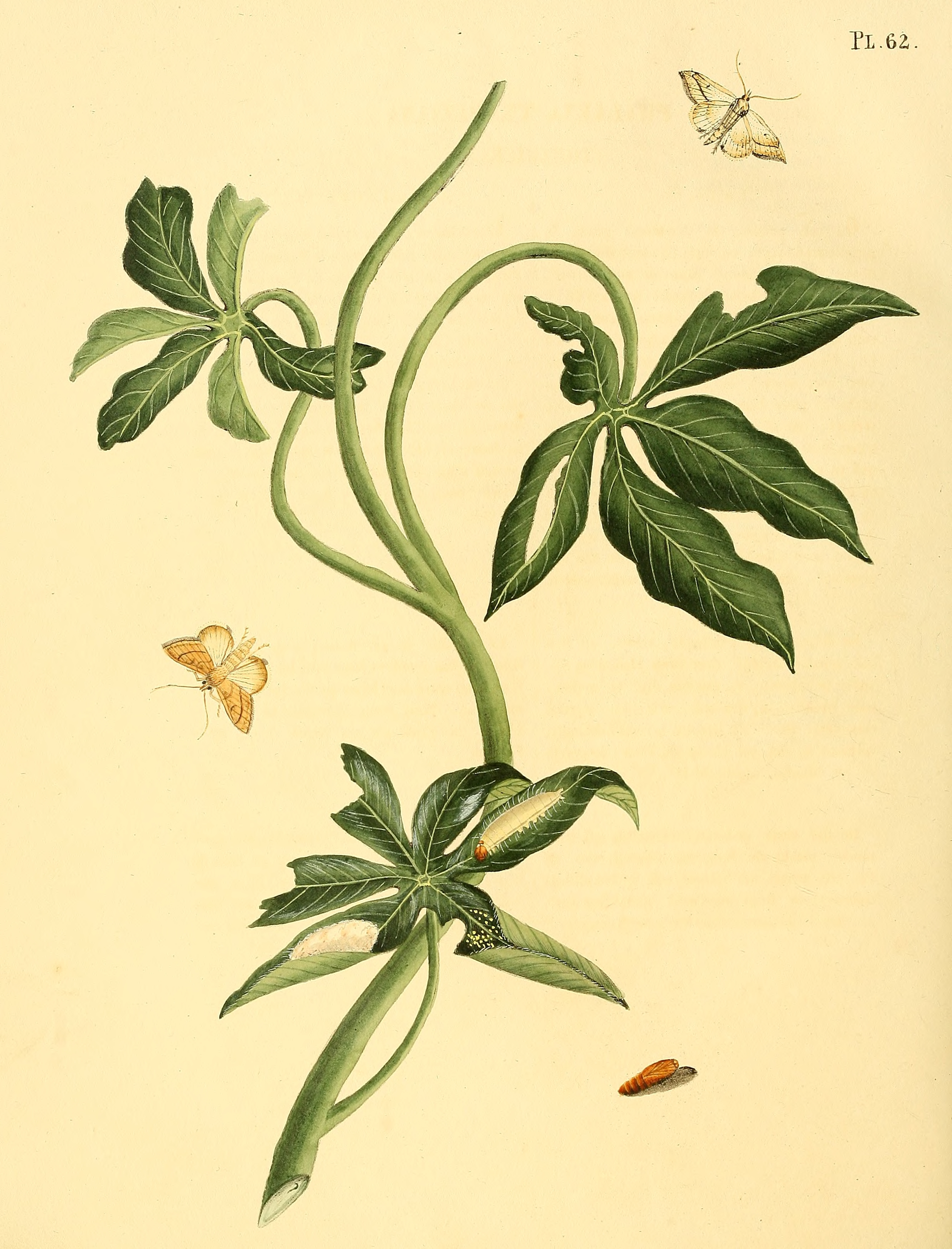

Scientific classification
- Domain: Eukaryota
- Kingdom: Animalia
- Phylum: Arthropoda
- Class: Insecta
- Order: Lepidoptera
- Family: Crambidae
- Genus: Chilozela; Munroe, 1964
- Species: C. trapeziana

Binomial name
- Chilozela trapeziana (Sepp, 1840)

Synonyms
- Phalaena (Tortrix) trapeziana Sepp, 1840; Botys jatrophalis Walker, 1859; Phlyctaenodes bifilalis Hampson, 1913

= Chilozela =

Genus of moths

Chilozela is a genus of moths of the family Crambidae. It contains only one species, Chilozela trapeziana, which is found from Costa Rica south to Peru.

The larvae feed on the leaves of Manihot esculenta.
