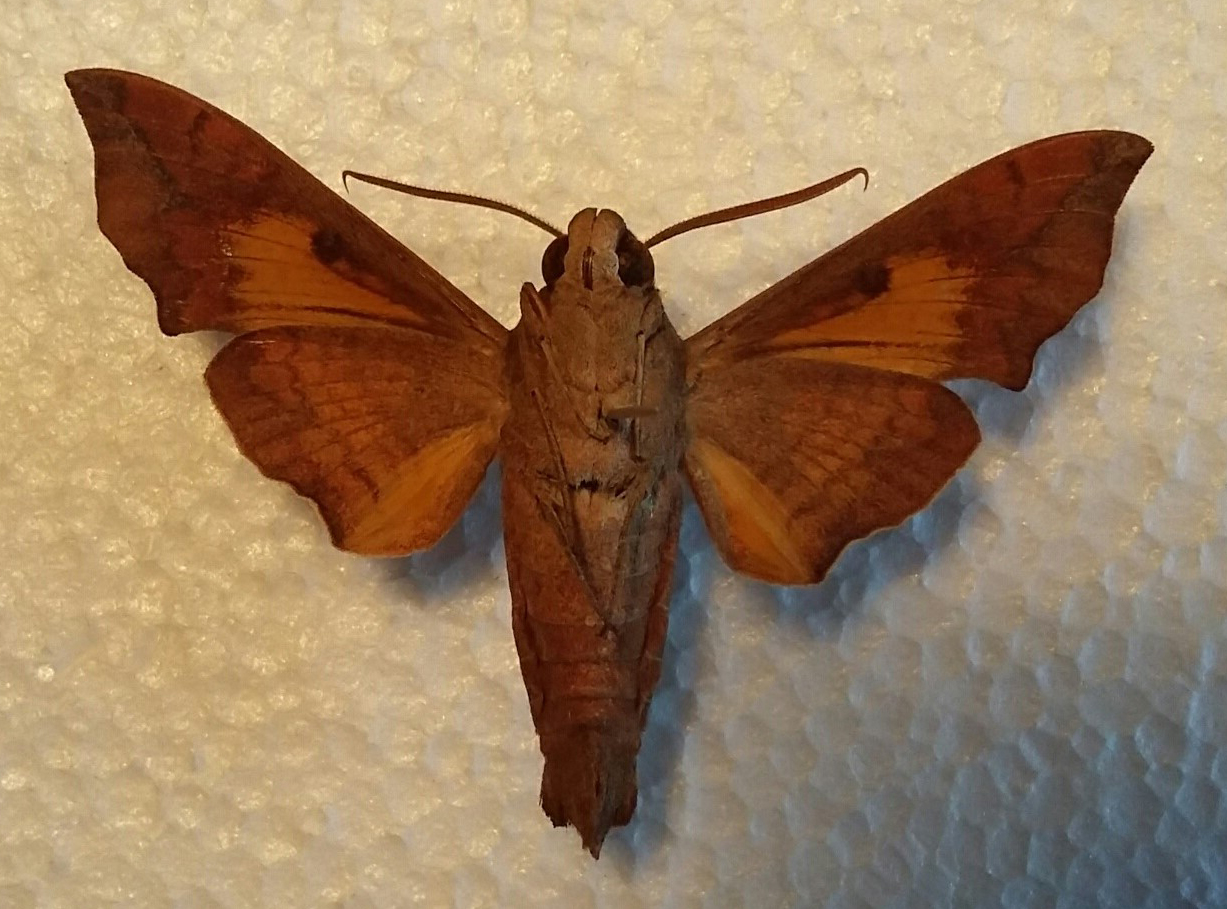

Scientific classification
- Kingdom: Animalia
- Phylum: Arthropoda
- Class: Insecta
- Order: Lepidoptera
- Family: Sphingidae
- Genus: Perigonia
- Species: P. thayeri

Binomial name
- Perigonia thayeri Clark, 1928

= Perigonia thayeri =

Species of moth

Perigonia thayeri is a moth of the family Sphingidae. It is native to the island of Saint Vincent.

The length of the forewings is about 32 mm. It is similar to Perigonia pallida, but the forewing apex and tornus are less acute and the distal margin is less convex medially. The forewing upperside ground colour is similar to Perigonia pallida, but the pattern is more contrasting and the dark apical line and discal spot are both more prominent. The forewing underside ground colour is paler and the irregular distal marginal band is darker. The median band of the hindwing upperside is deep yellow. The hindwing underside ground colour is paler than in Perigonia pallida and the median and postmedian transverse lines and the distal marginal border are more prominent.
