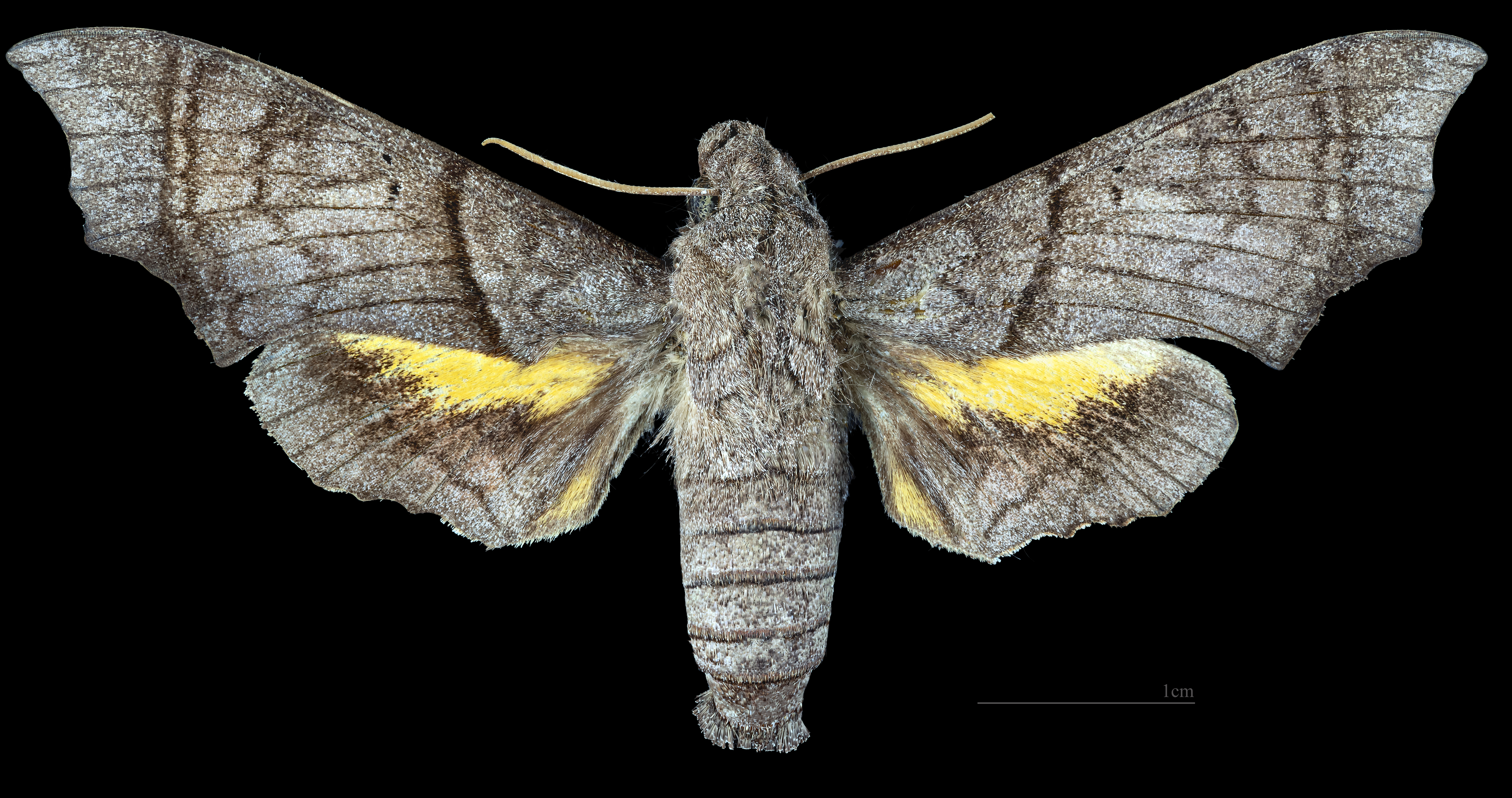
- Male dorsal
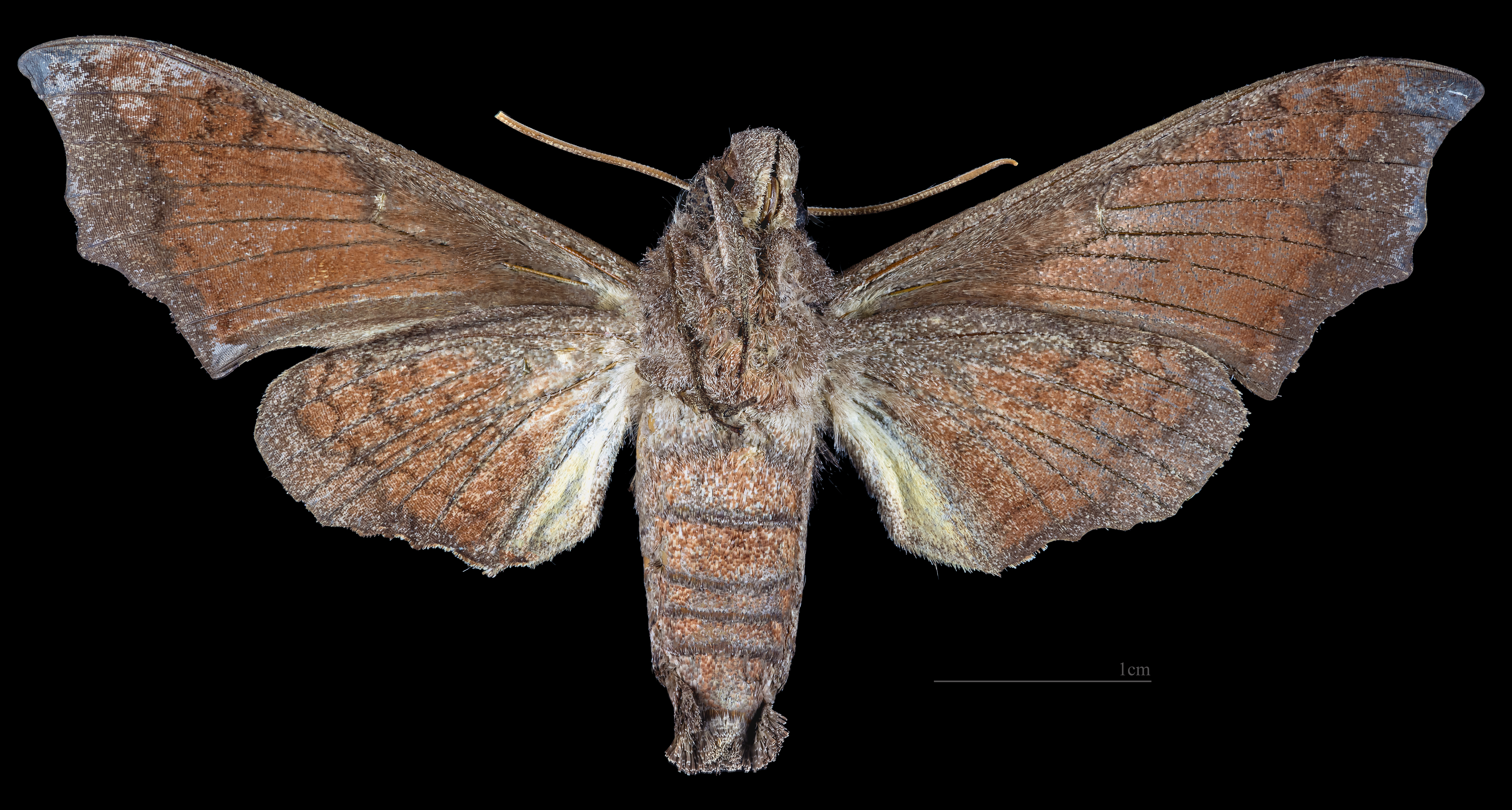
- Male ventral

Scientific classification
- Domain: Eukaryota
- Kingdom: Animalia
- Phylum: Arthropoda
- Class: Insecta
- Order: Lepidoptera
- Family: Sphingidae
- Genus: Perigonia
- Species: P. grisea

Binomial name
- Perigonia grisea Rothschild & Jordan, 1903

= Perigonia grisea =

Moth native to Bolivia

Perigonia grisea is a moth of the family Sphingidae. It is known from Bolivia.

It can be distinguished from all other Perigonia species by the uniform grey forewing upperside crossed by narrow, dark brown transverse lines. The hindwing upperside is most similar to Perigonia stulta but the yellow tornal patch is larger.

Adults have been recorded from March to April.
