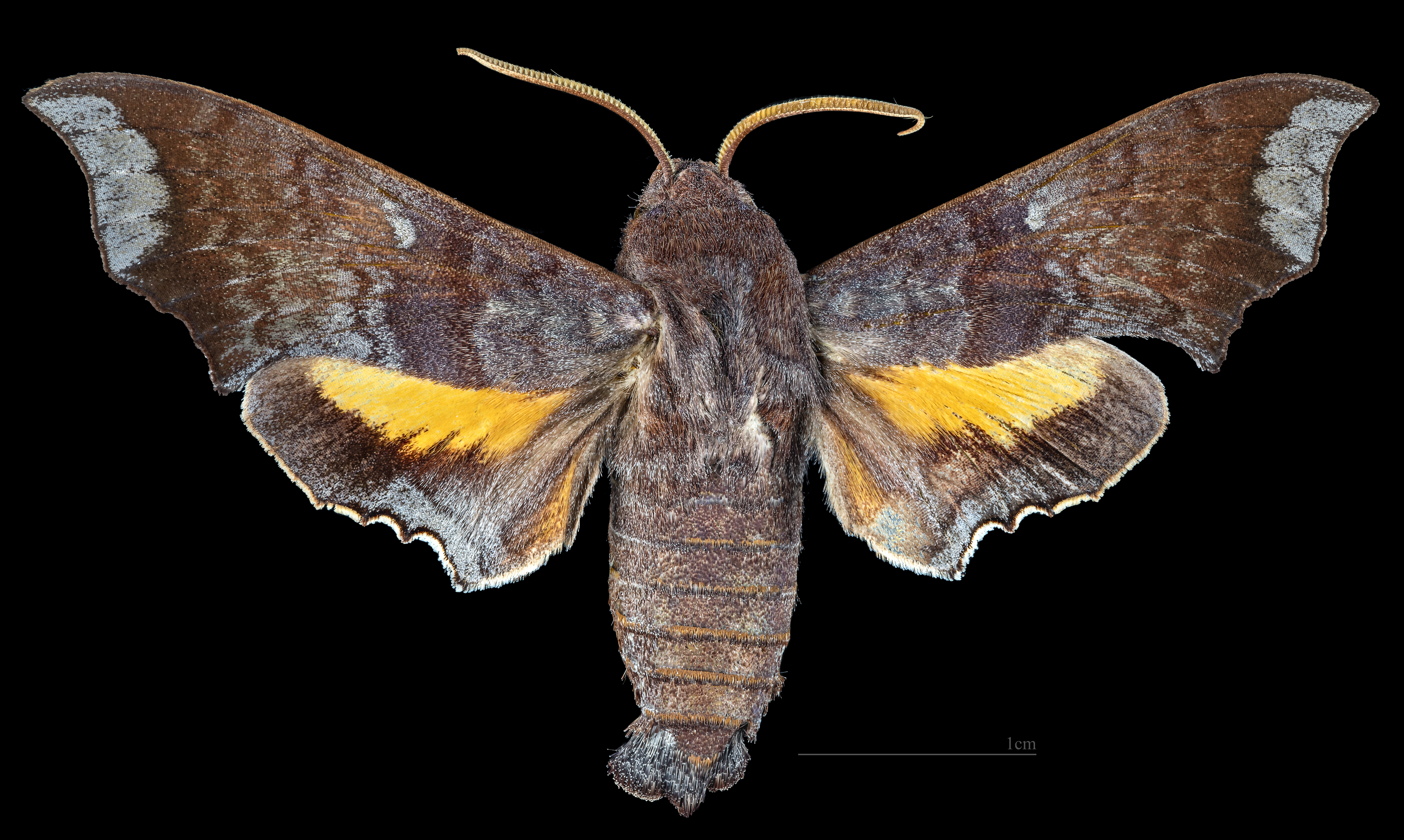
- Male dorsal
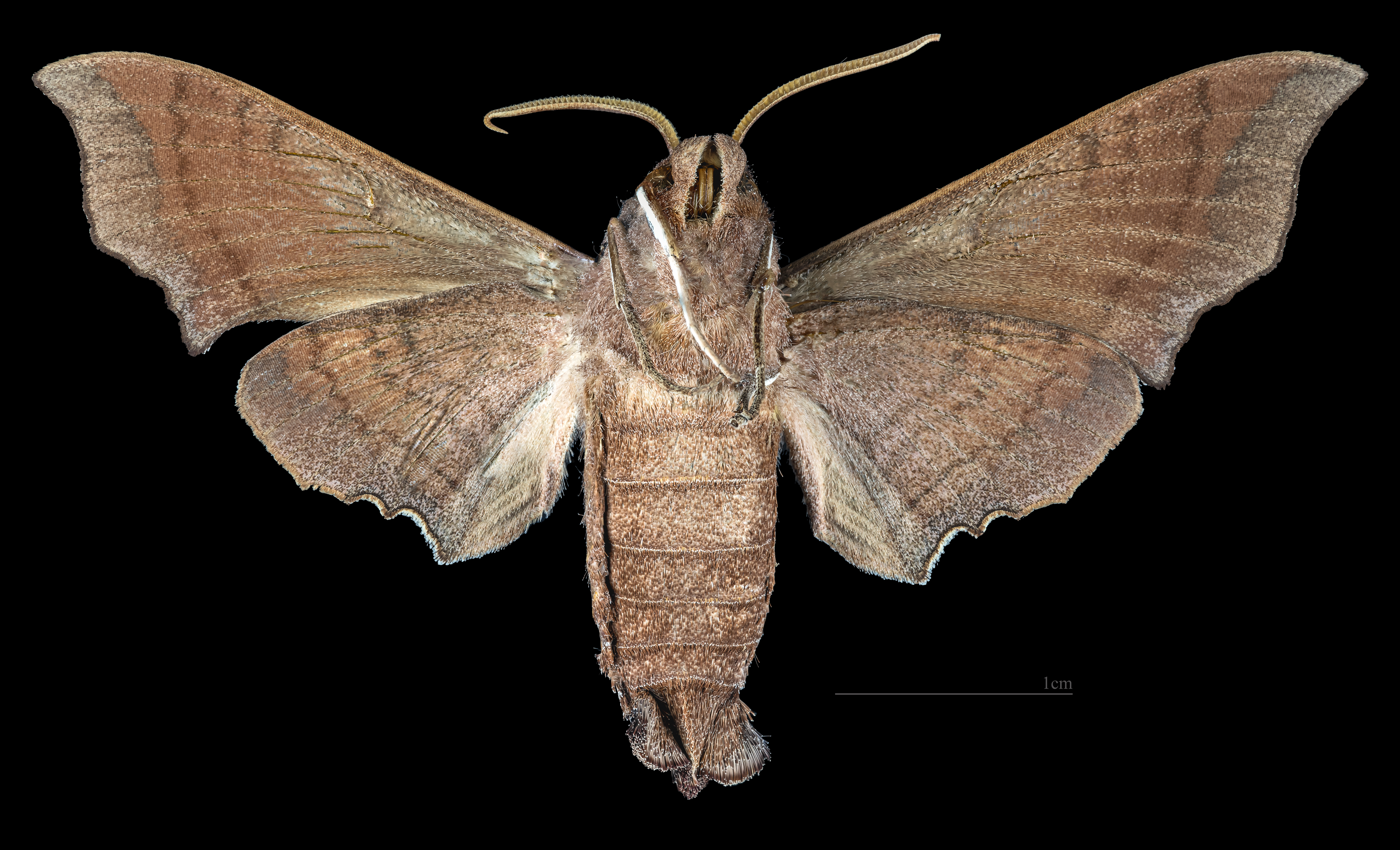
- Male ventral

Scientific classification
- Domain: Eukaryota
- Kingdom: Animalia
- Phylum: Arthropoda
- Class: Insecta
- Order: Lepidoptera
- Family: Sphingidae
- Genus: Perigonia
- Species: P. leucopus

Binomial name
- Perigonia leucopus Rothschild & Jordan, 1910

= Perigonia leucopus =

Species of moth

Perigonia leucopus is a moth of the family Sphingidae. It is known from Brazil.

The forewing upperside similar to Perigonia stulta, but the base and postmedian area are shaded with grey and there is a conspicuous lunate patch on the outer margin. There is a brown marginal band on the hindwing upperside. There is a tornal patch that is paler than the rest of the wing on the hindwing underside.
