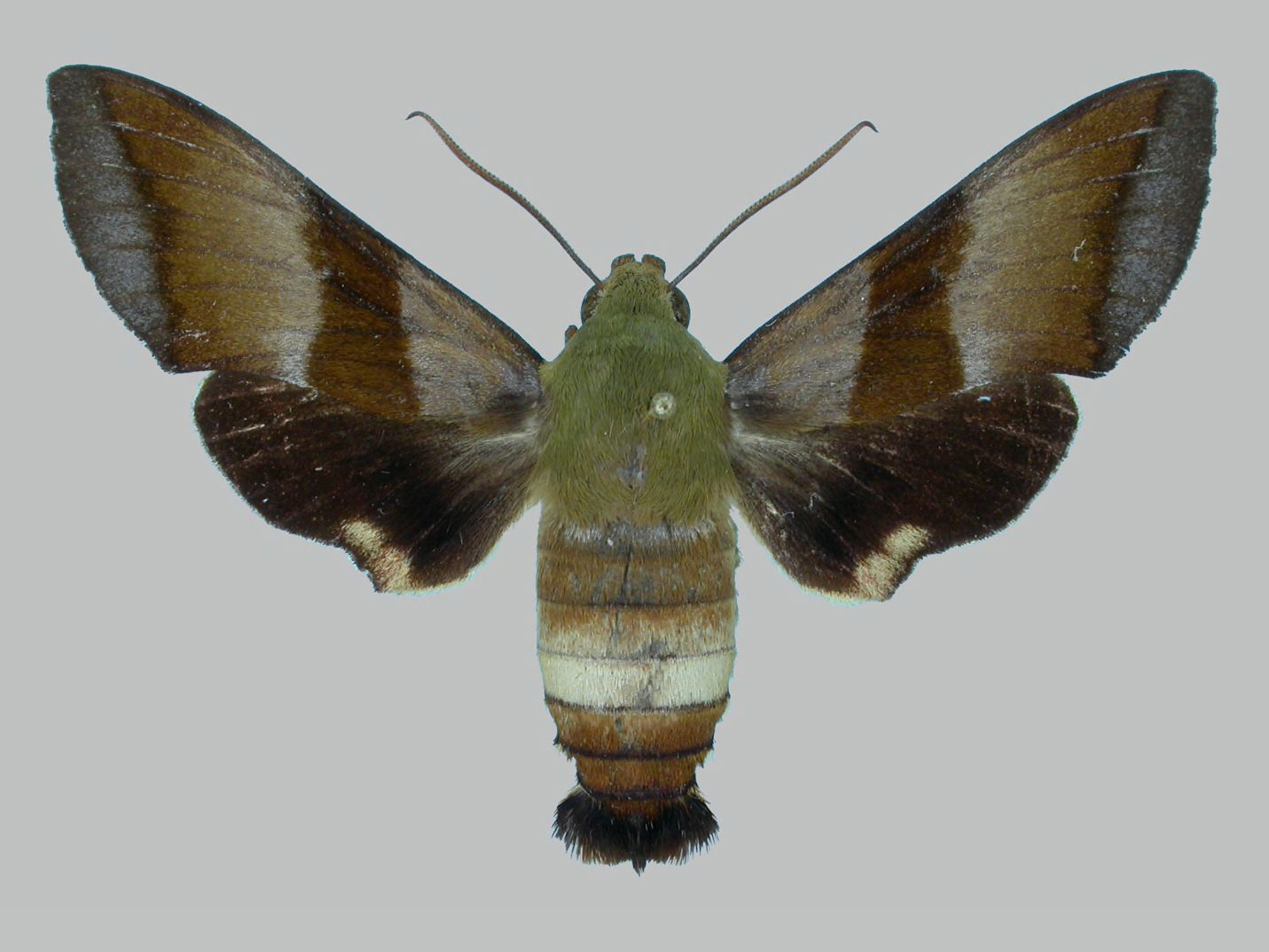
- Female, upperside

Scientific classification
- Kingdom: Animalia
- Phylum: Arthropoda
- Clade: Pancrustacea
- Class: Insecta
- Order: Lepidoptera
- Family: Sphingidae
- Genus: Perigonia
- Species: P. glaucescens

Binomial name
- Perigonia glaucescens Walker, 1856

= Perigonia glaucescens =

Species of moth

Perigonia glaucescens is a moth of the family Sphingidae. It is known from the Dominican Republic and Haiti.
