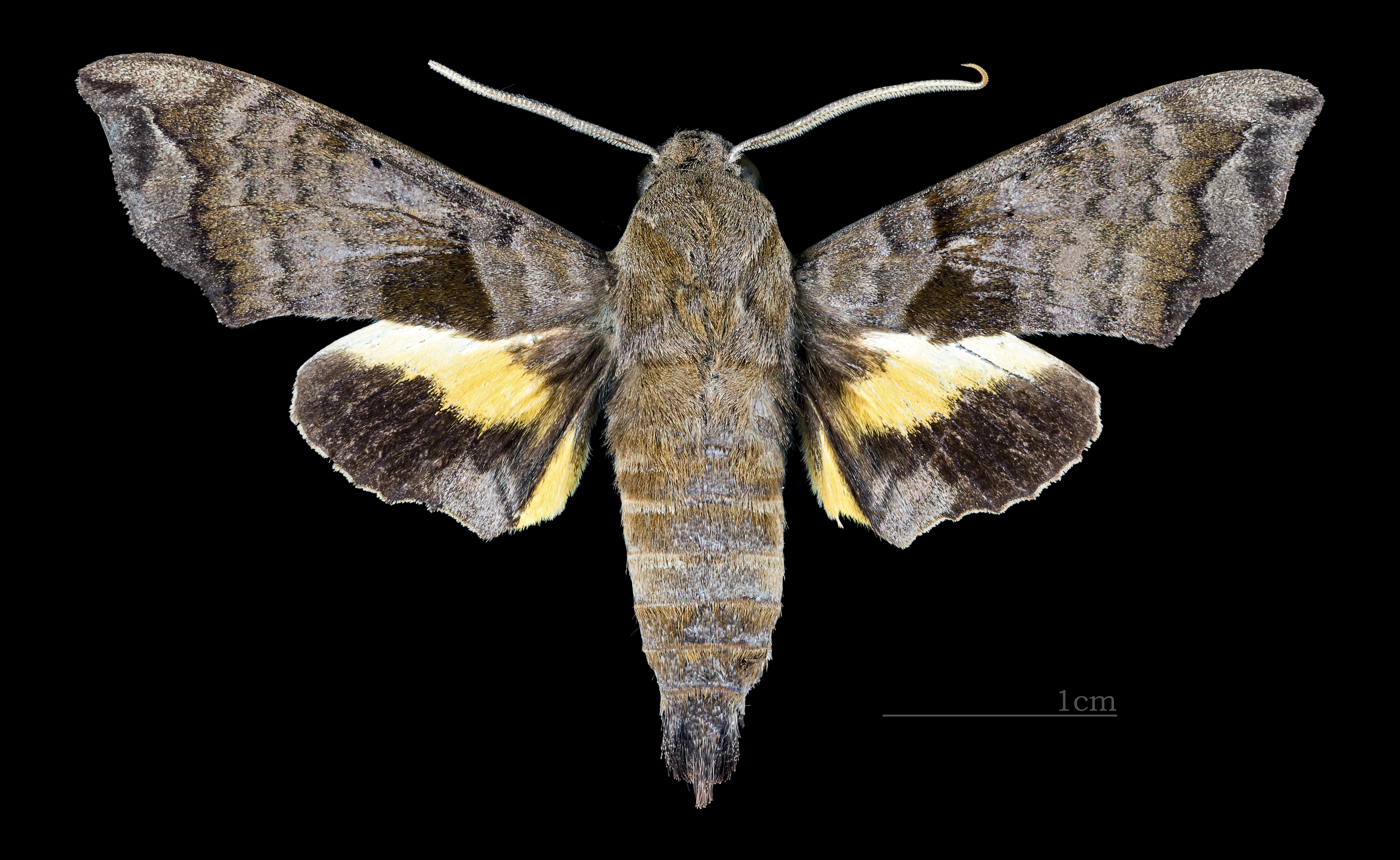
- Male dorsal view
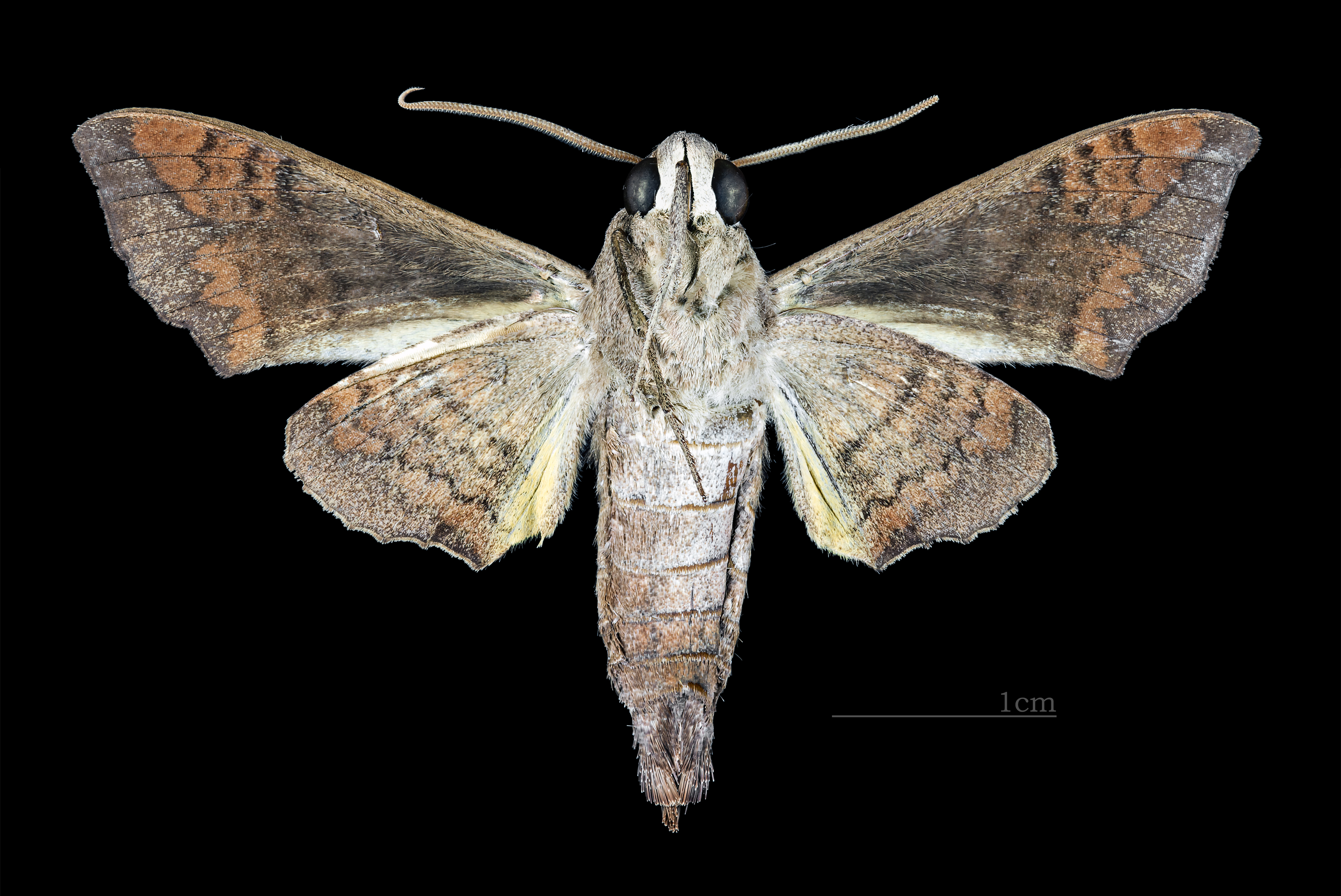
- Male ventral view

Scientific classification
- Domain: Eukaryota
- Kingdom: Animalia
- Phylum: Arthropoda
- Class: Insecta
- Order: Lepidoptera
- Family: Sphingidae
- Genus: Perigonia
- Species: P. ilus

Binomial name
- Perigonia ilus Boisduval, 1870

= Perigonia ilus =

Species of moth

Perigonia ilus is a moth of the family Sphingidae first described by Jean Baptiste Boisduval in 1870.

== Distribution ==
It is known from Mexico, Honduras, Costa Rica, Belize, Guatemala, El Salvador, Nicaragua, Panama, Colombia, Venezuela, Ecuador, Peru, Bolivia, Argentina, Paraguay, Brazil and Uruguay.

== Description ==
The wingspan is 54–58 mm. It is similar to Perigonia lusca lusca.

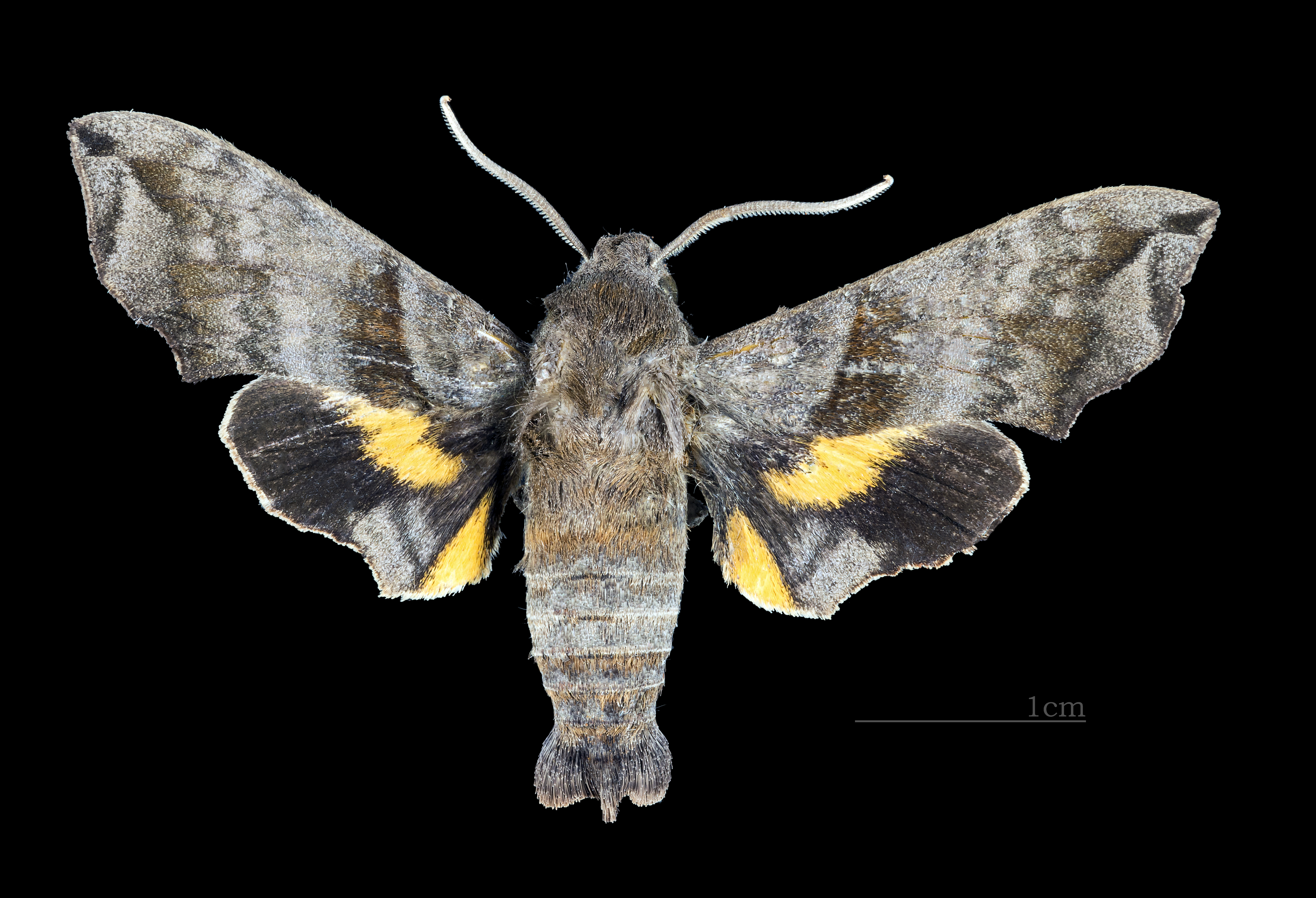
Female dorsal view

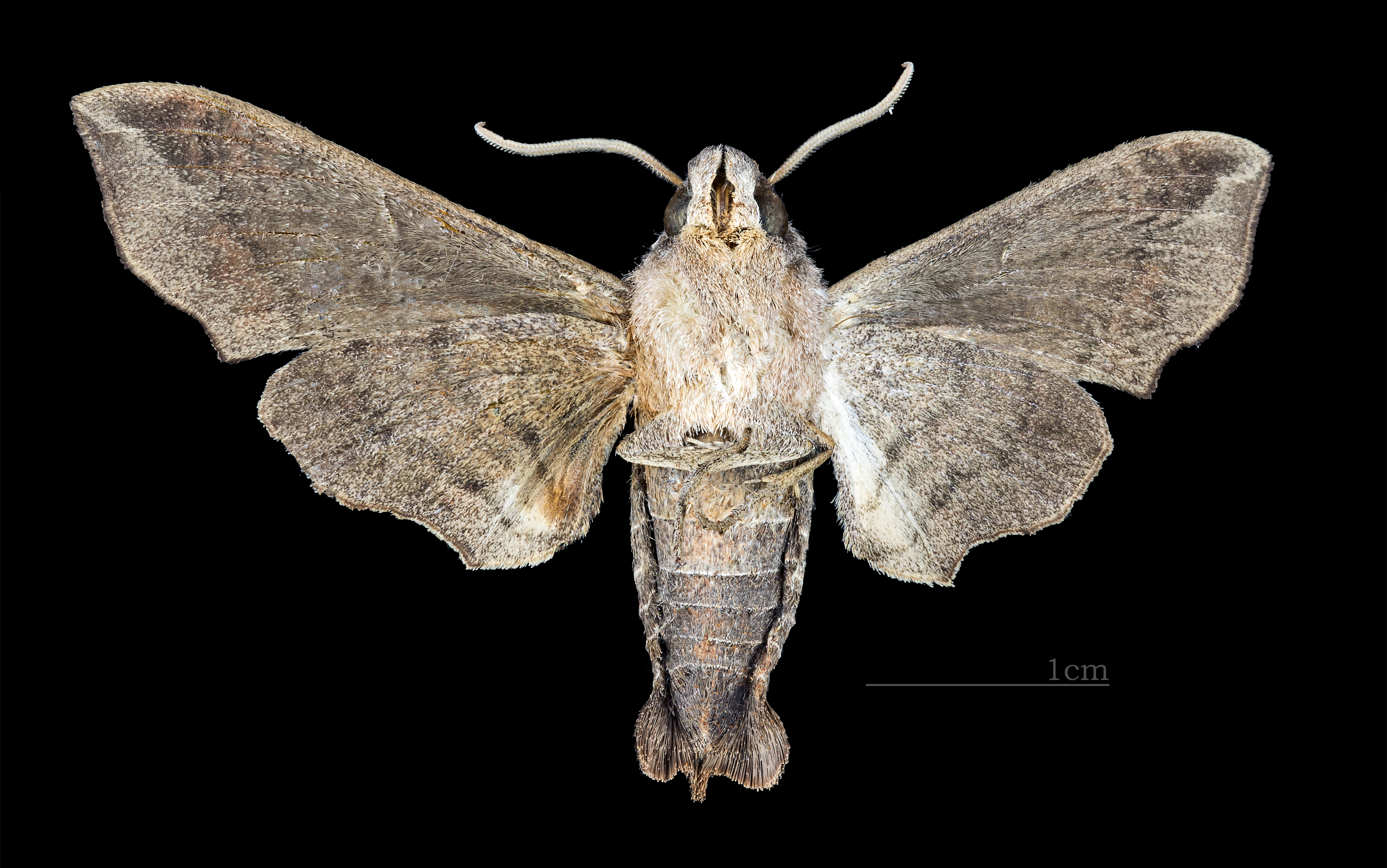
Female ventral view

== Biology ==
Adults are on wing year round.

The larvae have been recorded feeding on Calycophyllum candidissimum, Guettarda macrosperma and Ilex paraguariensis. They are green with a yellow tail horn and a dark blue stripe down the back. There are several colour morphs.
