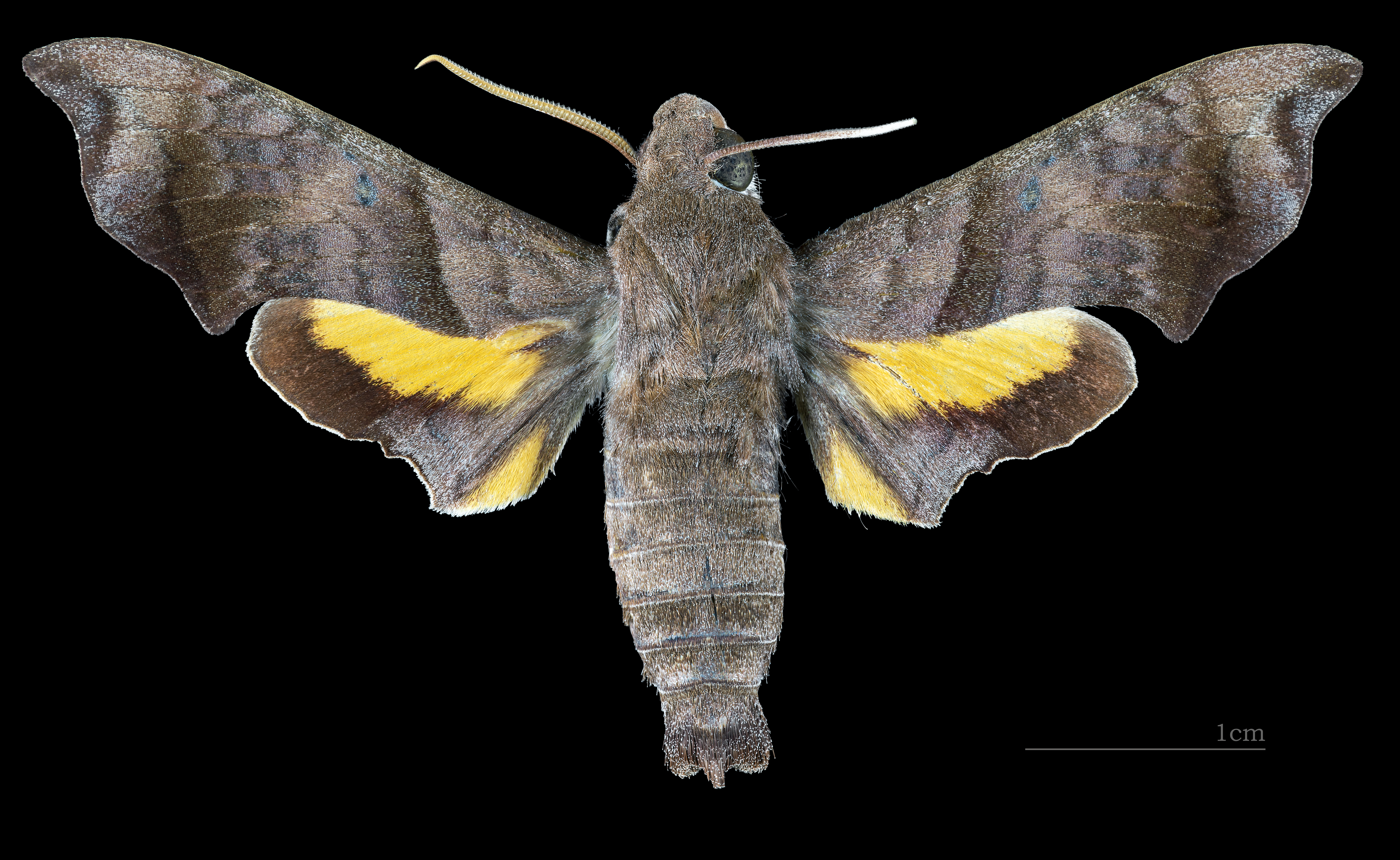
- Male dorsal
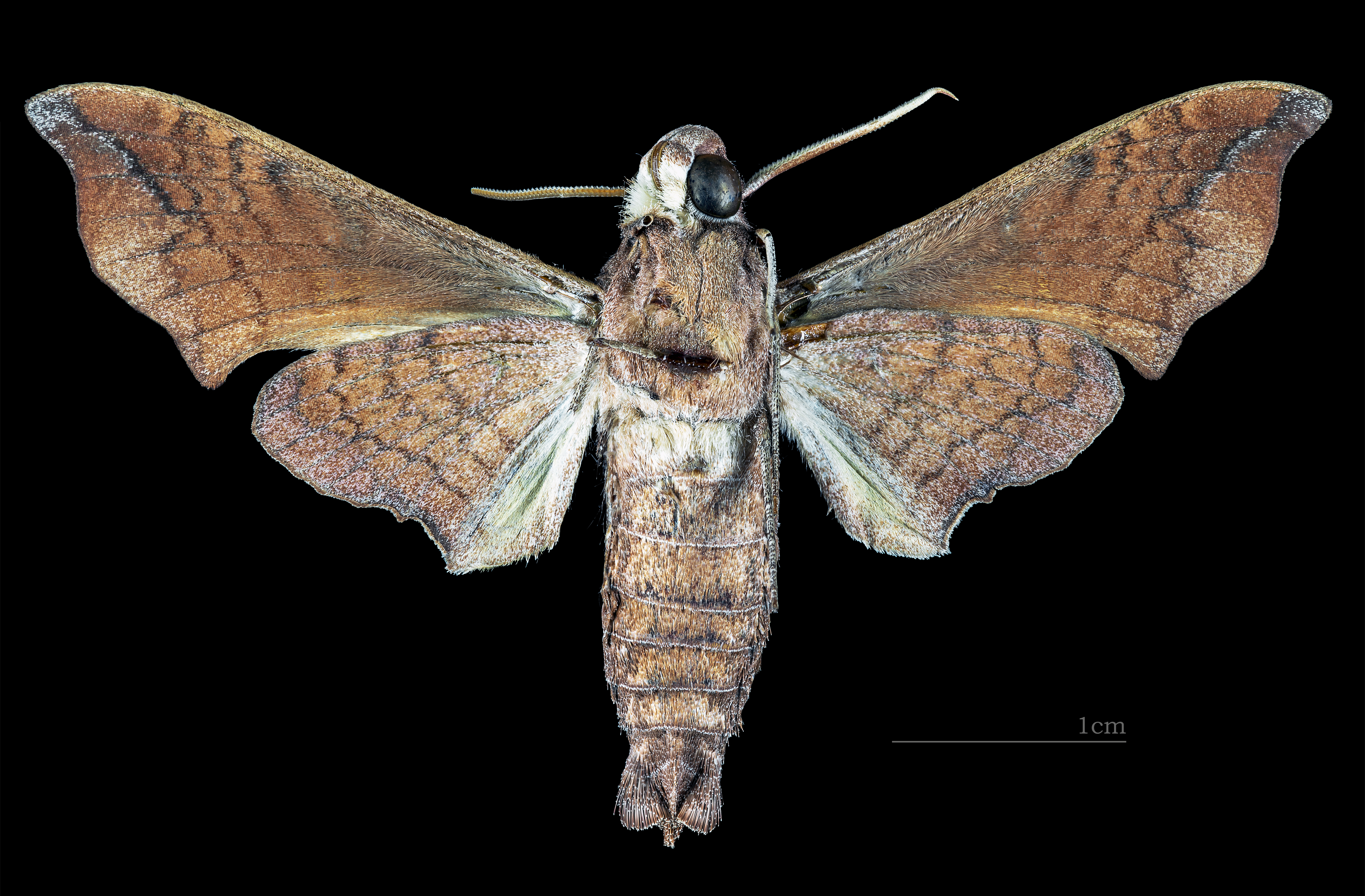
- Male ventral

Scientific classification
- Domain: Eukaryota
- Kingdom: Animalia
- Phylum: Arthropoda
- Class: Insecta
- Order: Lepidoptera
- Family: Sphingidae
- Genus: Perigonia
- Species: P. pallida

Binomial name
- Perigonia pallida Rothschild & Jordan, 1903

Synonyms
- Perigonia pallida rufescens Daniel, 1949

= Perigonia pallida =

Species of moth

Perigonia pallida is a moth of the family Sphingidae first described by Walter Rothschild and Karl Jordan in 1903.

== Distribution ==
It is known from Venezuela, Paraguay, Bolivia, Argentina and Brazil.

== Description ==
It is similar to Perigonia stulta, but generally paler and the forewings are narrower. Furthermore, the brown border on the hindwing upperside is narrower and the basal patch is deeper yellow in tint.

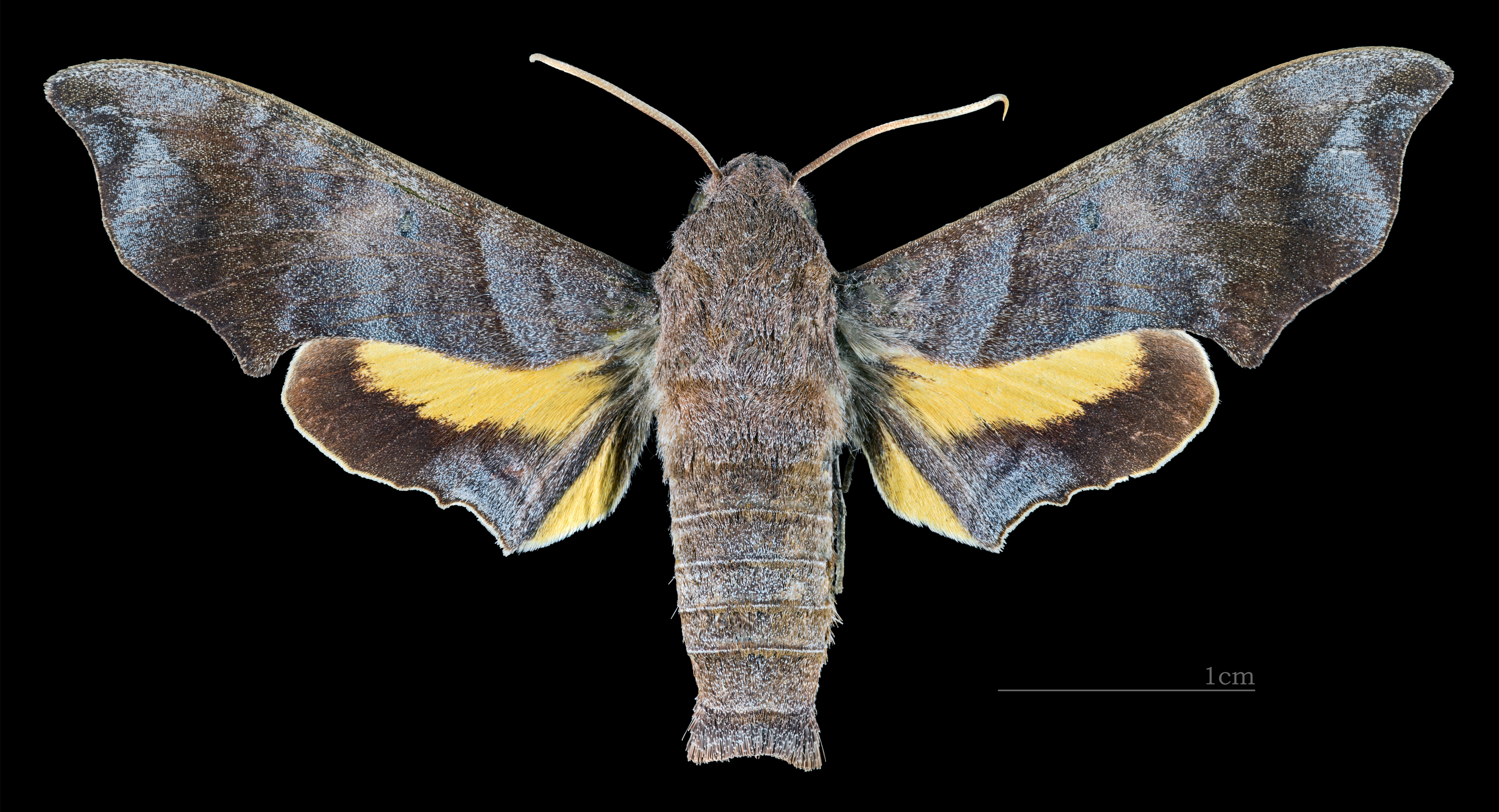
Female dorsal view

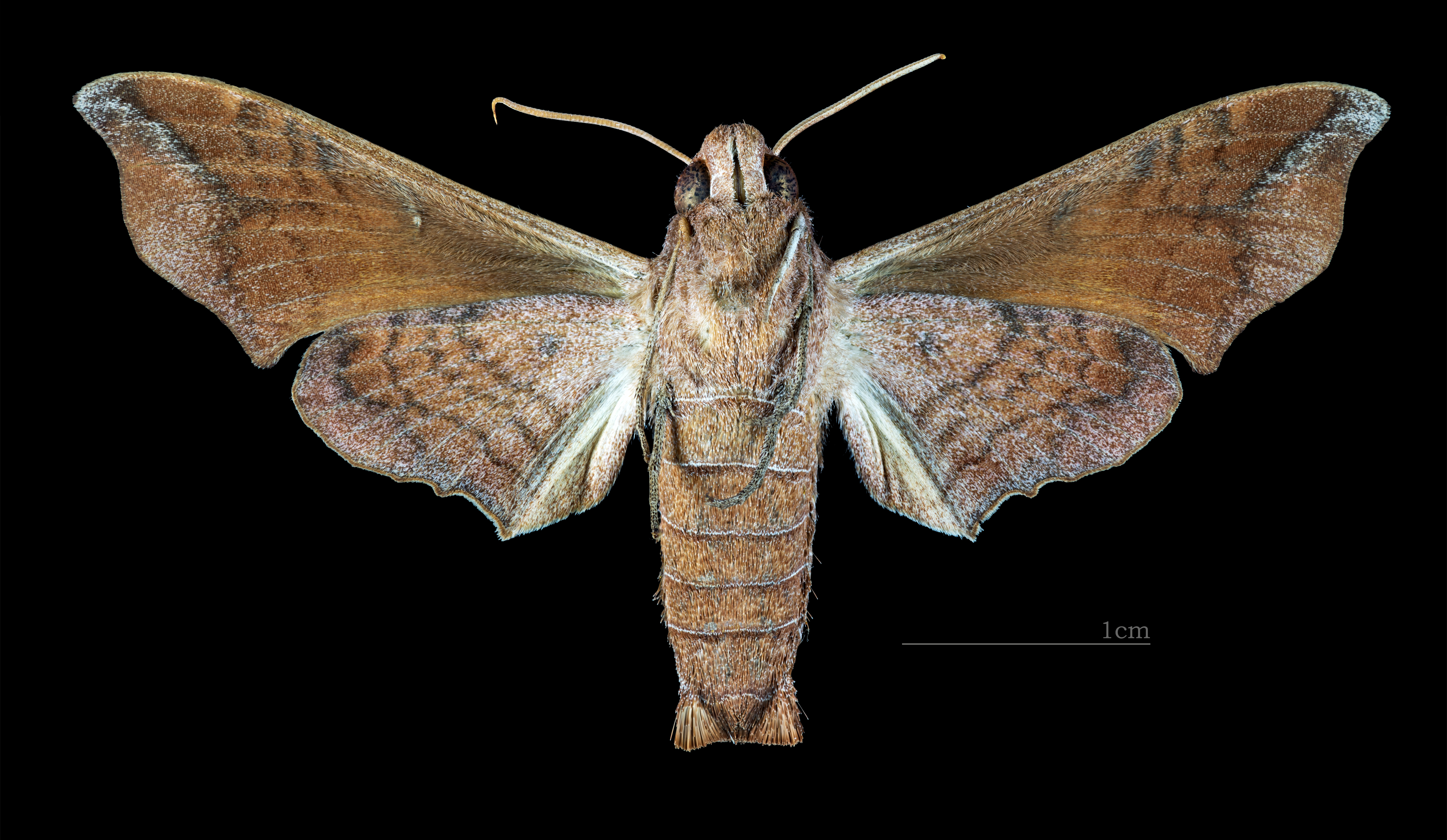
Female ventral view

== Biology ==
Adults have been recorded in November in Brazil and from November to December in Bolivia.
