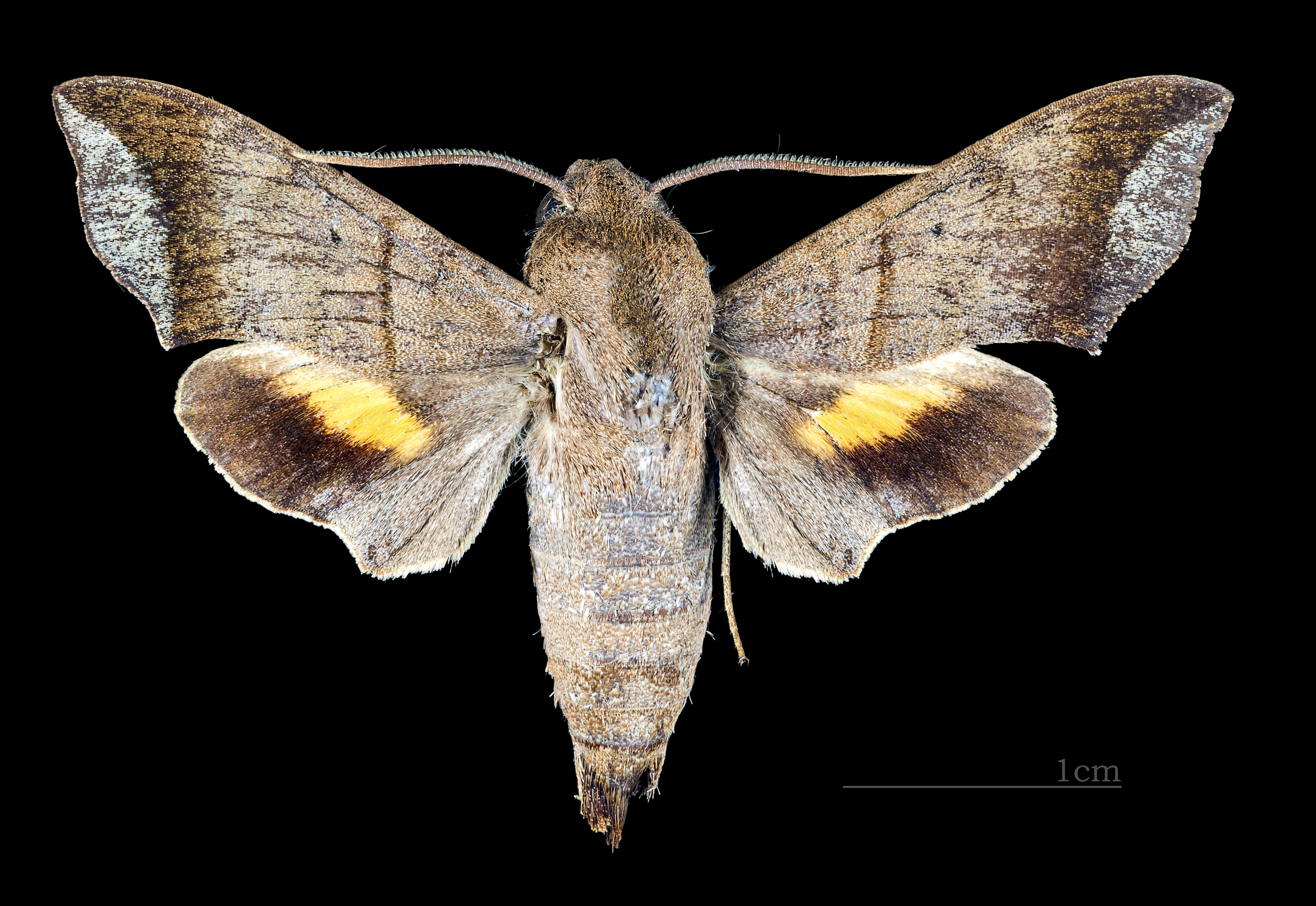
- Male dorsal
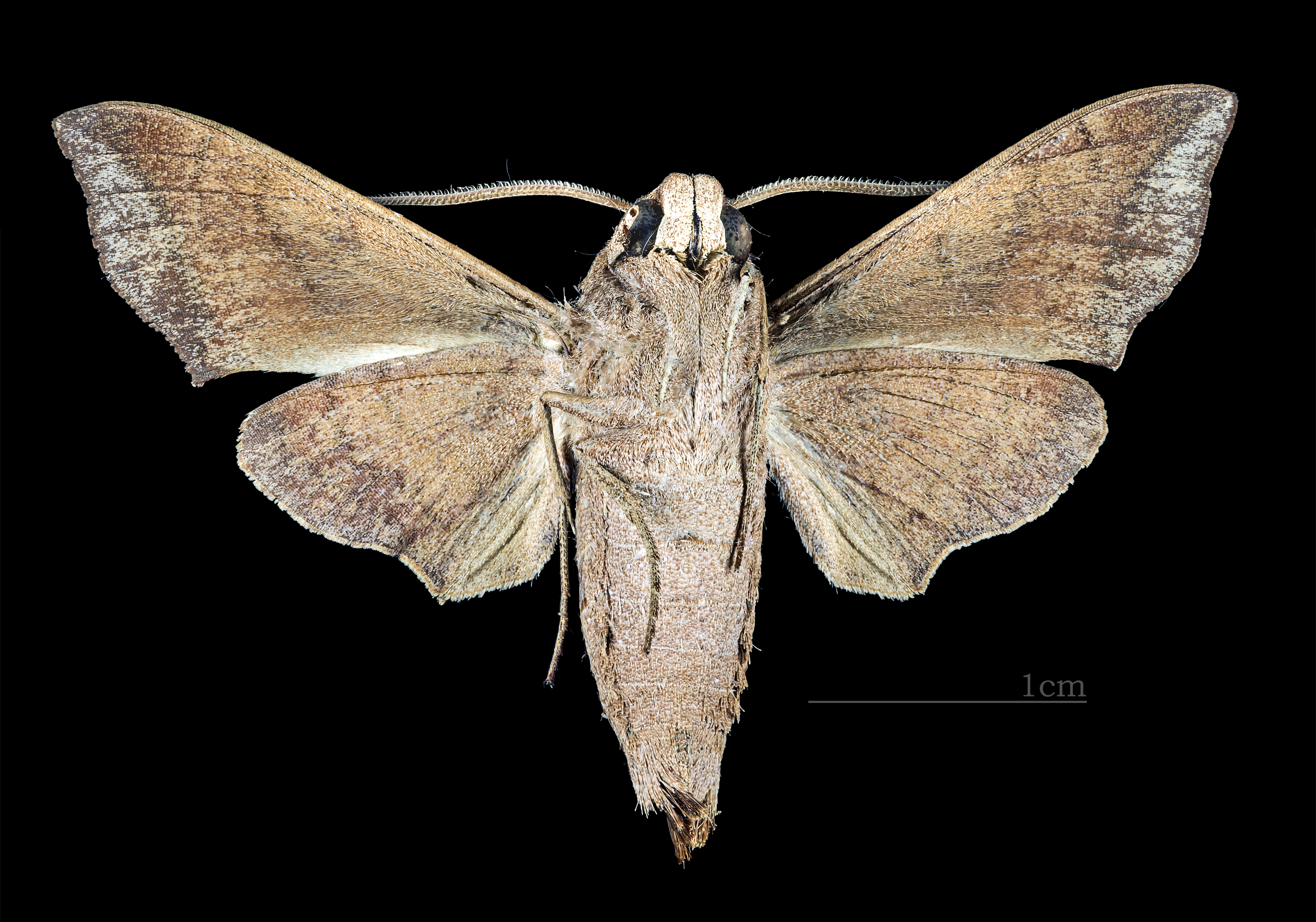
- Male ventral

Scientific classification
- Domain: Eukaryota
- Kingdom: Animalia
- Phylum: Arthropoda
- Class: Insecta
- Order: Lepidoptera
- Family: Sphingidae
- Genus: Perigonia
- Species: P. lefebvraei

Binomial name
- Perigonia lefebvraei (H. Lucas, 1857)

Synonyms
- Macroglossa lefebvraei H. Lucas, 1857; Perigonia ilioides Boisduval, 1875

= Perigonia lefebvraei =

Species of moth

Perigonia lefebvraei is a moth of the family Sphingidae first described by Hippolyte Lucas in 1857. It is known from Cuba and the Dominican Republic.

The larvae have been recorded feeding on Ferdinandusa angustata and Guettarda species.
