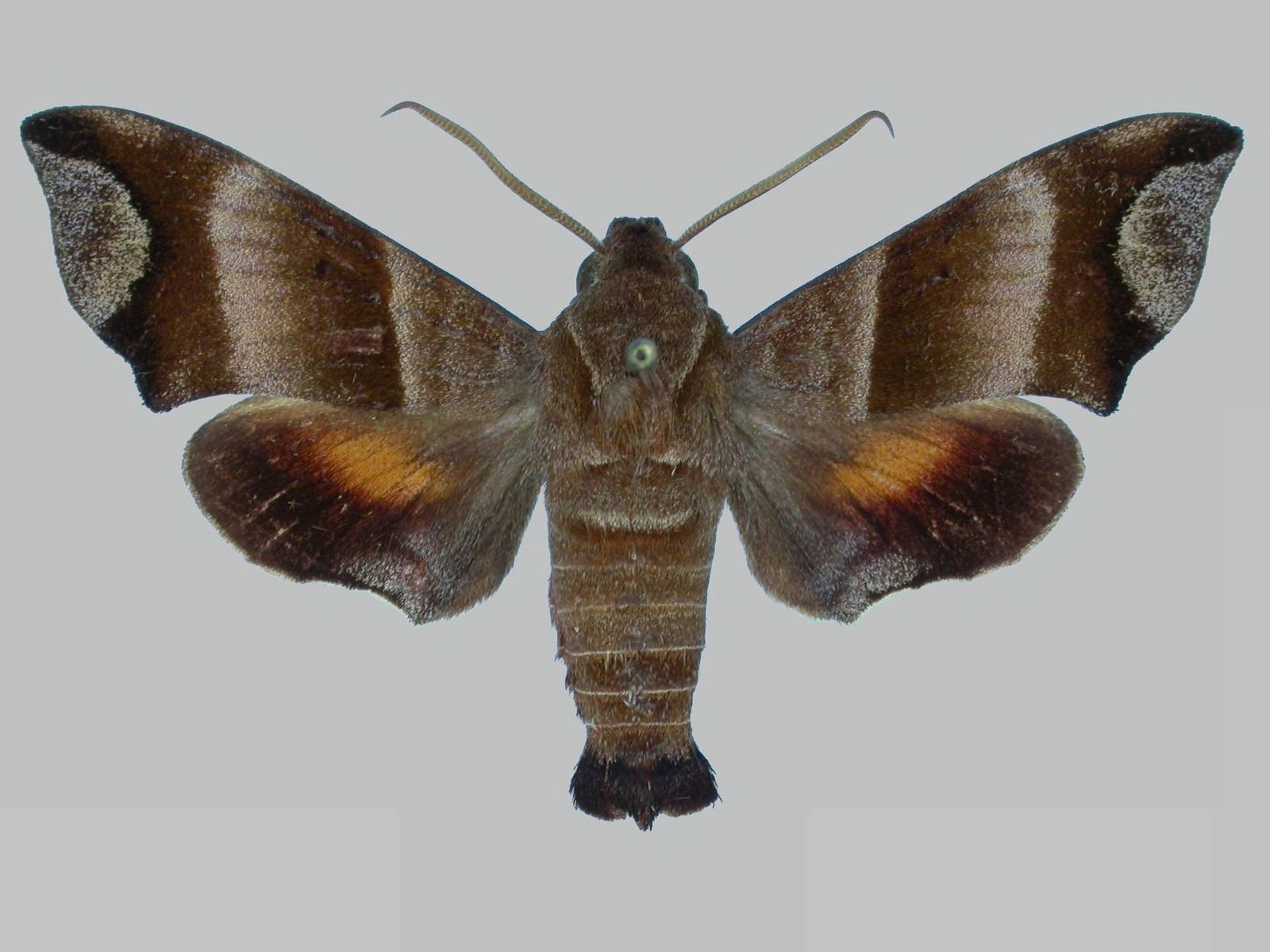

Scientific classification
- Kingdom: Animalia
- Phylum: Arthropoda
- Clade: Pancrustacea
- Class: Insecta
- Order: Lepidoptera
- Family: Sphingidae
- Genus: Perigonia
- Species: P. caryae

Binomial name
- Perigonia caryae Cadiou & Rawlins, 1998

= Perigonia caryae =

Species of moth

Perigonia caryae is a moth of the family Sphingidae. It is known from the Dominican Republic.
