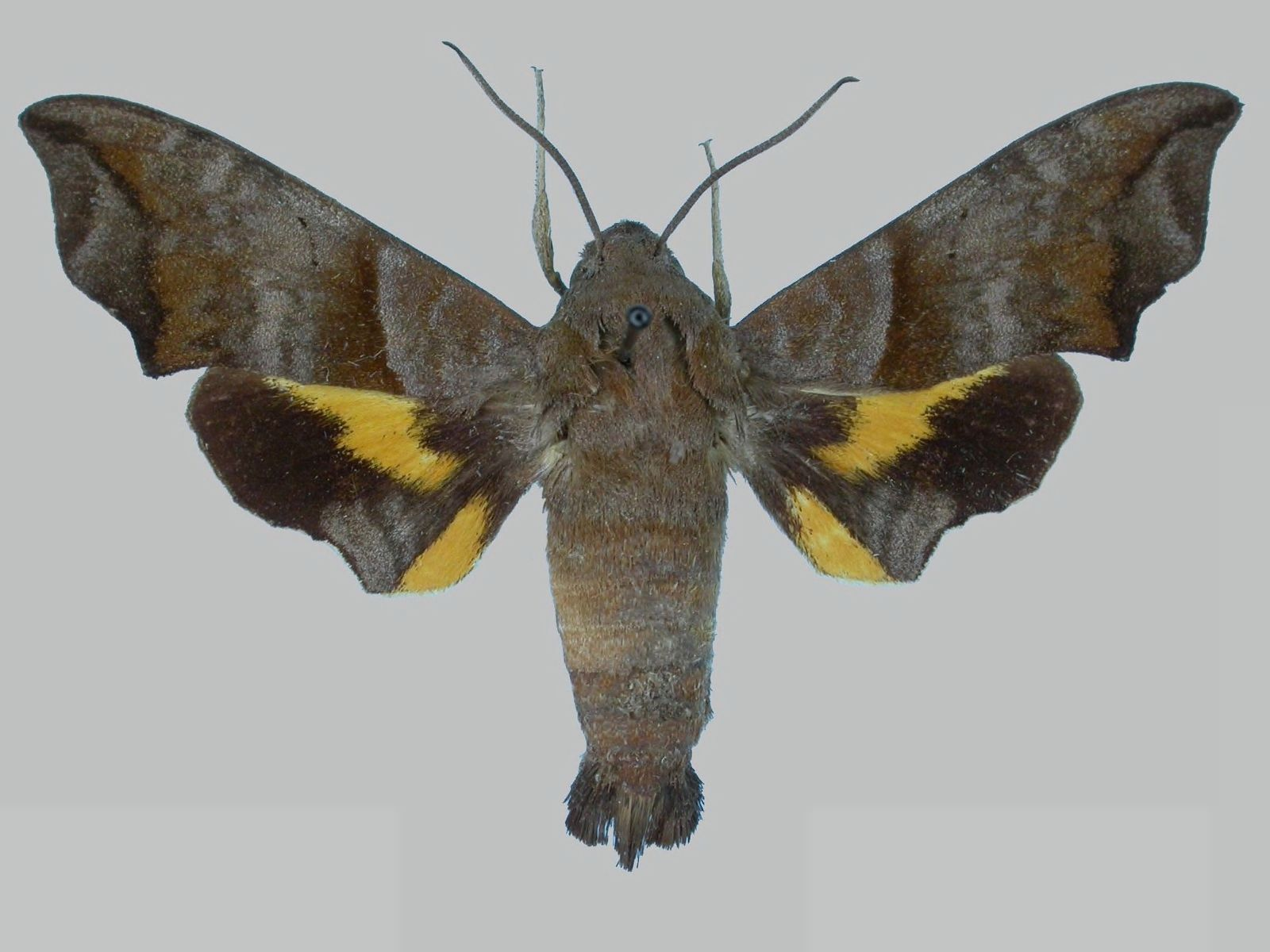

Scientific classification
- Domain: Eukaryota
- Kingdom: Animalia
- Phylum: Arthropoda
- Class: Insecta
- Order: Lepidoptera
- Family: Sphingidae
- Genus: Perigonia
- Species: P. passerina

Binomial name
- Perigonia passerina Boisduval, 1875

= Perigonia passerina =

Species of moth

Perigonia passerina is a moth of the family Sphingidae. It is known from Bolivia, Argentina and Brazil.

It is similar to Perigonia lusca lusca, but the median part of the forewing outer margin is more convex. The forewing upperside ground colour is more grey. Furthermore, the yellow patch along the inner margin of the hindwing upperside is much larger and the tornal patch on the hindwing underside is buff.

Adults have been recorded in July and December in Bolivia, suggesting there are two generations per year.
