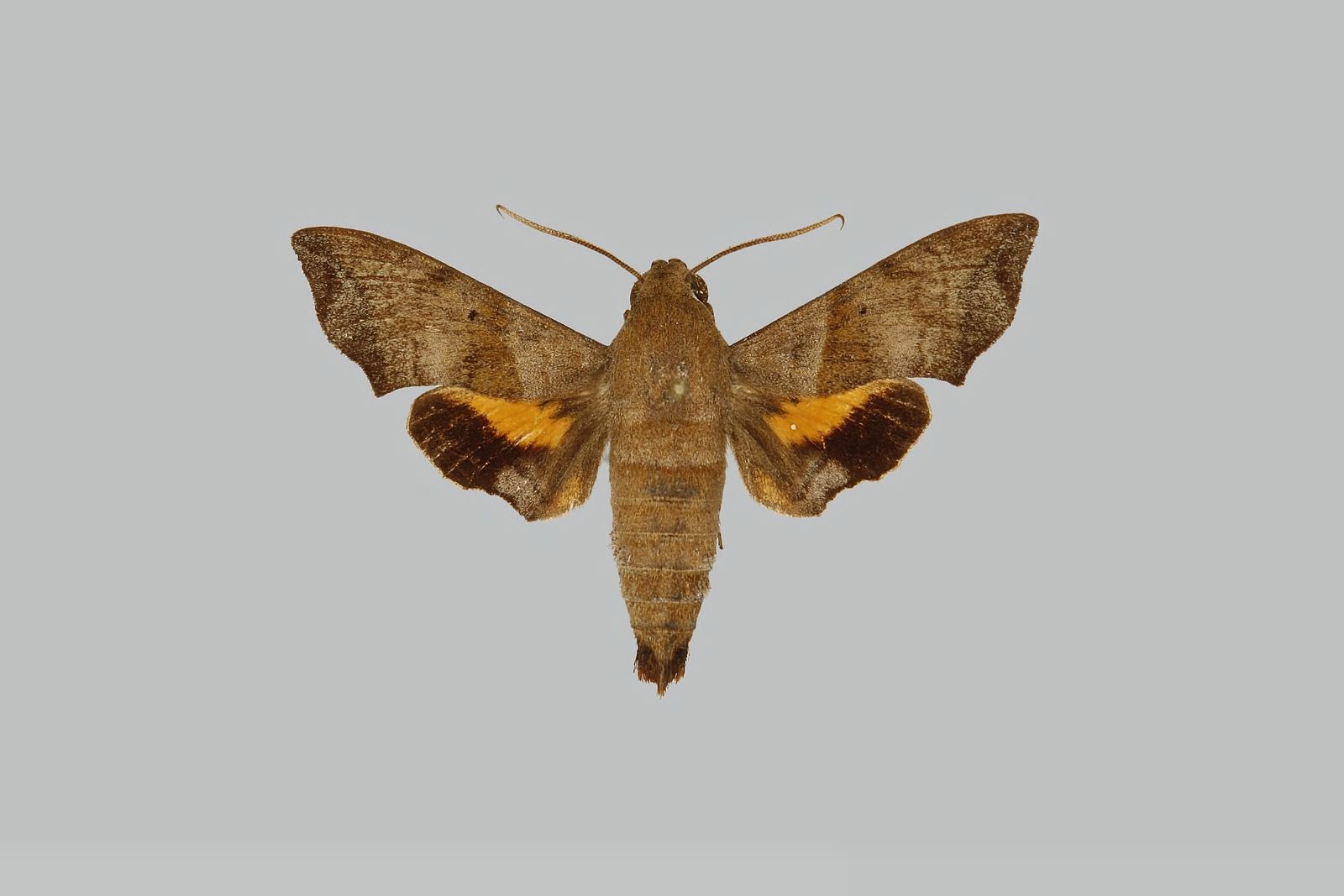

Scientific classification
- Domain: Eukaryota
- Kingdom: Animalia
- Phylum: Arthropoda
- Class: Insecta
- Order: Lepidoptera
- Family: Sphingidae
- Genus: Perigonia
- Species: P. manni

Binomial name
- Perigonia manni Clark, 1935

= Perigonia manni =

Species of moth

Perigonia manni is a moth of the family Sphingidae. It is known from Haiti.
