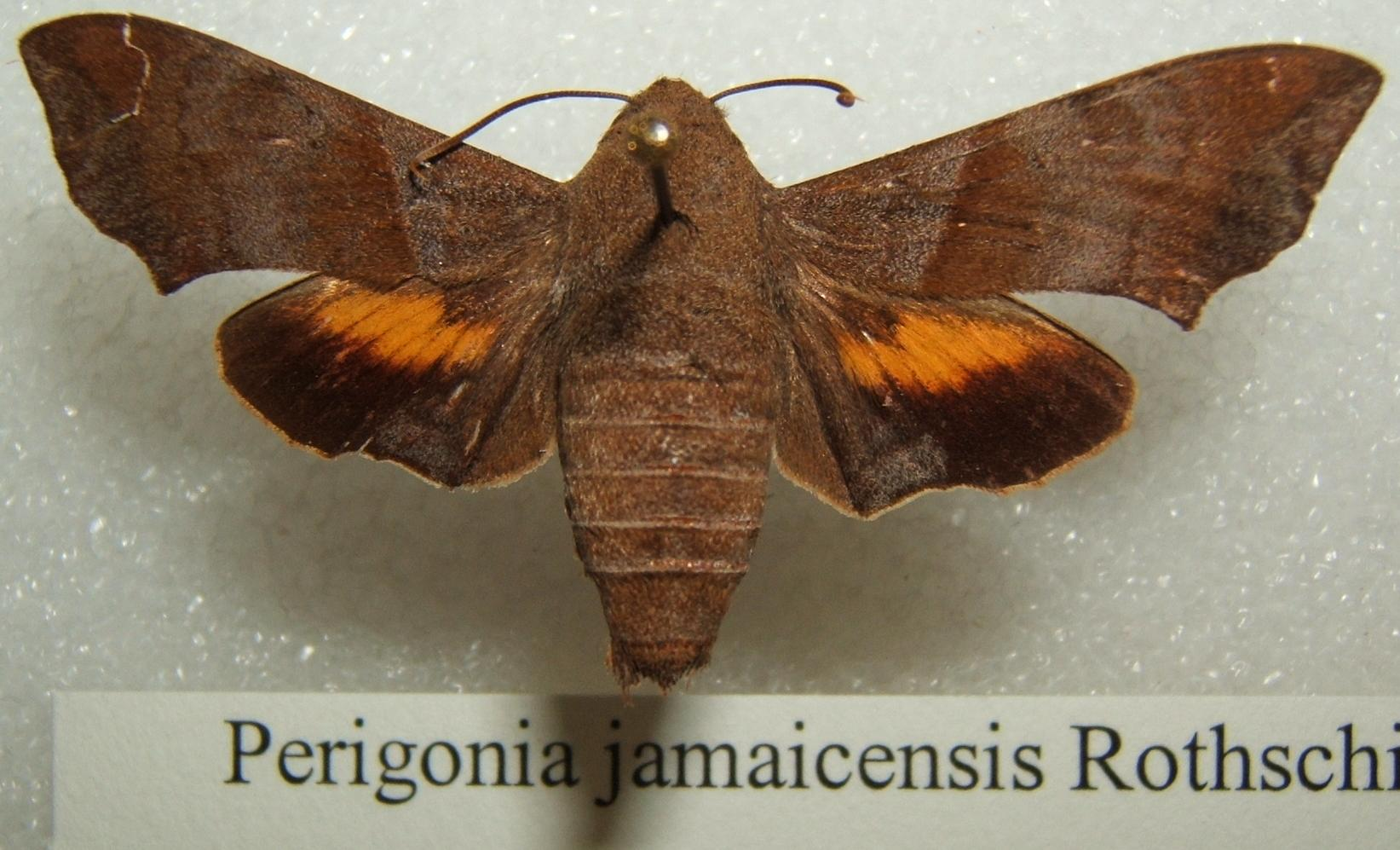
- Perigonia jamaicensis, adult

Scientific classification
- Domain: Eukaryota
- Kingdom: Animalia
- Phylum: Arthropoda
- Class: Insecta
- Order: Lepidoptera
- Family: Sphingidae
- Genus: Perigonia
- Species: P. jamaicensis

Binomial name
- Perigonia jamaicensis Rothschild, 1894

= Perigonia jamaicensis =

Species of moth

Perigonia jamaicensis is a moth of the family Sphingidae. It lives in Jamaica.
