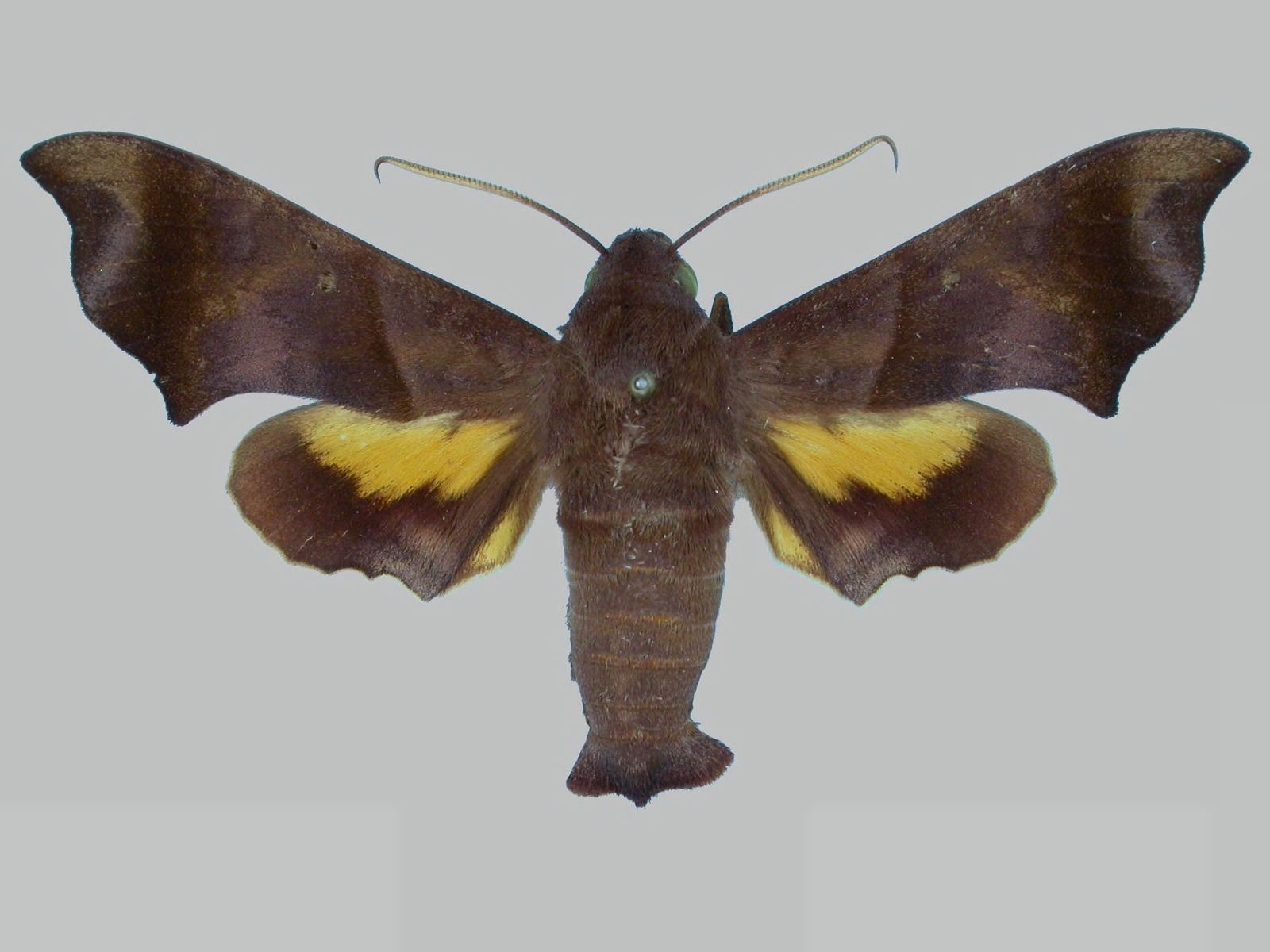
- Male, upperside. Venezuela

Scientific classification
- Domain: Eukaryota
- Kingdom: Animalia
- Phylum: Arthropoda
- Class: Insecta
- Order: Lepidoptera
- Family: Sphingidae
- Genus: Perigonia
- Species: P. pittieri

Binomial name
- Perigonia pittieri Lichy, 1962

= Perigonia pittieri =

Species of moth in family Sphingdae

Perigonia pittieri is a moth of the family Sphingidae. It is known from Venezuela, French Guiana and Brazil.

The length of the forewings is 24–27 mm for males and about 29 mm for females.
