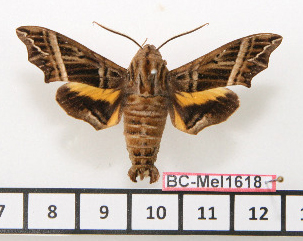

Scientific classification
- Kingdom: Animalia
- Phylum: Arthropoda
- Class: Insecta
- Order: Lepidoptera
- Family: Sphingidae
- Genus: Perigonia
- Species: P. divisa

Binomial name
- Perigonia divisa Grote, 1865

= Perigonia divisa =

Species of moth

Perigonia divisa is a moth of the family Sphingidae. It is known from Cuba.
