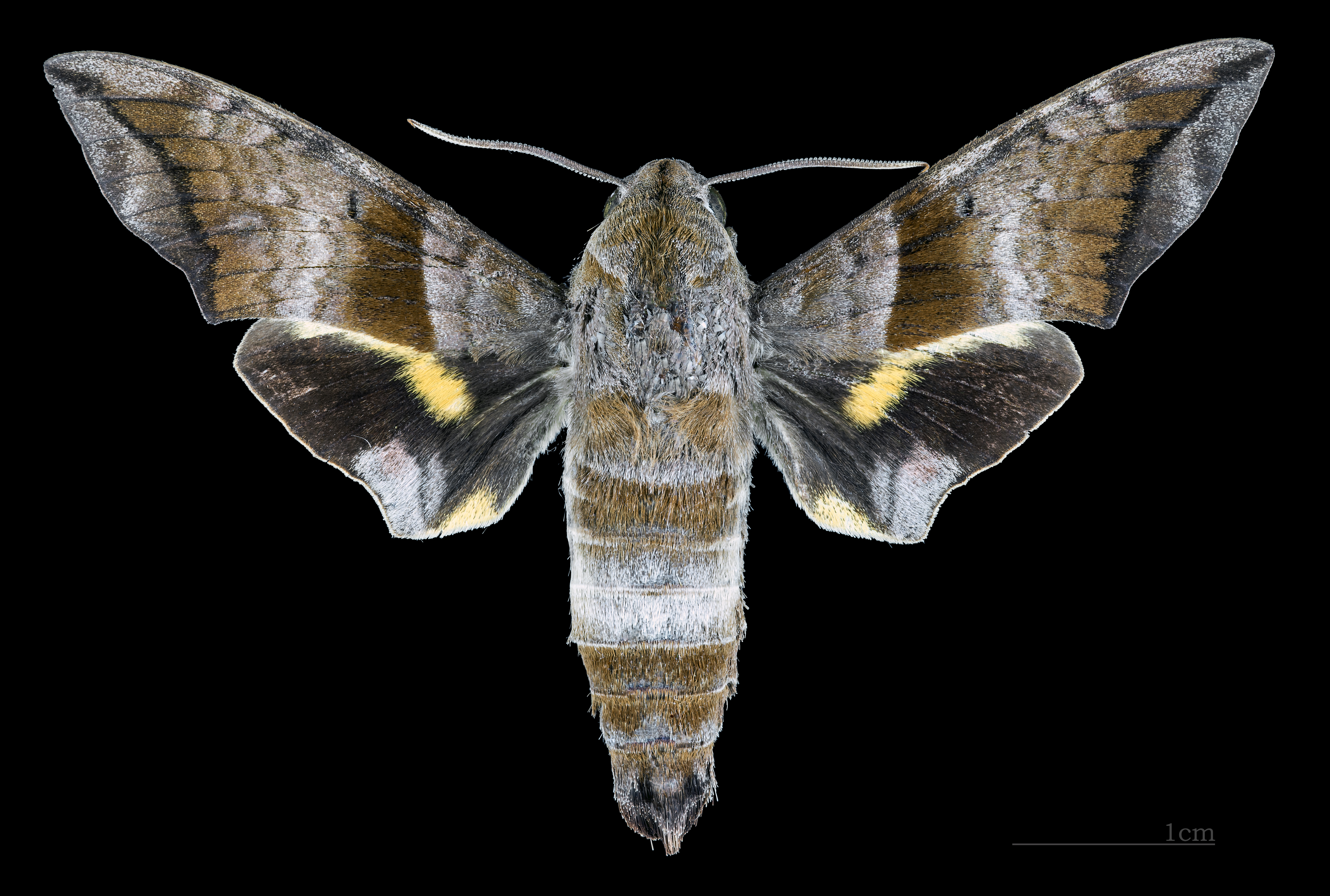
- Perigonia lusca

Scientific classification
- Domain: Eukaryota
- Kingdom: Animalia
- Phylum: Arthropoda
- Class: Insecta
- Order: Lepidoptera
- Family: Sphingidae
- Subtribe: Dilophonotina
- Genus: Perigonia; Herrich-Schäffer, 1854

Synonyms
- Perigonia Walker, 1856; Stenolophia R. Felder, 1874

= Perigonia =

Genus of moths

Perigonia is a genus of moths in the family Sphingidae.

== Species ==
- Perigonia caryae Cadiou & Rawlins, 1998
- Perigonia divisa Grote, 1865
- Perigonia glaucescens Walker, 1856
- Perigonia grisea Rothschild & Jordan, 1903
- Perigonia ilus Boisduval, 1870
- Perigonia jamaicensis Rothschild, 1894
- Perigonia lefebvraei (H. Lucas, 1857)
- Perigonia leucopus Rothschild & Jordan, 1910
- Perigonia lusca (Fabricius, 1777)
- Perigonia manni Clark, 1935
- Perigonia pallida Rothschild & Jordan, 1903
- Perigonia passerina Boisduval, 1875
- Perigonia pittieri Lichy, 1962
- Perigonia stulta Herrich-Schäffer, 1854
- Perigonia thayeri Clark, 1928
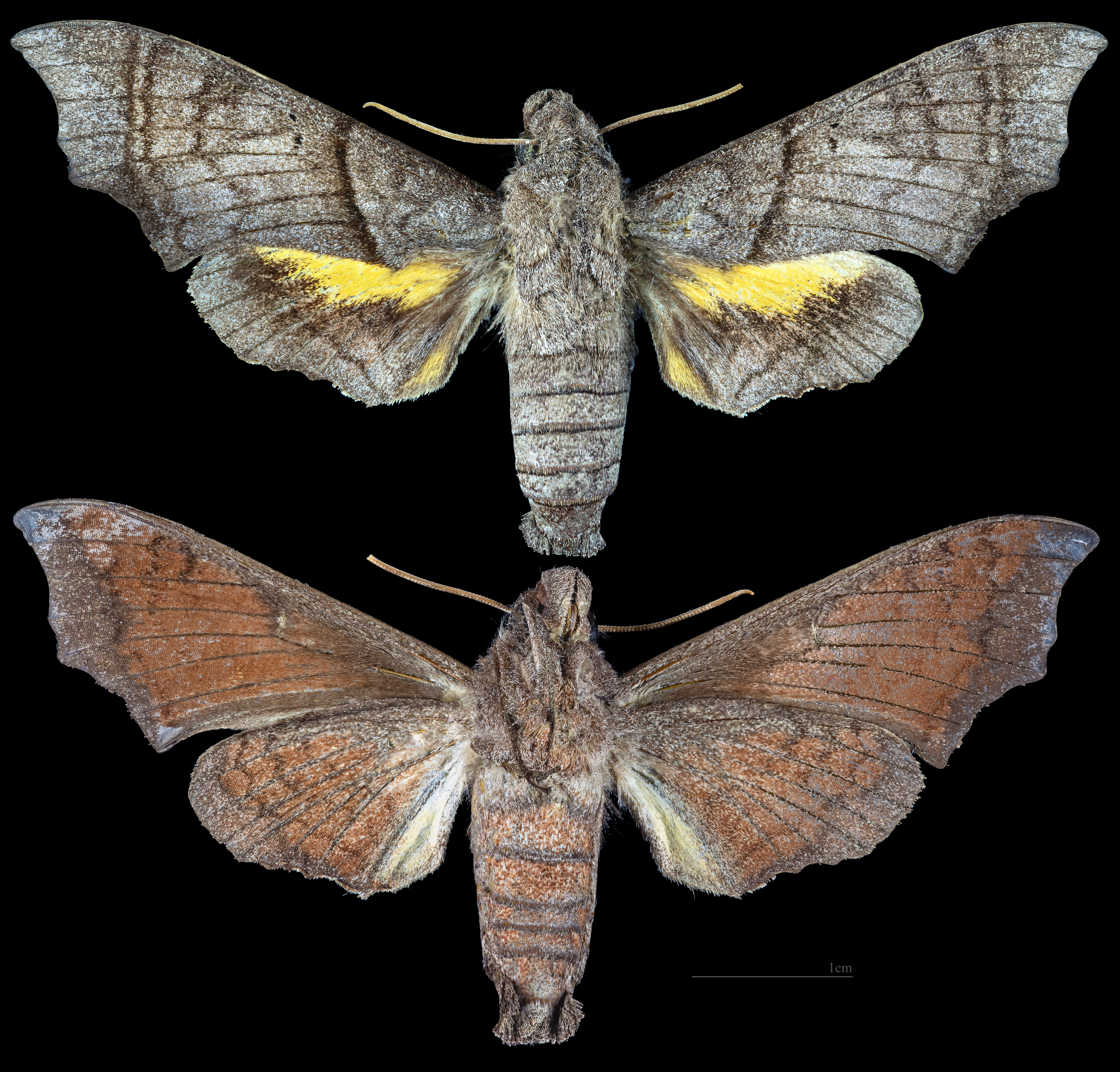
Perigonia grisea

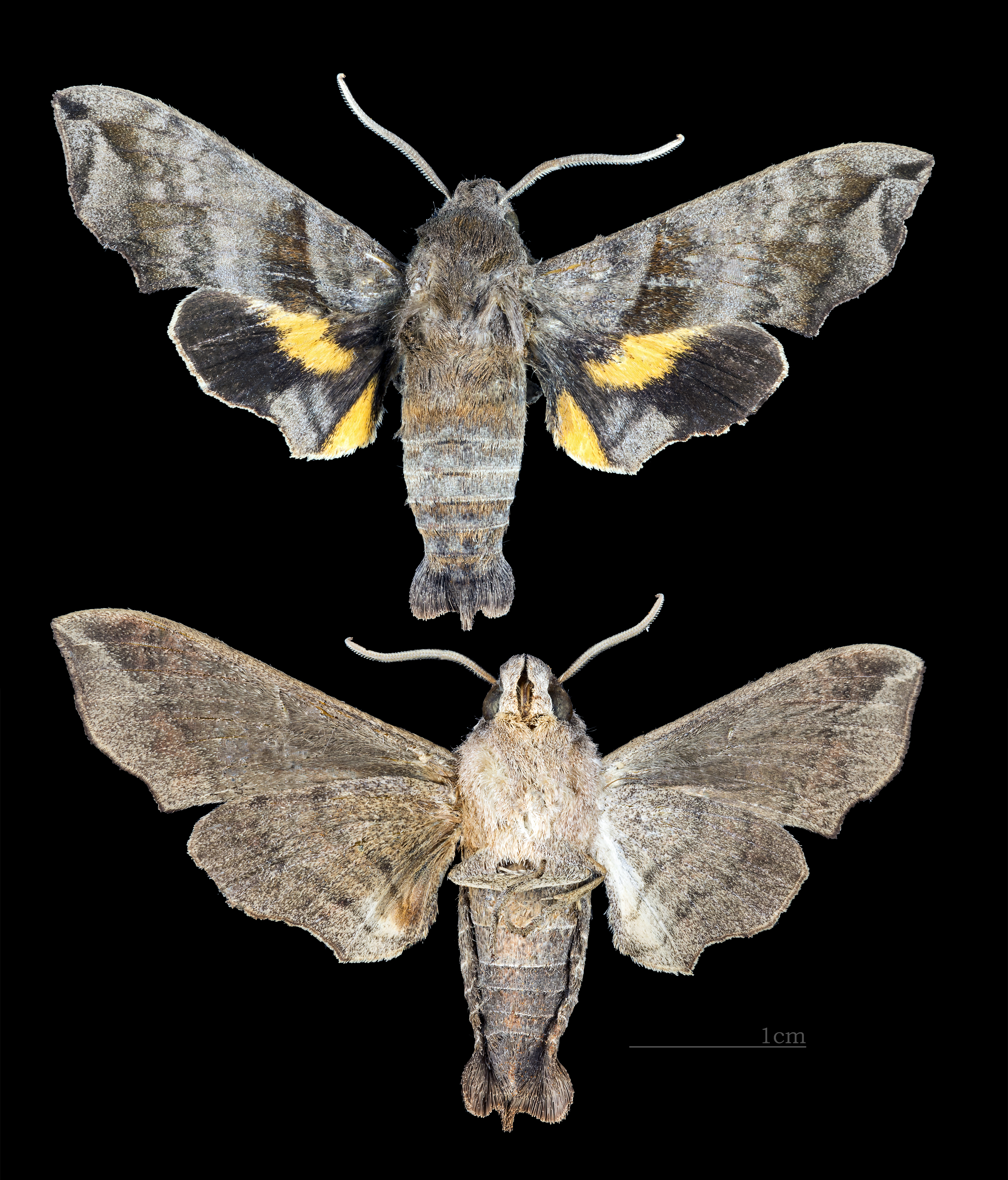
Perigonia ilus

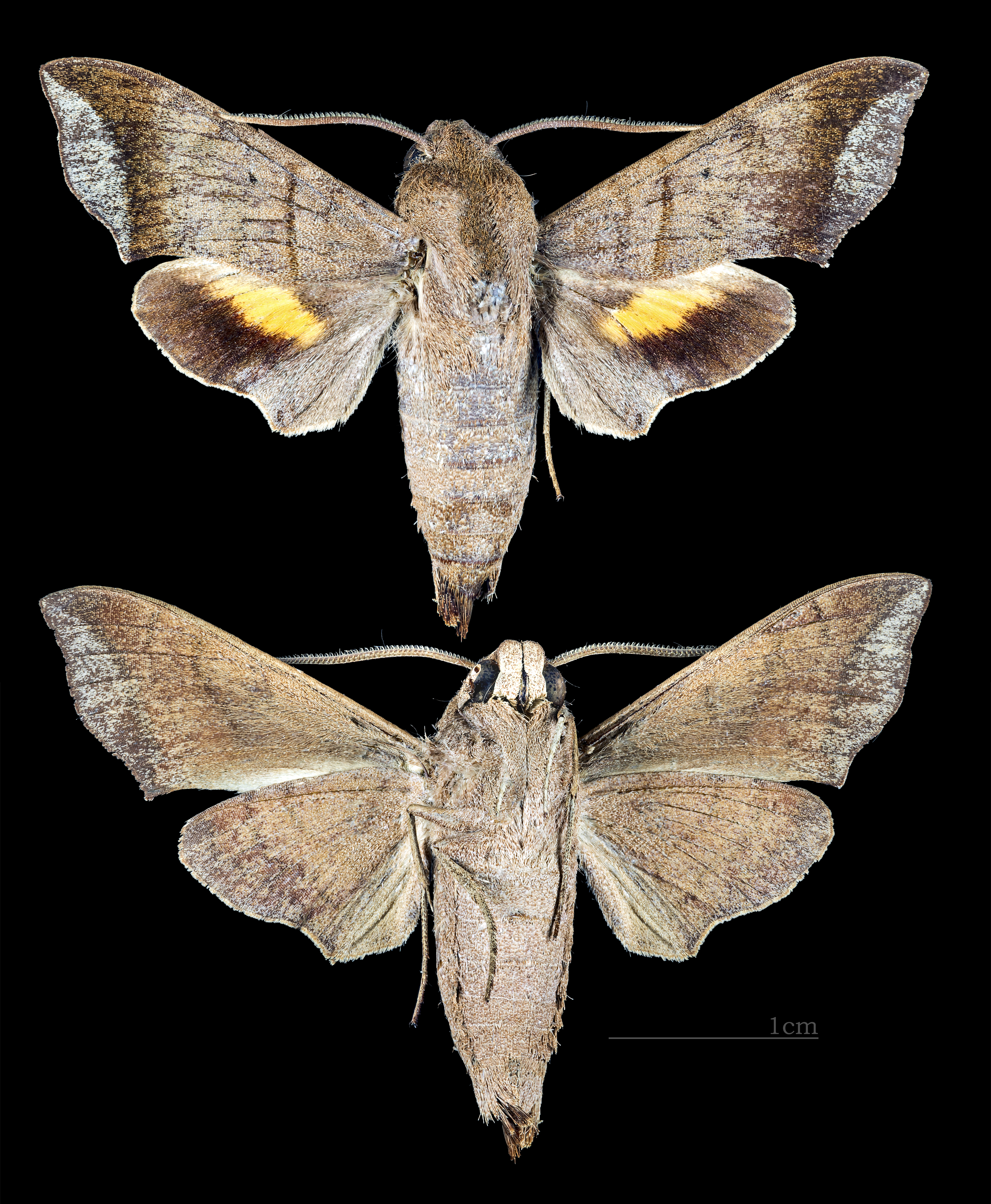
Perigonia lefebvraei

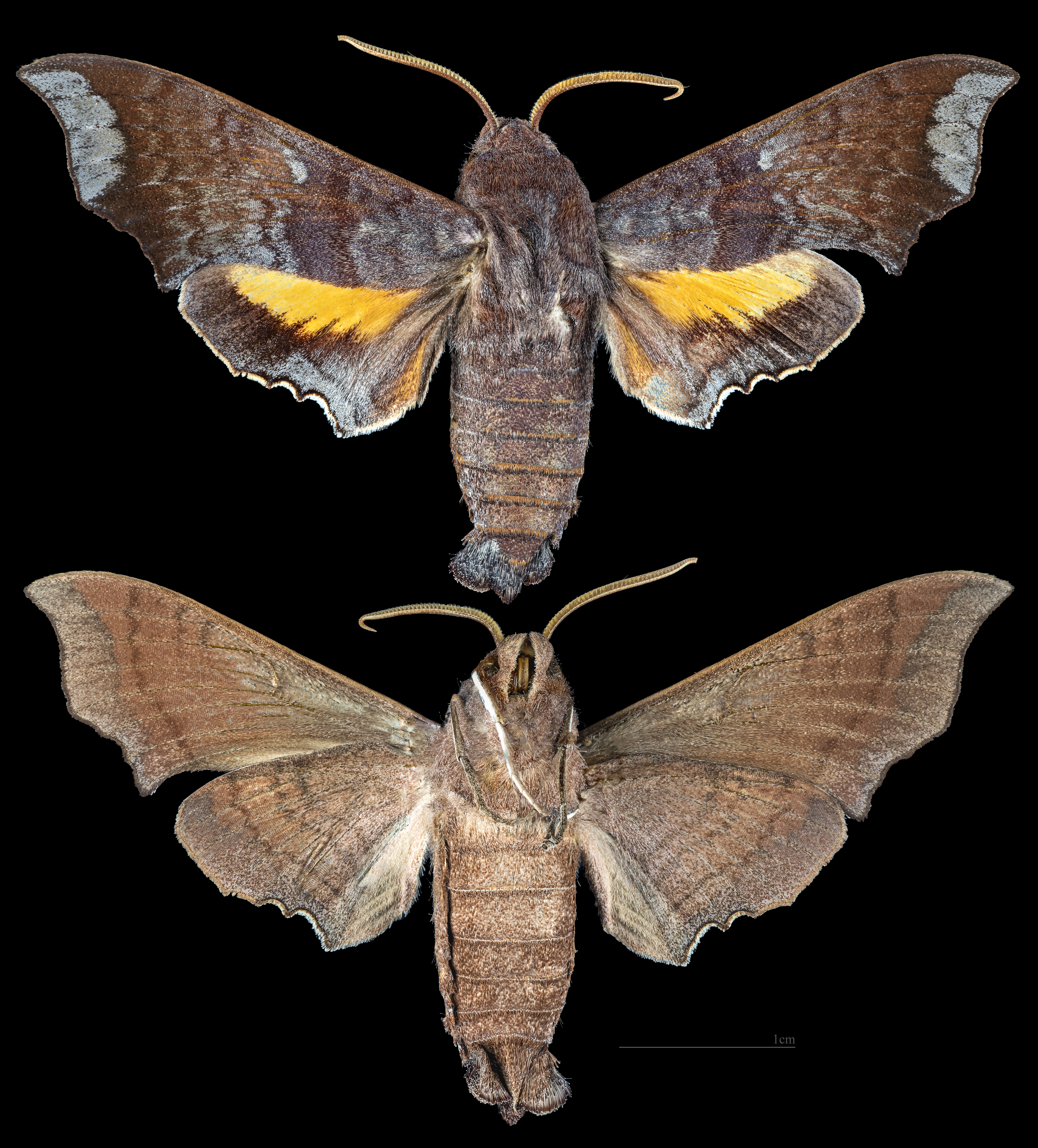
Perigonia leucopus

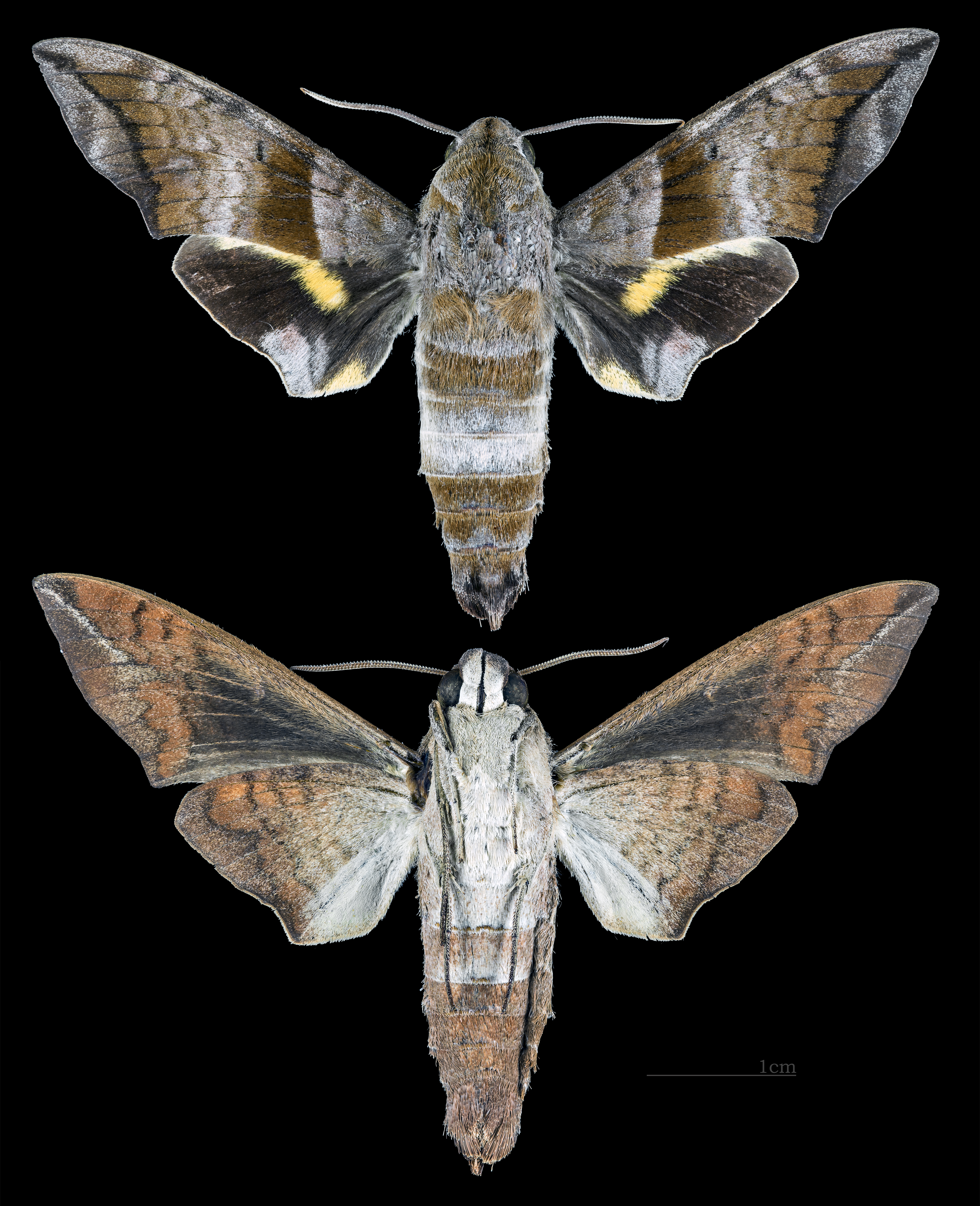
Perigonia lusca

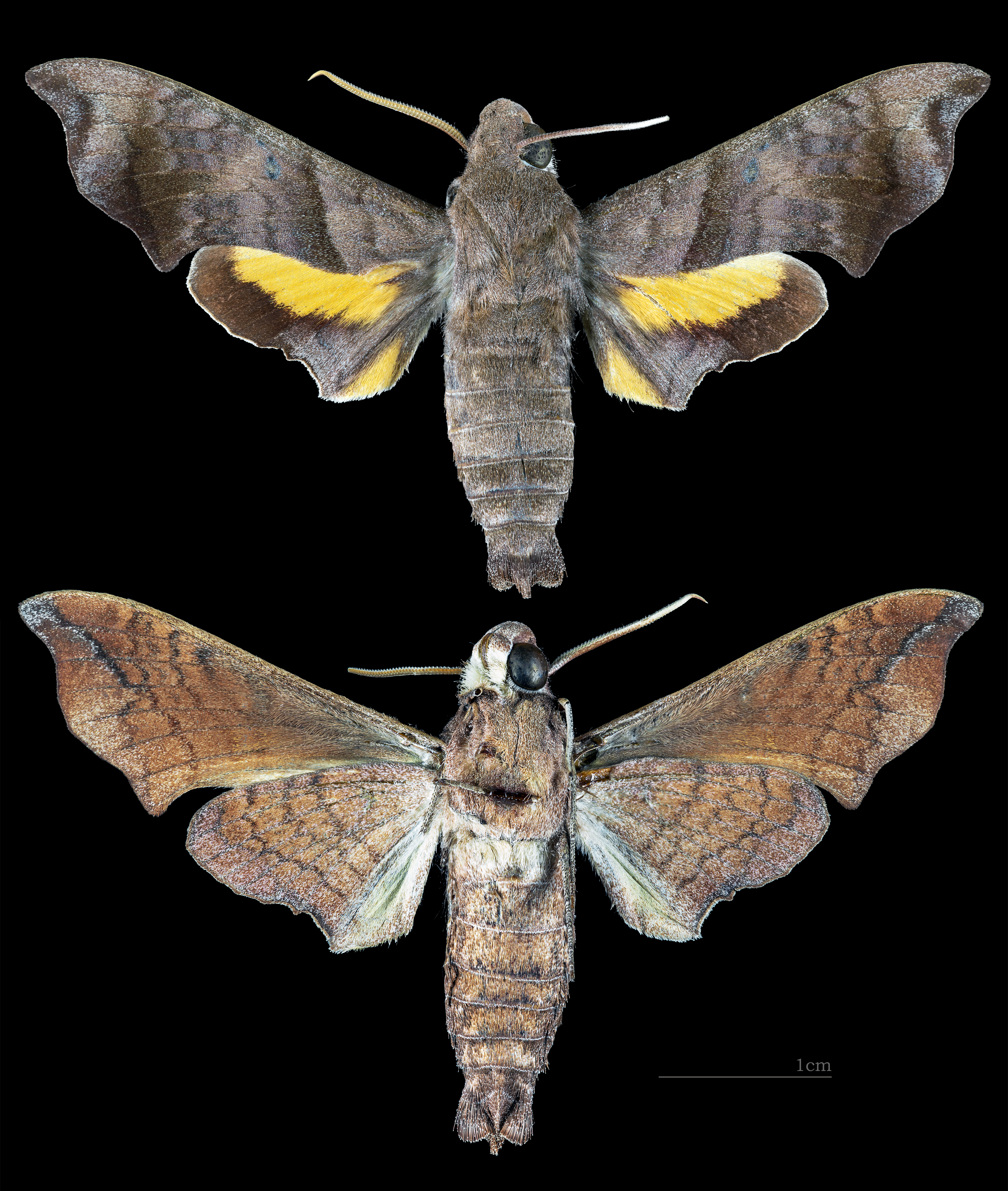
Perigonia pallida

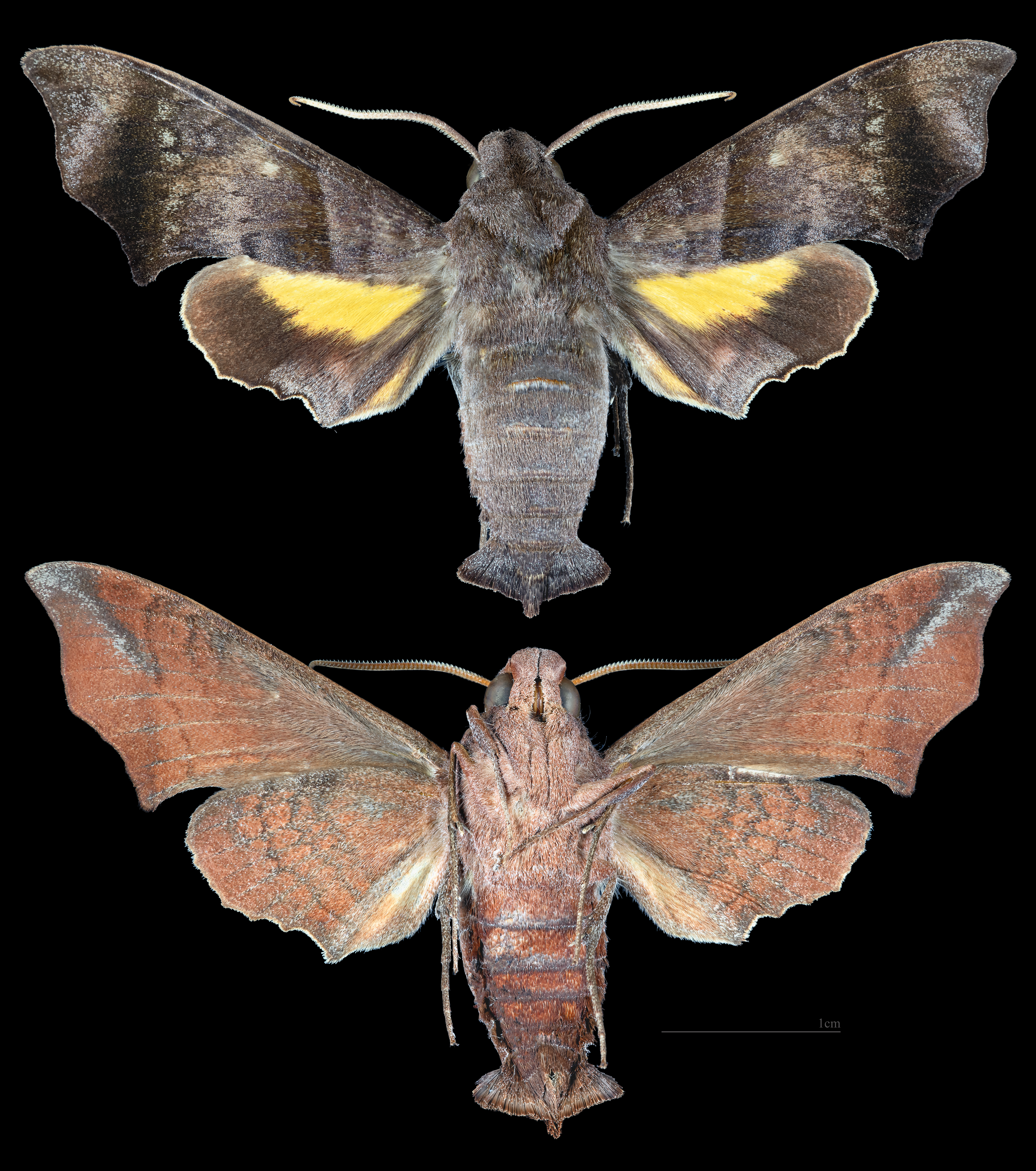
Perigonia stulta
