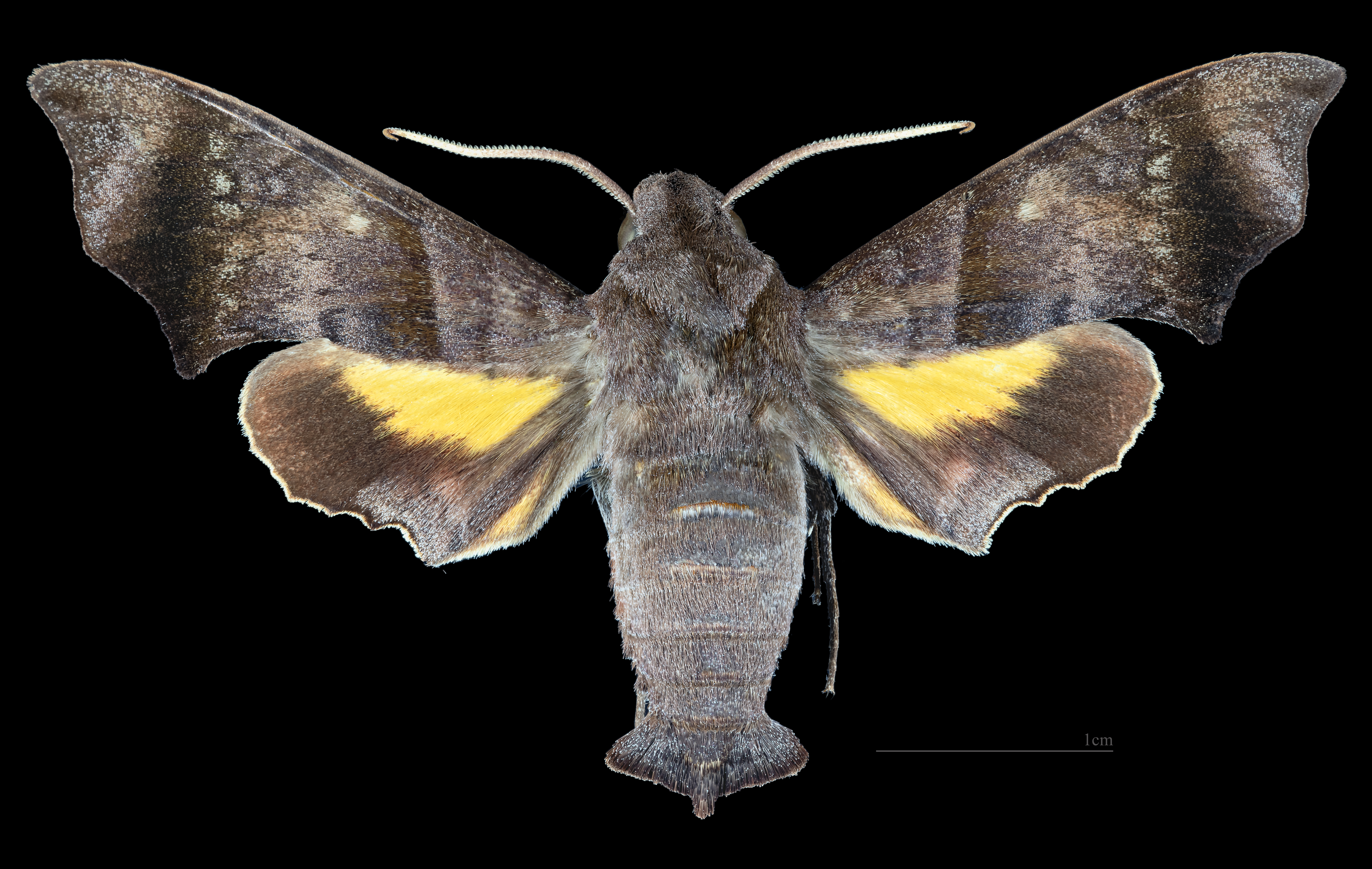
- male dorsal
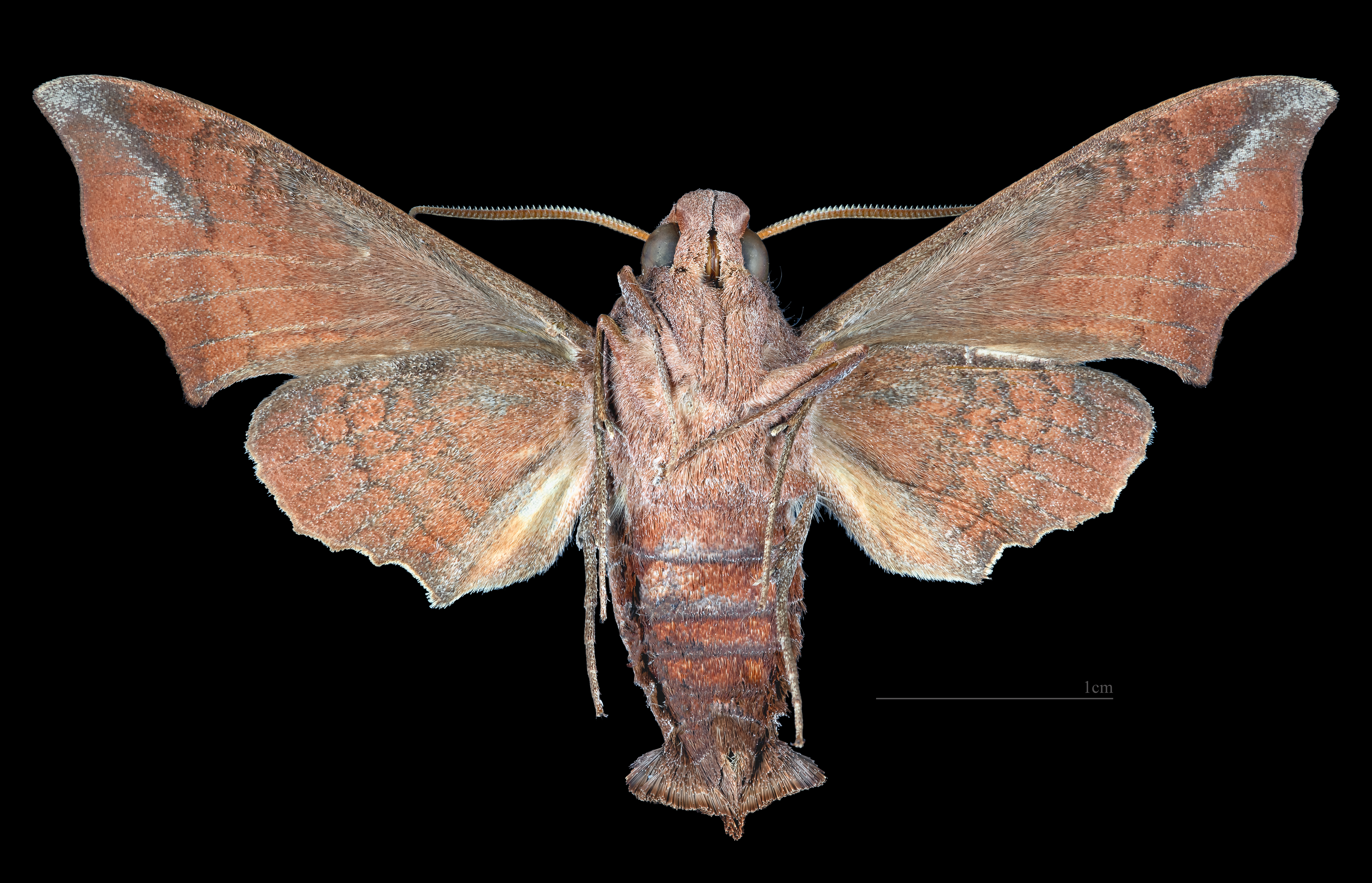
- male ventral

Scientific classification
- Domain: Eukaryota
- Kingdom: Animalia
- Phylum: Arthropoda
- Class: Insecta
- Order: Lepidoptera
- Family: Sphingidae
- Genus: Perigonia
- Species: P. stulta

Binomial name
- Perigonia stulta Herrich-Schaffer, 1854

= Perigonia stulta =

Species of moth

Perigonia stulta is a moth of the family Sphingidae. It is known from tropical America.

The wingspan is 50–55 mm. Adults are on wing year-round.
