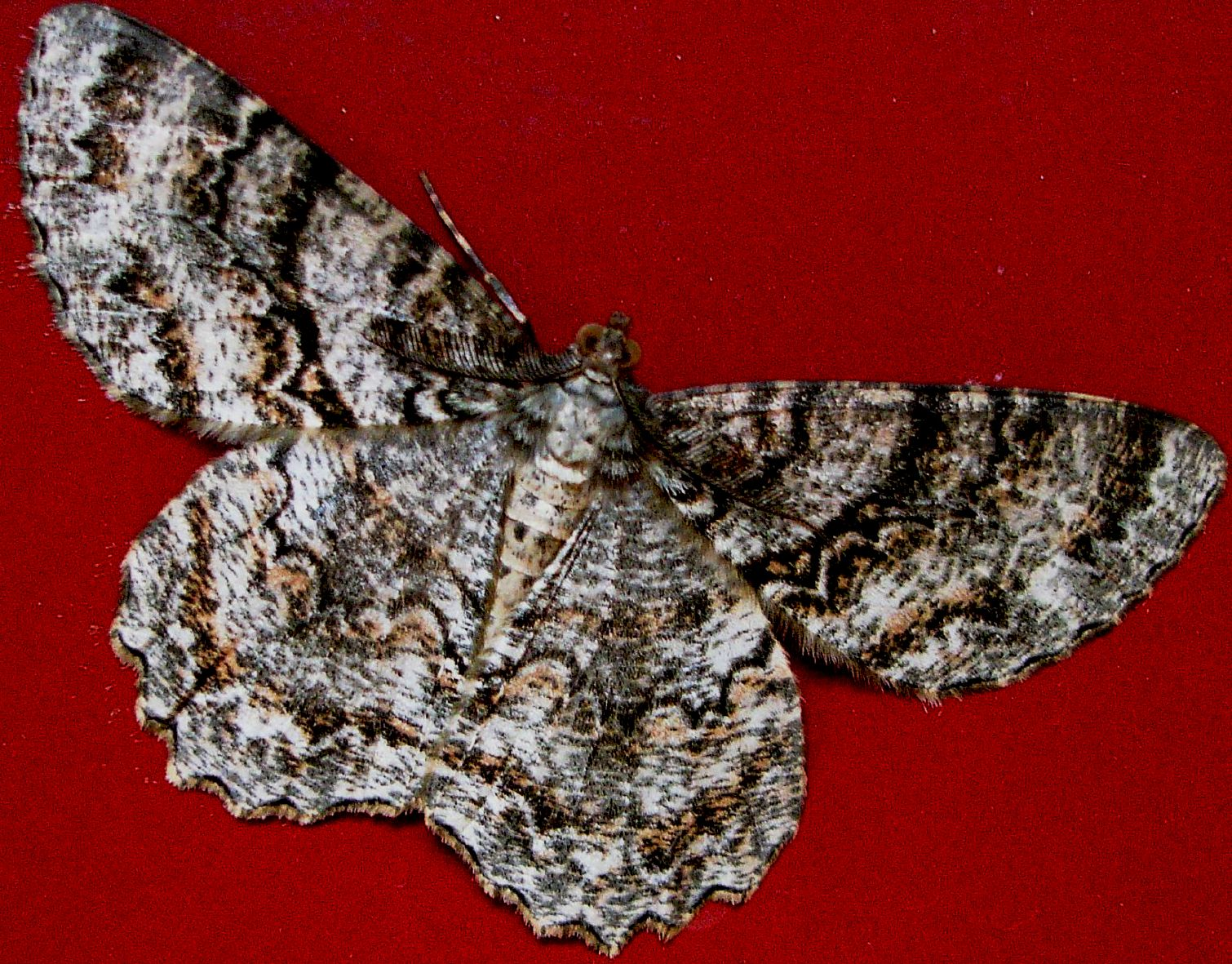
- E. hortaria

Scientific classification
- Kingdom: Animalia
- Phylum: Arthropoda
- Clade: Pancrustacea
- Class: Insecta
- Order: Lepidoptera
- Family: Geometridae
- Tribe: Boarmiini
- Genus: Epimecis; Hübner, 1825

= Epimecis =

Genus of moths

Epimecis is a genus of moths in the family Geometridae first described by Jacob Hübner in 1825.

== Species ==
- Epimecis akinaria (Dognin, 1907)
- Epimecis amianta (Prout, 1929)
- Epimecis benepicta (Warren, 1906)
- Epimecis confertistriga (Bastelberger, 1907)
- Epimecis conjugaria (Guenée, 1857)
- Epimecis consimilis (Warren, 1905)
- Epimecis curvilinea (Warren, 1907)
- Epimecis detexta (Walker, 1860) - avocado spanworm moth
- Epimecis fraternaria (Guenée, 1857)
- Epimecis fumistrota (Warren, 1904)
- Epimecis funeraria (Schaus, 1927)
- Epimecis hortaria (Fabricius, 1794) - tulip-tree beauty
- Epimecis masica (Druce, 1892)
- Epimecis matronaria (Guenée, 1857)
- Epimecis mundaria (Walker, 1860)
- Epimecis patronaria (Walker, 1860)
- Epimecis plumbilinea (Warren, 1905)
- Epimecis pudicaria (Guenée, 1858)
- Epimecis scolopaiae (Drury, 1773)
- Epimecis semicompleta (Warren, 1905)
- Epimecis subalbida (Warren, 1900)
- Epimecis subroraria (Walker, 1860)
- Epimecis vexillata (Felder, 1874)
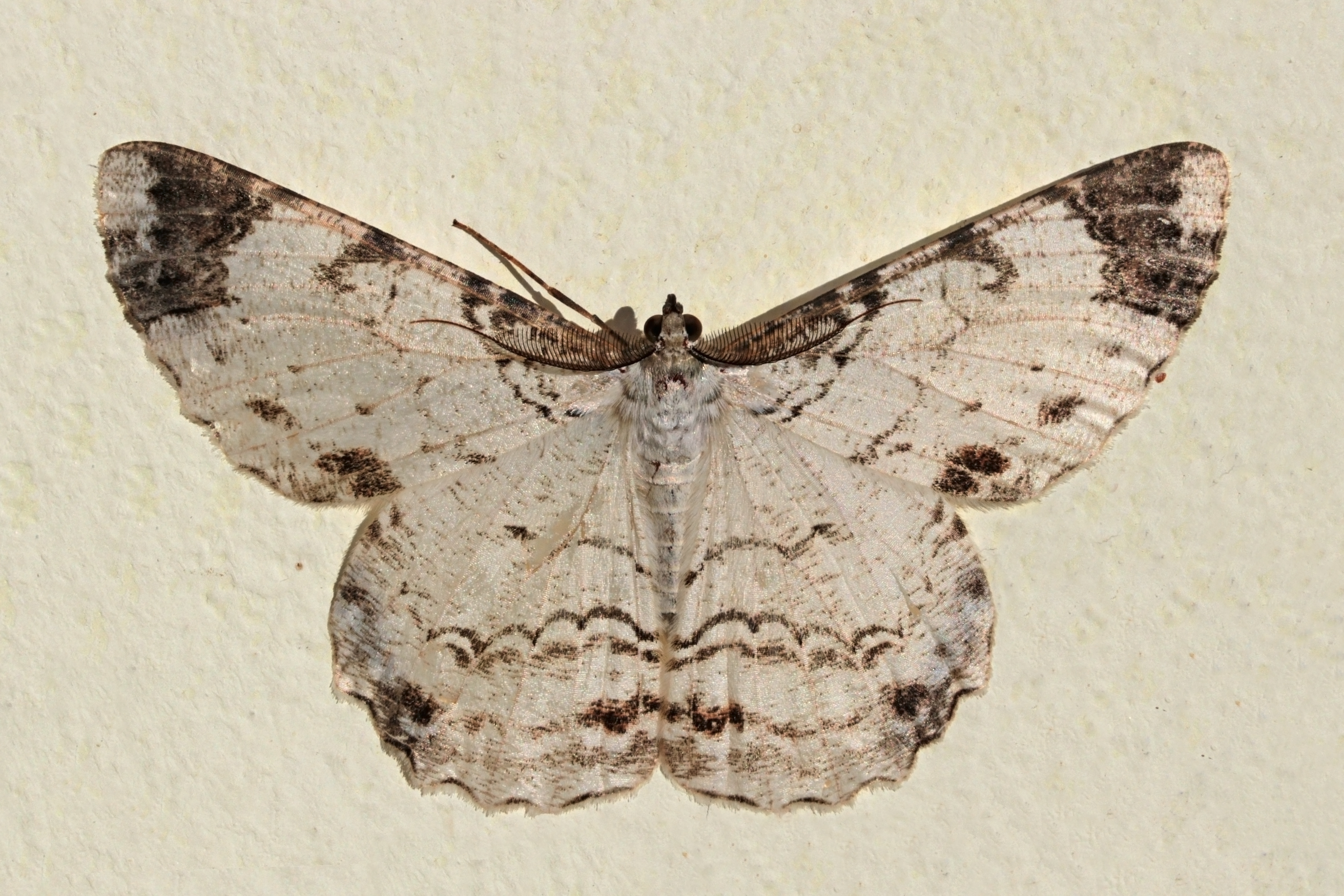
E. semicompleta
Mount Totumas cloud forest, Panama

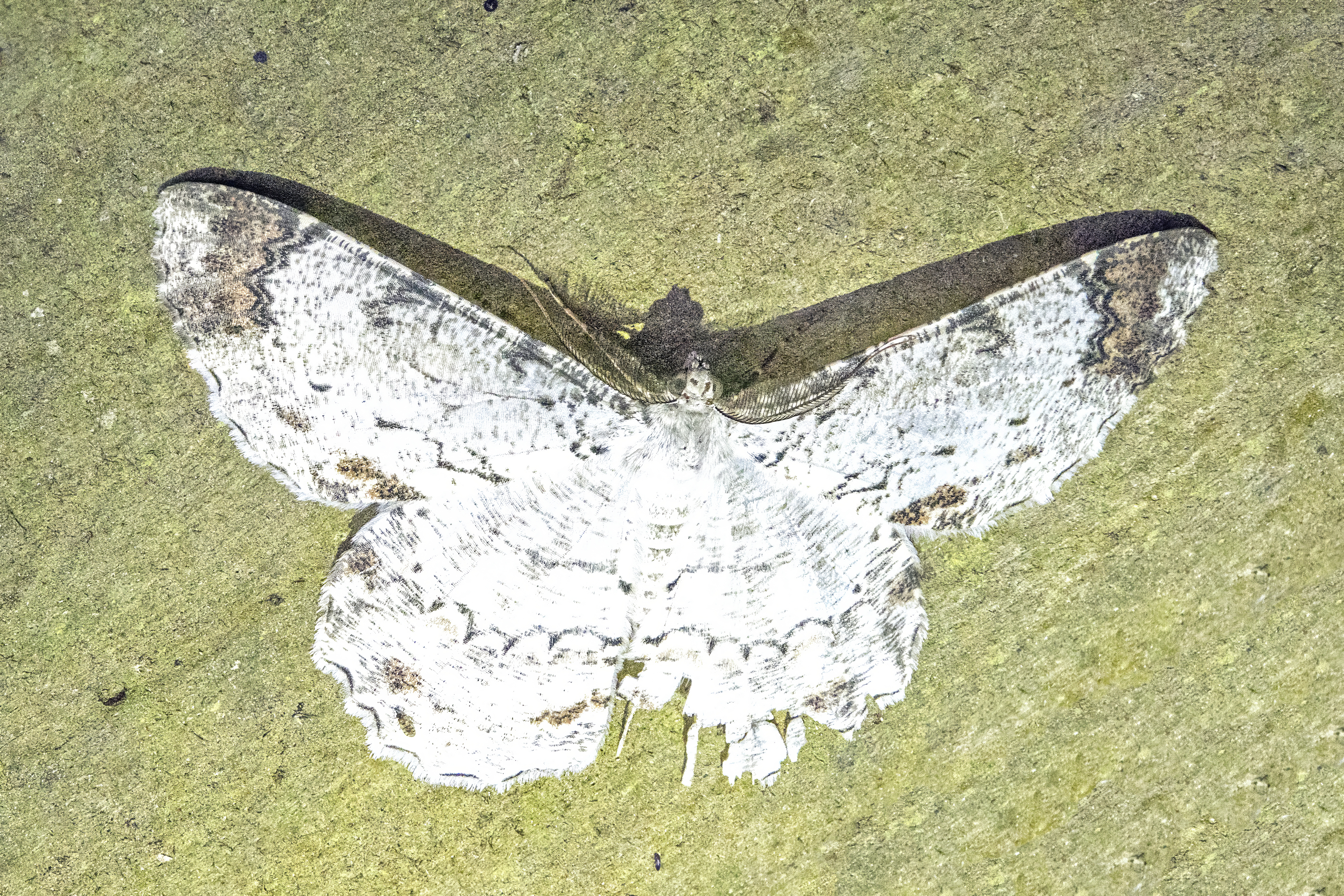
E. anonaria
Wayra, Ecuador
