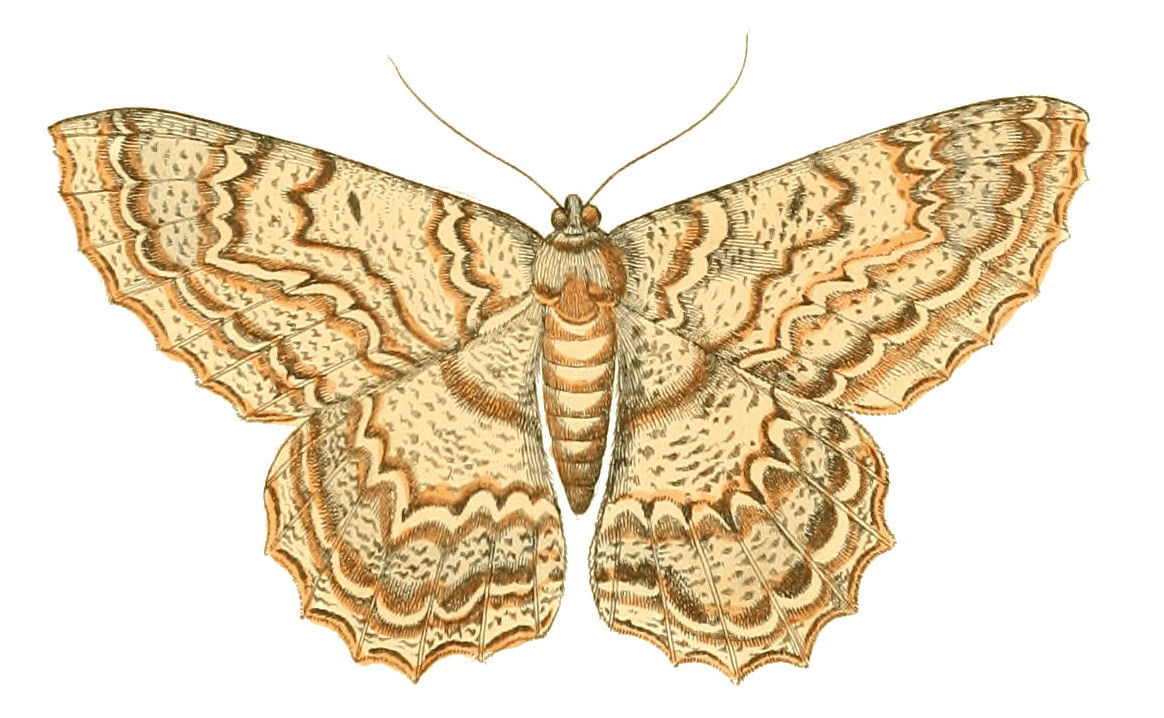

Scientific classification
- Domain: Eukaryota
- Kingdom: Animalia
- Phylum: Arthropoda
- Class: Insecta
- Order: Lepidoptera
- Family: Geometridae
- Genus: Epimecis
- Species: E. scolopaiae

Binomial name
- Epimecis scolopaiae (Drury, 1773)

Synonyms
- Noctua scolopaiae Drury, 1773; Alcis scolopacea (Westwood, 1837); Bronchelia transitaria Walker, 1860; Bronchelia jamaicaria Oberthur, 1913; Bronchelia nyctalemonaria Walker, 1860

= Epimecis scolopaiae =

Species of moth

Epimecis scolopaiae is a species of moth in the family Geometridae, subfamily Ennominae. It was first described by Dru Drury in 1773 from Jamaica.

== Description ==
Upper side: antennae filiform. Thorax, abdomen, and wings brownish grey; the latter varied with dark indented brown streaks and lines, contrasted with white and ash colour, crossing them from the anterior to the posterior and abdominal edges.

Under side: legs, sides, abdomen, and wings yellow wainscot-coloured. About half the anterior ones, from the tips towards the shoulders, are marked with faint dark brown lines and streaks. Posterior wings having a faintish dark brown cloud, situated near the upper corners. All the wings are deeply dentated. Wing-span nearly 3½ inches (87 mm).

== Subspecies ==
- Epimecis scolopaiae scolopaiae
- Epimecis scolopaiae transitaria (Walker, 1860)
