= Epimecis matronaria =

Scientific classification
- Kingdom: Animalia
- Phylum: Arthropoda
- Class: Insecta
- Order: Lepidoptera
- Family: Geometridae
- Tribe: Boarmiini
- Genus: Epimecis
- Species: E. matronaria

Binomial name
- Epimecis matronaria (Guenée in Boisduval & Guenée, 1858)

Species of moth

Epimecis matronaria is a species of geometrid moth in the family Geometridae. It is found in Central America and North America.

The MONA or Hodges number for Epimecis matronaria is 6601.
