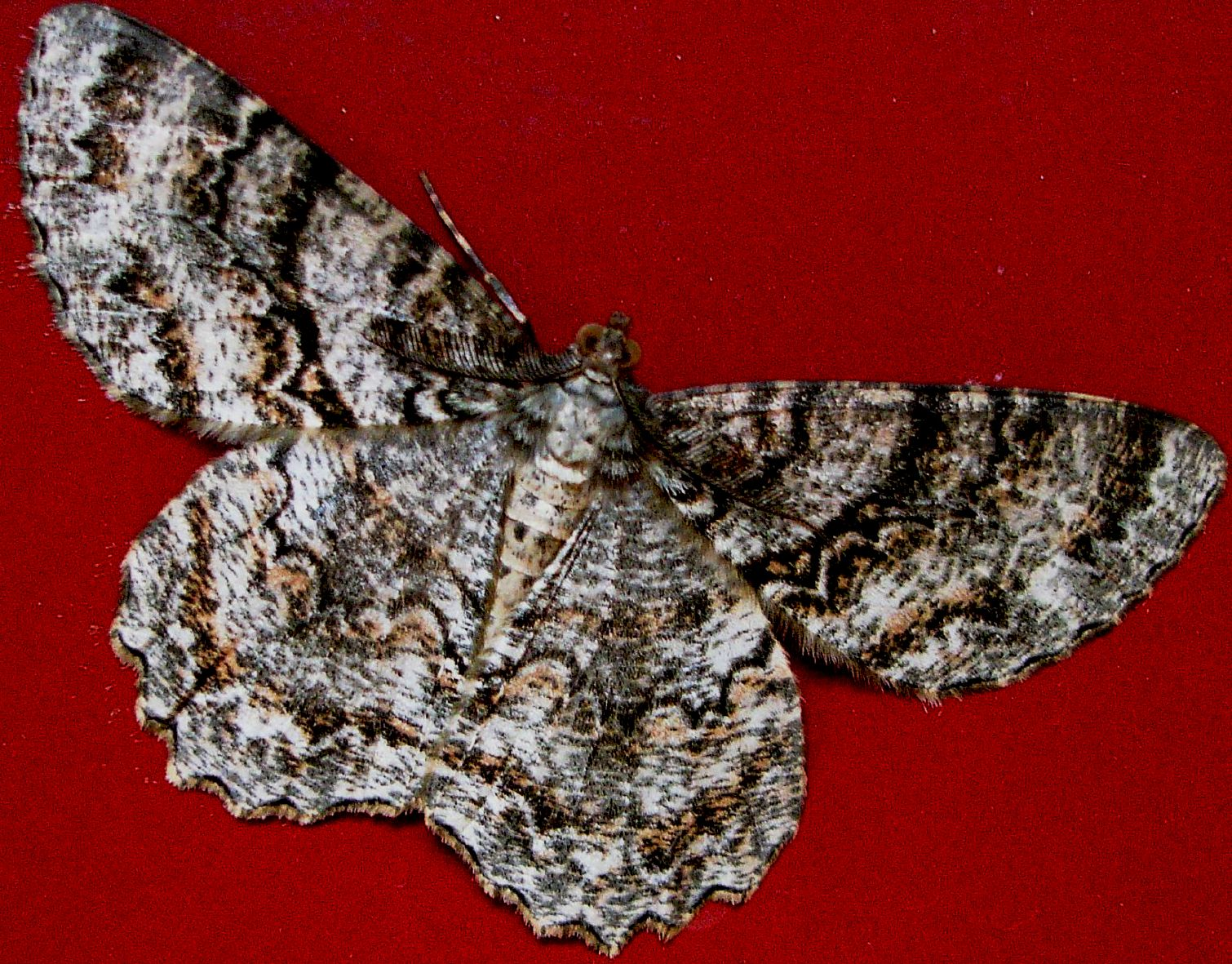

Scientific classification
- Domain: Eukaryota
- Kingdom: Animalia
- Phylum: Arthropoda
- Class: Insecta
- Order: Lepidoptera
- Family: Geometridae
- Genus: Epimecis
- Species: E. hortaria

Binomial name
- Epimecis hortaria (Fabricius, 1794)

= Epimecis hortaria =

Species of moth

Epimecis hortaria, the tulip-tree beauty, is a moth species of the Ennominae subfamily found in North America. It is found throughout New England south to Florida and west to Texas and Missouri. It was first described by Johan Christian Fabricius in 1794. It can be seen flying from late March to early October. Adults are nocturnal and attracted to lights. The immature caterpillars can be found feeding on Magnolia, Asimina, Populus, Sassafras and Liriodendron.

== Identification ==
With a wingspan of 43–55 mm, E. hortaria is one of the larger geometer moths. There are two forms, one being "Dendraria" and the other being "Carbonaria". The Dendraria has a broader median with subterminal lines while the Carbonaria is darker with white edging. The thick bodied caterpillar has a swollen 3rd thoracic segment. The caterpillar is gray to brown with darker markings, faint pinstripes and orange spiracles.
