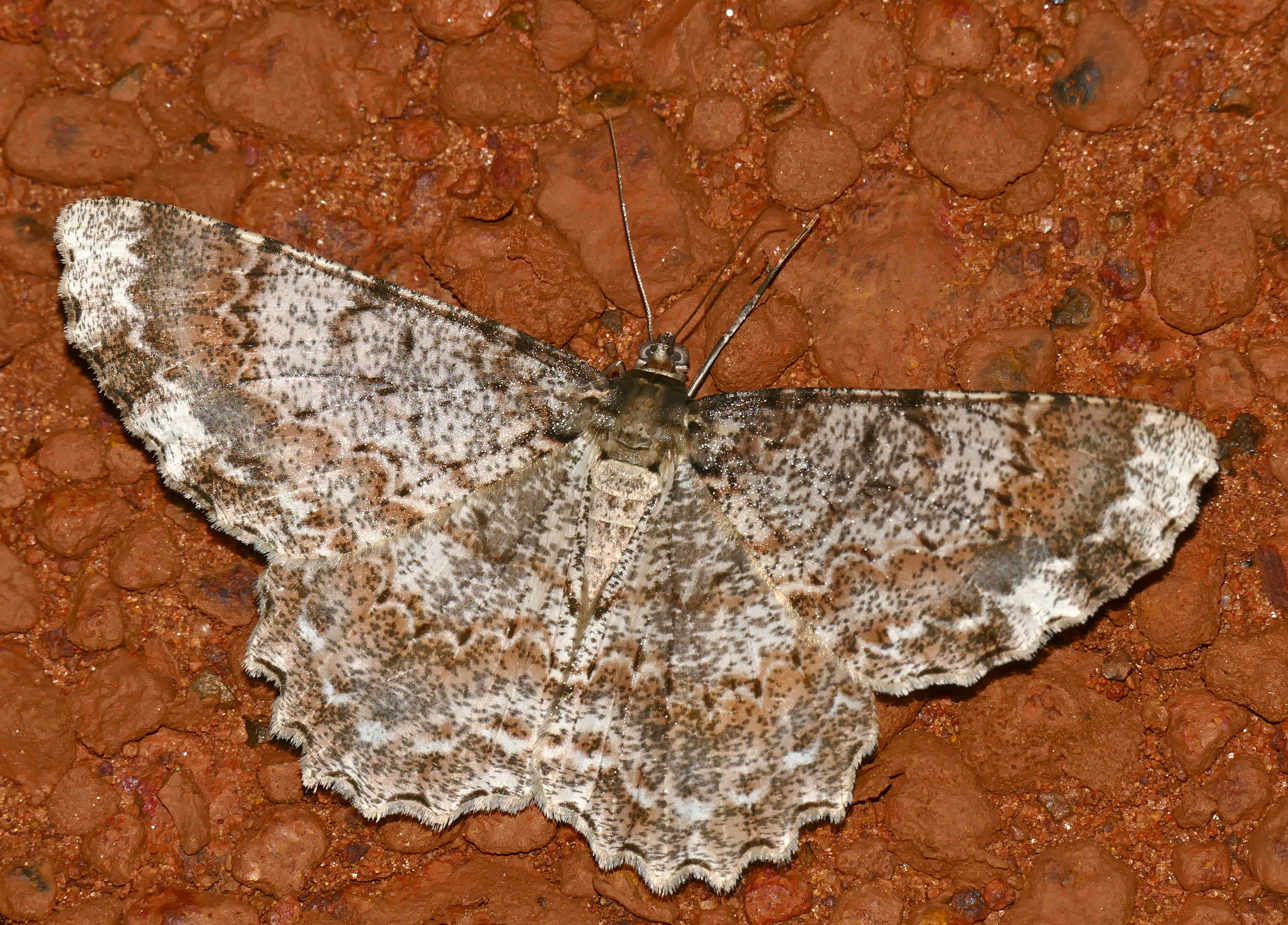

Scientific classification
- Kingdom: Animalia
- Phylum: Arthropoda
- Class: Insecta
- Order: Lepidoptera
- Family: Geometridae
- Genus: Epimecis
- Species: E. detexta

Binomial name
- Epimecis detexta (Walker, 1860)

= Epimecis detexta =

Species of moth

Epimecis detexta, the avocado spanworm moth, is a species of geometrid moth in the family Geometridae. It is found in the Caribbean Sea and North America.

The MONA or Hodges number for Epimecis detexta is 6604.
