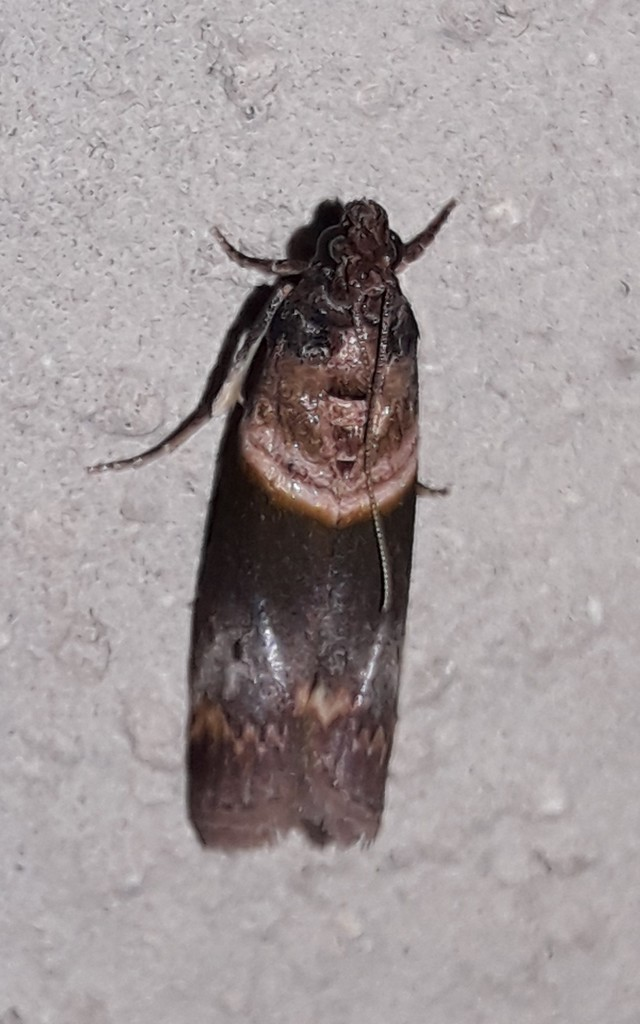

Scientific classification
- Domain: Eukaryota
- Kingdom: Animalia
- Phylum: Arthropoda
- Class: Insecta
- Order: Lepidoptera
- Family: Pyralidae
- Genus: Davara
- Species: D. caricae

Binomial name
- Davara caricae (Dyar, 1913)

Synonyms
- Eucardinia caricae Dyar, 1913; Homalopalpia dalera Dyar, 1914

= Davara caricae =

Species of moth

Davara caricae, the papaya webworm moth, is a species of snout moth in the genus Davara. It was described by Harrison Gray Dyar Jr. in 1913, and is known from Panama, Puerto Rico and Florida.
