= Davara (moth) =

Scientific classification
- Domain: Eukaryota
- Kingdom: Animalia
- Phylum: Arthropoda
- Class: Insecta
- Order: Lepidoptera
- Family: Pyralidae
- Subfamily: Phycitinae
- Genus: Davara; Walker, 1859

Synonyms
- Homalopalpia Dyar, 1914; Eucardinia Dyar, 1918

Genus of moths

Davara is a genus of snout moths. It was described by Francis Walker in 1859 and is known from Puerto Rico.

== Species ==
- Davara azonaxsalis Walker, 1859
- Davara caricae (Dyar, 1913)
- Davara rufulella (Ragonot, 1889)
