= Davara rufulella =

Scientific classification
- Domain: Eukaryota
- Kingdom: Animalia
- Phylum: Arthropoda
- Class: Insecta
- Order: Lepidoptera
- Family: Pyralidae
- Genus: Davara
- Species: D. rufulella

Binomial name
- Davara rufulella (Ragonot, 1889)

Synonyms
- Piesmopoda rufulella Ragonot, 1889

Species of moth

Davara rufulella is a species of snout moth in the genus Davara. It was described by Ragonot in 1889, and is known from Puerto Rico.
