= Davara azonaxsalis =

Scientific classification
- Kingdom: Animalia
- Phylum: Arthropoda
- Class: Insecta
- Order: Lepidoptera
- Family: Pyralidae
- Genus: Davara
- Species: D. azonaxsalis

Binomial name
- Davara azonaxsalis Walker, 1859

Species of moth

Davara azonaxsalis is a species of snout moth in the genus Davara. It was described by Francis Walker in 1859. It is found in Brazil.
