= Crocidomera fissuralis =

Scientific classification
- Kingdom: Animalia
- Phylum: Arthropoda
- Class: Insecta
- Order: Lepidoptera
- Family: Pyralidae
- Genus: Crocidomera
- Species: C. fissuralis

Binomial name
- Crocidomera fissuralis (Walker, 1863)

Synonyms
- Nephopteryx fissuralis Walker, 1863; Myelois adorea C. Felder, R. Felder & Rogenhofer, 1875; Crocidomera adorea

Species of moth

Crocidomera fissuralis is a species of snout moth in the genus Crocidomera. It was described by Francis Walker in 1863, and is known from Hispaniola and Puerto Rico.
