= Crocidomera turbidella =

Scientific classification
- Kingdom: Animalia
- Phylum: Arthropoda
- Clade: Pancrustacea
- Class: Insecta
- Order: Lepidoptera
- Family: Pyralidae
- Genus: Crocidomera
- Species: C. turbidella

Binomial name
- Crocidomera turbidella Zeller, 1848

Species of moth

Crocidomera turbidella is a species of snout moth in the genus Crocidomera. It was described by Zeller in 1848. It is found in Cuba, Jamaica and Mexico.
