= Crocidomera =

Scientific classification
- Kingdom: Animalia
- Phylum: Arthropoda
- Clade: Pancrustacea
- Class: Insecta
- Order: Lepidoptera
- Family: Pyralidae
- Subfamily: Phycitinae
- Genus: Crocidomera; Zeller, 1848

Genus of moths

Crocidomera is a genus of snout moths. It was described by Zeller, in 1848.

== Species ==
- Crocidomera fissuralis (Walker, 1863)
- Crocidomera imitata Neunzig, 1990
- Crocidomera turbidella Zeller, 1848
