= Crocidomera imitata =

Scientific classification
- Domain: Eukaryota
- Kingdom: Animalia
- Phylum: Arthropoda
- Class: Insecta
- Order: Lepidoptera
- Family: Pyralidae
- Genus: Crocidomera
- Species: C. imitata

Binomial name
- Crocidomera imitata Neunzig, 1990

Species of moth

Crocidomera imitata is a species of snout moth in the genus Crocidomera. It was described by Herbert H. Neunzig in 1990. It is found in Texas and Florida.

== Etymology ==
The name is derived from Latin imita (meaning imitate, copy).
