= List of moths of Jamaica =

This list of moths of Jamaica consists of moths recorded from the island of Jamaica. Note that this list of moths is incomplete. There is also a list of butterflies of Jamaica.

== Moths ==
=== Nepticuloidea ===
==== Opostegidae ====
- Pseudopostega longifurcata Davis & Stonis, 2007
- Pseudopostega mignonae Davis & Stonis, 2007
- Pseudopostega saltatrix (Walsingham, 1897)

=== Tineoidea ===
==== Psychidae ====
===== Psychinae =====
- Paucivena hispaniolae Davis, 1975
- Paucivena reticulata Davis, 1975

===== Oiketicinae =====
- Oiketicus kirbyi Guilding, 1827

==== Tineidae ====
===== Acrolophinae =====
- Acrolophus illudens Meyrick, 1924
- Acrolophus irrisoria Meyrick, 1924

=== Gracillaroidea ===
==== Gracillariidae ====
===== Gracillariinae =====
- Dialectica rendalli Walsingham, 1897
- Dialectica sanctaecrucis Walsingham, 1897
- Macrosaccus gliricidius Davis, 2011
- Neurobathra cupreela (Walsingham, 1897)
- Phyllocnistis citrella Stainton, 1856

=== Gelechioidea ===
==== Elachistidae ====
===== Ethmiinae =====
- Ethmia abraxasella Busck, 1914
- Ethmia cubensis Busck, 1934
- Ethmia farrella Powell, 1973
- Ethmia gelidella (Walker, 1864)
- Ethmia humilis Powell, 1973
- Ethmia piperella Powell, 1973
- Ethmia scythropa Walsingham, 1912
- Ethmia submissa Busck, 1914
- Ethmia subsimilis Walsingham, 1897

==== Cosmopterigidae ====
===== Cosmopteriginae =====
- Cosmopterix abnormalis Walsingham, 1897
- Cosmopterix albicaudis Meyrick, 1932
- Cosmopterix argentifera Koster, 2010
- Cosmopterix astrapias Walsingham, 1909
- Cosmopterix attenuatella (Walker, 1864)
- Cosmopterix ebriola Hodges, 1962
- Cosmopterix floridanella Beutenmüller, 1889
- Cosmopterix interfracta Meyrick, 1922
- Cosmopterix irrubricata Walsingham, 1909
- Cosmopterix teligera Meyrick, 1915
- Pebobs elara Koster, 2010

=== Pterophoroidea ===
==== Pterophoridae ====
===== Pterophorinae =====
- Exelastis montischristi (Walsingham, 1897)
- Exelastis pumilio (Zeller, 1873)

=== Choreutoidea ===
==== Choreutidae ====
===== Choreutinae =====
- Brenthia confluxana (Walker, 1863)

=== Tortricoidea ===
==== Tortricidae ====
===== Olethreutinae =====
- Ethelgoda texanana (Walsingham, 1879)

===== Tortricinae =====
- Aethes olibra Razowski, 1994
- Argyrotaenia jamaicana Razowski & Becker, 2000
- Argyrotaenia minisignaria chalarostium Razowski & Becker, 2000

=== Cossoidea ===
==== Cossidae ====
===== Cossinae =====
- Cossula morgani Clench, 1957
- Voousia punctifer Hampson, 1898

===== Zeuzerinae =====
- Psychonoctua personalis Grote, 1865

=== Zygaenoidea ===
==== Limacodidae ====
- Alarodia nana Möeschler, 1886

==== Dalceridae ====
- Acraga ciliata Walker, 1855

==== Hyblaeidae ====
- Hyblaea puera (Cramer, 1777)

=== Hyblaeoidea ===
==== Hedylidae ====
- Macrosoma stabilinota Prout, 1932

=== Pyraloidea ===
==== Pyralidae ====
- Carcha hersilialis Walker, 1859
- Epitamyra thermalis Hampson, 1906
- Galasa rubidana Walker, 1866
- Megacaphys titana Schaus, 1904
- Parachmidia fervidalis Walker, 1866
- Salobrena recurvata (Möschler, 1886)
- Salobrena vacuana (Walker, 1863)

===== Galleriinae =====
- Epimorius testaceellus Ragonot, 1887
- Galleria mellonella (Linnaeus, 1758)

===== Epipaschiinae =====
- Dasyvesica lophotalis Hampson, 1906
- Deuterollyta claudalis Möeschler, 1886
- Deuterollyta majuscula (Herrich-Schäffer, 1871)
- Macalla phaeobasalis Hampson, 1916
- Pococera polialis Hampson, 1906
- Tallula atramentalis (Lederer, 1863)
- Tineopaschia minuta Hampson, 1916

===== Phycitinae =====
- Anabasis ochrodesma (Zeller, 1881)
- Ancylostomia stercorea (Zeller, 1848)
- Anypsipyla univitella Dyar, 1914
- Cabotia bonhoti Hampson, 1901
- Caristanius pellucidella (Ragonot, 1889)
- Crocidomera turbidella Zeller, 1848
- Ectomyelois ceratoniae (Zeller, 1839)
- Ectomyelois decolor (Zeller, 1881)
- Elasmopalpus lignosellus (Zeller, 1848)
- Ephestia kuehniella Zeller, 1879
- Ephestiodes stictella Hampson, 1901
- Etiella zinckenella (Treitschke, 1832)
- Fundella argentina Dyar, 1919
- Hypsipyla grandella (Zeller, 1848)
- Nonia exiguella Ragonot, 1888
- Ozamia lucidalis (Walker, 1863)
- Phestinia costella Hampson, 1930
- Plodia interpunctella (Hübner, [1810–13])
- Stylopalpia lunigerella Hampson, 1901
- Ufa rubedinella (Zeller, 1848)

===== Pyralinae =====
- Luma albifascialis Hampson, 1897
- Mapeta xanthomelas Walker, 1863
- Megastes brunnealis Hampson, 1913
- Nomophila nearctica Munroe, 1973
- Steniodes gelliasalis Walker, 1859

===== Scopariinae =====
- Himantoides perkinsae Clark, 1933
- Himantoides undata Walker, 1856
- Scoparia atricuprea Hampson, 1917

==== Crambidae ====
===== Crambinae =====
- Argyria vestalis Butler, 1878
- Crambus coccophthorus Bleszynski, 1962
- Diatraea saccharalis (Fabricius, 1794)
- Donacoscaptes micralis Hampson, 1919
- Fissicrambus curtellus Walker, 1863
- Fissicrambus profanellus (Walker, 1866)
- Mesolia jamaicensis Hampson, 1919
- Microcausta argenticilia Hampson, 1919
- Microcrambus atristrigellus (Hampson, 1919)
- Parapediasia ligonella (Zeller, 1881)
- Pediasia luteolella Hulst, 1886
- Prionapteryx eugraphis Walker, 1863

===== Glaphyriinae =====
- Chalcoela pegasalis (Walker, [1866])
- Dicymolomia metalophota (Hampson, 1897)
- Glaphyria badierana (Fabricius, 1794)
- Glaphyria decisa (Walker, [1866])
- Glaphyria pupillalis Möeschler, 1886
- Hellula phidilealis (Walker, 1859)
- Stegea jamaicensis Munroe, 1964

===== Dichogaminae =====
- Alatuncusia bergii (Möschler, 1890)
- Dichogama decoralis (Walker, 1865)
- Dichogama innocus (Fabricius, 1793)
- Dichogama redtenbacheri Lederer, 1863

===== Musotiminae =====
- Barisoa intentalis Möeschler, 1886
- Neurophyseta rufalis Hampson, 1912
- Undulambia albitessellalis (Hampson, 1906)
- Undulambia grisealis Hampson, 1906
- Undulambia leucocymalis Hampson, 1906
- Undulambia oedizonalis Hampson, 1906
- Undulambia phaeochroalis Hampson, 1906

===== Acentropinae =====
- Neargyractis fulvicinctalis Hampson, 1897
- Neargyractis moniligeralis Lederer, 1863
- Petrophila albulalis (Hampson, 1906)

===== Odontiinae =====
- Basonga paradisalis Möeschler, 1886
- Cliniodes cyllarusalis Druce, 1895
- Cliniodes euphrosinalis (Möschler, 1896)
- Cliniodes opalalis Guenée, 1854
- Cliniodes underwoodi H. Druce, 1899
- Microtheoris ophionalis (Walker, 1859)
- Mimoschinia rufofascialis (Stephens, 1834)

===== Evergestinae =====
- Evergestella evincalis (Möschler, 1890)
- Evergestis rimosalis Guenée, 1854
- Symphysa discalis Hampson, 1912
- Trischistognatha pyrenealis (Walker, 1859)

===== Pyraustinae =====
- Achyra bifidalis (Fabricius, 1794)
- Achyra rantalis (Guenée, 1854)
- Agathodes designalis Guenée, 1854
- Apogeshna infirmalis (Möschler, 1886)
- Sisyracera subulalis (Guenée, 1854)
- Arthromastix lauralis (Walker, 1859)
- Asciodes gordialis Guenée, 1854
- Asciodes scopulalis Guenée, 1854
- Asturodes fimbriauralis (Guenée, 1854)
- Ategumia ebulealis (Guenée, 1854)
- Ategumia matutinalis (Guenée, 1854)
- Bicilia iarchasalis (Walker, 1859)
- Bicilia lentistrialis Dognin, 1906
- Bicilia olivia Butler, 1875
- Blepharomastix achroalis (Hampson, 1913)
- Blepharomastix branealis Schaus, 1924
- Bradina hemmingalis Schaus, 1940
- Bradina purpurascens Hampson, 1907
- Coenostolopsis apicalis (Lederer, 1863)
- Conchylodes diphteralis (Geyer, 1832)
- Cryptobotys zoilusalis (Walker, 1859)
- Cyclocena lelex (Cramer, 1777)
- Desmia ceresalis (Walker, 1859)
- Desmia deploralis Hampson, 1912
- Desmia ploralis (Guenée, 1854)
- Desmia tages (Cramer, 1777)
- Desmia ufeus (Cramer, 1777)
- Deuterophysa micralis Hampson, 1907
- Deuterophysa sanguiflualis Hampson, 1913
- Diacme mopsalis (Walker, 1859)
- Diacme phyllisalis (Walker, 1859)
- Diaphania attigua E. Hering, 1906
- Diaphania costata (Fabricius, 1794)
- Diaphania elegans (Möschler, 1890)
- Diaphania fuscicaudalis (Möschler, 1881)
- Diaphania hyalinata (Linnaeus, 1767)
- Diaphania nitidalis (Cramer, 1781)
- Diasemiopsis leodocusalis (Walker, 1859)
- Epicorsia oedipodalis (Guenée, 1854)
- Epipagis zinghalis Walker, 1859
- Ercta vittata (Fabricius, 1794)
- Eulepte gastralis (Guenée, 1854)
- Eulepte inguinalis (Guenée, 1854)
- Glyphodes heliconialis Guenée, 1854
- Glyphodes sibillalis Walker, 1859
- Herpetogramma agavealis Walker, 1859
- Herpetogramma bipunctalis (Fabricius, 1794)
- Herpetogramma infuscalis (Guenée, 1854)
- Herpetogramma phaeopteralis (Guenée, 1854)
- Hileithia magualis (Guenée, 1854)
- Hileithia terminalis Hampson, 1912
- Hymenia perspectalis (Hübner, 1796)
- Lamprosema oxiperalis Hampson, 1912
- Leucochroma jamaicensis Hampson, 1912
- Lineodes fontella Walsingham, 1913
- Loxomorpha cambogialis (Guenée, 1854)
- Lygropia tripunctata (Fabricius, 1794)
- Maruca vitrata (Fabricius, 1787)
- Microphysetica hermeasalis (Walker, 1859)
- Microthyris anormalis (Guenée, 1854)
- Microthyris prolongalis (Guenée, 1854)
- Mimorista brunneoflavalis Hampson, 1913
- Mimorista diopalis Hampson, 1913
- Mimorista jamaicalis Haimbach, 1915
- Mimorista matronulalis Möeschler, 1886
- Mimorista villicalis Möeschler, 1886
- Neohelvibotys neohelvialis (Capps, 1967)
- Neoleucinodes elegantalis (Guenée, 1854)
- Neoleucinodes torvis Capps, 1948
- Oenobotys vinotinctalis (Hampson, 1895)
- Omiodes indicata (Fabricius, 1775)
- Omiodes xanthodysana Dyar, 1914
- Ommatospila narcaeusalis (Walker, 1859)
- Ostrinia penitalis (Hampson, 1913)
- Palpita flegia (Cramer, 1777)
- Palpita punctalis Warren, 1896
- Palpusia glaucusalis Walker, 1859
- Penestola bufalis (Guenée, 1854)
- Phaedropsis collustralis Möeschler, 1886
- Phaedropsis meropialis Möeschler, 1886
- Phaedropsis principialis Lederer, 1863
- Phostria tedea Cramer, 1782
- Pilocrocis hypoleucalis Hampson, 1912
- Pilocrocis monothyralis Hampson, 1912
- Pilocrocis reniferalis Hampson, 1912
- Pleuroptya silicalis (Guenée, 1854)
- Polygrammodes elevata (Fabricius, 1794)
- Polygrammodes ostrealis (Guenée, 1854)
- Portentomorpha xanthialis (Guenée, 1854)
- Prenesta ignefactalis Möeschler, 1886
- Prenesta ornamentalis Möeschler, 1881
- Prenesta philinoralis Walker, 1859
- Prenesta prosopealis Walker, 1859
- Psara dryalis (Walker, 1859)
- Psara pertentalis Möschler, 1890
- Pseudopyrausta acutangulalis (Snellen, 1875)
- Pseudopyrausta minima von Hedemann
- Pyrausta insignitalis (Guenée, 1854)
- Pyrausta phoenicealis (Walker, 1859)
- Pyrausta carnifex Felder & Rogenhofer, 1874
- Pyrausta tyralis (Guenée, 1854)
- Rhectocraspeda periusalis (Walker, 1859)
- Salbia cassidalis Guenée, 1854
- Salbia haemorrhoidalis Guenée, 1854
- Salbia tytiusalis Walker, 1859
- Samea carettalis Schaus, 1940
- Samea ecclesialis Guenée, 1854
- Sathria simmialis Walker, 1859
- Sisyracera contortilinealis Hampson, 1895
- Sisyracera subulalis (Guenée, 1854)
- Sparagmia gonoptera Munroe, 1958
- Spoladea recurvalis (Fabricius, 1775)
- Steniodes mendica (Hedemann, 1894)
- Syllepis marialis Poey, 1832
- Syllepte belialis (Walker, 1859)
- Synclera chlorophasma Butler, 1878
- Syngamia florella (Cramer, 1781)
- Terastia meticulosalis Guenée, 1854
- Triuncidia eupalusalis (Walker, 1859)
- Udea secernalis (Möschler, 1890)
- Uresiphita reversalis (Guenée, 1854)
- Zenamorpha discophoralis (Hampson, 1899)

==== Bombycoidea ====
===== Saturniidae =====
- Samia cynthia Drury, 1773

==== Sphingidae ====
===== Macroglossinae =====
- Aellopos blaini Herrich-Schäffer, [1869]
- Aellopos clavipes (Rothschild & Jordan, 1903)
- Aellopos fadus (Cramer, 1775)
- Aellopos tantalus (Drury, 1773)
- Callionima falcifera Gehlen, 1943
- Cautethia grotei Edwards, 1882
- Enyo lugubris (Linnaeus, 1771)
- Enyo ocypete (Linnaeus, 1758)
- Erinnyis alope (Drury, 1773)
- Erinnyis crameri (Schaus, 1898)
- Erinnyis domingonis Butler, 1875
- Erinnyis ello (Linnaeus, 1758)
- Erinnyis guttularis (Walker, 1856)
- Erinnyis lassauxii (Boisduval, 1859)
- Erinnyis obscura (Fabricius, 1775)
- Erinnyis oenotrus (Cramer, 1780)
- Eumorpha fasciatus (Sulzer, 1776)
- Eumorpha labruscae (Linnaeus, 1758)
- Eumorpha satellitia (Grote, 1865)
- Eumorpha vitis (Linnaeus, 1758)
- Hyles lineata (Fabricius, 1775)
- Isognathus rimosa (Grote, 1865)
- Madoryx oiclus (Cramer, [1780])
- Pachylia ficus (Linnaeus, 1758)
- Pachylia syces Hübner, [1819]
- Pachylioides resumens (Walker, 1856)
- Perigonia jamaicensis Butler, 1877
- Phryxus caicus (Cramer, 1777)
- Pseudosphinx tetrio (Linnaeus, 1771)
- Xylophanes chiron Rothschild & Jordan, 1906
- Xylophanes jamaicensis Clark, 1935
- Xylophanes maculator Boisduval, 1875
- Xylophanes pluto (Fabricius, 1777)
- Xylophanes tersa (Linnaeus, 1771)

===== Sphinginae =====
- Adhemarius gannascus Stoll, 1790
- Agrius cingulata (Fabricius, 1775)
- Cocytius antaeus (Drury, 1773)
- Cocytius duponchel (Poey, 1832)
- Manduca brontes (Grote, 1865)
- Manduca rustica (Wood, 1915)
- Manduca sexta (Butler, 1875)
- Nannoparce poeyi (Grote, 1865)
- Neococytius cluentius (Cramer, 1775)
- Protambulyx strigilis (Linnaeus, 1771)

==== Uraniidae ====
- Erosia incongua Butler, 1878
- Urania poeyi (Herrich-Schäffer, 1868)
- Urania sloanus Cramer, 1874

==== Sematuridae ====
- Mania aegisthus (Fabricius, 1781)

==== Geometridae ====
===== Oenochrominae =====
- Ametris nitocris (Cramer, 1780)
- Ergavia subrufa Warren, 1897
- Zanclopteryx uniferata Walker, 1863

===== Ennominae =====
- Epimecis detexta (Walker, 1860)
- Epimecis scolopaiae (Drury, 1773)
- Erastria decrepitaria (Hübner, [1823])
- Erosina hyberniata Guenée, [1858]
- Hydatoscia ategua (Druce, 1892)
- Iridopsis vicaria Walker, 1860
- Psamatodes doriteata Guenée, 1858
- Macaria nervata Guenée, 1858
- Melanochroia chephise (Stoll, 1782)
- Melanochroia venata Rindge, 1961
- Melanolophia mutabilis (Warren, 1897)
- Nepheloleuca politia (Guenée, [1858])
- Numia terebintharia Guenée, [1858]
- Oenoptila nigrilineata Warren, 1897
- Oxydia olivacea (Warren, 1895)
- Oxydia vesulia (Walker, 1860)
- Patalene epionata (Guenée, [1858])
- Patalene falcularia Sepp, 1852
- Patalene nutriaria Walker, 1860
- Patalene sordida Warren, 1906
- Perissopteryx ochrilinea Warren, 1904
- Pero bicolor Warren, 1895
- Pero variaria Walker, 1860
- Phrygionis argentata Drury, 1773
- Phrygionis paradoxata (Guenée, 1857)
- Phrygionis platinata (Guenée, 1858)
- Phrygionis sumptuosaria Möeschler, 1886
- Prochoerodes tetragonata Guenée, 1858
- Prochoerodes transtincta Walker, 1860
- Psamatodes abydata (Guenée, 1855)
- Psamatodes everiata (Guenée, [1858])
- Psamatodes nicetaria (Guenée, 1858)
- Sabulodes mucronis Rindge, 1978
- Semiothisa paleolata (Guenée, 1858)
- Sericoptera flavifimbria Walker, 1860
- Sphacelodes vulneraria (Hübner, 1823)
- Thyrinteina unicornis Rindge, 1961

===== Geometrinae =====
- Chloropteryx paularia (Möschler, 1886)
- Dichorda rhodocephala Prout, 1916
- Eueana niveociliaria (Herrich-Schäffer, 1870)
- Oospila confundaria (Möschler, 1890)
- Oospila decoloraria (Walker, 1861)
- Phrudocentra centrifugaria (Herrich-Schäffer, 1870)
- Phrudocentra kinstonensis Butler, 1878
- Synchlora ephippiaria Möeschler
- Synchlora frondaria Guenée, [1858]
- Synchlora herbaria (Fabricius, 1794)

===== Sterrhinae =====
- Acratodes phakellurata Guenée, 1858
- Cyclophora caducaria Möeschler, 1886
- Cyclophora conferta Warren, 1900
- Cyclophora lichenea Warren, 1900
- Cyclophora nanaria (Walker, 1861)
- Cyclophora ordinata Walker, 1862
- Cyclophora subpallida Warren, 1900
- Cyclophora urcearia Guenée, [1858]
- Euacidalia orbelia Druce, 1893
- Leptostales oblinataria (Möschler, 1890)
- Leptostales phorcaria (Guenée, [1858])
- Leptostales roseoliva Warren, 1900
- Leptostales virgota Schaus, 1901
- Lobocleta tenellata Möschler, 1886
- Pleuroprucha asthenaria (Walker, 1861)
- Scopula apparitaria (Walker, 1861)
- Scopula subquadrata (Guenée, [1858])
- Scopula umbilicata (Fabricius, 1794)
- Semaeopus argocosma Prout, 1935
- Semaeopus callichroa Prout, 1938
- Semaeopus castaria (Guenée, [1858])
- Semaeopus decalvaria Möeschler, 1886
- Semaeopus indignaria (Guenée, 1858)

===== Larentiinae =====
- Disclisioprocta stellata (Guenée, [1858])
- Dyspteris abortivaria (Herrich-Schäffer, [1855])
- Dyspteris trichophora Herbulot, 1988
- Eois decursaria Möeschler, 1886
- Eois snellenaria Möschler, 1892
- Eois tessellata Warren, 1897
- Eois trinotata Warren, 1895
- Euphyia floridata Walker, 1863
- Euphyia perturbata (Walker, 1862)
- Eupithecia succernata Möschler, 1886
- Eupithecia sucidata Möeschler, 1886
- Hammaptera parinotata (Zeller, 1872)
- Obila catocalaria Walker, 1866
- Obila pannosata (Guenée, [1858])
- Spargania dulciferata Walker, 1862
- Triphosa affirmata (Guenée, [1858])

=== Noctuoidea ===
==== Notodontidae ====
===== Notodontinae =====
- Disphragis cervina Möeschler, 1886
- Disphragis jamaicensis Schaus, 1901

===== Dudusinae =====
- Crinodes besckei Hübner, 1824

===== Heterocampinae =====
- Boriza eglossa Kaye, 1925
- Malocampa punctata (Cramer, 1782)
- Rifargia distinguenda (Walker, 1856)

===== Nystaleinae =====
- Hippia insularis (Grote, 1866)
- Nystalea collaris Schaus, 1910
- Nystalea ebalea (Stoll, 1779)
- Nystalea indiana Grote, 1884
- Nystalea nyseus (Cramer, [1775])

==== Erebidae ====
===== Arctiinae =====
- Aethria dorsolineata Hampson, 1898
- Ammalo helops (Cramer, 1775)
- Calidota strigosa (Walker, 1855)
- Carathis palpalis (Walker, 1855)
- Composia credula (Fabiricius, 1775)
- Cosmosoma achemon (Fabricius, 1781)
- Cosmosoma auge (Linnaeus, 1767)
- Cosmosoma fenestrata (Drury, 1773)
- Ctenuchidia fulvibasis Hering, 1925
- Ctenuchidia virgo (Herrich-Schäffer, [1855])
- Elysius cingulata (Walker, 1856)
- Empyreuma anassa Forbes, 1917
- Eucereon coenobita Möeschler, 1806)
- Eucereon moeschleri (Rothschild, 1912)
- Eucereon ochrota Hampson, 1905
- Eunomia rubripunctata (Butler, 1876)
- Eupseudosoma involuta (Sepp, [1855])
- Halysidota elota Möeschler, 1886
- Horama grotei Butler, 1876
- Horama panthalon (Fabricius, 1793)
- Hyalurga halizoa (Druce, 1907)
- Hyalurga vinosa (Drury, 1773)
- Hypercompe nigriplaga (Walker, 1855)
- Hypercompe persola (Möeschler, 1886)
- Idalus delicata Möeschler, 1886
- Ischnocampa griseola Rothschild, 1909
- Leucanopsis moeschleri (Rothschild, 1909)
- Lophocampa atomosa (Walker, 1855)
- Lymire melanocephala Walker, 1854
- Mulona grisea Hampson, 1900
- Nyridela chalciope (Hübner, [1831])
- Opharus bimaculata (Dewitz, 1877)
- Pachydota iodea (Herrich-Schäffer, 1855)
- Pareuchaetes insulata (Walker, 1855)
- Philoros quadricolor (Walker, 1866)
- Phoenicoprocta jamaicensis (Schaus, 1901)
- Pseudocharis minima (Grote, 1867)
- Symphlebia jamaicensis (Schaus, 1896)
- Syntomidopsis variegata (Walker, 1854)
- Uranophora chalybaea Hübner, [1831]
- Utetheisa ornatrix (Linnaeus, 1758)

===== Ctenuchiinae =====
- Correbia lycoides (Walker, 1854)
- Cyanopepla fastuosa (Walker, 1854)
- Gymnelia dubia Rothschild, 1911
- Nyridela xanthocera (Walker, 1856)
- Uraga haemorrhoa Walker, 1854

===== Pericopinae =====
- Are druryi Watson & Goodger, 1984
- Stenognatha toddi Lane & Watson, 1975

===== Lithosiinae =====
- Cincia conspersa Walker, 1854
- Cincia sordida (Möeschler, 1886)
- Parvicincia belli Field (no date)
- Paracincia butleri Field (no date)
- Paracincia dognini Field (no date)
- Amplicincia mixta (Möeschler, 1886)
- Amplicincia pallida (Butler, 1878)
- Amplicincia fletcheri Field, 1950
- Amplicincia lathyi Field, 1950
- Amplicincia walkeri Field, 1950

===== Herminiinae =====
- Berocynta simplex Möeschler, 1886
- Bleptina caradrinalis Guenée, 1854
- Bleptina menalcasalis Walker, [1859]
- Carteris oculatalis (Möschler, 1890)
- Diplodira jamaicalis Schaus, 1916
- Lascoria alucitalis (Guenée, 1854)
- Lascoria orneodalis (Guenée, 1854)
- Mastigophorus jamaicalis Möschler, 1890
- Palthis asopialis (Guenée, 1854)
- Phlyctaina irrigualis Möschler, 1890
- Physula albipunctilla Schaus, 1916
- Scopifera mirabilis Walker, 1858
- Tetanolita mutatalis (Möschler, 1890)

===== Hypeninae =====
- Ballonicha recurvata Möeschler, 1886
- Hypena abjuralis Walker, 1858
- Hypena androna (Druce, 1890)
- Hypena exoletalis Guenée, 1854
- Hypena leniusculalis Möeschler, 1886
- Hypena lunifera Butler, 1878
- Hypena minualis Guenée, 1854
- Hypena porrectalis (Fabricius, 1794)
- Hypena subidalis Guenée, 1854
- Hypena vetustalis Guenée, 1854

===== Scoliopteryginae =====
- Anomis editrix (Guenée, 1852)
- Anomis erosa Hübner, 1821
- Anomis illita Guenée, 1852
- Anomis impasta Guenée, 1852

===== Calpinae =====
- Acanthodica emittens Walker, 1857
- Dialithis gemmifera Hübner, [1821]
- Gonodonta clotilda (Stoll, 1790)
- Gonodonta incurva (Sepp, [1840])
- Gonodonta jamaicensis Barbut & Lalanne-Cassou, 2009
- Gonodonta nitidimacula Guenée, 1852
- Gonodonta nutrix (Stoll, 1780)
- Gonodonta sicheas (Cramer, 1777)
- Gonodonta uxor (Cramer, 1780)
- Plusiodonta thomae Guenée, 1852

===== Hypocalinae =====
- Hypocala andremona (Stoll, 1781)

===== Boletobiinae =====
- Metalectra analis Schaus, 1916

===== Eublemminae =====
- Eublemma cinnamomea (Herrich-Schäffer, 1868)
- Eublemma recta (Guenée, 1852)

===== Phytometrinae =====
- Aglaonice hirtipalpis Walker, 1859
- Aglaonice otignatha Hampson, 1924
- Hemeroplanis scopulepes (Haworth, 1809)
- Isogona scindens (Walker, 1858)
- Mursa phtisialis (Guenée, 1854)
- Mursa subrufa (Warren, 1889)

===== Erebinae =====
- Achaea ablunaris (Guenée, 1852)
- Argidia palmipes Guenée, 1852
- Argidia penicillata Möeschler, 1886
- Ascalapha odorata (Linnaeus, 1758)
- Calyptis iter Guenée, 1852
- Casandria ferrocana (Walker, 1857)
- Celiptera cometophora Hampson, 1913
- Celiptera levina (Stoll, 1782)
- Coenipeta bibitrix (Hübner, 1823)
- Coenipeta diffusa Walker, 1857
- Elousa albicans Walker, [1858]
- Epidromia poaphiloides Guenée, 1852
- Epidromia suffusa Walker, 1858
- Epidromia zetophora Guenée, 1852
- Euclystis angularis (Möschler, 1886)
- Gonodontodes chionosticta Hampson, 1913
- Hemeroblemma numeria (Drury, [1773])
- Hemeroblemma opigena (Drury, 1773)
- Kakopoda progenies (Guenée, 1852)
- Lesmone formularis (Zeller, 1837)
- Letis hercyna Drury, 1773
- Letis specularis Hübner, 1821
- Melipotis acontioides (Guenée, 1852)
- Melipotis agrotoides Walker, 1857
- Melipotis brunnearis Guenée, 1852
- Melipotis famelica (Guenée, 1852)
- Melipotis fasciolaris (Hübner, [1831])
- Melipotis januaris (Guenée, 1852)
- Melipotis limitata Möeschler, 1886
- Melipotis novanda Guenée, 1852
- Melipotis ochrodes (Guenée, 1852)
- Melipotis perpendicularis (Guenée, 1852)
- Metria irresoluta (Walker, 1858)
- Mocis diffluens (Guenée, 1852)
- Mocis disseverans (Walker, 1858)
- Ophisma tropicalis Guenée, 1852
- Panula inconstans Guenée, 1852
- Perasia garnoti (Guenée, 1852)
- Ptichodis herbarum Guenée, 1852
- Ptichodis immunis (Guenée, 1852)
- Selenisa sueroides (Guenée, 1852)
- Thysania zenobia (Cramer, 1777)
- Tricentrogyna vinacea Butler, 1878
- Trigonodes lucasii Guenée, 1852
- Zale fictilis (Guenée, 1852)
- Zale lunata (Drury, [1773])
- Zale plumbeolinea Hampson, 1918
- Zale rufosa Hampson, 1913
- Zale strigimacula (Guenée, 1852)

===== Eulepidotinae =====
- Antiblemma bistriga Möeschler, 1886
- Antiblemma calida Butler, 1878
- Antiblemma nannodes Hampson, 1926
- Antiblemma rufinans (Guenée, 1852)
- Anticarsia gemmatalis Hübner, 1818
- Azeta quassa Walker, 1858
- Azeta repugnalis (Hübner, 1825)
- Azeta versicolor (Fabricius, 1794)
- Azeta uncas Guenée, 1852
- Dyomyx inferior (Herrich-Schäffer, 1869)
- Epitausa coppryi (Guenée, 1852)
- Eulepidotis addens (Walker, 1858)
- Eulepidotis merricki (Holland, 1902)
- Eulepidotis metamorpha Dyar, 1914
- Eulepidotis modestula (Herrich-Schäffer, 1869)
- Eulepidotis perducens Walker, 1858
- Eulepidotis persimilis Guenée, 1852
- Massala obvertens (Walker, 1858)
- Syllectra erycata (Cramer, 1780)

==== Euteliidae ====
===== Euteliinae =====
- Eutelia ablatrix (Guenée, 1852)
- Eutelia caustiplaga Hampson, 1905
- Eutelia furcata (Walker, 1865)
- Paectes elegans Möeschler, 1890
- Paectes fuscescens Walker, 1855
- Paectes lunodes (Guenée, 1852)
- Paectes obrotunda (Guenée, 1852)
- Paectes pallida Möeschler, 1886
- Palpidia melanotricha Hampson

===== Stictopterinae =====
- Nagara vitrea (Guenée, 1852)

==== Nolidae ====
===== Chloephorinae =====
- Iscadia aperta Walker, 1857
- Iscadia metaphaea Hampson, 1918
- Iscadia mollis Möeschler, 1886

===== Collomeninae =====
- Concana mundissima Walker, [1858]

===== Afridinae =====
- Afrida mesomelaena Hampson
- Afrida tortriciformis Möeschler

==== Noctuidae ====
===== Plusiinae =====
- Argyrogramma verruca (Fabricius, 1794)
- Autoplusia illustrata (Guenée, 1852)
- Chrysodeixis includens (Walker, [1858])
- Ctenoplusia oxygramma (Geyer, 1832)
- Megalographa biloba Stephens, 1830
- Mouralia tinctoides (Guenée, 1852)
- Plusia calceolaris Walker, 1857
- Rachiplusia ou (Guenée, 1852)
- Trichoplusia ni (Hübner, [1803])

===== Bagisarinae =====
- Amyna axis (Guenée, 1852)
- Bagisara repanda (Fabricius, 1793)

===== Cydosiinae =====
- Cydosia nobilitella (Cramer, [1780])

===== Hadeninae =====
- Cephalospargeta elongata Möschler, 1890

===== Acontiinae =====
- Spragueia apicalis (Herrich-Schäffer, 1868)
- Spragueia dama (Guenée, 1852)
- Spragueia margana (Fabricius, 1794)
- Spragueia perstructana (Walker, 1865)
- Tarache tetragona (Walker, [1858])

===== Diphtherinae =====
- Diphthera festiva (Fabricius, 1775)

===== Amphipyrinae =====
- Araeopteron acidalica Hampson, 1910
- Archanara oblonga Grote, 1882
- Argyrosticta ditissima Walker, 1857
- Cropia indigna (Walker, [1858])
- Cropia infusa (Walker, [1858])
- Cropia minthe Dyar, 1889
- Cropia subapicalis (Walker, 1858)
- Galgula subapicalis Hampson, 1909
- Heterochroma berylloides Hampson, 1908
- Heterochroma insignis Walker, 1857
- Lithacodia glauca Hampson, 1910
- Macapta albivitta Hampson, 1910
- Thioptera aurifera Walker, 1858

===== Oncocnemidinae =====
- Antachara diminuta (Guenée, 1852)
- Neogalea sunia (Guenée, 1852)

===== Agaristinae =====
- Caularis jamaicensis Todd, 1966
- Caularis undulans (Walker, [1858])
- Euscirrhopterus poeyi Grote, 1866

===== Condicinae =====
- Condica abida Felder & Rogenhofer, 1874
- Condica albigera (Guenée, 1852)
- Condica circuita (Guenée, 1852)
- Condica concisa (Walker, 1856)
- Condica confederata (Grote, 1873)
- Condica cupentia (Cramer, 1780)
- Condica mobilis (Walker, [1857])
- Condica punctifera (Walker, [1857])
- Condica selenosa Guenée, 1852
- Condica subornata Walker, 1865
- Condica sutor (Guenée, 1852)
- Micrathetis dasarada (Druce, 1898)
- Micrathetis triplex (Walker, 1857)
- Perigea punctirena Walker, 1857
- Perigea xanthioides Guenée, 1852

===== Heliothinae =====
- Helicoverpa zea (Boddie, 1850)
- Heliothis lucilinea Walker, 1858
- Heliothis virescens (Fabricius, 1777)

===== Eriopinae =====
- Callopistria jamaicensis (Möschler, 1886)

===== Noctuinae =====
- Acroria terens (Walker, 1857)
- Agrotis malefida Guenée, 1852
- Agrotis repleta Walker, 1857
- Anicla infecta (Ochsenheimer, 1816)
- Barcita subviridescens Walker, 1858
- Boryzops purissima Dyar, 1910
- Bryolymnia floccifera Möeschler, 1886
- Elaphria agrotina (Guenée, 1852)
- Elaphria basistigma Walker, 1858
- Elaphria chalcedonia (Hübner, 1803)
- Elaphria deltoides (Möschler, 1880)
- Elaphria devara (Druce, 1898)
- Elaphria nucicolora (Guenée, 1852)
- Elaphria subobliqua (Walker, 1858)
- Eriopyga crista Walker, 1856
- Feltia subterranea (Fabricius, 1794)
- Galgula partita Guenée, 1852
- Gonodes liquida (Möschler, 1886)
- Lacinipolia distributa (Möschler, 1886)
- Leucania chejela (Schaus, 1921)
- Leucania clarescens Möschler, 1890
- Leucania dorsalis Walker, 1856
- Leucania educata Adams, 2001
- Leucania humidicola Guenée, 1852
- Leucania incognita (Barnes & McDunnough, 1918)
- Leucania inconspicua Herrich-Schäffer, 1868
- Leucania latiuscula Herrich-Schäffer, 1868
- Leucania lobrega Adams, 2001
- Leucania rawlinsi Adams, 2001
- Leucania secta Herrich-Schäffer, 1868
- Leucania senescens Möschler, 1890
- Magusa orbifera (Walker, 1857)
- Mamestra soligena Möschler, 1886
- Marilopteryx lamptera (Druce, 1890)
- Mythimna sequax (Franclemont, 1951)
- Mythimna unipuncta (Haworth, 1809)
- Neophaenis meterythra Hampson, 1908
- Neophaenis respondens (Walker, 1858)
- Orthodes jamaicensis Hampson, 1905
- Orthodes vesquesa (Dyar, 1913)
- Peridroma saucia (Hübner, [1808])
- Pseudyrias dufayi Schaus, 1933
- Spodoptera albula (Walker, 1859)
- Spodoptera androgea (Stoll, 1782)
- Spodoptera dolichos (Fabricius, 1794)
- Spodoptera eridania (Stoll, 1782)
- Spodoptera frugiperda (Smith, 1797)
- Spodoptera latifascia (Walker, 1856)
- Spodoptera ornithogalli (Guenée, 1852)
- Spodoptera pulchella (Herrich-Schäffer, 1868)
- Tiracola grandirena (Herrich-Schäffer, 1868)
- Xanthopastis regnatrix (Grote, 1863)
