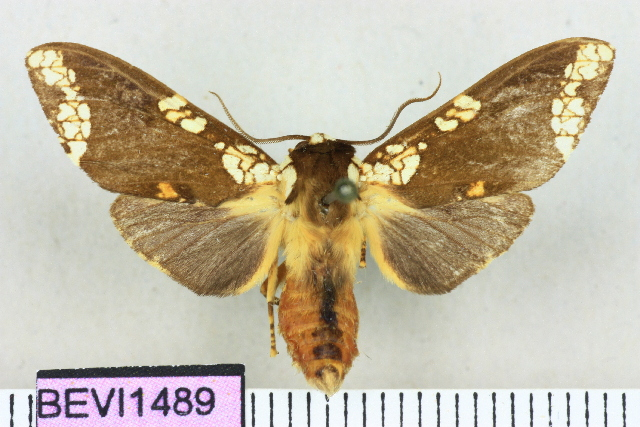

Scientific classification
- Kingdom: Animalia
- Phylum: Arthropoda
- Class: Insecta
- Order: Lepidoptera
- Superfamily: Noctuoidea
- Family: Erebidae
- Subfamily: Arctiinae
- Genus: Carathis
- Species: C. gortynoides

Binomial name
- Carathis gortynoides Grote, [1866]

= Carathis gortynoides =

Species of moth

Carathis gortynoides is a moth of the family Erebidae first described by Augustus Radcliffe Grote in 1866. It is found on Cuba.
