= Carathis australis =

Scientific classification
- Domain: Eukaryota
- Kingdom: Animalia
- Phylum: Arthropoda
- Class: Insecta
- Order: Lepidoptera
- Superfamily: Noctuoidea
- Family: Erebidae
- Subfamily: Arctiinae
- Genus: Carathis
- Species: C. australis

Binomial name
- Carathis australis Rothschild, 1909

Species of moth

Carathis australis is a moth of the family Erebidae first described by Walter Rothschild in 1909. It is found in Brazil.
