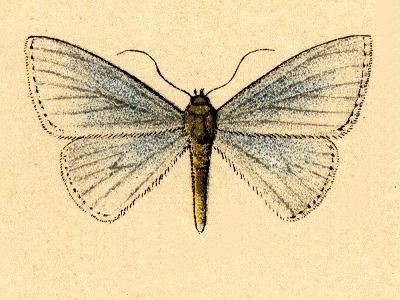
- Zanclopteryx uniferata

Scientific classification
- Kingdom: Animalia
- Phylum: Arthropoda
- Class: Insecta
- Order: Lepidoptera
- Family: Geometridae
- Subfamily: Oenochrominae
- Genus: Zanclopteryx; Herrich-Schaffer, 1855

Synonyms
- Gasmara Walker, 1863

= Zanclopteryx =

Genus of moths

Zanclopteryx is a genus of moths in the family Geometridae.

== Species ==
- Zanclopteryx aculeataria Herrich-Schaffer, 1855
- Zanclopteryx conspersa Warren, 1908
- Zanclopteryx floccosa Warren, 1897
- Zanclopteryx mexicana Prout, 1910
- Zanclopteryx punctiferata Prout, 1910
- Zanclopteryx subsimilis Warren, 1897
- Zanclopteryx uniferata (Walker, 1863)
- Zanclopteryx venata Warren, 1897
