= Amplicincia =

Scientific classification
- Domain: Eukaryota
- Kingdom: Animalia
- Phylum: Arthropoda
- Class: Insecta
- Order: Lepidoptera
- Superfamily: Noctuoidea
- Family: Erebidae
- Subfamily: Arctiinae
- Tribe: Lithosiini
- Genus: Amplicincia; Field, 1950

Genus of moths

Amplicincia is a genus of moths in the subfamily Arctiinae described by William D. Field in 1950.

== Species ==
- Amplicincia fletcheri Field, 1950
- Amplicincia lathyi Field, 1950
- Amplicincia mixta Möschler, 1886
- Amplicincia pallida Butler, 1878
- Amplicincia walkeri Field, 1950
