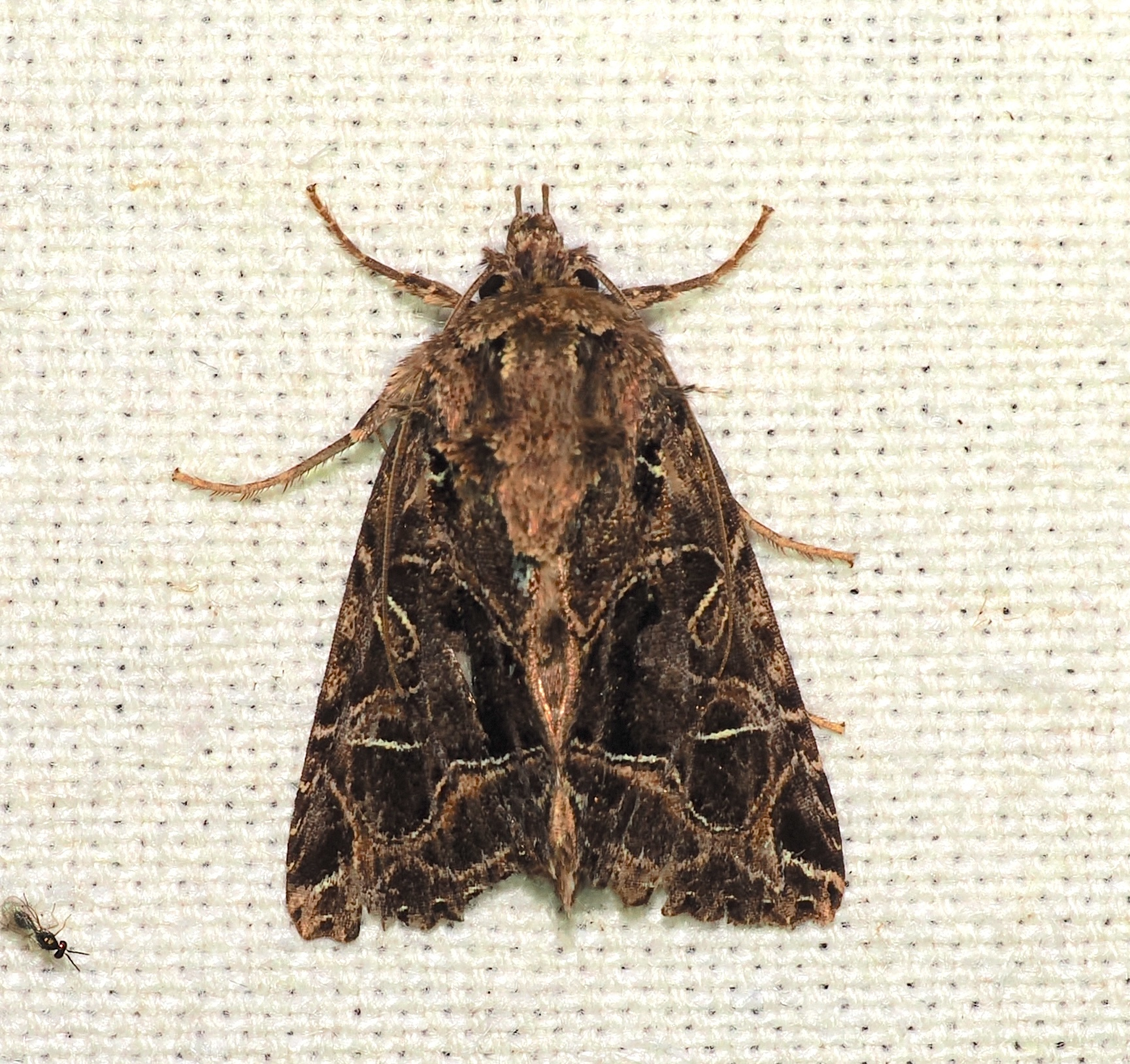
- Heterochroma amphion

Scientific classification
- Kingdom: Animalia
- Phylum: Arthropoda
- Class: Insecta
- Order: Lepidoptera
- Superfamily: Noctuoidea
- Family: Noctuidae
- Genus: Heterochroma; Guenée in Boisduval & Guenée, 1852

= Heterochroma =

Genus of moths

Heterochroma is a genus of moths of the family Noctuidae. The genus was erected by Achille Guenée in 1852.

== Species ==
- Heterochroma albipuncta E. D. Jones, 1908
- Heterochroma amphion (Druce, 1889)
- Heterochroma bellona (Felder, 1874)
- Heterochroma berylloides Hampson, 1908
- Heterochroma beryllus (Guenée, 1852)
- Heterochroma celestina Schaus, 1921
- Heterochroma chlorographa Hampson, 1908
- Heterochroma eriopioides Guenée, 1852
- Heterochroma exundata Schaus, 1911
- Heterochroma hadenoides Guenée, 1852
- Heterochroma hypatia (Druce, 1889)
- Heterochroma insignis (Walker, 1857)
- Heterochroma ligata Schaus, 1911
- Heterochroma lineata (Druce, 1898)
- Heterochroma luma (Druce, 1889)
- Heterochroma metallica (H. Edwards, 1884)
- Heterochroma quadrata (Dognin, 1910)
- Heterochroma rollia Schaus, 1921
- Heterochroma sarepta (Druce, 1889)
- Heterochroma singularis (Butler, 1879)
- Heterochroma thermeola Hampson, 1911
- Heterochroma thermida Hampson, 1908
- Heterochroma thermographa Hampson, 1910
- Heterochroma viridipicta Schaus, 1911
