= Nonia belizae =

Scientific classification
- Domain: Eukaryota
- Kingdom: Animalia
- Phylum: Arthropoda
- Class: Insecta
- Order: Lepidoptera
- Family: Pyralidae
- Genus: Nonia
- Species: N. belizae

Binomial name
- Nonia belizae Neunzig & Dow, 1993

Species of moth

Nonia belizae is a species of snout moth in the genus Nonia. It was described by Herbert H. Neunzig and L. C. Dow in 1993 and is known from Belize (including San Ignacio, the type location).
