= Carathis byblis =

Scientific classification
- Domain: Eukaryota
- Kingdom: Animalia
- Phylum: Arthropoda
- Class: Insecta
- Order: Lepidoptera
- Superfamily: Noctuoidea
- Family: Erebidae
- Subfamily: Arctiinae
- Genus: Carathis
- Species: C. byblis

Binomial name
- Carathis byblis (Schaus, 1892)

Synonyms
- Ameles byblis Schaus, 1892; Carathis melamera Dognin, 1916

Species of moth

Carathis byblis is a moth of the family Erebidae first described by William Schaus in 1892. It is found in Brazil, Costa Rica and Guatemala.
