= Carathis septentrionalis =

Scientific classification
- Domain: Eukaryota
- Kingdom: Animalia
- Phylum: Arthropoda
- Class: Insecta
- Order: Lepidoptera
- Superfamily: Noctuoidea
- Family: Erebidae
- Subfamily: Arctiinae
- Genus: Carathis
- Species: C. septentrionalis

Binomial name
- Carathis septentrionalis Becker, 2011

Species of moth

Carathis septentrionalis is a moth of the family Erebidae first described by Vitor Osmar Becker in 2011. It is found in Costa Rica.
