= Caularis =

- Caularis lunata

Scientific classification
- Kingdom: Animalia
- Phylum: Arthropoda
- Class: Insecta
- Order: Lepidoptera
- Superfamily: Noctuoidea
- Family: Noctuidae
- Subfamily: Agaristinae
- Genus: Caularis; Walker, [1858]

Genus of moths

Caularis is a genus of moths of the family Noctuidae.

== Species ==
- Caularis jamaicensis Todd, 1966
- Caularis lunata Hampson, 1904
- Caularis undulans Walker, [1858]
