= Nonia =

Scientific classification
- Domain: Eukaryota
- Kingdom: Animalia
- Phylum: Arthropoda
- Class: Insecta
- Order: Lepidoptera
- Family: Pyralidae
- Subfamily: Phycitinae
- Genus: Nonia; Hampson in Ragonot, 1901

Synonyms
- Hypermescinia Dyar, 1914

Genus of moths

Nonia is a genus of snout moths described by George Hampson in 1901.

== Species ==
- Nonia belizae Neunzig & Dow, 1993
- Nonia exiguella (Ragonot, 1888)
