= Cincia =

Scientific classification
- Kingdom: Animalia
- Phylum: Arthropoda
- Class: Insecta
- Order: Lepidoptera
- Superfamily: Noctuoidea
- Family: Erebidae
- Subfamily: Arctiinae
- Tribe: Lithosiini
- Genus: Cincia; Walker, 1854
- Species: C. conspersa

Binomial name
- Cincia conspersa Walker, 1854

Synonyms
- Autoceras sordida Möschler, 1886

Genus of moths

Cincia is a monotypic moth genus in the subfamily Arctiinae. Its only species, Cincia conspersa, is found on Jamaica. Both the genus and species were first described by Francis Walker in 1854.

== Former species ==
- Cincia pallida, now Amplicincia pallida (Butler, 1878)
