= Paracincia =

Scientific classification
- Domain: Eukaryota
- Kingdom: Animalia
- Phylum: Arthropoda
- Class: Insecta
- Order: Lepidoptera
- Superfamily: Noctuoidea
- Family: Erebidae
- Subfamily: Arctiinae
- Tribe: Lithosiini
- Genus: Paracincia; Field, 1950

Genus of moths

Paracincia is a genus of moths in the subfamily of Arctiinae. The genus was erected by William Dewitt Field in 1950.

== Species ==
- Paracincia butleri Field, 1950
- Paracincia dognini Field, 1950
