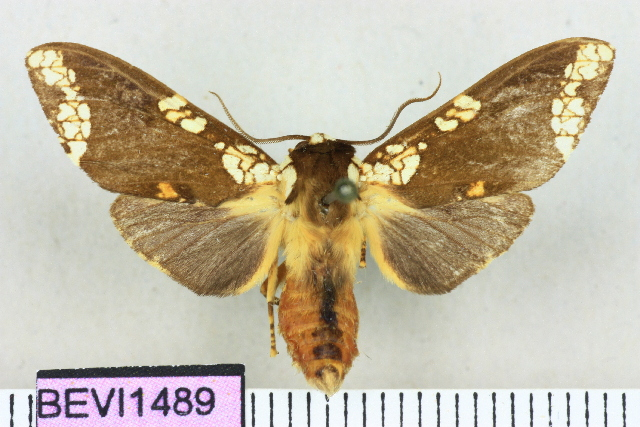
- Carathis gortynoides

Scientific classification
- Kingdom: Animalia
- Phylum: Arthropoda
- Class: Insecta
- Order: Lepidoptera
- Superfamily: Noctuoidea
- Family: Erebidae
- Subfamily: Arctiinae
- Subtribe: Phaegopterina
- Genus: Carathis; Grote, [1866]

= Carathis =

Genus of moths

Carathis is a genus of moths in the family Erebidae. The genus was described by Augustus Radcliffe Grote in 1866.

== Species ==
- Carathis alayorum Becker, 2011
- Carathis australis Rothschild, 1909
- Carathis byblis (Schaus, 1892)
- Carathis gortynoides Grote, [1866]
- Carathis palpalis (Walker, 1855)
- Carathis septentrionalis Becker, 2011

== Former species ==
- Carathis klagesi, now Tessella klagesi (Rothschild, 1909)
