= Carathis alayorum =

Scientific classification
- Kingdom: Animalia
- Phylum: Arthropoda
- Class: Insecta
- Order: Lepidoptera
- Superfamily: Noctuoidea
- Family: Erebidae
- Subfamily: Arctiinae
- Genus: Carathis
- Species: C. alayorum

Binomial name
- Carathis alayorum Becker, 2011

Species of moth

Carathis alayorum is a moth of the family Erebidae first described by Vitor Osmar Becker in 2011. It is found on Cuba.
