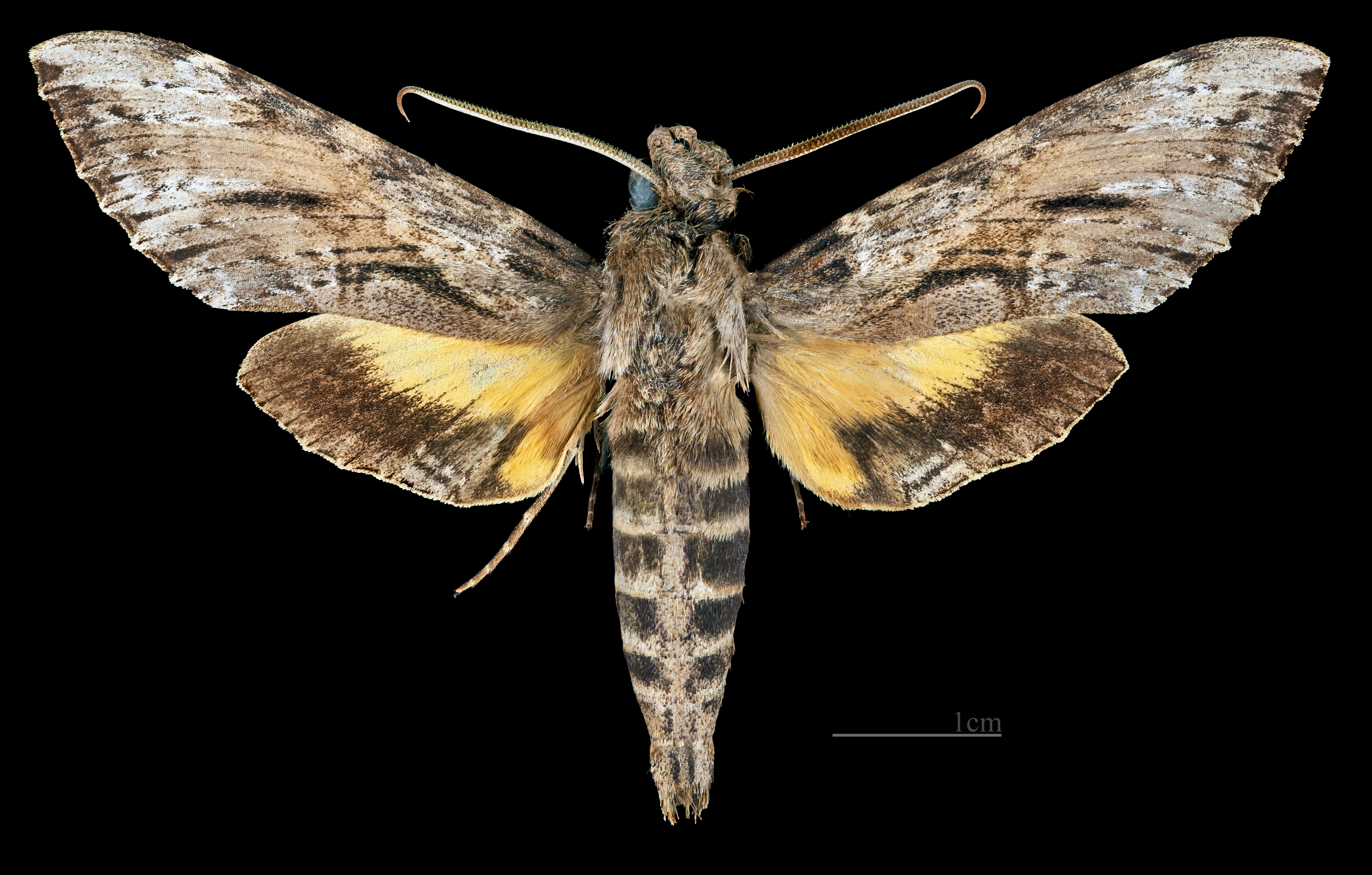
- Isognathus rimosa rimosa male dorsal
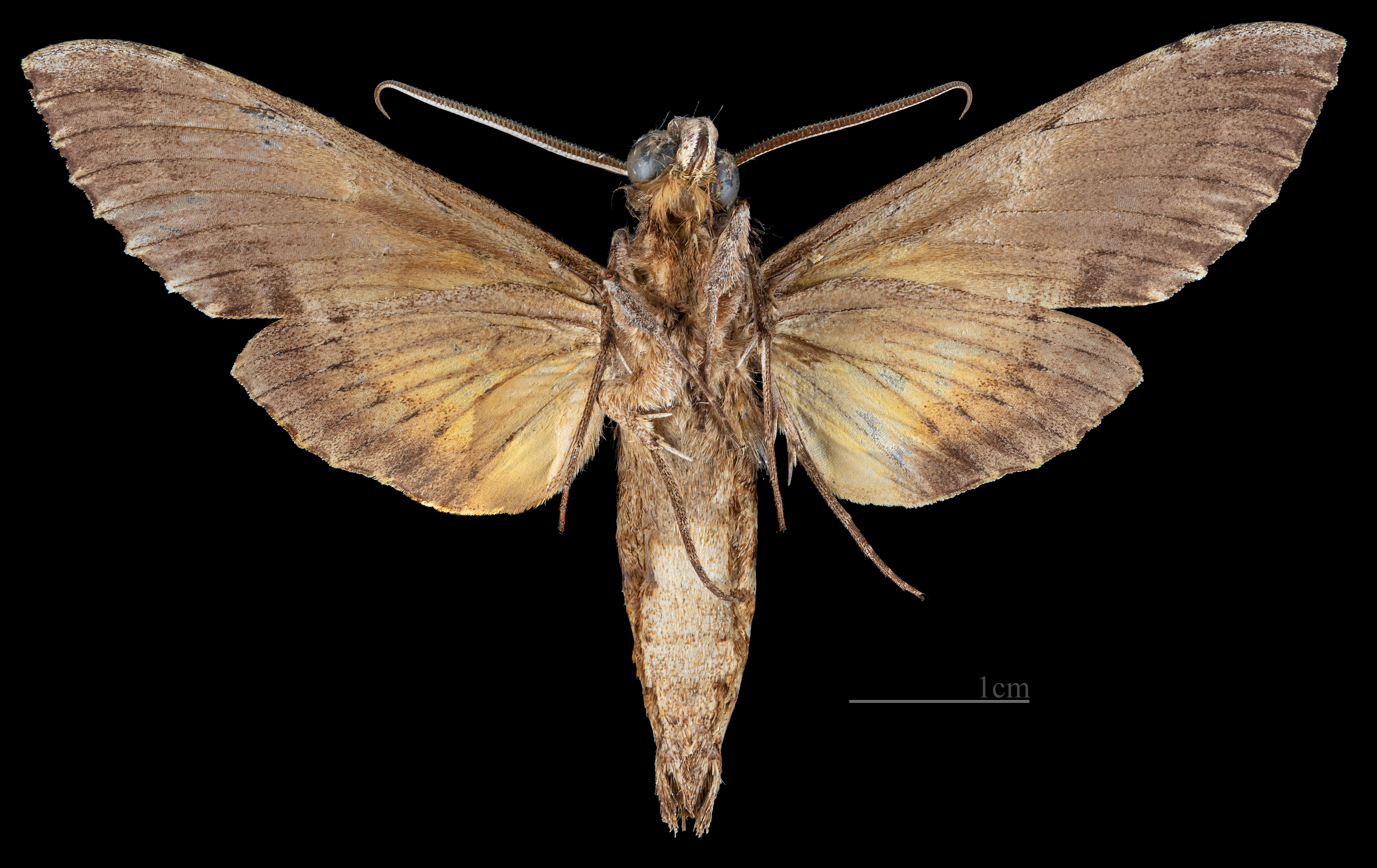
- Isognathus rimosa rimosa male ventral

Scientific classification
- Domain: Eukaryota
- Kingdom: Animalia
- Phylum: Arthropoda
- Class: Insecta
- Order: Lepidoptera
- Family: Sphingidae
- Genus: Isognathus
- Species: I. rimosa

Binomial name
- Isognathus rimosa (Grote, 1865)

Synonyms
- Erinnyis rimosa Grote, 1865; Erinnyis congratulans Grote, 1865; Anceryx pelops Boisduval, 1875; Anceryx mnechus Herrich-Schäffer, 1863; Anceryx andae Grote & Robinson, 1868; Anceryx silenus Grote & Robinson, 1868; Isognathus laura Butler, 1876; Isognathus rimosa woodi Ramsden, 1916; Anceryx rimosa papayae Boisduval, 1875

= Isognathus rimosa =

Rimosus sphinx

Species of moth

Isognathus rimosa, the rimosus sphinx, is a moth of the family Sphingidae. The species was first described by Augustus Radcliffe Grote in 1865.

== Distribution ==
It is known from tropical climates from northern Brazil north through Central America, the West Indies and Mexico to southern Arizona.

== Description ==
The wingspan is 70–102 mm.

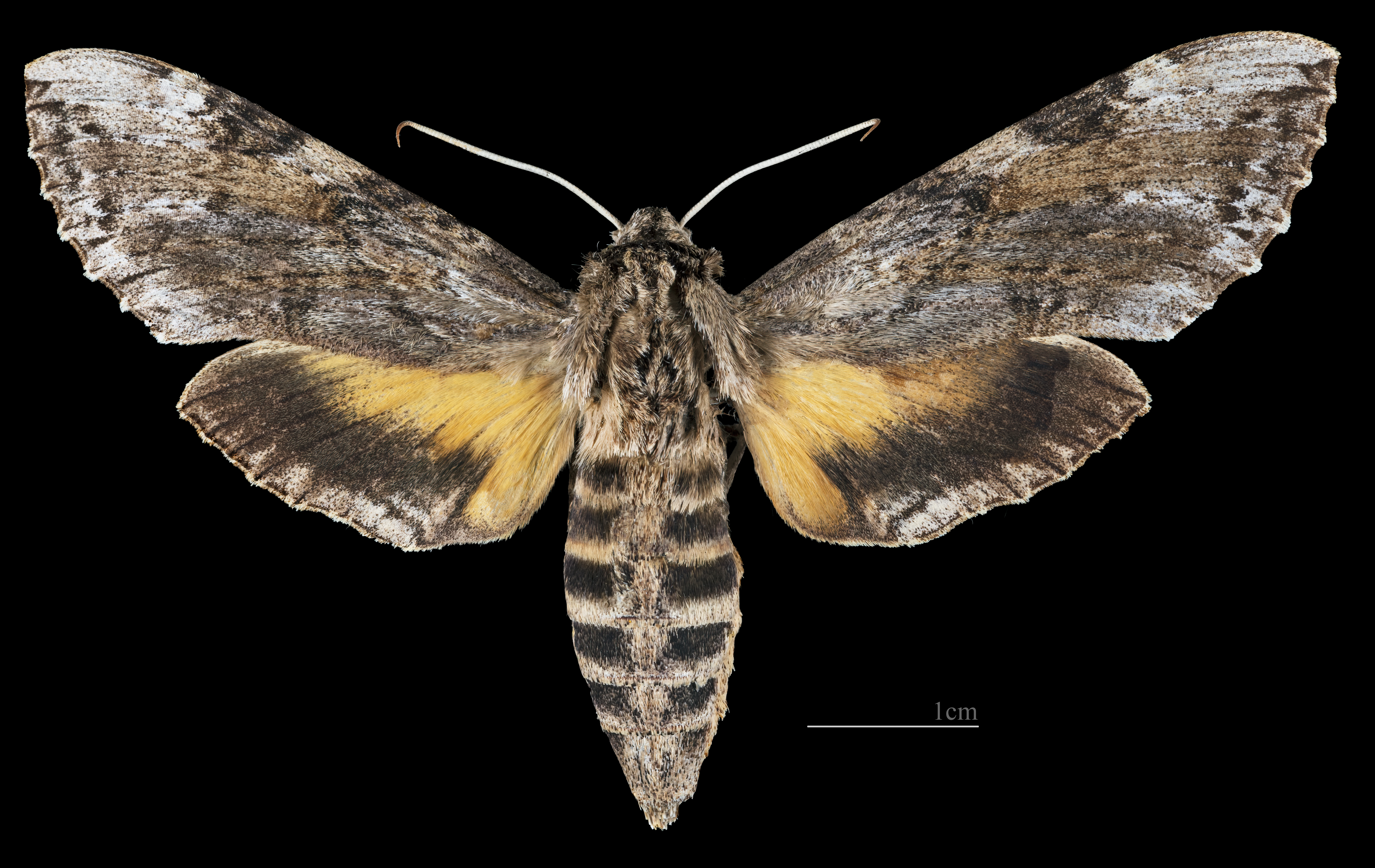
Female - Dorsal side

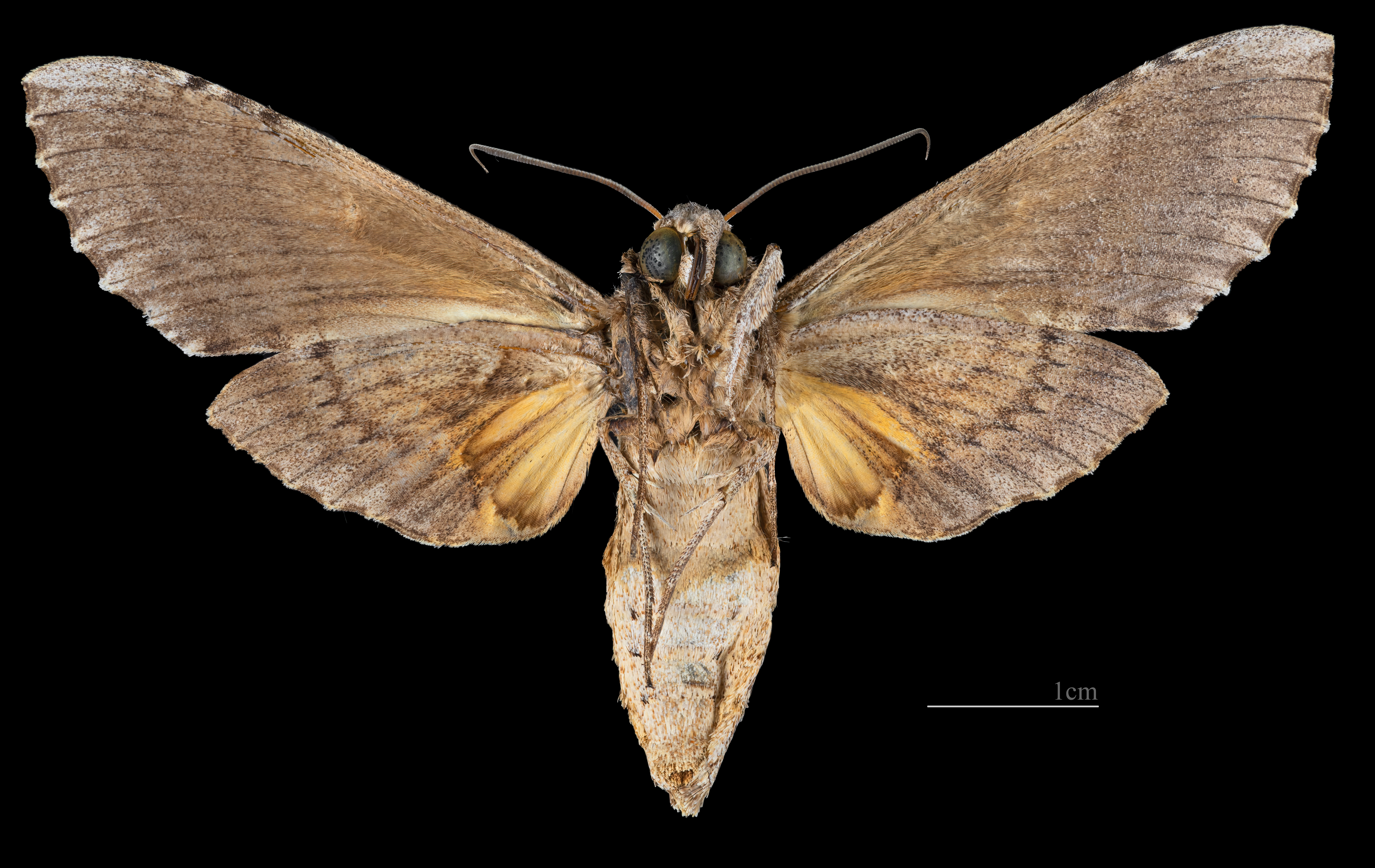
Female - △ Ventral side

== Biology ==
There are multiple generations per year in the tropics. In Arizona, adults have been recorded in August. They feed on flower nectar, including petunias.

The larvae have been recorded feeding on Plumeria rubra in Cuba and Plumeria alba, Plumeria obtusa and Plumeria rubra in Puerto Rico.

== Subspecies ==
- Isognathus rimosa rimosa (northern Brazil north through Central America, the West Indies and Mexico to southern Arizona)
- Isognathus rimosa inclitus Edwards, 1887 (Mexico to Nicaragua)
- Isognathus rimosa jamaicensis Rothschild & Jordan, 1915 (Jamaica)
- Isognathus rimosa molitor Rothschild & Jordan, 1915 (Haiti)
- Isognathus rimosa papayae (Boisduval, 1875) (French Guiana and from Venezuela to Brazil)
- Isognathus rimosa wolcotti Clark, 1922 (Puerto Rico)
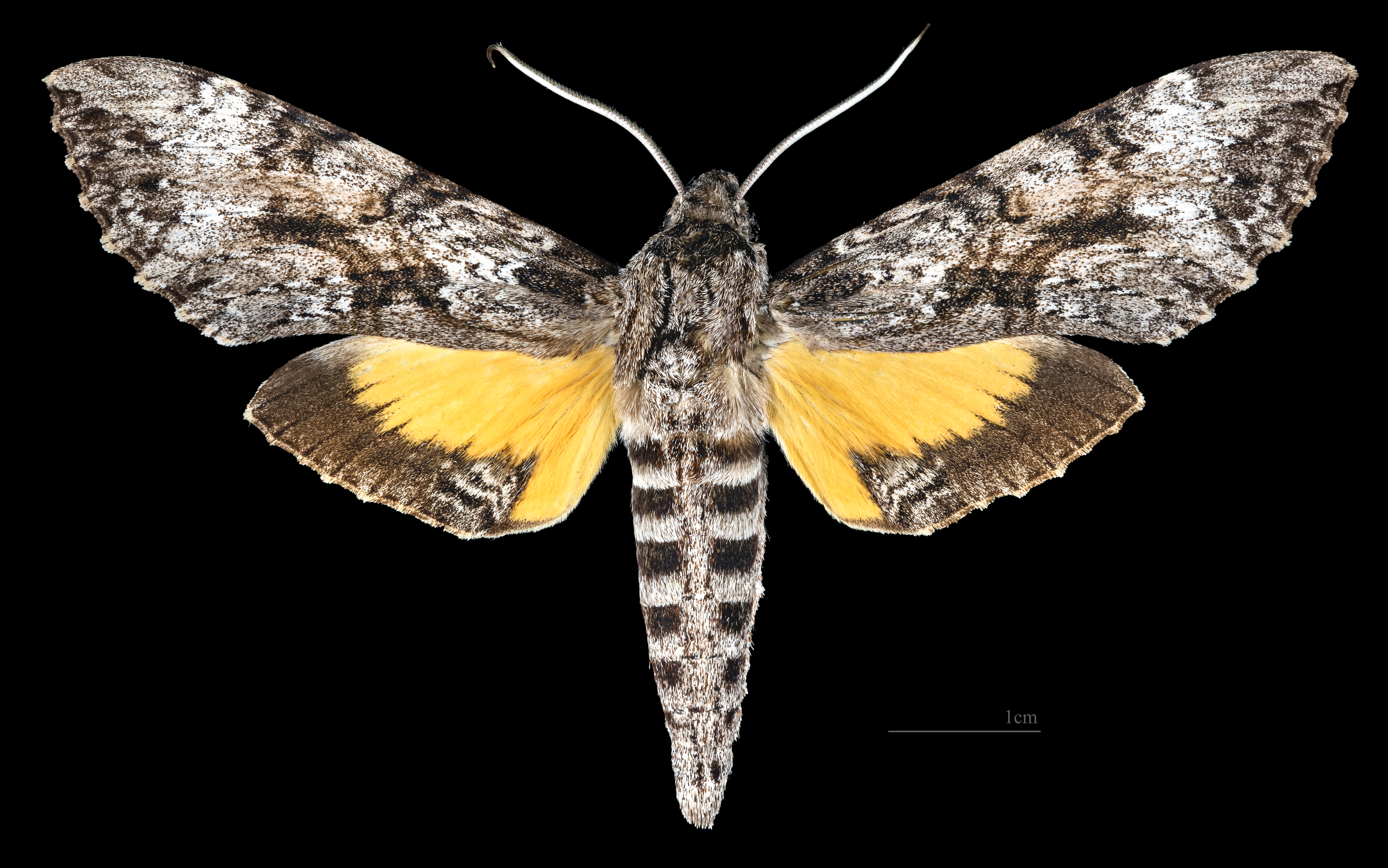
Isognathus rimosa inclitus Male dorsal side

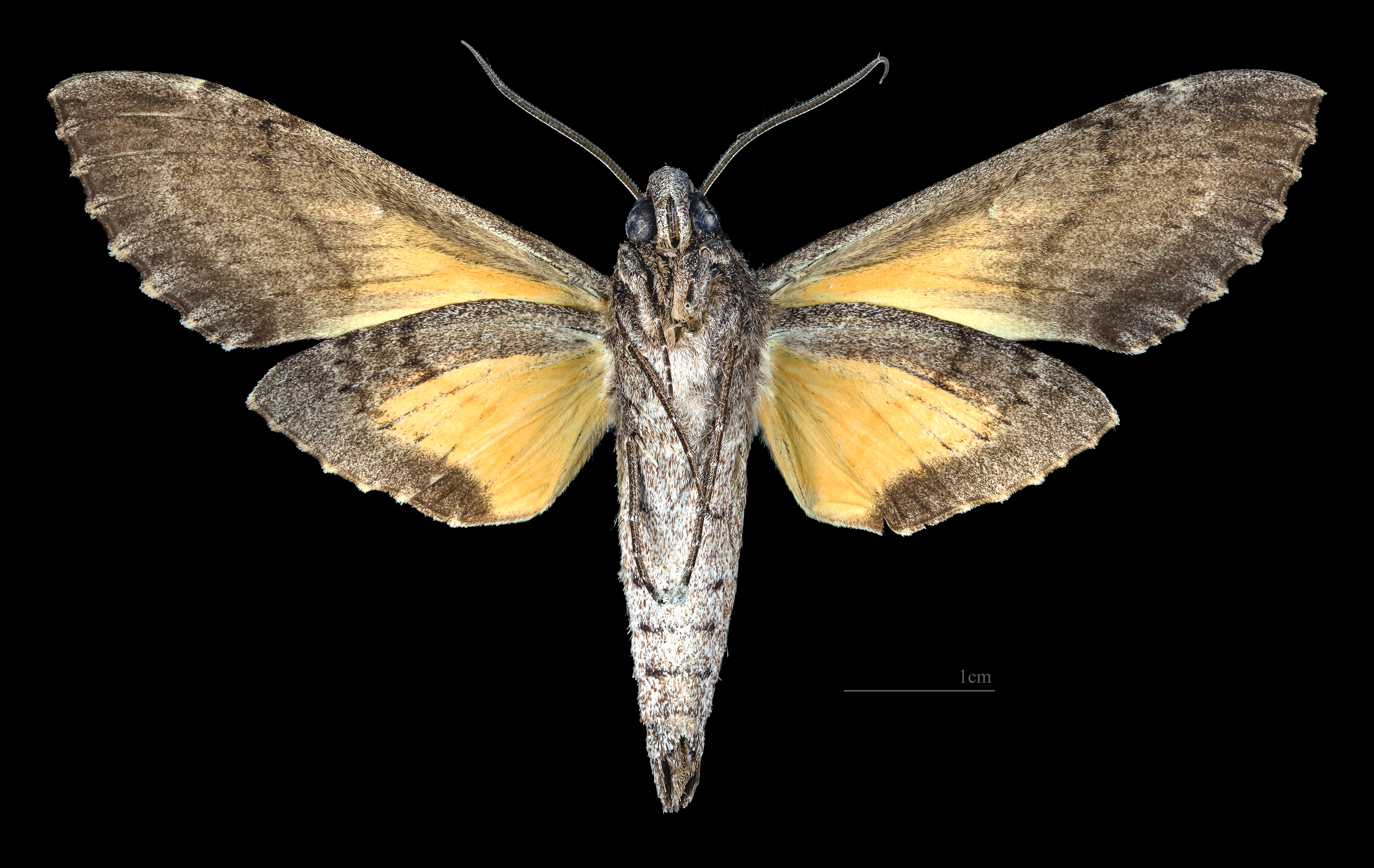
Isognathus rimosa inclitus Male △ Ventral side

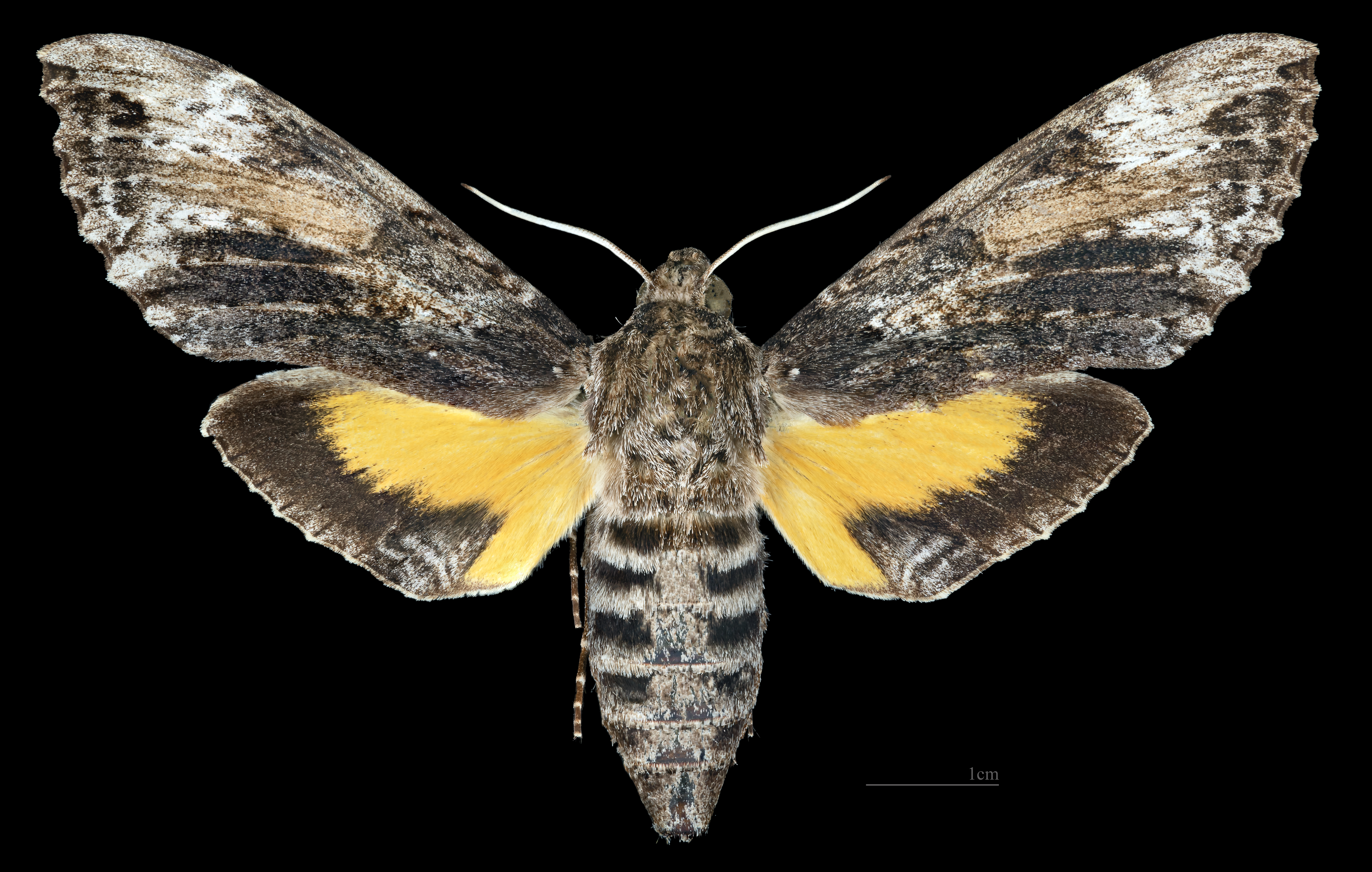
Isognathus rimosa inclitus Female dorsal

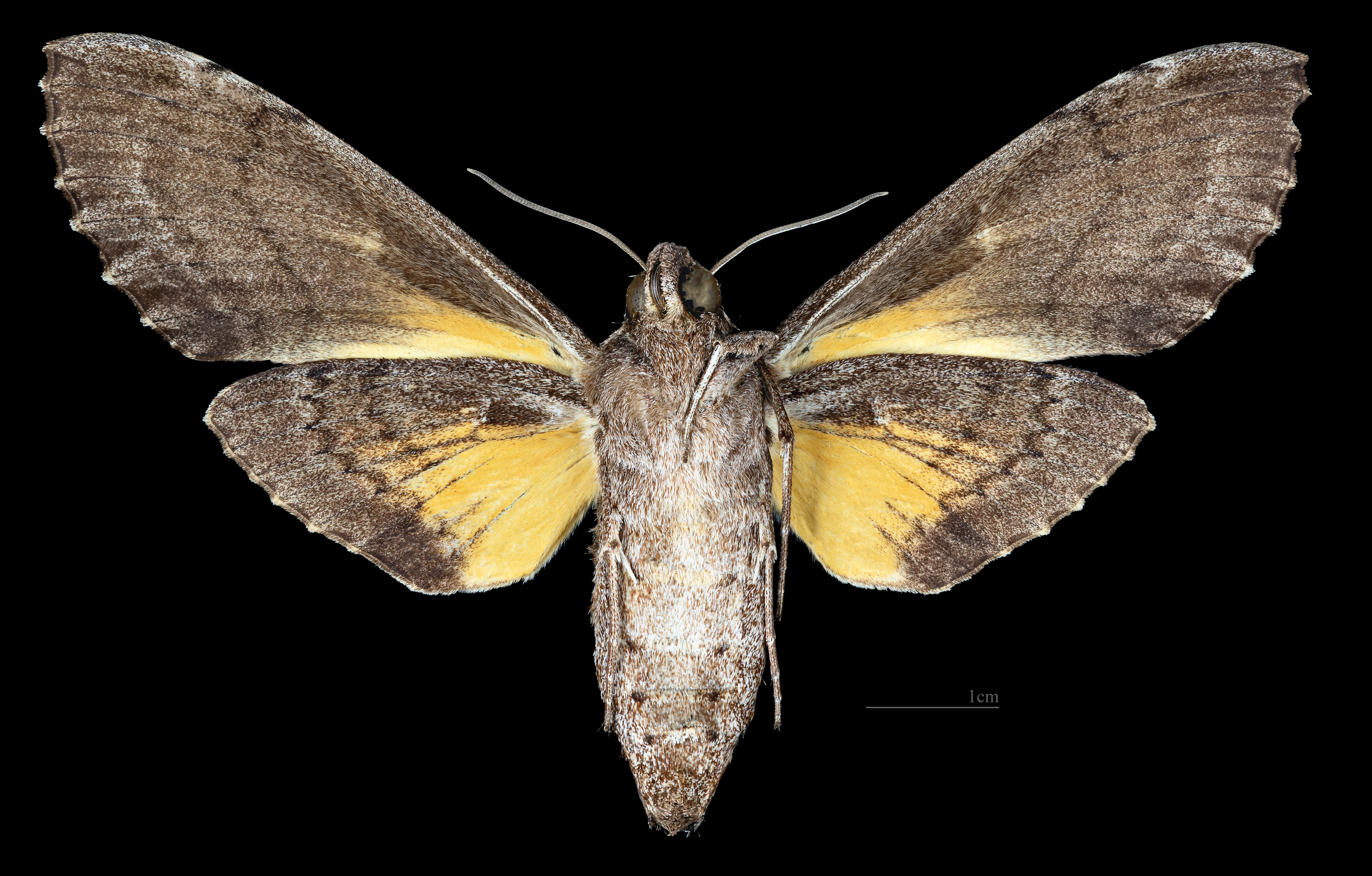
Isognathus rimosa inclitus Female ventral
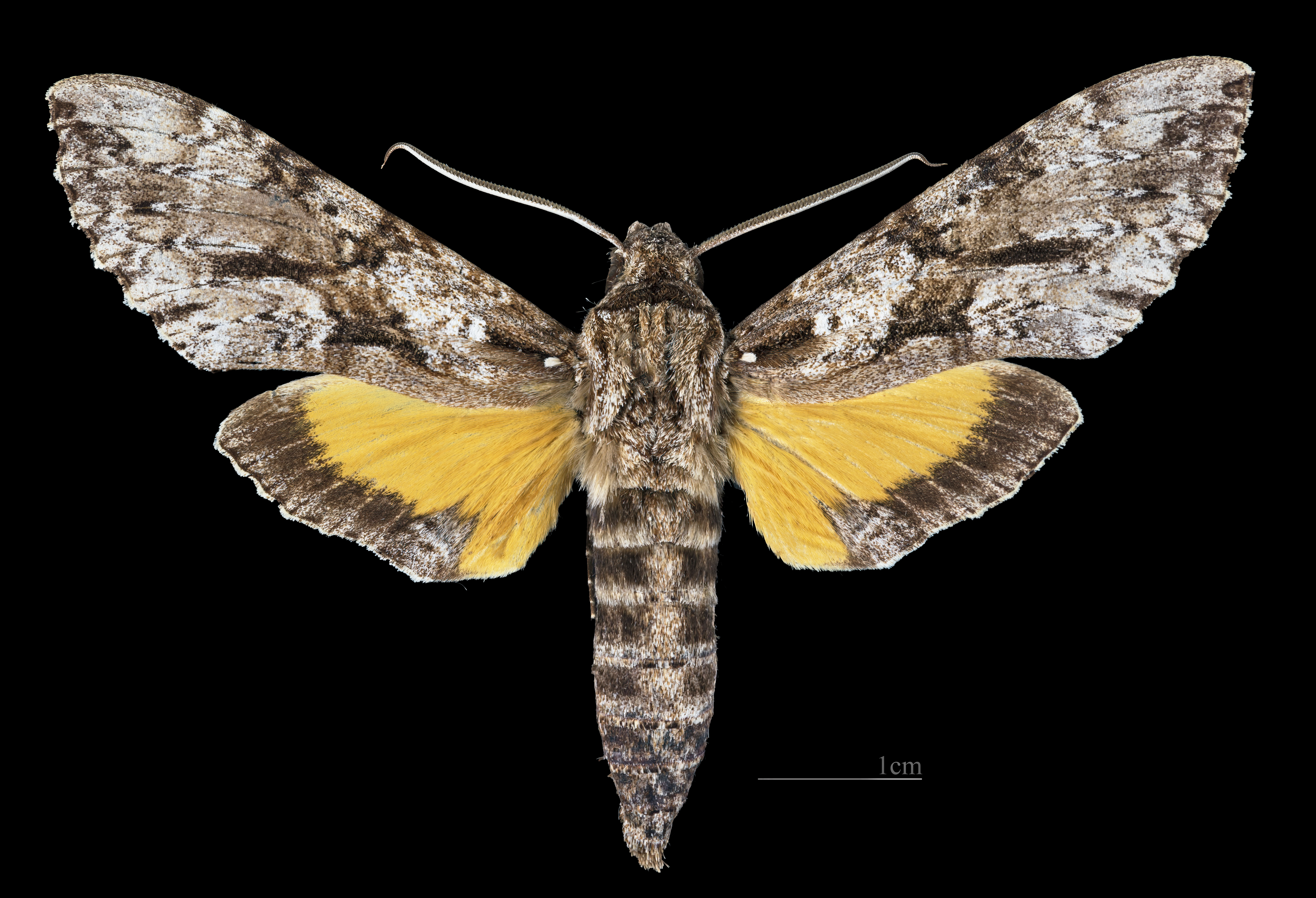
Isognathus rimosa papayae ♂

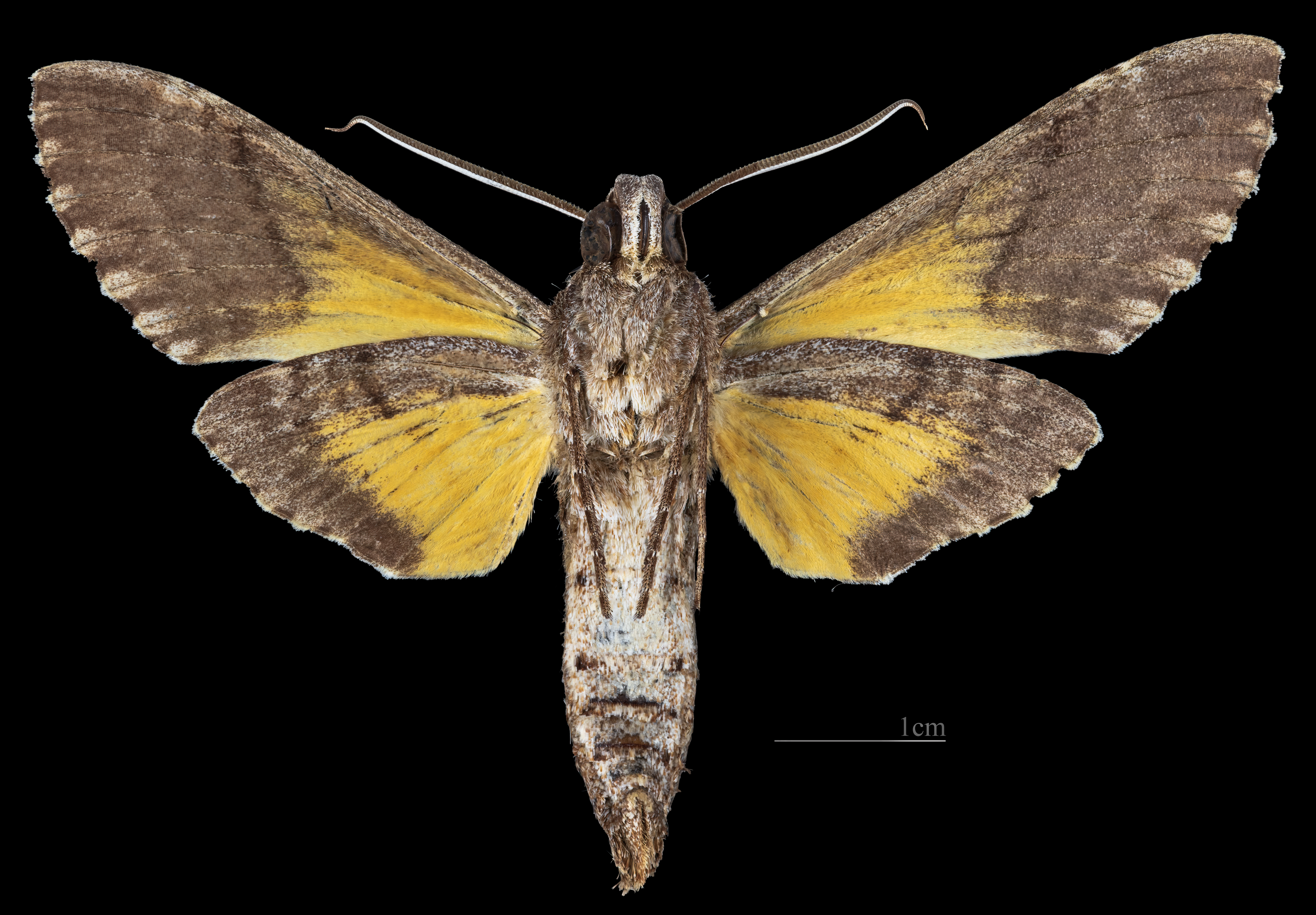
Isognathus rimosa papayae ♂ △

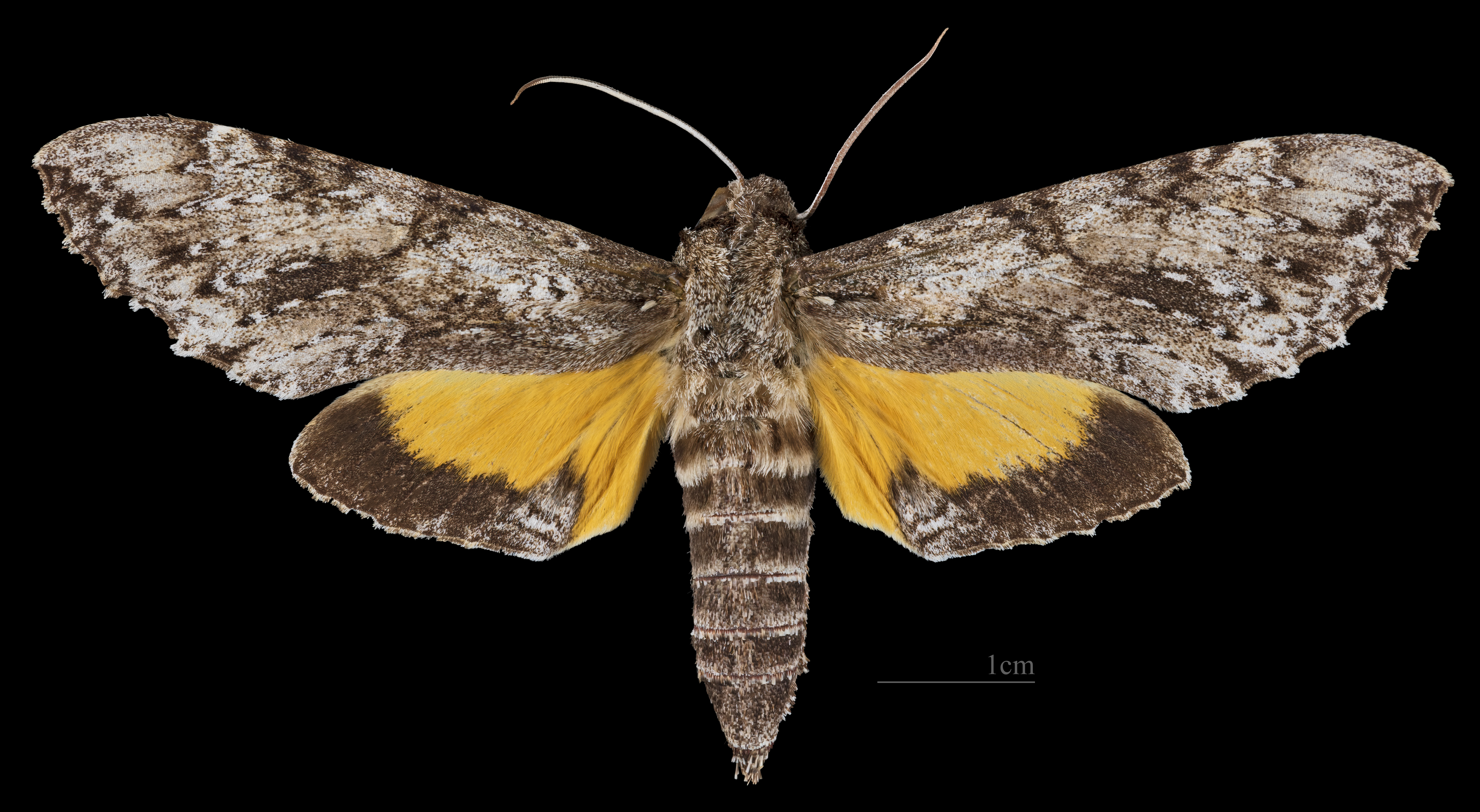
Isognathus rimosa papayae ♀

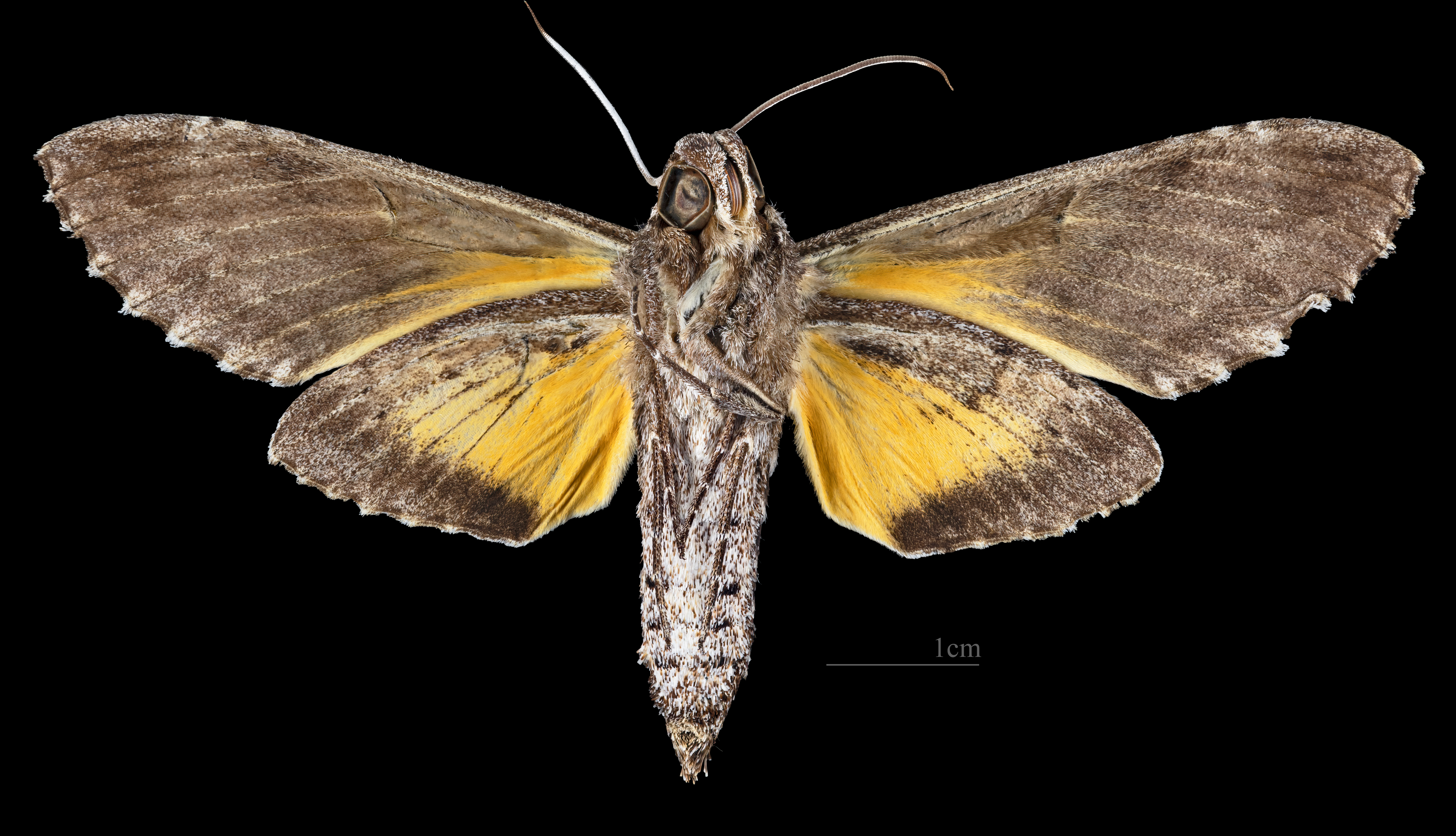
Isognathus rimosa papayae ♀ △
