= Eois tessellata =

Scientific classification
- Kingdom: Animalia
- Phylum: Arthropoda
- Clade: Pancrustacea
- Class: Insecta
- Order: Lepidoptera
- Family: Geometridae
- Genus: Eois
- Species: E. tessellata

Binomial name
- Eois tessellata (Warren, 1897)

Synonyms
- Cambogia tessellata Warren, 1897

Species of moth

Eois tessellata is a moth in the family Geometridae. It is found on Jamaica.
