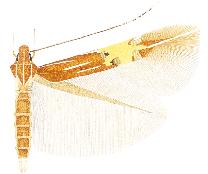

Scientific classification
- Kingdom: Animalia
- Phylum: Arthropoda
- Clade: Pancrustacea
- Class: Insecta
- Order: Lepidoptera
- Family: Cosmopterigidae
- Genus: Cosmopterix
- Species: C. floridanella

Binomial name
- Cosmopterix floridanella Beutenmüller, 1889

Synonyms
- Cosmopteryx nigrapunctella Busck, 1900

= Cosmopterix floridanella =

Species of moth

Cosmopterix floridanella is a moth of the family Cosmopterigidae. It is found in the United States (Florida, Arkansas, Mississippi, Tennessee, Louisiana, Alabama), the Cayman Islands (Grand Cayman), Cuba, Jamaica and the US Virgin Islands (St. Croix).

Adults have been collected from April towards May in the United States and from December to May in Jamaica, the Cayman Islands including the US Virgin Islands. There are at least two generations per year.

== Description ==
The measurements of the moths differ between male and female specimens.

Forewing length: 3.1-3.9 mm. Head: Front shining white with greenish and purplish reflections. Vertex and neck tufts: Shining greyish ochreous with reddish gloss, laterally- and medially-lined white. Collar: Greyish ochreous.

Labial palpus: First segment is very short, white, second segment three-quarters of the length of third, pale ochreous with white longitudinal lines laterally and ventrally, third segment white, dark brown lined laterally.

Scape: Dark brown with a white anterior line, ventrally white, antenna dark brown with a white line from base to beyond one-half, followed towards apex by an annulated section of four segments, four white, two dark brown, two white, two dark brown, one white, three dark brown, two white, two dark brown and eight white segments at apex.

Thorax and tegulae: Greyish ochreous, thorax with a white median line, tegulae lined white inwardly.

Legs: Dark brownish grey. Femora of midleg and hindleg shining white, foreleg with a white line on tibia and tarsal segments, tibia of midleg with white oblique basal and medial lines and a white apical ring, tarsal segments ochreous-white except base of segment one dorsally and segment four, tibia of hindleg as midleg, tarsal segments ochreous-white, spurs white dorsally, brownish grey ventrally.

Forewing: Greyish ochreous, five white lines in the basal area, a short and broad costal from one-quarter to the transverse fascia, a subcostal from base to one-quarter, slightly bending from costa, a medial above fold, from one-fifth to two-fifths, a subdorsal from one-quarter almost to the transverse fascia, a narrow dorsal from base to one-third. There is, however, some variation in the length of the white lines in the basal area, a broad pale yellow transverse fascia beyond the middle, narrowed towards dorsum and with an apical protrusion, bordered at the inner edge by two pale, greyish, golden, metallic, tubercular subcostal and subdorsal spots. The subcostal spot outwardly edged by a patch of blackish brown scales. The subdorsal spot further from base and inwardly edged dark brown. The inner subdorsal spot is sometimes beyond the edge of the transverse fascia and completely surrounded by yellow scales, bordered at the outer edge by two similarly coloured costal and dorsal spots. Both spots are opposite and edged ochreous-brown inwardly with the dorsal spot slightly larger than the costal. The outer costal spot is edged by a narrow white costal streak, a shining white apical line from the apical protrusion to apex, the cilia greyish ochreous around apex and paler towards dorsum.

Hindwing shining: Pale grey, cilia pale greyish ochreous.

Underside: forewing shining pale ochreous-grey. The white apical line is indistinctly visible and the hindwing shining pale grey. Abdomen is dorsally shining yellow mixed brown, with segments banded pale ochreous posteriorly, segment seven whitish, laterally pale ochreous, ventrally shining pale grey. Segments are banded shining white posteriorly, with the anal tuft white.
