= Carathis palpalis =

Scientific classification
- Kingdom: Animalia
- Phylum: Arthropoda
- Class: Insecta
- Order: Lepidoptera
- Superfamily: Noctuoidea
- Family: Erebidae
- Subfamily: Arctiinae
- Genus: Carathis
- Species: C. palpalis

Binomial name
- Carathis palpalis (Walker, 1855)

Synonyms
- Halesidota palpalis Walker, 1855

Species of moth

Carathis palpalis is a moth of the family Erebidae first described by Francis Walker in 1855. It is found on Jamaica.
