= Berocynta =

Scientific classification
- Domain: Eukaryota
- Kingdom: Animalia
- Phylum: Arthropoda
- Class: Insecta
- Order: Lepidoptera
- Superfamily: Noctuoidea
- Family: Erebidae
- Subfamily: Hypeninae
- Genus: Berocynta; Möschler, 1886
- Species: B. simplex

Binomial name
- Berocynta simplex Möschler, 1886

Genus and species of moth

Berocynta is a monotypic moth genus of the family Erebidae. Its only species, Berocynta simplex, is found in Jamaica. Both the genus and the species were first described by Heinrich Benno Möschler in 1886.
