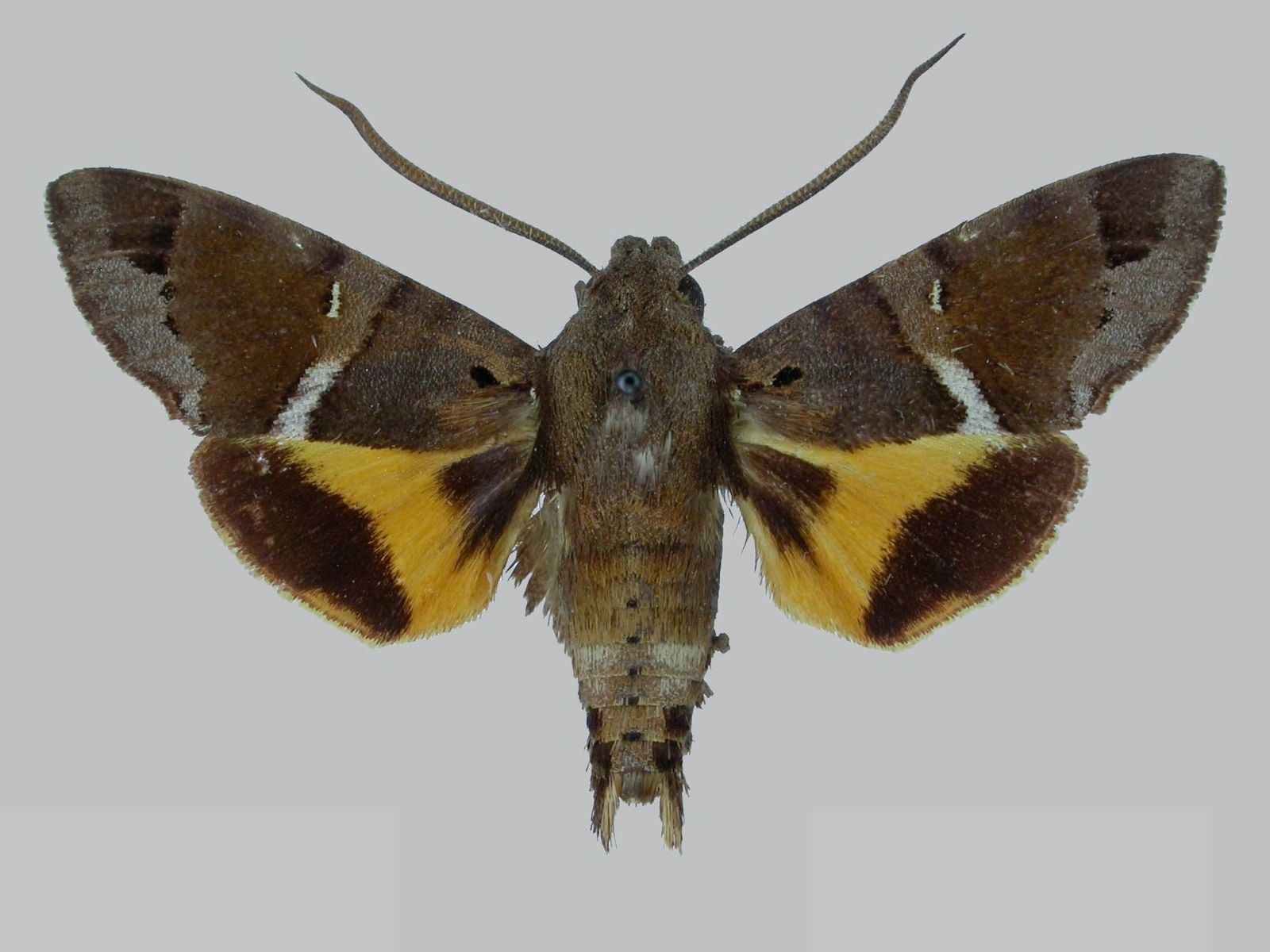

Scientific classification
- Domain: Eukaryota
- Kingdom: Animalia
- Phylum: Arthropoda
- Class: Insecta
- Order: Lepidoptera
- Family: Sphingidae
- Tribe: Dilophonotini
- Genus: Himantoides; Butler, 1876
- Species: H. undata

Binomial name
- Himantoides undata (Walker, 1856)

Synonyms
- Perigonia undata Walker, 1856; Himantoides perkinsae Clark, 1933

= Himantoides =

Genus of moths

Himantoides is a monotypic moth genus in the family Sphingidae erected by Arthur Gardiner Butler in 1876. Its only species, Himantoides undata, which was described by Francis Walker in 1856, is known from Jamaica.
