= Ethmia cubensis =

Scientific classification
- Domain: Eukaryota
- Kingdom: Animalia
- Phylum: Arthropoda
- Class: Insecta
- Order: Lepidoptera
- Family: Depressariidae
- Genus: Ethmia
- Species: E. cubensis

Binomial name
- Ethmia cubensis Busck, 1934

Species of moth

Ethmia cubensis is a moth in the family Depressariidae. It is found in Cuba and Jamaica.

The length of the forewings is 9.8–11 mm (0.39–0.43 in). The ground color of the forewings is pale greyish, heavily mottled with darker, especially the longitudinal streaks. The ground colour of the hindwings is white, but the distal margin and apical area are narrowly brown. Adults are on wing in April, May, July and December in Jamaica. There are probably multiple generations per year.
