= Nonia exiguella =

Scientific classification
- Kingdom: Animalia
- Phylum: Arthropoda
- Clade: Pancrustacea
- Class: Insecta
- Order: Lepidoptera
- Family: Pyralidae
- Genus: Nonia
- Species: N. exiguella

Binomial name
- Nonia exiguella (Ragonot, 1888)

Synonyms
- Homoeosoma exiguella Ragonot, 1888; Hypermescinia lambella Dyar, 1914

Species of moth

Nonia exiguella is a species of snout moth, and the type species in the genus Nonia. It was described by Ragonot in 1888, with its type locality being in Colombia.

== Range ==
Nonia exiguella is found in the Caribbean, Central America, and South America, with occurrences documented in Puerto Rico, the U.S. Virgin Islands, Jamaica, Guatemala, Panama, Colombia, and Paraguay.
