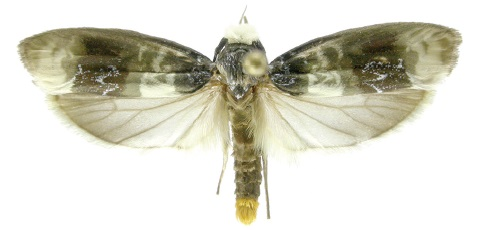

Scientific classification
- Domain: Eukaryota
- Kingdom: Animalia
- Phylum: Arthropoda
- Class: Insecta
- Order: Lepidoptera
- Family: Depressariidae
- Genus: Ethmia
- Species: E. scythropa

Binomial name
- Ethmia scythropa Walsingham, 1912

= Ethmia scythropa =

Species of moth

Ethmia scythropa is a moth in the family Depressariidae. It is widespread in the Neotropics, from eastern Mexico, Honduras and Guatemala to Costa Rica, as well as on Cuba and Jamaica.

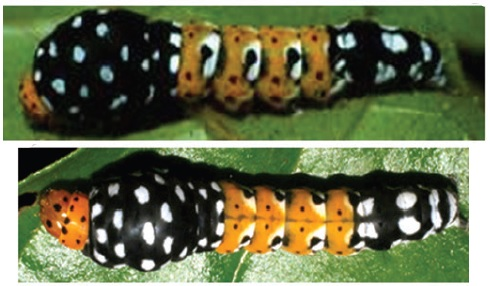
Larva

The length of the forewings is 9.4–12.5 mm (0.37–0.49 in). The ground color of the forewings is olivaceous gray, reflecting metallic olivaceous. The ground color of the hindwings is shining whitish, becoming pale brownish apically. Adults are on wing from December to March (in Cuba and Jamaica), from December to June and in September (in Mexico) and from March to May and from September to October (in Guatemala). There are multiple generations per year.

The larvae feed on Bourreria oxyphylla and Bourreria costaricensis.
