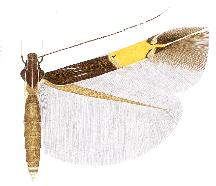

Scientific classification
- Kingdom: Animalia
- Phylum: Arthropoda
- Class: Insecta
- Order: Lepidoptera
- Family: Cosmopterigidae
- Genus: Cosmopterix
- Species: C. teligera

Binomial name
- Cosmopterix teligera Meyrick, 1915

Synonyms
- Cosmopterix abdita Hodges, 1962

= Cosmopterix teligera =

Species of moth

Cosmopterix teligera is a moth of the family Cosmopterigidae. It is known from the United States (Florida, south to Key Largo, and from Louisiana to north-western Arkansas), Brazil (Federal District), Colombia, Costa Rica, Cuba, Jamaica and Mexico (Tamaulipas).

Adults have been recorded from March to October in the United States. In Jamaica, adults have been found in January and February. There are probably overlapping generations in the tropics.

== Description ==
Male, female. Forewing length 3.3-4.8 mm. Head: frons shining ochreous-white with greenish and reddish reflections, vertex shining dark bronze brown with reddish gloss, neck tufts dark brown with reddish gloss, laterally and medially lined white, collar shining dark brown with reddish gloss; labial palpus first segment very short, white, second segment four-fifths of the length of third, greyish brown with white longitudinal lines laterally and ventrally, third segment white, lined brown laterally; scape dorsally dark brown with a white anterior line, ventrally white, antenna shining dark brown, with a short white line at base changing into an interrupted line to beyond one-half, followed towards apex by six dark brown, two or three white, two dark brown, two white, ten dark brown and eight white segments at apex. Thorax and tegulae shining dark brown with reddish gloss, thorax with a white median line, tegulae lined white inwardly. Legs: shining dark brown with reddish gloss, femora of midleg and hindleg shining ochreous-grey, foreleg with a white line on tibia and tarsal segments one to three and five, tibia of midleg with white oblique basal and medial lines (medial lines sometimes absent) and a white apical ring, tarsal segment one with a whitish lateral line on the outside and bending dorsally at apex, segment two with a white apical spot and segment five dorsally white, sometimes segments three and/or four with a white apical spot, tibia of hindleg with a very oblique silvery white line at base, a less oblique silvery white medial streak, a subapical ochreous ring and a white apical ring, tarsal segment one and two dorsally white in the apical half, segments four and five dorsally white, spurs ochreous-white dorsally, dark brown ventrally. Forewing shining dark brown with reddish gloss, four narrow white lines the basal area, a subcostal from base to one-quarter, bending from costa in distal half, a short medial above fold in the centre under the apex of the subcostal, a subdorsal about twice as long as the medial, but slightly further from base, a short and very narrow dorsal from beyond base to one-quarter, the white lines in the basal area can differ in length, especially the subcostal which starts from base in the North American specimens and beyond base in the Neotropical ones, an orange-yellow fascia beyond the middle, narrowing towards dorsum and with a narrow apical protrusion, bordered at the inner edge by a tubercular silver to pale golden metallic fascia with greenish reflection with a small subcostal patch of blackish brown scales on the outside, bordered at the outer edge by two tubercular silver or pale golden metallic costal and dorsal spots, the dorsal spot more than three times as large as the costal and more towards base, both spots irregularly lined dark brown on the inside, the transverse fascia, tubercular fascia and spots are variable in width, a narrow white costal streak from the costal spot, a white apical line from or just beyond the apical protrusion, sometimes interrupted in the middle, cilia dark brown, paler towards dorsum. Hindwing shining brownish grey with greenish and reddish gloss, cilia brown. Underside: forewing shining greyish brown, the white apical line often visible at apex, hindwing shining brownish grey. Abdomen dorsally brown, segments six and seven posteriorly banded grey, mixed whitish, ventrally shining yellowish white, anal tuft yellowish white, ochreous-grey in female.
