= Ethmia gelidella =

Scientific classification
- Kingdom: Animalia
- Phylum: Arthropoda
- Class: Insecta
- Order: Lepidoptera
- Family: Depressariidae
- Genus: Ethmia
- Species: E. gelidella

Binomial name
- Ethmia gelidella (Walker, 1864)

Synonyms
- Tamarrha gelidella Walker, 1864; Psecadia gelidella

Species of moth

Ethmia gelidella is a moth in the family Depressariidae. It is found in Jamaica.

The length of the forewings is 8.3–9.7 mm (0.33–0.38 in). The ground color of the forewings is white. The ground color of the hindwings is dark basally on the costal half, blue-gray in the cell and gray-brown at the costa above it. Adults are on wing in March, May and July.
