= Amplicincia walkeri =

Scientific classification
- Domain: Eukaryota
- Kingdom: Animalia
- Phylum: Arthropoda
- Class: Insecta
- Order: Lepidoptera
- Superfamily: Noctuoidea
- Family: Erebidae
- Subfamily: Arctiinae
- Genus: Amplicincia
- Species: A. walkeri

Binomial name
- Amplicincia walkeri Field, 1950

Species of moth

Amplicincia walkeri is a moth of the subfamily Arctiinae. It was described by William D. Field in 1950. It is found in Jamaica.
