= Diplodira =

Scientific classification
- Domain: Eukaryota
- Kingdom: Animalia
- Phylum: Arthropoda
- Class: Insecta
- Order: Lepidoptera
- Superfamily: Noctuoidea
- Family: Erebidae
- Subfamily: Herminiinae
- Genus: Diplodira; Schaus, 1916
- Species: D. jamaicalis

Binomial name
- Diplodira jamaicalis Schaus, 1916

Genus of moths

Diplodira is a monotypic moth genus in the family Erebidae. Its only species, Diplodira jamaicalis, is endemic to Jamaica. Both the genus and the species were first described by William Schaus in 1916.
