= Dialithis =

Scientific classification
- Kingdom: Animalia
- Phylum: Arthropoda
- Clade: Pancrustacea
- Class: Insecta
- Order: Lepidoptera
- Superfamily: Noctuoidea
- Family: Erebidae
- Subfamily: Calpinae
- Genus: Dialithis; Hübner, 1821
- Species: D. gemmifera

Binomial name
- Dialithis gemmifera Hübner, 1823

Genus of moths

Dialithis is a monotypic moth genus of the family Erebidae. Its only species, Dialithis gemmifera, is found in America. Both the genus and the species were first described by Jacob Hübner, the genus in 1821 and the species in 1823.
