= Scopula apparitaria =

Scientific classification
- Kingdom: Animalia
- Phylum: Arthropoda
- Class: Insecta
- Order: Lepidoptera
- Family: Geometridae
- Genus: Scopula
- Species: S. apparitaria

Binomial name
- Scopula apparitaria (Walker, 1861)

Synonyms
- Acidalia apparitaria Walker, 1861; Acidalia floccularia Herrich-Schaffer, 1870; Craspedia approbata Warren, 1900; Craspedia atomaria Warren, 1897; Acidalia responsaria Walker, 1861; Craspedia trias Warren, 1904

Species of geometer moth in subfamily Sterrhinae

Scopula apparitaria is a moth of the family Geometridae. It was described by Francis Walker in 1861. It is found in South and Central America, the Greater Antilles and Florida. The type location is Honduras.

The wingspan is about 17 millimetres (0.67 in).
