= Eois decursaria =

Scientific classification
- Kingdom: Animalia
- Phylum: Arthropoda
- Clade: Pancrustacea
- Class: Insecta
- Order: Lepidoptera
- Family: Geometridae
- Genus: Eois
- Species: E. decursaria

Binomial name
- Eois decursaria (Moschler, 1886)

Synonyms
- Asthena decursaria Moschler, 1886; Cambogia ferruginata Warren, 1897

Species of moth

Eois decursaria is a moth in the family Geometridae. It is found on Jamaica.
