= Amplicincia lathyi =

Scientific classification
- Domain: Eukaryota
- Kingdom: Animalia
- Phylum: Arthropoda
- Class: Insecta
- Order: Lepidoptera
- Superfamily: Noctuoidea
- Family: Erebidae
- Subfamily: Arctiinae
- Genus: Amplicincia
- Species: A. lathyi

Binomial name
- Amplicincia lathyi Field, 1950

Species of moth

Amplicincia lathyi is a moth of the subfamily Arctiinae. It was described by William D. Field in 1950. It is found in Jamaica.

The species can be distinguished from other Amplicincia species by the three transverse yellow bands on the upperside of the forewing.
