= Eupithecia succernata =

Scientific classification
- Domain: Eukaryota
- Kingdom: Animalia
- Phylum: Arthropoda
- Class: Insecta
- Order: Lepidoptera
- Family: Geometridae
- Genus: Eupithecia
- Species: E. succernata

Binomial name
- Eupithecia succernata Möschler, 1886

Species of moth

Eupithecia succernata is a moth in the family Geometridae, described by Heinrich Benno Möschler in 1886. It is found in Jamaica.
