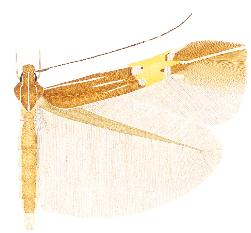

Scientific classification
- Kingdom: Animalia
- Phylum: Arthropoda
- Clade: Pancrustacea
- Class: Insecta
- Order: Lepidoptera
- Family: Cosmopterigidae
- Genus: Cosmopterix
- Species: C. ebriola

Binomial name
- Cosmopterix ebriola Hodges, 1962

= Cosmopterix ebriola =

Species of moth

Cosmopterix ebriola is a moth of the family Cosmopterigidae. It is known from the United States (from northern Florida and southern Mississippi to central Florida and South Carolina) and the Cayman Islands (Grand Cayman).

Adults have been collected from March to May and in July.

== Description ==
Male, female. Forewing length 4.5-4.9 mm. Head: frons shining pale ochreous with greenish and reddish reflections, vertex and neck tufts shining ochreous-brown with reddish reflection, medially and laterally lined white, collar ochreous-brown; labial palpus first segment very short, white, second segment three-quarters of the length of third, greyish brown with white longitudinal lines laterally and ventrally, third segment white, lined dark brown laterally; scape dark brown with a white anterior line, white ventrally; antenna shining dark brown, a white line from base to beyond one-half, followed towards apex by respectively a more or less vaguely annulated part of approx. ten segments, three whitish, three dark brown, two whitish and approximately 20 dark brown segments at apex. Thorax and tegulae ochreous-brown, thorax with a white median line, tegulae lined white inwardly. Legs: brownish grey, foreleg with a white line on tibia and tarsal segments, femora of midleg and hindleg shining ochreous-white, tibiae of midleg and hindleg with oblique basal and medial white lines and white apical rings, tarsal segment one of midleg dorsally white, tarsal segments one to three and five of hindleg dorsally white, segment four apically white, spurs white, ventrally ochreous-grey. Forewing ochreous-brown, five white lines in the basal area, a costal from one-quarter to the transverse fascia, a subcostal from base to one-third, very gradually bending from costa in distal half, a straight medial above fold, from one-quarter to just before the transverse fascia, a subdorsal below fold, as long as the medial, but slightly further from base, a narrow dorsal from beyond base to one-third, a broad pale yellow transverse fascia from beyond the middle, slightly narrowed towards dorsum with short apical protrusion, bordered at the inner edge by a tubercular silver metallic subcostal spot, outwardly with a patch of blackish brown scales and a similarly coloured subdorsal spot, the subdorsal spot about half the size of the subcostal and slightly further from base, both spots inwardly lined dark brown, by the specimen from Cayman Islands the inner subcostal and subdorsal spots are united and form a fascia at the inner edge, bordered at the outer edge by two tubercular silver metallic costal and dorsal spots, the dorsal spot a little larger than the costal and slightly more towards base, both spots edged brown inwardly, a broad white costal streak from the outer costal spot and a similar white streak from the outer dorsal spot, a broad shining white apical line from the apical protrusion, cilia ochreous-brown, ochreous-grey towards dorsum. Hindwing shining brownish grey, cilia ochreous-grey. Underside: forewing shining greyish brown, the white apex line indistinctly visible, hindwing shining brownish grey. Abdomen ochreous with golden gloss, laterally shining pale grey with purplish reflection, ventrally shining yellowish white, anal tuft yellowish white.
