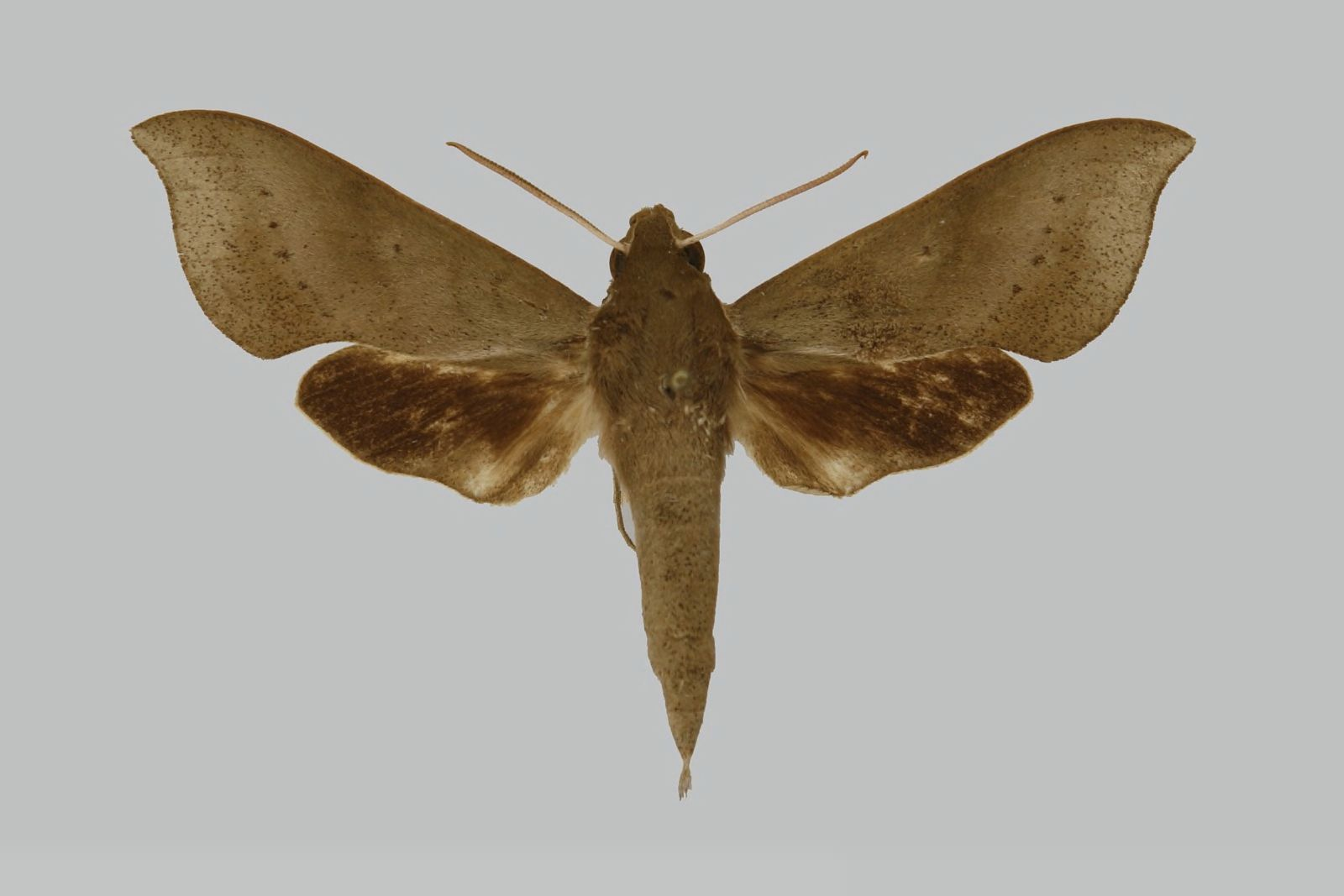

Scientific classification
- Domain: Eukaryota
- Kingdom: Animalia
- Phylum: Arthropoda
- Class: Insecta
- Order: Lepidoptera
- Family: Sphingidae
- Genus: Xylophanes
- Species: X. jamaicensis

Binomial name
- Xylophanes jamaicensis Clark, 1935

= Xylophanes jamaicensis =

Species of moth

Xylophanes jamaicensis is a moth of the family Sphingidae. It is known from Jamaica.
