= Paracincia dognini =

Scientific classification
- Kingdom: Animalia
- Phylum: Arthropoda
- Class: Insecta
- Order: Lepidoptera
- Superfamily: Noctuoidea
- Family: Erebidae
- Subfamily: Arctiinae
- Genus: Paracincia
- Species: P. dognini

Binomial name
- Paracincia dognini Field, 1950

Species of moth

Paracincia dognini is a moth of the subfamily Arctiinae. It was described by William D. Field in 1950. It is found on Jamaica.
