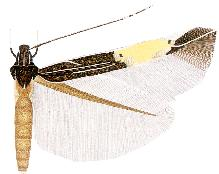

Scientific classification
- Kingdom: Animalia
- Phylum: Arthropoda
- Clade: Pancrustacea
- Class: Insecta
- Order: Lepidoptera
- Family: Cosmopterigidae
- Genus: Cosmopterix
- Species: C. argentifera

Binomial name
- Cosmopterix argentifera Koster, 2010

= Cosmopterix argentifera =

Species of moth from Jamaica

Cosmopterix argentifera is a moth of the family Cosmopterigidae. It is known from Jamaica.

Adults were collected in January.

== Description ==
Male. Forewing length 4.4 mm. Head: frons shining ochreous-grey, vertex and neck tufts shining dark brown with a median and two lateral white lines, collar shining dark brown; labial palpus first segment very short, white, second segment three-quarters of the length of third, dark brown with white longitudinal lines laterally and ventrally, third segment white, lined dark brown laterally; scape dorsally dark brown with a white anterior line, ventrally white, antenna shining dark brown, a white line from base to one-half, followed by a short annulate section of approximately five segments, followed towards apex by respectively four white, two dark brown, two white, six dark brown, two white, six dark brown and six white segments at apex. Thorax and tegulae shining dark brown, thorax medially with a short white posterior line. Legs: shining dark brown, foreleg with a white line on tibia and tarsal segments, tibiae of midleg and hindleg with white oblique basal and medial lines and white apical rings, tarsal segments one and two with a very oblique white line, tarsal segment four with white apical ring, tarsal segment five entirely white, femur of hindleg ochreous-brown, tarsal segment one with a white basal ring, extending on outside as a white line, apical half dorsally white, segments two and four with apical half dorsally white, segment five entirely white. Forewing shining dark brown with reddish gloss, five narrow white lines in the basal area, a first costal from base to one third, beyond one-half sharply bending from costa at an angle of 45°, a second costal from the bending point of the first, but not touching it, to the transverse fascia, a medial from near base to just before the transverse fascia, a subdorsal from one-fifth to slightly beyond the medial, a dorsal from base to about the middle of subdorsal, a pale yellow transverse fascia from the middle, narrowing towards dorsum on both sides, bordered at the inner edge by a tubercular very pale golden metallic subcostal and a dorsal spot, the subcostal spot nearer to base, slightly smaller than the dorsal and with a patch of blackish scales on outside, bordered at the outer edge by a similarly coloured costal and dorsal spot, the costal spot small with a patch of blackish scales on inside and outwardly edged by a white costal streak, the dorsal spot more than twice as large as the costal and ending where the costal spot starts, a narrow white apical line from transverse fascia to apex, cilia dark brown, from outer dorsal spot towards dorsum much paler. Hindwing shining brownish grey, cilia pale brown. Underside: forewing shining greyish brown, the white costal streak and apical line visible, hindwing shining greyish brown. Abdomen dorsally bronze brown, ventrally ochreous, segments banded shining white posteriorly, medially entirely white, anal tuft yellowish white.

== Etymology ==
The name argentifera is a manuscript name proposed by Walsingham. An adjective, meaning silver-bearing.
