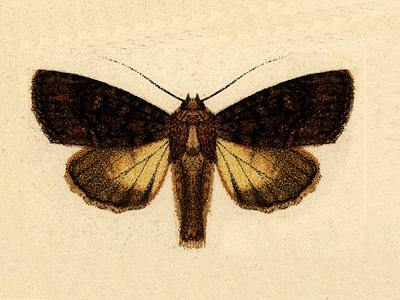

Scientific classification
- Kingdom: Animalia
- Phylum: Arthropoda
- Clade: Pancrustacea
- Class: Insecta
- Order: Lepidoptera
- Superfamily: Noctuoidea
- Family: Noctuidae
- Genus: Heterochroma
- Species: H. insignis

Binomial name
- Heterochroma insignis (Walker, 1857)

Synonyms
- Hadena insignis Walker, 1857

= Heterochroma insignis =

Species of moth

Heterochroma insignis is a moth of the family Noctuidae. It is found on Jamaica.
