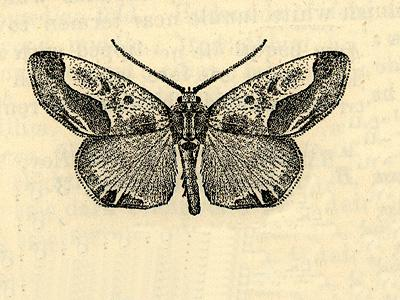
- This illustration, made by George Hampson in 1910, was misidentified as Caularis undulans

Scientific classification
- Domain: Eukaryota
- Kingdom: Animalia
- Phylum: Arthropoda
- Class: Insecta
- Order: Lepidoptera
- Superfamily: Noctuoidea
- Family: Noctuidae
- Genus: Caularis
- Species: C. jamaicensis

Binomial name
- Caularis jamaicensis Todd, 1966

= Caularis jamaicensis =

Species of moth

Caularis jamaicensis is a moth of the family Noctuidae first described by Todd in 1966. It is found on Jamaica.
