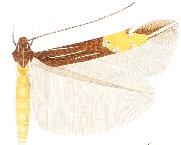

Scientific classification
- Kingdom: Animalia
- Phylum: Arthropoda
- Class: Insecta
- Order: Lepidoptera
- Family: Cosmopterigidae
- Genus: Cosmopterix
- Species: C. albicaudis

Binomial name
- Cosmopterix albicaudis (Meyrick, 1932)

= Cosmopterix albicaudis =

Species of moth from the Caribbean

Cosmopterix albicaudis is a moth of the family Cosmopterigidae. It is known from Jamaica, Trinidad and Tobago and the US Virgin Islands (St Thomas).

Adults were collected between the second half of January and the second half of April.

== Description ==
Male, female. Forewing length 3.2-3.5 mm. Head: frons shining greyish white with greenish and reddish reflections, vertex and neck tufts shining greyish brown with reddish gloss, laterally and medially lined white, the white median line can be present, partly present or even completely absent; collar shining greyish brown; labial palpus first segment very short, white, second segment three-quarters of the length of third, dark brown with white longitudinal lines laterally and ventrally, third segment white, lined brown laterally, extreme apex white; scape dorsally shining dark brown with a white anterior line, ventrally shining white, antenna shining dark brown with a white line from base to almost one-half, becoming interrupted towards apex, this annulated section somewhat variable in length, followed towards apex by five white segments, one dark brown, one white, one dark brown, one white, ten dark brown and eight white segments at apex. Thorax and tegulae shining greyish brown with reddish gloss, thorax with a white median line. Legs: shining dark greyish brown, femora shining ochreous-white, foreleg with a white line on tibia and tarsal segments, femora of midleg and hindleg shining ochreous-white, tibia of midleg with white oblique basal and medial lines and white apical ring, tarsal segment one, two and three with white apical rings, tarsal segments four and five white, tibia of hindleg with a very oblique white line from base to beyond one-half and with white apical ring, tarsal segments with white apical rings, tarsal segments four and five entirely white, spurs white dorsally, brown ventrally. Forewing shining greyish brown, four narrow white lines in the basal area, a subcostal from base to one-quarter, gradually bending from costa, a medial from one-sixth to one-third and just above fold, a sometimes oblique, subdorsal from one-quarter almost reaching the transverse fascia, a short and thick line on dorsum at base, followed by a short and narrower dorsal line to one-quarter, a bright yellow transverse fascia from the middle with a broad prolongation towards apex, followed by a narrow apical protrusion in the specimens from Jamaica, bordered at the inner edge by two subcostal and dorsal tubercular pale golden metallic spots, the dorsal further from base, the subcostal spot with an outward patch of blackish scales, beyond the middle of transverse fascia a small tubercular pale golden metallic costal spot, outwardly edged by a white costal streak, a similar but larger dorsal spot opposite the costal, a shining white apical line from The transverse fascia towards apex, cilia greyish brown at apex, ochreous-grey towards dorsum. Hindwing shining pale grey, cilia ochreous grey. Underside: forewing shining brownish grey, the transverse fascia and the white apical line indistinctly visible, hindwing shining grey. Abdomen dorsally yellowish with golden and reddish gloss, ventrally from entirely shining creamy white to shining dark grey with segments banded shining white posteriorly and with a broad shining yellowish white longitudinal streak, anal tuft dorsally ochreous, ventrally creamy white.
