= Ethmia farrella =

Scientific classification
- Kingdom: Animalia
- Phylum: Arthropoda
- Clade: Pancrustacea
- Class: Insecta
- Order: Lepidoptera
- Family: Depressariidae
- Genus: Ethmia
- Species: E. farrella

Binomial name
- Ethmia farrella Powell, 1973

Species of moth

Ethmia farrella is a moth in the family Depressariidae. It is found in Jamaica and the Florida Keys.

The length of the forewings is 6.5–6.7 mm (0.26–0.26 in). The ground color of the forewings is whitish, heavily and nearly uniformly streaked with longitudinal dark gray blotches. The ground color of the hindwings is semitranslucent white, tinged with brownish distally. Adults have been recorded from May to September in Florida.
