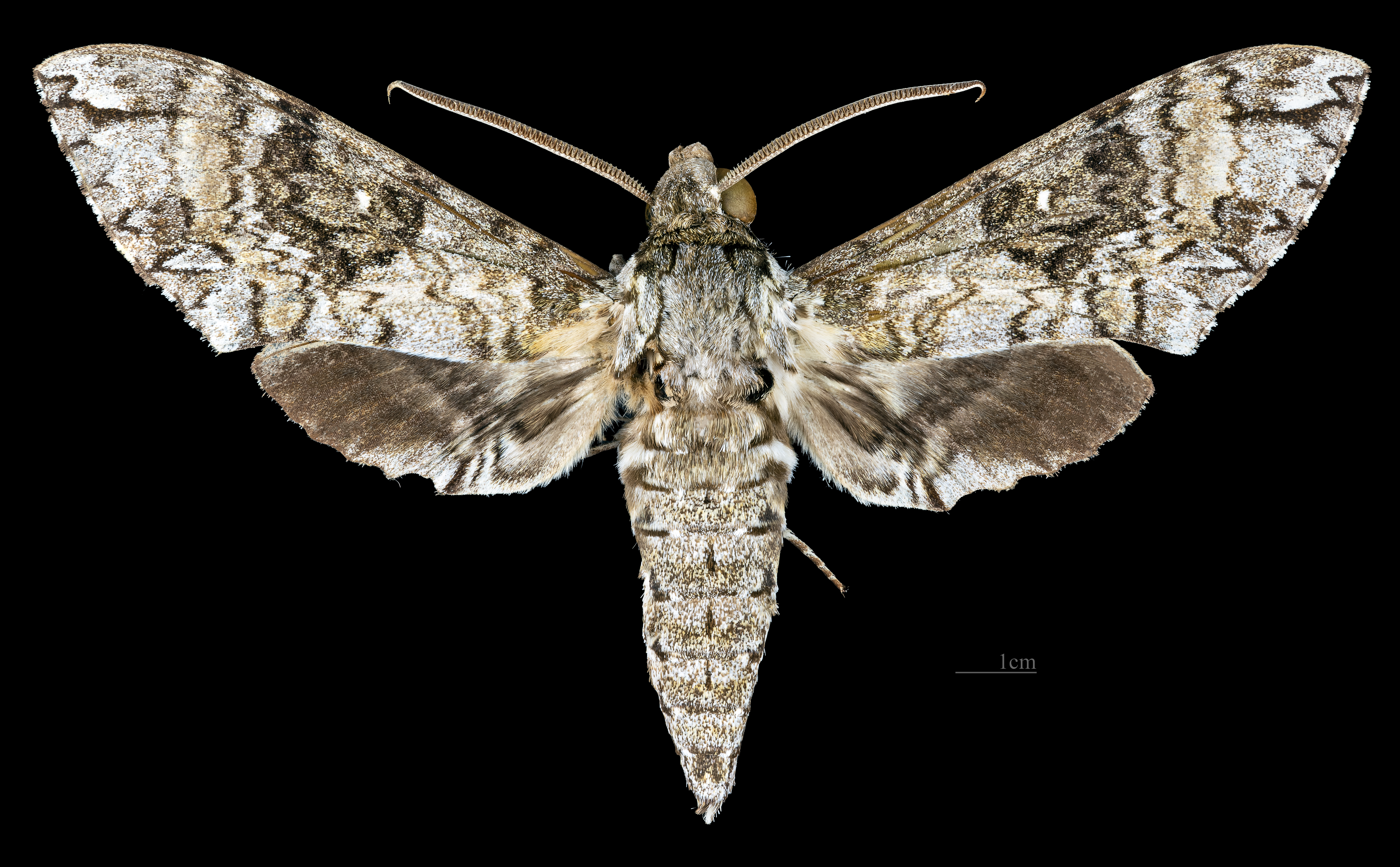
- Male, dorsal view
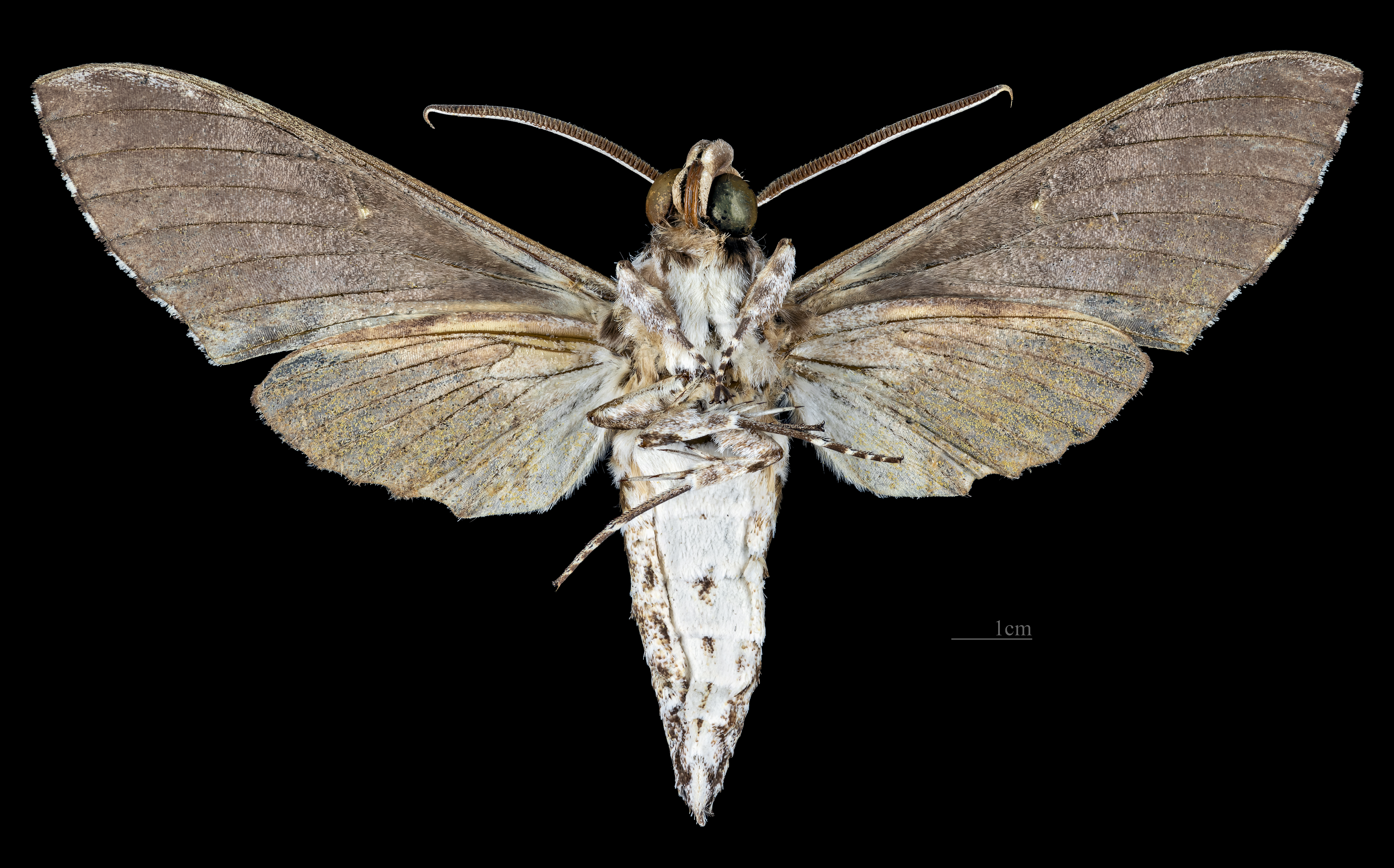
- Male, ventral view

Scientific classification
- Kingdom: Animalia
- Phylum: Arthropoda
- Clade: Pancrustacea
- Class: Insecta
- Order: Lepidoptera
- Family: Sphingidae
- Genus: Manduca
- Species: M. brontes

Binomial name
- Manduca brontes (Drury, 1773)

Synonyms
- Sphinx brontes Drury, 1773; Macrosila collaris Walker, 1856; Protoparce brontes smythi Clark, 1919; Sphinx brontes pamphilius Stoll, 1782; Sphinx brontes cubensis Grote, 1865; Protoparce brontes haitiensis Clark, 1916

= Manduca brontes =

Species of moth

Manduca brontes is a species of moth in the family Sphingidae first described by Dru Drury in 1773. It is known from Jamaica, Cuba, Haiti, Puerto Rico, the Cayman Islands, the Dominican Republic and Suriname.

Adults are on wing from April to June in Florida.

The larvae have been recorded feeding on Tecoma species (including Tecoma stans), Fraxinus americana, Fraxinus excelsior and Fraxinus platycarpa.

== Subspecies ==
- M. brontes brontes (Jamaica and Cuba, Greater Antilles and northern South America)
- M. brontes cubensis (Kitching and Cadiou, 2000) (Cuba, the Cayman Islands and Florida)
- M. brontes haitiensis (B.P. Clark, 1916) (Haiti and the Dominican Republic)
- M. brontes pamphilius (Cramer, 1782) (Puerto Rico)
