= Paracincia butleri =

Scientific classification
- Kingdom: Animalia
- Phylum: Arthropoda
- Clade: Pancrustacea
- Class: Insecta
- Order: Lepidoptera
- Superfamily: Noctuoidea
- Family: Erebidae
- Subfamily: Arctiinae
- Genus: Paracincia
- Species: P. butleri

Binomial name
- Paracincia butleri Field, 1950

Species of moth

Paracincia butleri is a moth of the subfamily Arctiinae. It was described by William D. Field in 1950. It is found on Jamaica.
