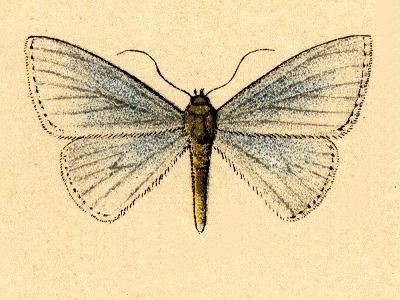

Scientific classification
- Kingdom: Animalia
- Phylum: Arthropoda
- Class: Insecta
- Order: Lepidoptera
- Family: Geometridae
- Genus: Zanclopteryx
- Species: Z. uniferata

Binomial name
- Zanclopteryx uniferata (Walker, 1863)

Synonyms
- Gasmara uniferata Walker, 1863

= Zanclopteryx uniferata =

Species of moth

Zanclopteryx uniferata is a moth of the family Geometridae first described by Francis Walker in 1863. It is found in South America and Central America, as well as on the Bahamas and Jamaica.
