= Ethmia subsimilis =

Scientific classification
- Domain: Eukaryota
- Kingdom: Animalia
- Phylum: Arthropoda
- Class: Insecta
- Order: Lepidoptera
- Family: Depressariidae
- Genus: Ethmia
- Species: E. subsimilis

Binomial name
- Ethmia subsimilis Walsingham, 1897

Species of moth

Ethmia subsimilis is a moth in the family Depressariidae. It is found in Jamaica and Cuba and has also been recorded from Florida in the United States.

The length of the forewings is 7.5–9.7 mm (0.30–0.38 in). The ground color of the forewings is pale whitish gray. The ground color of the hindwings is whitish, becoming pale brownish or dark brown toward the apex. Adults are on wing in January and February (in Cuba) and April, July and September (in Jamaica).

The larvae feed on the leaves of Trichilia hirta.
