= Amplicincia mixta =

Scientific classification
- Domain: Eukaryota
- Kingdom: Animalia
- Phylum: Arthropoda
- Class: Insecta
- Order: Lepidoptera
- Superfamily: Noctuoidea
- Family: Erebidae
- Subfamily: Arctiinae
- Genus: Amplicincia
- Species: A. mixta

Binomial name
- Amplicincia mixta Möschler, 1886

Synonyms
- Aemene mixta

Species of moth

Amplicincia mixta is a moth of the subfamily Arctiinae. It was described by Heinrich Benno Möschler in 1886. It is found in Jamaica.
