= Ethmia piperella =

Scientific classification
- Kingdom: Animalia
- Phylum: Arthropoda
- Clade: Pancrustacea
- Class: Insecta
- Order: Lepidoptera
- Family: Depressariidae
- Genus: Ethmia
- Species: E. piperella

Binomial name
- Ethmia piperella Powell, 1973

Species of moth

Ethmia piperella is a moth in the family Depressariidae. It is found in Jamaica and Cuba.

The length of the forewings is 5.4–6.8 mm (0.21–0.27 in). The ground color of the forewings is greyish tan, but the dorsal area somewhat paler and not well defined. The ground colour of the hindwings is uniform pale grey.
