= Amplicincia pallida =

Scientific classification
- Domain: Eukaryota
- Kingdom: Animalia
- Phylum: Arthropoda
- Class: Insecta
- Order: Lepidoptera
- Superfamily: Noctuoidea
- Family: Erebidae
- Subfamily: Arctiinae
- Genus: Amplicincia
- Species: A. pallida

Binomial name
- Amplicincia pallida (Butler, 1878)

Synonyms
- Cincia pallida Butler, 1878; Aemene pallida

Species of moth

Amplicincia pallida is a moth of the subfamily Arctiinae. It was described by Arthur Gardiner Butler in 1878. It is found in Jamaica.
