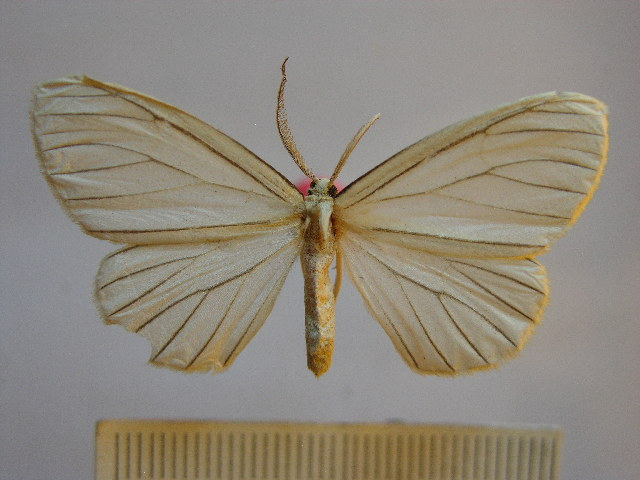

Scientific classification
- Domain: Eukaryota
- Kingdom: Animalia
- Phylum: Arthropoda
- Class: Insecta
- Order: Lepidoptera
- Superfamily: Noctuoidea
- Family: Erebidae
- Subfamily: Arctiinae
- Subtribe: Pericopina
- Genus: Xenosoma
- Species: X. flavisedes

Binomial name
- Xenosoma flavisedes Dognin, 1891

= Xenosoma flavisedes =

Species of moth

Xenosoma flavisedes is a moth in the subfamily Arctiinae first described by Paul Dognin in 1891. It is found in Venezuela.
