= Xenosoma bryki =

Scientific classification
- Domain: Eukaryota
- Kingdom: Animalia
- Phylum: Arthropoda
- Class: Insecta
- Order: Lepidoptera
- Superfamily: Noctuoidea
- Family: Erebidae
- Subfamily: Arctiinae
- Subtribe: Pericopina
- Genus: Xenosoma
- Species: X. bryki

Binomial name
- Xenosoma bryki Hering, 1943

Species of moth

Xenosoma bryki is a moth in the subfamily Arctiinae first described by Hering in 1943. It is found in Colombia.
