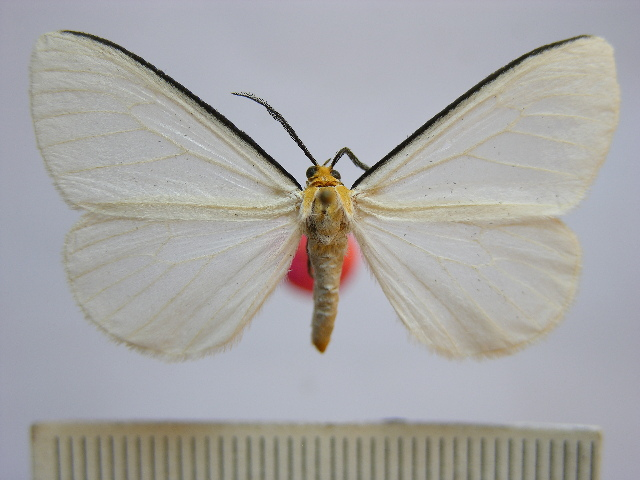

Scientific classification
- Kingdom: Animalia
- Phylum: Arthropoda
- Class: Insecta
- Order: Lepidoptera
- Superfamily: Noctuoidea
- Family: Erebidae
- Subfamily: Arctiinae
- Subtribe: Pericopina
- Genus: Xenosoma
- Species: X. flaviceps

Binomial name
- Xenosoma flaviceps (Walker, 1865)

Synonyms
- Eloria flaviceps Walker, 1865; Xenosoma nigricosta Felder, 1874

= Xenosoma flaviceps =

Species of moth

Xenosoma flaviceps is a moth in the subfamily Arctiinae first described by Francis Walker in 1865. It is found in northern Mexico (San Luis Potosí) and southern Mexico from at least Chiapas to Guatemala and Costa Rica. A single specimen was collected at Alamo, Texas in 2012.
