= Pteroodes =

Scientific classification
- Domain: Eukaryota
- Kingdom: Animalia
- Phylum: Arthropoda
- Class: Insecta
- Order: Lepidoptera
- Superfamily: Noctuoidea
- Family: Erebidae
- Subfamily: Arctiinae
- Subtribe: Pericopina
- Genus: Pteroodes; Butler, 1877

Genus of moths

Pteroodes is a genus of moths in the subfamily Arctiinae. The genus was erected by Arthur Gardiner Butler in 1877.

== Species ==
- Pteroodes longipennis (Walker, 1854) Mexico
- Pteroodes clitus (Druce, 1884) Costa Rica
