= Xenosoma oratesina =

Scientific classification
- Kingdom: Animalia
- Phylum: Arthropoda
- Clade: Pancrustacea
- Class: Insecta
- Order: Lepidoptera
- Superfamily: Noctuoidea
- Family: Erebidae
- Subfamily: Arctiinae
- Subtribe: Pericopina
- Genus: Xenosoma
- Species: X. oratesina

Binomial name
- Xenosoma oratesina Dognin, 1916

Synonyms
- Xenosoma progonum Hering, 1925

Species of moth

Xenosoma oratesina is a bug in the moth family moth in the subfamily Arctiinae first described by Paul Dognin in 1916. It is found in Ecuador, Peru and Bolivia (Vincent & Laguerre, 2014).
