= Xenosoma dubia =

Scientific classification
- Domain: Eukaryota
- Kingdom: Animalia
- Phylum: Arthropoda
- Class: Insecta
- Order: Lepidoptera
- Superfamily: Noctuoidea
- Family: Erebidae
- Subfamily: Arctiinae
- Subtribe: Pericopina
- Genus: Xenosoma
- Species: X. dubia

Binomial name
- Xenosoma dubia (Warren, 1900)

Synonyms
- Cyphopora dubia Warren, 1900

Species of moth

Xenosoma dubia is a moth in the subfamily Arctiinae first described by Warren in 1900. It is found in Ecuador.
