= Xenosoma nicander =

Scientific classification
- Domain: Eukaryota
- Kingdom: Animalia
- Phylum: Arthropoda
- Class: Insecta
- Order: Lepidoptera
- Superfamily: Noctuoidea
- Family: Erebidae
- Subfamily: Arctiinae
- Subtribe: Pericopina
- Genus: Xenosoma
- Species: X. nicander

Binomial name
- Xenosoma nicander H. Druce, 1886

Species of moth

Xenosoma nicander is a moth in the subfamily Arctiinae first described by Herbert Druce in 1886. It is found in Costa Rica and Panama.
