= Josiomorpha triangulifera =

Scientific classification
- Kingdom: Animalia
- Phylum: Arthropoda
- Clade: Pancrustacea
- Class: Insecta
- Order: Lepidoptera
- Superfamily: Noctuoidea
- Family: Erebidae
- Subfamily: Arctiinae
- Genus: Josiomorpha
- Species: J. triangulifera

Binomial name
- Josiomorpha triangulifera Hering, 1925

Species of moth

Josiomorpha triangulifera is a moth of the subfamily Arctiinae first described by Hering in 1925. It is found in Costa Rica and Panama.

== Taxonomy ==
The species was previously synonymized with Josiomorpha penetrata.
