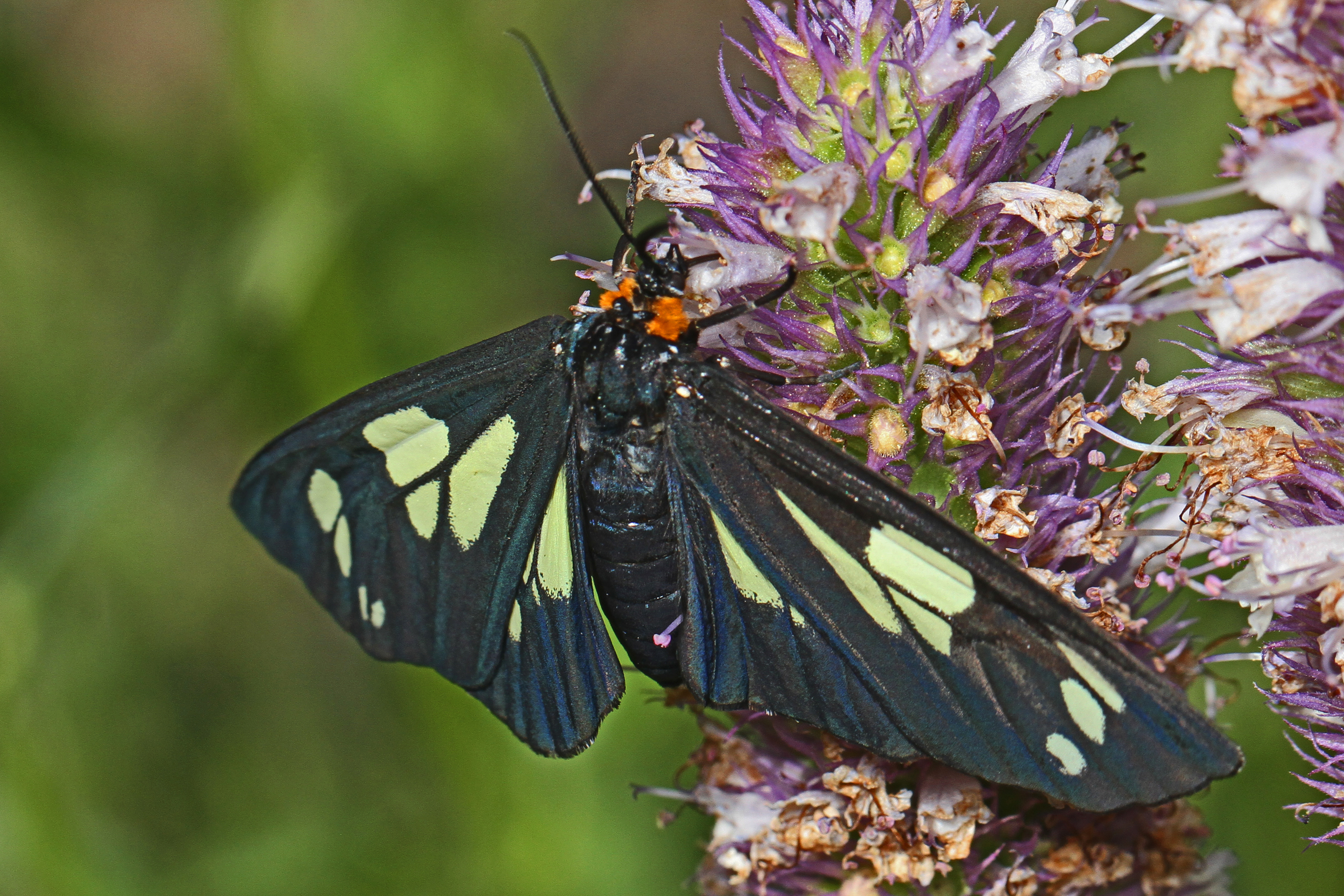

Scientific classification
- Kingdom: Animalia
- Phylum: Arthropoda
- Clade: Pancrustacea
- Class: Insecta
- Order: Lepidoptera
- Superfamily: Noctuoidea
- Family: Erebidae
- Subfamily: Arctiinae
- Genus: Gnophaela
- Species: G. latipennis

Binomial name
- Gnophaela latipennis (Boisduval, 1852)

Synonyms
- Glaucopsis latipennis Boisduval, 1852; Gnophaela hopfferi Grote & Robinson, 1868

= Gnophaela latipennis =

Wild forget-me-not moth

Species of moth

Gnophaela latipennis, the wild forget-me-not moth, is a day-flying moth native to the Pacific Northwest. It is in the family Erebidae. The species was first described by Jean Baptiste Boisduval in 1852.

== Distribution ==
It is found in western North America in Oregon, California, and the western edge of Nevada. The habitat consists of open mixed hardwood-conifer forests, oak woodlands and open riparian areas near creeks, as well as in open ponderosa pine forests and mountain meadows. Adults are on wing from late May to early August.

== Description ==
The length of the forewings is around 26 mm (1.0 in).

It has wedge-shaped wings with smooth, rounded margins. The wings are black with large translucent, white to greenish-yellow spots. The head and body are black with small white spots. The proximal forelegs are bright orange. The antennae of males are bipectinate.

== Larva ==
Miller describes the caterpillar as "Yellow with dorsal, lateral, and ventral black patches [or black with yellow patches]; clusters of white hairs originate from black bases with blue spots. Head red-brown."

G. latipennis overwinters as second instar larva. Host Plants are Cynoglossum grande, Cynoglossum occidentale, Hackelia californica, Mertensia and Myosotis species.

Gnophaela latipennis larva

== Similar Species ==
- Police Car Moth (Gnophaela vermiculata)
- Ridings' Forester (Alypia ridingsii)
- Gnophaela discreta
- Southern White Admiral (Limenitis reducta)

== External links and images ==
- Moth Photography Group
- Bug Guide
- iNaturalist
- Pacific Northwest Moths
