= Xenosoma nigromarginatum =

Scientific classification
- Domain: Eukaryota
- Kingdom: Animalia
- Phylum: Arthropoda
- Class: Insecta
- Order: Lepidoptera
- Superfamily: Noctuoidea
- Family: Erebidae
- Subfamily: Arctiinae
- Subtribe: Pericopina
- Genus: Xenosoma
- Species: X. nigromarginatum

Binomial name
- Xenosoma nigromarginatum H. Druce, 1886

Synonyms
- Xenosoma costaricanum Hering, 1943

Species of moth

Xenosoma nigromarginatum is a moth in the subfamily Arctiinae first described by Herbert Druce in 1886. It is found in Costa Rica.
