= Xenosoma geometrina =

Scientific classification
- Domain: Eukaryota
- Kingdom: Animalia
- Phylum: Arthropoda
- Class: Insecta
- Order: Lepidoptera
- Superfamily: Noctuoidea
- Family: Erebidae
- Subfamily: Arctiinae
- Subtribe: Pericopina
- Genus: Xenosoma
- Species: X. geometrina

Binomial name
- Xenosoma geometrina (Schaus, 1910)

Synonyms
- Eloria geometrina Schaus, 1910

Species of moth

Xenosoma geometrina is a moth in the Arctiidae family and subfamily Arctiinae first described by William Schaus in 1910. It is found in Costa Rica.
