= Pseudophaloe ninonia =

Scientific classification
- Domain: Eukaryota
- Kingdom: Animalia
- Phylum: Arthropoda
- Class: Insecta
- Order: Lepidoptera
- Superfamily: Noctuoidea
- Family: Erebidae
- Subfamily: Arctiinae
- Genus: Pseudophaloe
- Species: P. ninonia

Binomial name
- Pseudophaloe ninonia (H. Druce, 1884)

Synonyms
- Eucyane ninonia H. Druce, 1884; Pericopis cotta H. Druce, 1897; Pseudophaloe cotta; Phaloe levisi Schaus, 1910

Species of moth

Pseudophaloe ninonia is a moth of the family Erebidae first described by Herbert Druce in 1884. It is found in Panama and Costa Rica.
