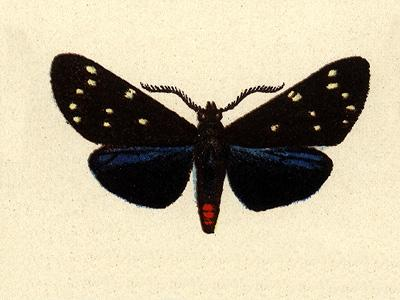

Scientific classification
- Domain: Eukaryota
- Kingdom: Animalia
- Phylum: Arthropoda
- Class: Insecta
- Order: Lepidoptera
- Superfamily: Noctuoidea
- Family: Erebidae
- Subfamily: Arctiinae
- Genus: Ctenuchidia
- Species: C. virgo

Binomial name
- Ctenuchidia virgo (Herrich-Schäffer, [1855])

Synonyms
- Ctenucha virgo Herrich-Schäffer, [1855]

= Ctenuchidia virgo =

Species of moth

Ctenuchidia virgo is a moth of the subfamily Arctiinae first described by Gottlieb August Wilhelm Herrich-Schäffer in 1855. It is found on Jamaica, Cuba and Puerto Rico.
