= Pteroodes longipennis =

Scientific classification
- Kingdom: Animalia
- Phylum: Arthropoda
- Class: Insecta
- Order: Lepidoptera
- Superfamily: Noctuoidea
- Family: Erebidae
- Subfamily: Arctiinae
- Genus: Pteroodes
- Species: P. longipennis

Binomial name
- Pteroodes longipennis (Walker, 1854)

Synonyms
- Lithosia longipennis Walker, 1854

Species of moth

Pteroodes longipennis is a moth in the subfamily Arctiinae first described by Francis Walker in 1854. It is found in Mexico.
