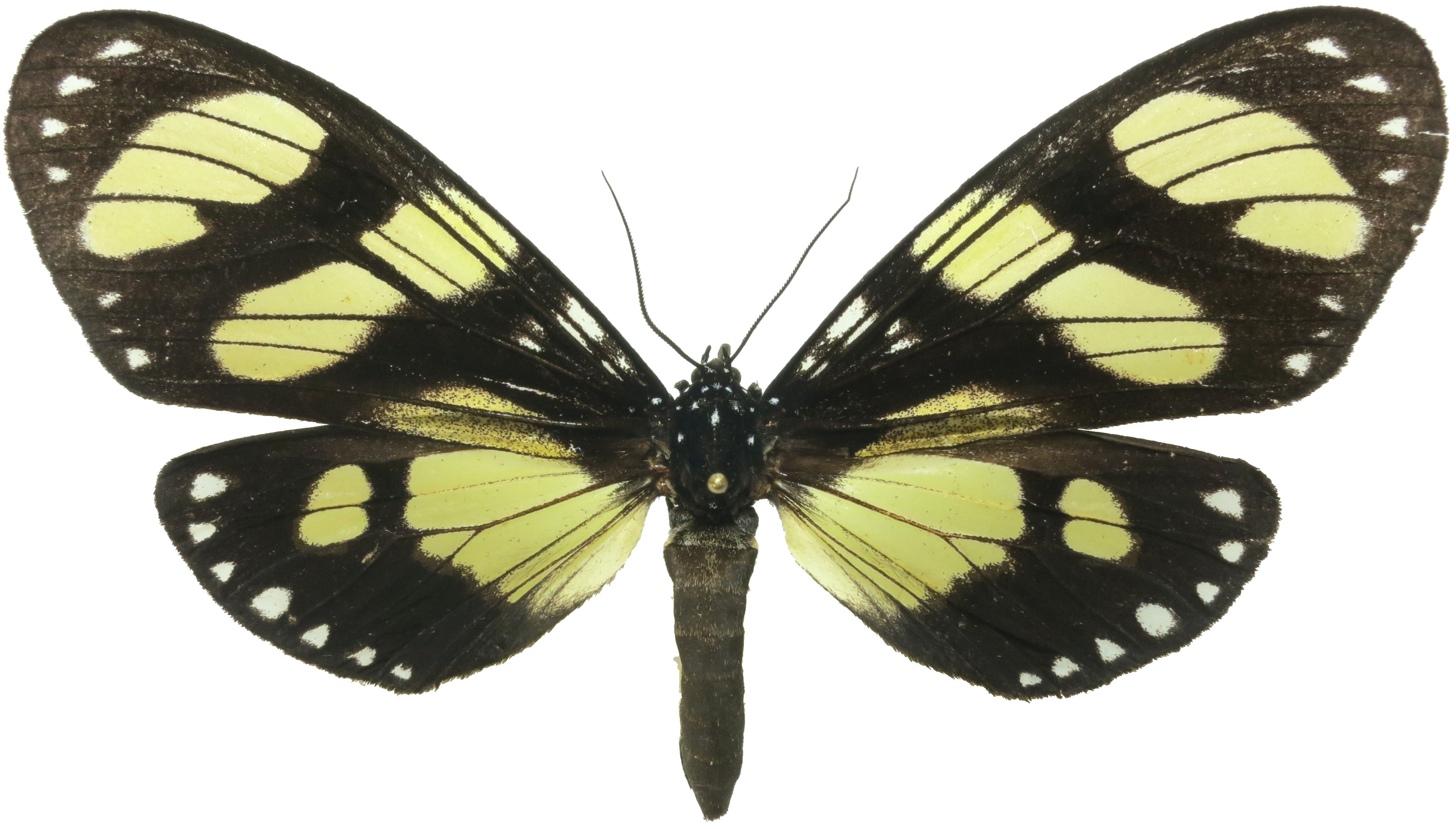
- N. heliconides from Iquitos, Peru

Scientific classification
- Kingdom: Animalia
- Phylum: Arthropoda
- Clade: Pancrustacea
- Class: Insecta
- Order: Lepidoptera
- Superfamily: Noctuoidea
- Family: Erebidae
- Subfamily: Arctiinae
- Genus: Notophyson
- Species: N. heliconides

Binomial name
- Notophyson heliconides (Swainson, 1833)

Synonyms
- Anthomyza heliconides Swainson, [1833]; Dysschema obsoleta Hering, 1925

= Notophyson heliconides =

Species of moth

Notophyson heliconides is a moth of the subfamily Arctiinae. It was described by Swainson in 1833. It is found in Brazil, Suriname, French Guiana and Peru.
