= Mesenochroa rogersi =

Scientific classification
- Kingdom: Animalia
- Phylum: Arthropoda
- Clade: Pancrustacea
- Class: Insecta
- Order: Lepidoptera
- Superfamily: Noctuoidea
- Family: Erebidae
- Subfamily: Arctiinae
- Genus: Mesenochroa
- Species: M. rogersi

Binomial name
- Mesenochroa rogersi H. Druce, 1885

Species of moth

Mesenochroa rogersi is a moth of the subfamily Arctiinae. It was described by Herbert Druce in 1885. It is found in Costa Rica.
