= Cyanarctia dama =

Scientific classification
- Domain: Eukaryota
- Kingdom: Animalia
- Phylum: Arthropoda
- Class: Insecta
- Order: Lepidoptera
- Superfamily: Noctuoidea
- Family: Erebidae
- Subfamily: Arctiinae
- Genus: Cyanarctia
- Species: C. dama

Binomial name
- Cyanarctia dama (H. Druce, 1894)

Synonyms
- Eupyra dama H. Druce, 1894

Species of moth

Cyanarctia dama is a moth of the subfamily Arctiinae. It was described by Herbert Druce in 1894. It is found in Mexico and Guatemala.
