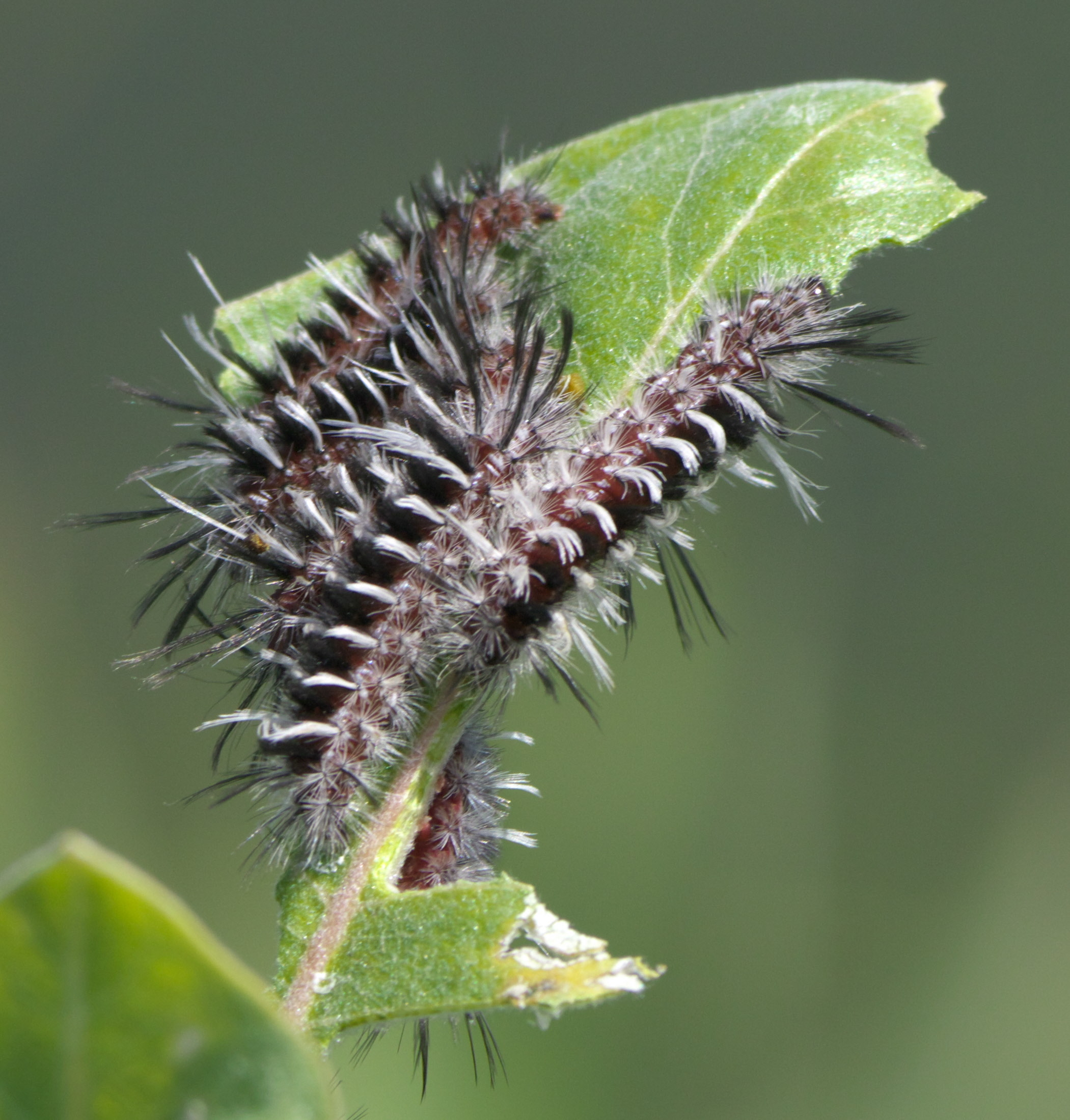

Scientific classification
- Kingdom: Animalia
- Phylum: Arthropoda
- Class: Insecta
- Order: Lepidoptera
- Superfamily: Noctuoidea
- Family: Erebidae
- Subfamily: Arctiinae
- Genus: Pygoctenucha
- Species: P. terminalis

Binomial name
- Pygoctenucha terminalis (Walker, 1854)

Synonyms
- Apistosia terminalis Walker, 1854; Ctenucha harrisii Boisduval, 1869; Ctenucha votiva H. Edwards, 1884

= Pygoctenucha terminalis =

Species of moth

Pygoctenucha terminalis, the blue-green lichen moth, is a moth in the family Erebidae. It was described by Francis Walker in 1854. It is found in Mexico and in the United States in eastern Colorado, New Mexico and southeastern Arizona.

The wingspan is about 43 mm. Adults are on wing from late-May to early-August

The larvae feed on Asclepias species, including Asclepias tuberosa.
