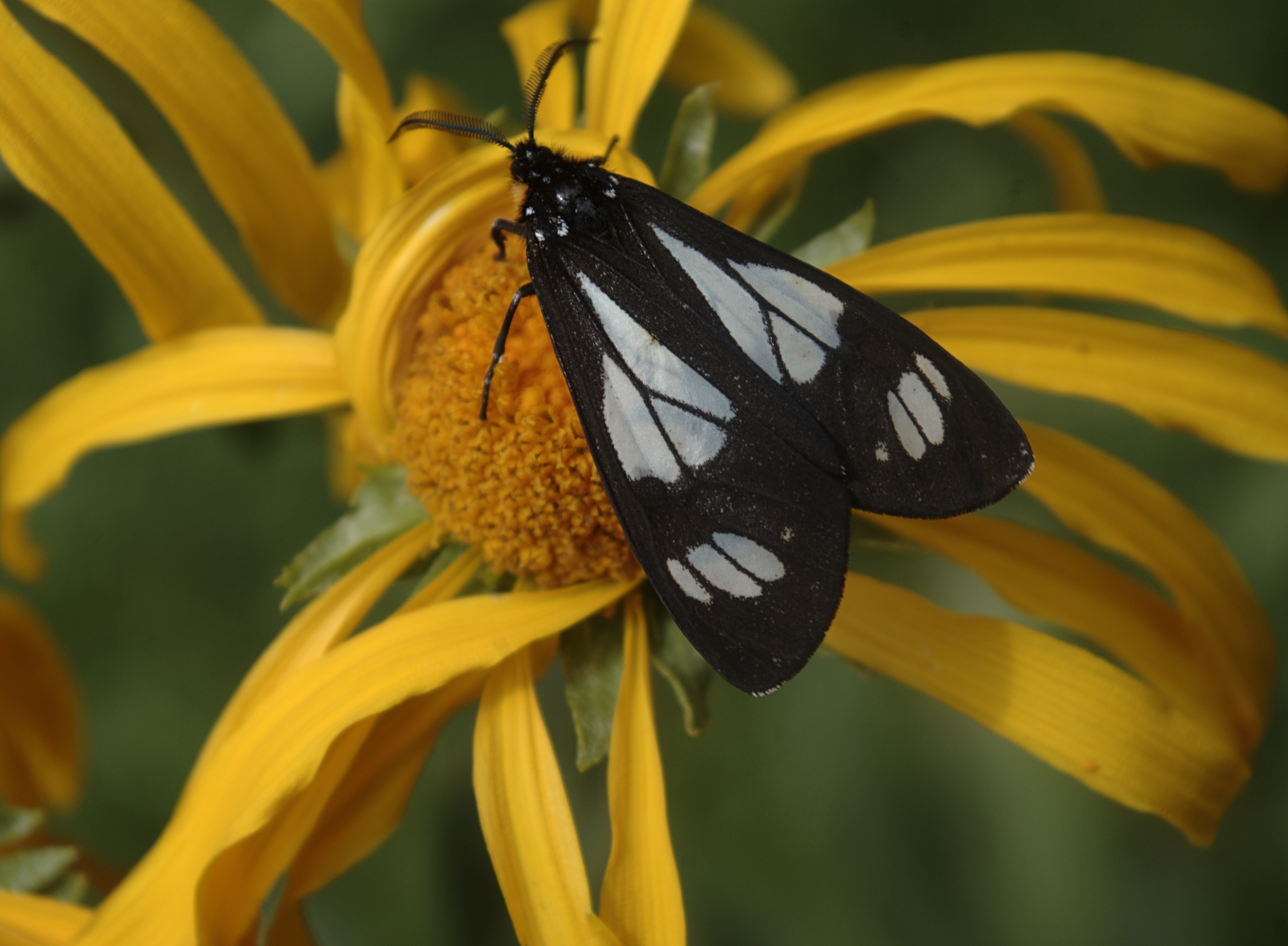
- Gnophaela vermiculata

Scientific classification
- Kingdom: Animalia
- Phylum: Arthropoda
- Class: Insecta
- Order: Lepidoptera
- Superfamily: Noctuoidea
- Family: Erebidae
- Subfamily: Arctiinae
- Subtribe: Pericopina
- Genus: Gnophaela; Walker, 1854

Synonyms
- Omoiala Grote, [1864]; Lamprosoma Grote, [1864]; Callalucia Grote, 1865

= Gnophaela =

Genus of moths

Gnophaela is a genus of tiger moths in the family Erebidae. The genus was erected by Francis Walker in 1854.

== Species ==
It consists of the following species:

- Gnophaela vermiculata (Grote, [1864])
- Gnophaela discreta Stretch, 1875
- Gnophaela aequinoctialis Walker, 1854
- Gnophaela latipennis (Boisduval, 1852)
- Gnophaela clappiana Holland, 1891
