= Euchlaenidia transcisa =

Scientific classification
- Kingdom: Animalia
- Phylum: Arthropoda
- Class: Insecta
- Order: Lepidoptera
- Superfamily: Noctuoidea
- Family: Erebidae
- Subfamily: Arctiinae
- Genus: Euchlaenidia
- Species: E. transcisa

Binomial name
- Euchlaenidia transcisa (Walker, 1854)

Synonyms
- Phaeochlaena transcisa Walker, 1854; Heliactinidia bimaculata Druce, 1906

Species of moth

Euchlaenidia transcisa is a moth of the family Erebidae. It was described by Francis Walker in 1854. It is found in Brazil.
