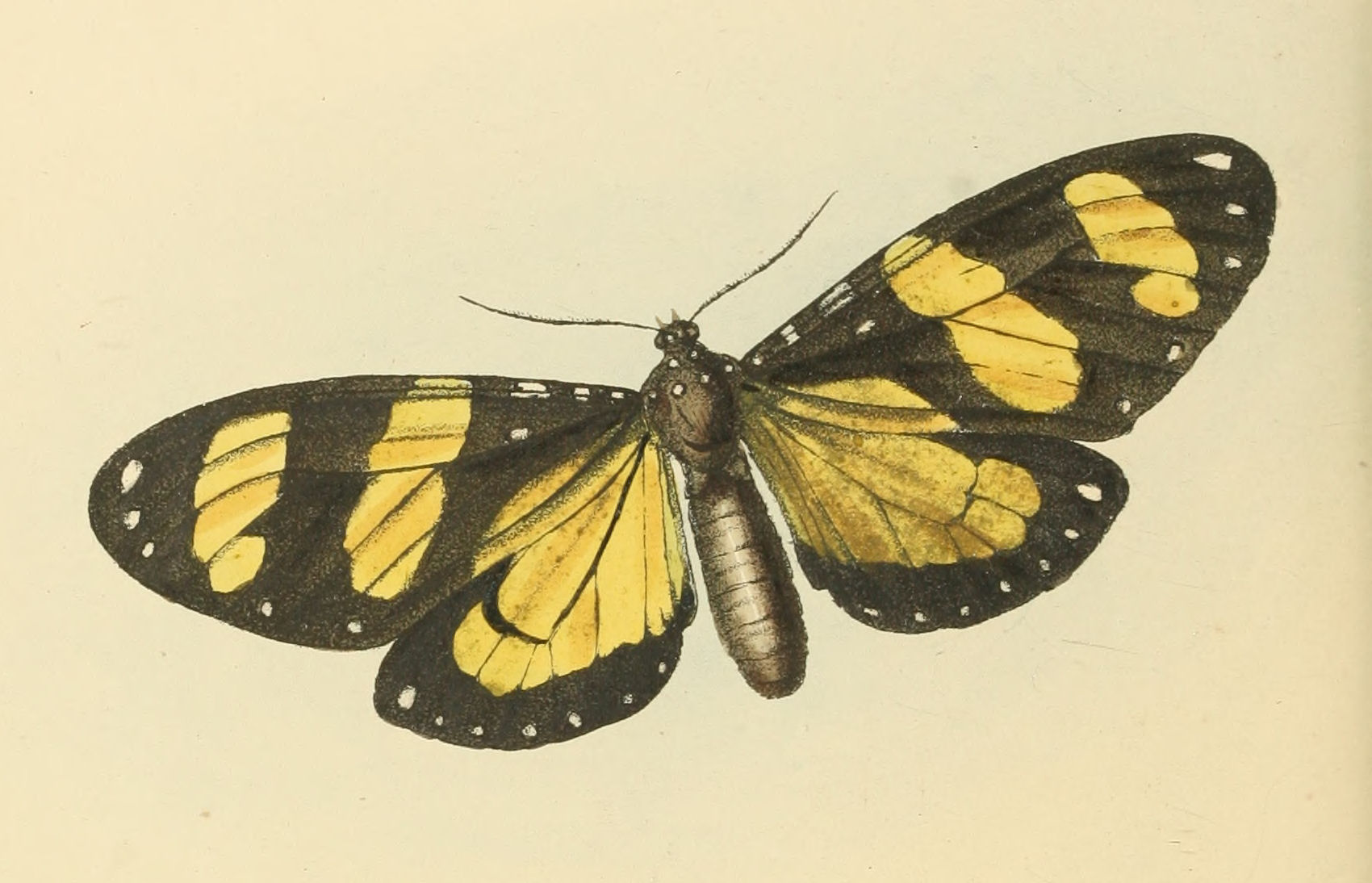

Scientific classification
- Kingdom: Animalia
- Phylum: Arthropoda
- Clade: Pancrustacea
- Class: Insecta
- Order: Lepidoptera
- Superfamily: Noctuoidea
- Family: Erebidae
- Subfamily: Arctiinae
- Genus: Notophyson
- Species: N. tiresias

Binomial name
- Notophyson tiresias (Cramer, 1776)

Synonyms
- Phalaena tiresias Cramer, [1776]; Hyelosia clio Hübner, [1819]; Anthomyxa swainsoni Druce, 1895

= Notophyson tiresias =

Species of moth

Notophyson tiresias is a moth of the subfamily Arctiinae. It was described by Pieter Cramer in 1776. It is found in Suriname.
