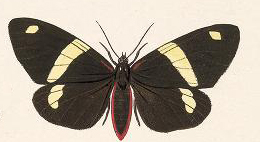
- Pseudophaloe helotes

Scientific classification
- Kingdom: Animalia
- Phylum: Arthropoda
- Class: Insecta
- Order: Lepidoptera
- Superfamily: Noctuoidea
- Family: Erebidae
- Subfamily: Arctiinae
- Genus: Pseudophaloe
- Species: P. helotes

Binomial name
- Pseudophaloe helotes (H. Druce, 1884)

Synonyms
- Phaloe helotes H. Druce, 1884

= Pseudophaloe helotes =

Species of moth

Pseudophaloe helotes is a moth in the family Erebidae. It was described by Herbert Druce in 1884. It is found in Panama.
