= Antiotricha cecata =

Scientific classification
- Domain: Eukaryota
- Kingdom: Animalia
- Phylum: Arthropoda
- Class: Insecta
- Order: Lepidoptera
- Superfamily: Noctuoidea
- Family: Erebidae
- Subfamily: Arctiinae
- Genus: Antiotricha
- Species: A. cecata

Binomial name
- Antiotricha cecata (Dognin, 1900)

Synonyms
- Darna cecata Dognin, 1900

Species of moth

Antiotricha cecata is a moth of the subfamily Arctiinae. It was described by Paul Dognin in 1900. It is found in Ecuador.
