= Cyanarctia percurrens =

Scientific classification
- Domain: Eukaryota
- Kingdom: Animalia
- Phylum: Arthropoda
- Class: Insecta
- Order: Lepidoptera
- Superfamily: Noctuoidea
- Family: Erebidae
- Subfamily: Arctiinae
- Genus: Cyanarctia
- Species: C. percurrens

Binomial name
- Cyanarctia percurrens (Warren, 1905)

Synonyms
- Ephialtias percurrens Warren, 1905

Species of moth

Cyanarctia percurrens is a moth of the subfamily Arctiinae. It was described by William Warren in 1905. It is found in Peru.
