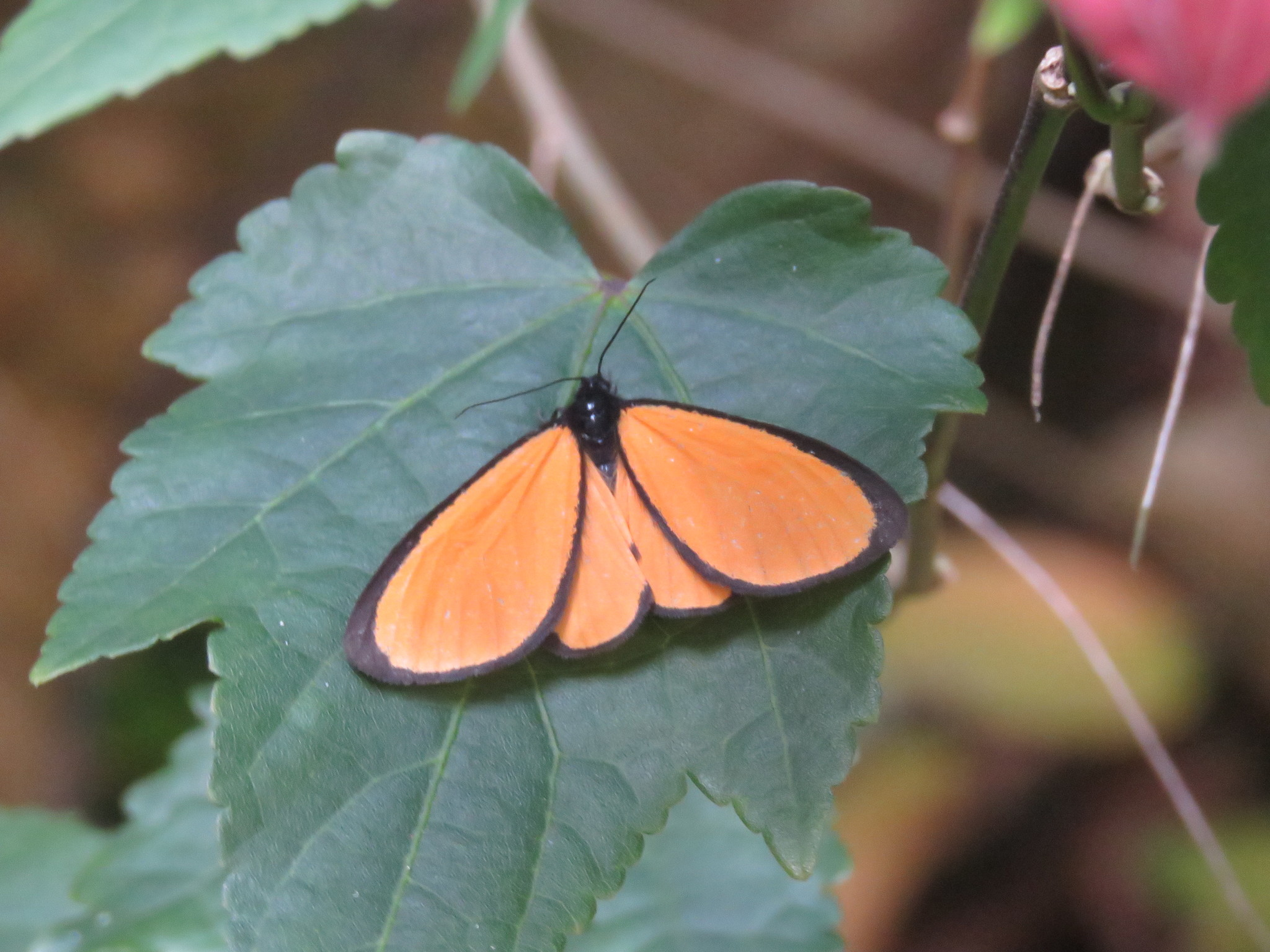

Scientific classification
- Kingdom: Animalia
- Phylum: Arthropoda
- Class: Insecta
- Order: Lepidoptera
- Superfamily: Noctuoidea
- Family: Erebidae
- Subfamily: Arctiinae
- Genus: Antiotricha
- Species: A. integra

Binomial name
- Antiotricha integra (Walker, 1865)

Synonyms
- Mennis integra Walker, [1865]; Antiotricha vexata Felder, 1874

= Antiotricha integra =

Species of moth

Antiotricha integra is a moth of the subfamily Arctiinae. It was described by Francis Walker in 1865. It is found in Colombia.
