= Heliactinidia nigrilinea =

Scientific classification
- Kingdom: Animalia
- Phylum: Arthropoda
- Class: Insecta
- Order: Lepidoptera
- Superfamily: Noctuoidea
- Family: Erebidae
- Subfamily: Arctiinae
- Genus: Heliactinidia
- Species: H. nigrilinea

Binomial name
- Heliactinidia nigrilinea (Walker, 1865)

Synonyms
- Spiris nigrilinea Walker, 1856

Species of moth

Heliactinidia nigrilinea is a moth of the subfamily Arctiinae. It was described by Francis Walker in 1865. It is found in Brazil.
