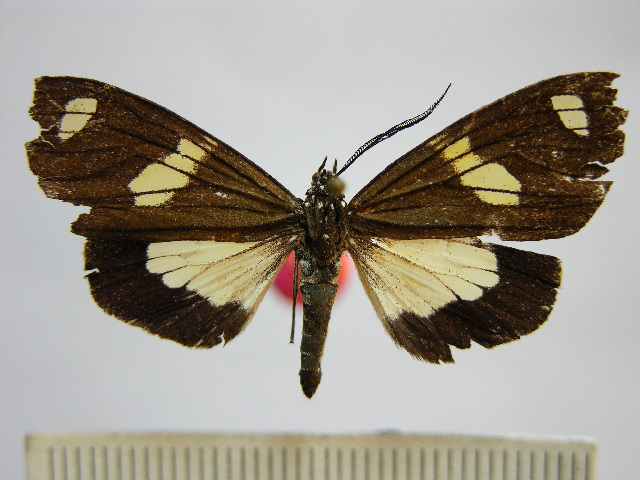

Scientific classification
- Kingdom: Animalia
- Phylum: Arthropoda
- Class: Insecta
- Order: Lepidoptera
- Superfamily: Noctuoidea
- Family: Erebidae
- Subfamily: Arctiinae
- Genus: Pseudophaloe
- Species: P. patula

Binomial name
- Pseudophaloe patula (Walker, 1854)

Synonyms
- Pericopis patula Walker, 1854

= Pseudophaloe patula =

Species of moth

Pseudophaloe patula is a moth of the family Erebidae first described by Francis Walker in 1854. It is found in Bolivia.
