= Phaloe lorzae =

Scientific classification
- Kingdom: Animalia
- Phylum: Arthropoda
- Clade: Pancrustacea
- Class: Insecta
- Order: Lepidoptera
- Superfamily: Noctuoidea
- Family: Erebidae
- Subfamily: Arctiinae
- Genus: Phaloe
- Species: P. lorzae

Binomial name
- Phaloe lorzae (Boisduval, 1870)

Synonyms
- Chetone lorzae Boisduval, 1870

Species of moth

Phaloe lorzae is a moth in the subfamily Arctiinae. It was described by Jean Baptiste Boisduval in 1870. It is found in Guatemala.
