= Ctenuchidia butus =

Scientific classification
- Domain: Eukaryota
- Kingdom: Animalia
- Phylum: Arthropoda
- Class: Insecta
- Order: Lepidoptera
- Superfamily: Noctuoidea
- Family: Erebidae
- Subfamily: Arctiinae
- Genus: Ctenuchidia
- Species: C. butus

Binomial name
- Ctenuchidia butus (Fabricius, 1787)

Synonyms
- Zygaena butus Fabricius, 1787; Sphinx pectinata Gmelin, [1790]

Species of moth

Ctenuchidia butus is a moth of the subfamily Arctiinae. It was described by Johan Christian Fabricius in 1787. It is found in South America.
