= Sthenognatha toddi =

Scientific classification
- Domain: Eukaryota
- Kingdom: Animalia
- Phylum: Arthropoda
- Class: Insecta
- Order: Lepidoptera
- Superfamily: Noctuoidea
- Family: Erebidae
- Subfamily: Arctiinae
- Genus: Sthenognatha
- Species: S. toddi

Binomial name
- Sthenognatha toddi Lane & Watson, 1975

Species of moth

Sthenognatha toddi is a moth in the family Erebidae. It was described by Maureen A. Lane and Allan Watson in 1975. It is found on Jamaica.
