= Thyrgis angustifascia =

Scientific classification
- Kingdom: Animalia
- Phylum: Arthropoda
- Clade: Pancrustacea
- Class: Insecta
- Order: Lepidoptera
- Superfamily: Noctuoidea
- Family: Erebidae
- Subfamily: Arctiinae
- Genus: Thyrgis
- Species: T. angustifascia

Binomial name
- Thyrgis angustifascia Hering, 1925

Species of moth

Thyrgis angustifascia is a moth in the subfamily Arctiinae. It was described by Hering in 1925. It is found in Bolivia.
