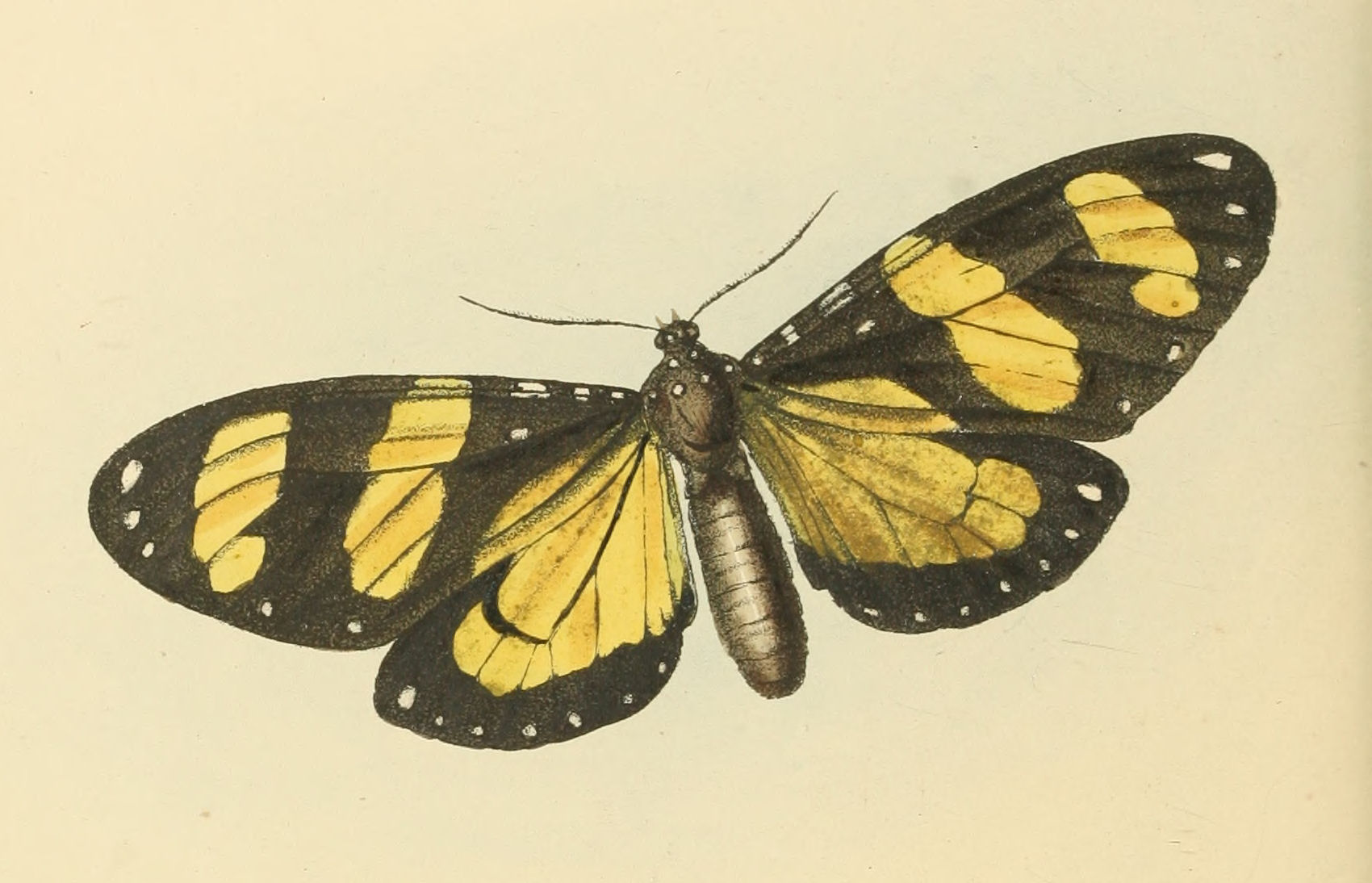
- Notophyson tiresias

Scientific classification
- Domain: Eukaryota
- Kingdom: Animalia
- Phylum: Arthropoda
- Class: Insecta
- Order: Lepidoptera
- Superfamily: Noctuoidea
- Family: Erebidae
- Subfamily: Arctiinae
- Subtribe: Pericopina
- Genus: Notophyson; Boisduval, 1870

Synonyms
- Anthomyza Swainson, 1833

= Notophyson =

Genus of moths

Notophyson is a genus of moths in the subfamily Arctiinae erected by Jean Baptiste Boisduval in 1870.

== Species ==
- Notophyson brotes Druce, 1895
- Notophyson buckleyi Druce, 1895
- Notophyson heliconides Swainson, 1833
- Notophyson praxila Druce, 1895
- Notophyson tiresias Cramer, 1776
