= Heliactinidia sitia =

Scientific classification
- Domain: Eukaryota
- Kingdom: Animalia
- Phylum: Arthropoda
- Class: Insecta
- Order: Lepidoptera
- Superfamily: Noctuoidea
- Family: Erebidae
- Subfamily: Arctiinae
- Genus: Heliactinidia
- Species: H. sitia

Binomial name
- Heliactinidia sitia Schaus, 1910

Species of moth

Heliactinidia sitia is a moth of the subfamily Arctiinae. It was described by William Schaus in 1910. It is found in Costa Rica.
