= Cyanarctia flavinigra =

Scientific classification
- Domain: Eukaryota
- Kingdom: Animalia
- Phylum: Arthropoda
- Class: Insecta
- Order: Lepidoptera
- Superfamily: Noctuoidea
- Family: Erebidae
- Subfamily: Arctiinae
- Genus: Cyanarctia
- Species: C. flavinigra

Binomial name
- Cyanarctia flavinigra Dognin, 1910

Species of moth

Cyanarctia flavinigra is a moth of the subfamily Arctiinae. It was described by Paul Dognin in 1910. It is found in Colombia.
