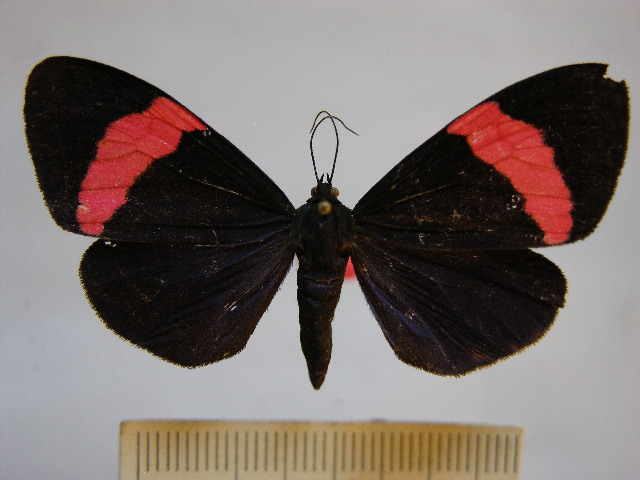
- Thyrgis ruscia phlegon

Scientific classification
- Kingdom: Animalia
- Phylum: Arthropoda
- Clade: Pancrustacea
- Class: Insecta
- Order: Lepidoptera
- Superfamily: Noctuoidea
- Family: Erebidae
- Subfamily: Arctiinae
- Genus: Thyrgis
- Species: T. ruscia

Binomial name
- Thyrgis ruscia (H. Druce, 1895)

Synonyms
- Eucyane ruscia H. Druce, 1895; Eucyane phlegon H. Druce, 1885; Hypocrita phlegon

= Thyrgis ruscia =

Species of moth

Thyrgis ruscia is a moth of the subfamily Arctiinae. It was described by Herbert Druce in 1895. It is found in Bolivia and Ecuador.

== Subspecies ==
- Thyrgis ruscia ruscia (Bolivia)
- Thyrgis ruscia phlegon (H. Druce, 1885) (Ecuador)
