= Mesenochroa =

Scientific classification
- Kingdom: Animalia
- Phylum: Arthropoda
- Clade: Pancrustacea
- Class: Insecta
- Order: Lepidoptera
- Superfamily: Noctuoidea
- Family: Erebidae
- Subfamily: Arctiinae
- Subtribe: Pericopina
- Genus: Mesenochroa; Felder, 1874

Genus of moths

Mesenochroa is a genus of moths in the subfamily Arctiinae described by Felder in 1874.

== Species ==
- Mesenochroa guatemalteca Felder, 1874
- Mesenochroa rogersi Druce, 1885
