= Heliactinidia dispar =

Scientific classification
- Domain: Eukaryota
- Kingdom: Animalia
- Phylum: Arthropoda
- Class: Insecta
- Order: Lepidoptera
- Superfamily: Noctuoidea
- Family: Erebidae
- Subfamily: Arctiinae
- Genus: Heliactinidia
- Species: H. dispar

Binomial name
- Heliactinidia dispar (Warren, 1907)

Synonyms
- Brachyglene dispar Warren, 1907

Species of moth

Heliactinidia dispar is a moth of the subfamily Arctiinae. It was described by Warren in 1907. It is found in Argentina.
