= Antiotricha districta =

Scientific classification
- Kingdom: Animalia
- Phylum: Arthropoda
- Class: Insecta
- Order: Lepidoptera
- Superfamily: Noctuoidea
- Family: Erebidae
- Subfamily: Arctiinae
- Genus: Antiotricha
- Species: A. districta

Binomial name
- Antiotricha districta (Walker, 1865)

Synonyms
- Mennis districta Walker, [1865]

Species of moth

Antiotricha districta is a moth of the subfamily Arctiinae. It was described by Francis Walker in 1865. It is found in Colombia.
