= Didaphne =

Scientific classification
- Kingdom: Animalia
- Phylum: Arthropoda
- Class: Insecta
- Order: Lepidoptera
- Superfamily: Noctuoidea
- Family: Erebidae
- Subfamily: Arctiinae
- Subtribe: Pericopina
- Genus: Didaphne; Berg, 1899
- Species: D. cyanomela

Binomial name
- Didaphne cyanomela (Neumoegen, 1894)

Synonyms
- Generic: Daphne Neumoegen, 1894; Specific: Daphne cyanomela Neumoegen, 1894

Genus of moths

Didaphne is a monotypic moth genus in the subfamily Arctiinae erected by Carlos Berg in 1899. Its only species, Didaphne cyanomela, was described by Berthold Neumoegen in 1894. It is found on Cuba.
