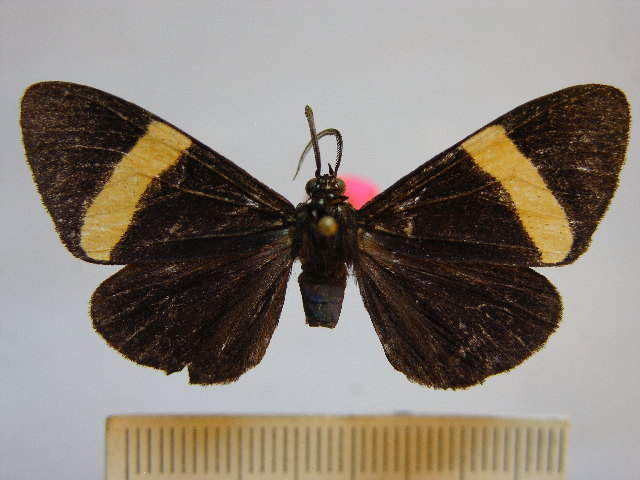

Scientific classification
- Kingdom: Animalia
- Phylum: Arthropoda
- Clade: Pancrustacea
- Class: Insecta
- Order: Lepidoptera
- Superfamily: Noctuoidea
- Family: Erebidae
- Subfamily: Arctiinae
- Genus: Thyrgis
- Species: T. militta

Binomial name
- Thyrgis militta (Stoll, [1781])

Synonyms
- Phalaena militta Stoll, [1781]; Hypocrita militta

= Thyrgis militta =

Species of moth

Thyrgis militta is a moth of the subfamily Arctiinae. It was described by Caspar Stoll in 1781. It is found in Bolivia, Suriname, Venezuela and Peru.
