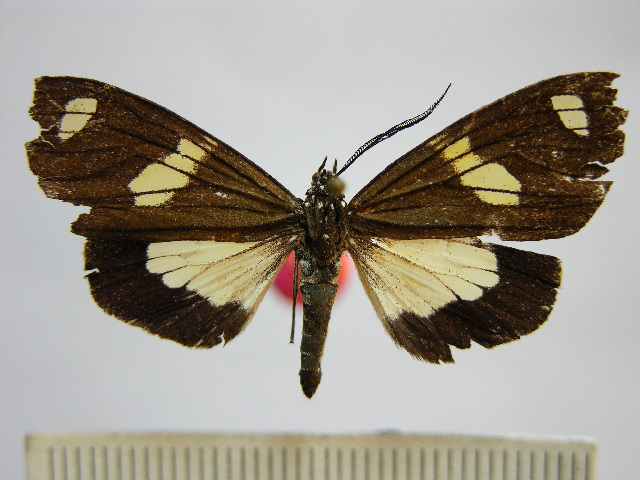
- Pseudophaloe patula

Scientific classification
- Domain: Eukaryota
- Kingdom: Animalia
- Phylum: Arthropoda
- Class: Insecta
- Order: Lepidoptera
- Superfamily: Noctuoidea
- Family: Erebidae
- Subfamily: Arctiinae
- Subtribe: Pericopina
- Genus: Pseudophaloe; Hering, 1925

= Pseudophaloe =

Genus of moths

Pseudophaloe is a genus of tiger moths in the family Erebidae. The genus was described by Hering in 1925.

== Species ==
- Pseudophaloe cerealia (Druce, 1884)
- Pseudophaloe helotes (Druce, 1884)
- Pseudophaloe isosoma (Prout, 1920)
- Pseudophaloe latifascia Hering, 1925
- Pseudophaloe ninonia (Druce, 1884)
- Pseudophaloe patula (Walker, 1854)
- Pseudophaloe promiscua Becker & Espinosa, 2013
- Pseudophaloe schausii (H. Edwards, 1884)
- Pseudophaloe stenoxantha Hering, 1925
- Pseudophaloe tellina (Weymer, 1895)
- Pseudophaloe tellinoides Hering, 1925
- Pseudophaloe tessmanni Hering, 1925
- Pseudophaloe triangulata (Dognin, 1919)
- Pseudophaloe troetschi (Druce, 1884)
- Pseudophaloe xiphydria Zerny, 1928
