= Pseudophaloe xiphydria =

Scientific classification
- Domain: Eukaryota
- Kingdom: Animalia
- Phylum: Arthropoda
- Class: Insecta
- Order: Lepidoptera
- Superfamily: Noctuoidea
- Family: Erebidae
- Subfamily: Arctiinae
- Genus: Pseudophaloe
- Species: P. xiphydria

Binomial name
- Pseudophaloe xiphydria Zerny, 1928

Species of moth

Pseudophaloe xiphydria is a moth in the family Erebidae. It was described by Hans Zerny in 1928. It is found in Colombia.
