= Antiotricha pluricincta =

Scientific classification
- Domain: Eukaryota
- Kingdom: Animalia
- Phylum: Arthropoda
- Class: Insecta
- Order: Lepidoptera
- Superfamily: Noctuoidea
- Family: Erebidae
- Subfamily: Arctiinae
- Genus: Antiotricha
- Species: A. pluricincta

Binomial name
- Antiotricha pluricincta (Dognin, 1918)

Synonyms
- Darna pluricincta Dognin, 1918

Species of moth

Antiotricha pluricincta is a moth of the subfamily Arctiinae. It was described by Paul Dognin in 1918. It is found in Colombia.
