= Josiomorphoides gigantea =

Scientific classification
- Kingdom: Animalia
- Phylum: Arthropoda
- Clade: Pancrustacea
- Class: Insecta
- Order: Lepidoptera
- Superfamily: Noctuoidea
- Family: Erebidae
- Subfamily: Arctiinae
- Genus: Josiomorphoides
- Species: J. gigantea

Binomial name
- Josiomorphoides gigantea (H. Druce, 1897)

Synonyms
- Josia gigantea H. Druce, 1897 (not H. Druce, 1885); Josiomorpha flammata Dognin, 1909

Species of moth

Josiomorphoides gigantea is a moth of the subfamily Arctiinae first described by Herbert Druce in 1897. It is found in Panama and Colombia.
