= Ctenuchidia virginalis =

Scientific classification
- Kingdom: Animalia
- Phylum: Arthropoda
- Clade: Pancrustacea
- Class: Insecta
- Order: Lepidoptera
- Superfamily: Noctuoidea
- Family: Erebidae
- Subfamily: Arctiinae
- Genus: Ctenuchidia
- Species: C. virginalis

Binomial name
- Ctenuchidia virginalis Forbes, 1930

Species of moth

Ctenuchidia virginalis is a moth of the subfamily Arctiinae. It was described by William Trowbridge Merrifield Forbes in 1930. It is found in Puerto Rico.
