= Heliactinidia flavivena =

Scientific classification
- Kingdom: Animalia
- Phylum: Arthropoda
- Clade: Pancrustacea
- Class: Insecta
- Order: Lepidoptera
- Superfamily: Noctuoidea
- Family: Erebidae
- Subfamily: Arctiinae
- Genus: Heliactinidia
- Species: H. flavivena

Binomial name
- Heliactinidia flavivena Dognin, 1909

Species of moth

Heliactinidia flavivena is a moth of the subfamily Arctiinae. It was described by Paul Dognin in 1909. It is found in Colombia.
