= Phaloe vogli =

Scientific classification
- Kingdom: Animalia
- Phylum: Arthropoda
- Clade: Pancrustacea
- Class: Insecta
- Order: Lepidoptera
- Superfamily: Noctuoidea
- Family: Erebidae
- Subfamily: Arctiinae
- Genus: Phaloe
- Species: P. vogli

Binomial name
- Phaloe vogli Daniel, 1966

Species of moth

Phaloe vogli is a moth in the subfamily Arctiinae. It was described by Franz Daniel in 1966. It is found in Venezuela.
