= Episcea extravagans =

Scientific classification
- Domain: Eukaryota
- Kingdom: Animalia
- Phylum: Arthropoda
- Class: Insecta
- Order: Lepidoptera
- Superfamily: Noctuoidea
- Family: Erebidae
- Subfamily: Arctiinae
- Genus: Episcea
- Species: E. extravagans

Binomial name
- Episcea extravagans Warren, 1901

Species of moth

Episcea extravagans is a moth of the family Erebidae. It was described by Warren in 1901. It is found in Brazil.
