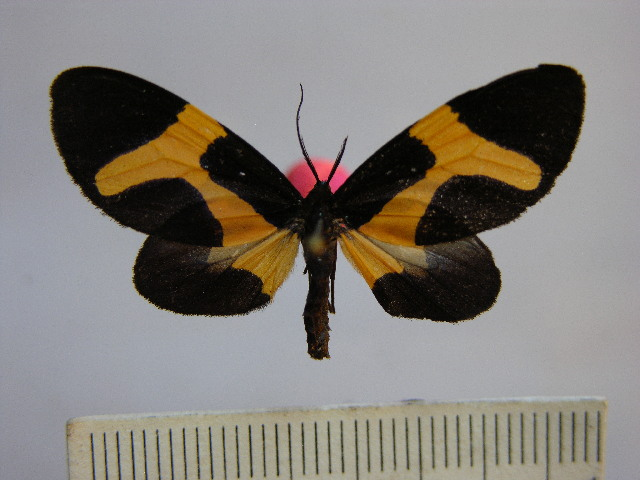

Scientific classification
- Kingdom: Animalia
- Phylum: Arthropoda
- Class: Insecta
- Order: Lepidoptera
- Superfamily: Noctuoidea
- Family: Erebidae
- Subfamily: Arctiinae
- Subtribe: Pericopina
- Genus: Heliactinidia; Hampson, 1901

= Heliactinidia =

Genus of moths

Heliactinidia is a genus of moths in the subfamily Arctiinae. The genus was erected by George Hampson in 1901.

== Selected species ==
- Heliactinidia austriaca Seitz, 1919 Ecuador
- Heliactinidia caerulescens Hampson, 1901 Colombia
- Heliactinidia chiguinda (Druce, 1885) Colombia, Ecuador, Peru
- Heliactinidia dispar (Warren, 1907) Argentina
- Heliactinidia flavivena Dognin, 1909 Colombia
- Heliactinidia hodeva (Druce, 1906) Peru
- Heliactinidia nigrilinea (Walker, 1856) Espírito Santo in Brazil
- Heliactinidia sitia Schaus, 1910 Costa Rica
- Heliactinidia tornensis Prout, 1918 Colombia
- Heliactinidia vespertilio (Dognin, 1911) Colombia
