= Antiotricha directa =

Scientific classification
- Domain: Eukaryota
- Kingdom: Animalia
- Phylum: Arthropoda
- Class: Insecta
- Order: Lepidoptera
- Superfamily: Noctuoidea
- Family: Erebidae
- Subfamily: Arctiinae
- Genus: Antiotricha
- Species: A. directa

Binomial name
- Antiotricha directa Dognin, 1924

Species of moth

Antiotricha directa is a moth of the subfamily Arctiinae. It was described by Paul Dognin in 1924. It is found in Colombia.
