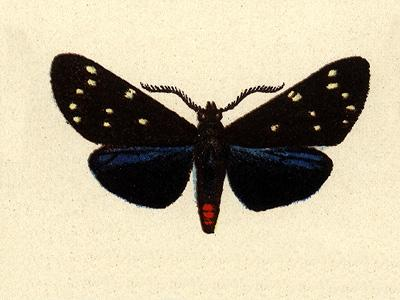
- Ctenuchidia virgo

Scientific classification
- Kingdom: Animalia
- Phylum: Arthropoda
- Class: Insecta
- Order: Lepidoptera
- Superfamily: Noctuoidea
- Family: Erebidae
- Subfamily: Arctiinae
- Subtribe: Pericopina
- Genus: Ctenuchidia; Grote, [1866]

= Ctenuchidia =

Genus of moths

Ctenuchidia is a genus of moths in the subfamily Arctiinae. The genus was erected by Augustus Radcliffe Grote in 1866.

== Species ==
- Ctenuchidia agrius (Fabricius, 1781)
- Ctenuchidia butus (Fabricius, 1787)
- Ctenuchidia fulvibasis Hering, 1925
- Ctenuchidia gundlachia (Schaus, 1904)
- Ctenuchidia interrupta Hering, 1925
- Ctenuchidia subcyanea (Walker, 1854)
- Ctenuchidia virginalis Forbes, 1930
- Ctenuchidia virgo (Herrich-Schäffer, [1855])
