= Euchlaenidia erconvalda =

Scientific classification
- Domain: Eukaryota
- Kingdom: Animalia
- Phylum: Arthropoda
- Class: Insecta
- Order: Lepidoptera
- Superfamily: Noctuoidea
- Family: Erebidae
- Subfamily: Arctiinae
- Genus: Euchlaenidia
- Species: E. erconvalda

Binomial name
- Euchlaenidia erconvalda Schaus, 1933

Species of moth

Euchlaenidia erconvalda is a moth of the family Erebidae. It was described by William Schaus in 1933. It is found in Bolivia.
