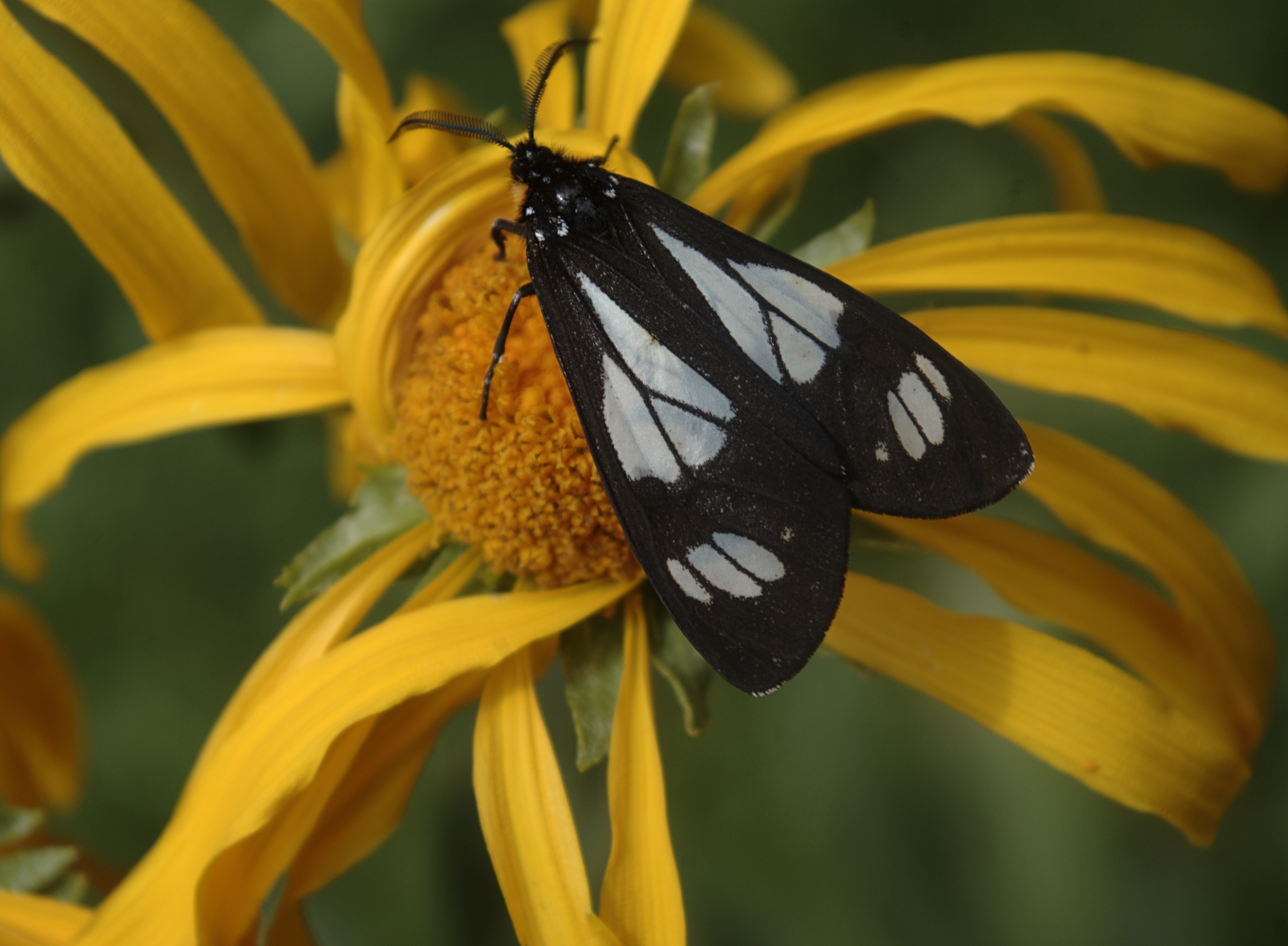

Scientific classification
- Kingdom: Animalia
- Phylum: Arthropoda
- Class: Insecta
- Order: Lepidoptera
- Superfamily: Noctuoidea
- Family: Erebidae
- Subfamily: Arctiinae
- Genus: Gnophaela
- Species: G. vermiculata

Binomial name
- Gnophaela vermiculata (Grote, 1864)

Synonyms
- Omoiala vermiculata Grote, [1864]; Gnophaela continua H. Edwards, 1881

= Gnophaela vermiculata =

Species of moth

Gnophaela vermiculata, sometimes known as the police-car moth or green lattice, is a moth of the family Erebidae. The species was first described by Augustus Radcliffe Grote in 1864. It is found in the Rocky Mountain region of the United States and in western parts of North America, from British Columbia to California, east to New Mexico and north to Alberta Manitoba.

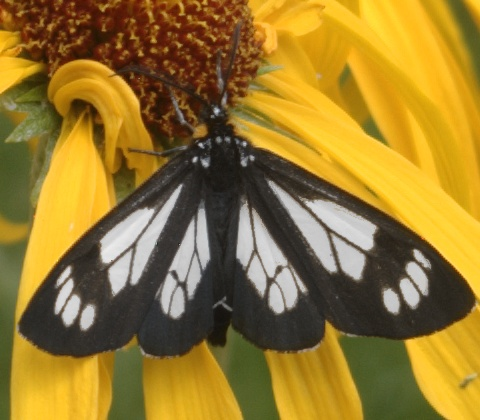

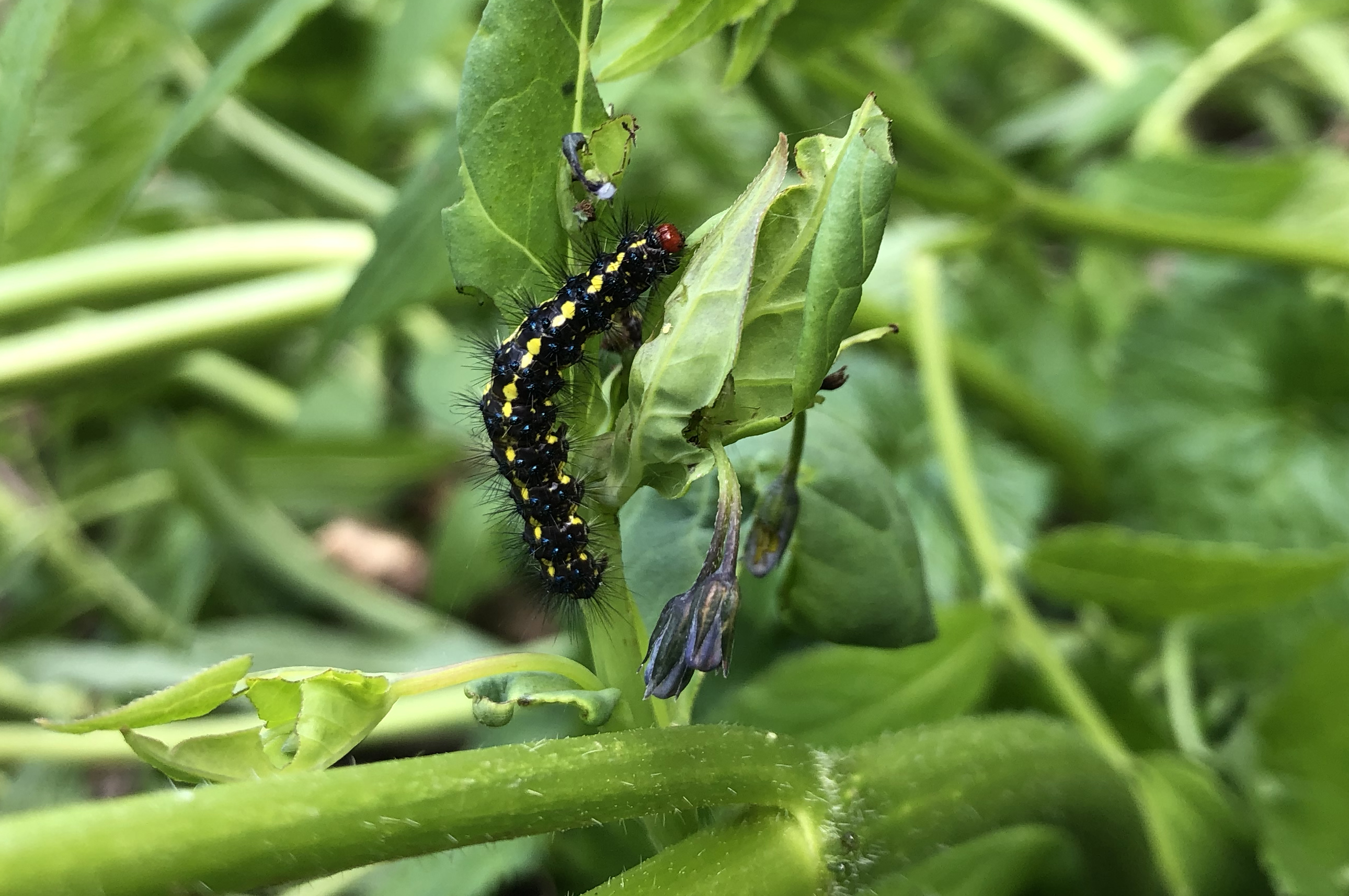
Caterpillar on Mertensia paniculata

The wingspan is about 54 millimetres (2.1 in). Adults are on wing in late summer and fly during the day. There is one generation per year. The larva is born with yellower patches but eventually grows into the adult coloring. As larvae, they feed on Mertensia, Lithospermum and Hackelia species. Adults feed on nectar of various herbaceous flowers, including Cirsium and Solidago.

It can be confused with Gnophaela latipennis because of the similarity in their pattern. The latter species has smaller pale areas on its wings and more rounded forewing margins.
