= Ctenuchidia gundlachia =

Scientific classification
- Kingdom: Animalia
- Phylum: Arthropoda
- Class: Insecta
- Order: Lepidoptera
- Superfamily: Noctuoidea
- Family: Erebidae
- Subfamily: Arctiinae
- Genus: Ctenuchidia
- Species: C. gundlachia

Binomial name
- Ctenuchidia gundlachia (Schaus, 1904)

Synonyms
- Eucyane gundlachia Schaus, 1904

Species of moth

Ctenuchidia gundlachia is a moth of the subfamily Arctiinae. It was described by William Schaus in 1904. It is found on Cuba.
