= Cyanarctia =

Scientific classification
- Kingdom: Animalia
- Phylum: Arthropoda
- Class: Insecta
- Order: Lepidoptera
- Superfamily: Noctuoidea
- Family: Erebidae
- Subfamily: Arctiinae
- Subtribe: Pericopina
- Genus: Cyanarctia; Hampson, 1901

Synonyms
- Cynarctia Strand, 1919

Genus of moths

Cyanarctia is a genus of moths in the family Erebidae. The genus was erected by George Hampson in 1901.

== Species ==
- Cyanarctia dama Druce, 1894
- Cyanarctia flavinigra Dognin, 1910
- Cyanarctia percurrens Warren, 1905
