= Syntomidopsis gundlachiana =

Scientific classification
- Kingdom: Animalia
- Phylum: Arthropoda
- Clade: Pancrustacea
- Class: Insecta
- Order: Lepidoptera
- Superfamily: Noctuoidea
- Family: Erebidae
- Subfamily: Arctiinae
- Genus: Syntomidopsis
- Species: S. gundlachiana

Binomial name
- Syntomidopsis gundlachiana (Neumoegen, 1890)

Synonyms
- Ira gundlachiana Neumoegen, 1890

Species of moth

Syntomidopsis gundlachiana is a moth in the subfamily Arctiinae. It was described by Berthold Neumoegen in 1890. It is found on Cuba.
