= Josiomorphoides =

Scientific classification
- Kingdom: Animalia
- Phylum: Arthropoda
- Clade: Pancrustacea
- Class: Insecta
- Order: Lepidoptera
- Superfamily: Noctuoidea
- Family: Erebidae
- Subfamily: Arctiinae
- Subtribe: Pericopina
- Genus: Josiomorphoides; Hering, 1925

Genus of moths

Josiomorphoides is a genus of moths in the subfamily Arctiinae. The genus was described by Hering in 1925.

== Species ==
- Josiomorphoides gigantea (Druce, 1897)
- Josiomorphoides dognini Hering, 1925
