= Josiomorpha cathetozosta =

Scientific classification
- Kingdom: Animalia
- Phylum: Arthropoda
- Clade: Pancrustacea
- Class: Insecta
- Order: Lepidoptera
- Superfamily: Noctuoidea
- Family: Erebidae
- Subfamily: Arctiinae
- Genus: Josiomorpha
- Species: J. cathetozosta

Binomial name
- Josiomorpha cathetozosta Becker, 2013

Species of moth

Josiomorpha cathetozosta is a moth of the subfamily Arctiinae first described by Vitor Osmar Becker in 2013. It is found in Guatemala.

The length of the forewings is about 22 mm.
