= Pseudophaloe promiscua =

Scientific classification
- Domain: Eukaryota
- Kingdom: Animalia
- Phylum: Arthropoda
- Class: Insecta
- Order: Lepidoptera
- Superfamily: Noctuoidea
- Family: Erebidae
- Subfamily: Arctiinae
- Genus: Pseudophaloe
- Species: P. promiscua

Binomial name
- Pseudophaloe promiscua Becker & Espinosa, 2013

Species of moth

Pseudophaloe promiscua is a moth of the family Erebidae first described by Vitor Osmar Becker and Espinosa in 2013. It is found in Costa Rica.

The length of the forewings is about 23 mm for males.`

== Etymology ==
The species name is derived from Latin promiscuus (meaning mixed).
