= Xenosoma =

Scientific classification
- Domain: Eukaryota
- Kingdom: Animalia
- Phylum: Arthropoda
- Class: Insecta
- Order: Lepidoptera
- Superfamily: Noctuoidea
- Family: Erebidae
- Subfamily: Arctiinae
- Subtribe: Pericopina
- Genus: Xenosoma; Felder, 1874

Synonyms
- Cyphopora Warren, 1900

Genus of moths

Xenosoma is a genus of moths in the subfamily Arctiinae. The genus was described by Felder in 1874.

== Species ==
- Xenosoma bryki Hering, 1943 Colombia
- Xenosoma dubia (Warren, 1900) Ecuador
- Xenosoma flaviceps (Walker, 1865) Mexico, Guatemala
- Xenosoma flavisedes Dognin, 1891 Venezuela
- Xenosoma geometrina (Schaus, 1910) Costa Rica
- Xenosoma nicander H. Druce, 1886 Costa Rica, Panama
- Xenosoma nigromarginatum H. Druce, 1886 Costa Rica
- Xenosoma oratesina (Dognin, 1916) Peru, Bolivia
