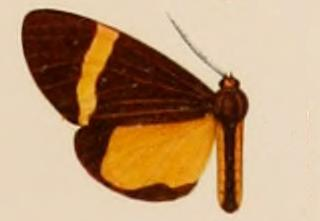

Scientific classification
- Domain: Eukaryota
- Kingdom: Animalia
- Phylum: Arthropoda
- Class: Insecta
- Order: Lepidoptera
- Superfamily: Noctuoidea
- Family: Erebidae
- Subfamily: Arctiinae
- Genus: Euchlaenidia
- Species: E. ockendeni

Binomial name
- Euchlaenidia ockendeni Rothschild, 1910

= Euchlaenidia ockendeni =

Species of moth

Euchlaenidia ockendeni is a moth of the family Erebidae first described by Rothschild in 1910. It is found in Peru.
