= Thyrgis childon =

Scientific classification
- Kingdom: Animalia
- Phylum: Arthropoda
- Clade: Pancrustacea
- Class: Insecta
- Order: Lepidoptera
- Superfamily: Noctuoidea
- Family: Erebidae
- Subfamily: Arctiinae
- Genus: Thyrgis
- Species: T. childon

Binomial name
- Thyrgis childon (H. Druce, 1885)

Synonyms
- Eucyana childon H. Druce, 1885; Thyrgis colombiana Hering, 1925

Species of moth

Thyrgis childon is a moth in the subfamily Arctiinae. It was described by Herbert Druce in 1885. It is found in Ecuador and Colombia.

== Subspecies ==
- Thyrgis childon childon (Ecuador)
- Thyrgis childon colombiana Hering, 1925 (Colombia)
