= Episcea =

Scientific classification
- Domain: Eukaryota
- Kingdom: Animalia
- Phylum: Arthropoda
- Class: Insecta
- Order: Lepidoptera
- Superfamily: Noctuoidea
- Family: Erebidae
- Subfamily: Arctiinae
- Subtribe: Pericopina
- Genus: Episcea; Warren, 1901

Genus of moths

Episcea is a genus of tiger moths in the family Erebidae. The genus was described by Warren in 1901.

== Species ==
- Episcea extravagans Warren, 1901
- Episcea sancta Warren, 1901
