= Pseudophaloe triangulata =

Scientific classification
- Domain: Eukaryota
- Kingdom: Animalia
- Phylum: Arthropoda
- Class: Insecta
- Order: Lepidoptera
- Superfamily: Noctuoidea
- Family: Erebidae
- Subfamily: Arctiinae
- Genus: Pseudophaloe
- Species: P. triangulata

Binomial name
- Pseudophaloe triangulata (Dognin, 1919)

Synonyms
- Pericopis triangulata Dognin, 1919

Species of moth

Pseudophaloe triangulata is a moth in the family Erebidae. It was described by Paul Dognin in 1919. It is found in Bolivia.
