= Sthenognatha =

Scientific classification
- Domain: Eukaryota
- Kingdom: Animalia
- Phylum: Arthropoda
- Class: Insecta
- Order: Lepidoptera
- Superfamily: Noctuoidea
- Family: Erebidae
- Subfamily: Arctiinae
- Subtribe: Pericopina
- Genus: Sthenognatha; Felder & Felder, 1874

Synonyms
- Stenognatha Rogenhofer, 1875

Genus of moths

Sthenognatha is a genus of tiger moths in the family Erebidae. There is some confusion surrounding the subsequent spelling by Rogenhofer, 1875, as Stenognatha; this spelling was used by many authors prior to 1980, and under ICZN Article 33.3.1 it may need to be preserved, though many authors after 1980 have reverted to Sthenognatha (e.g.).

== Species ==
- Sthenognatha cinda Schaus, 1938
- Sthenognatha flinti Todd, 1982
- Sthenognatha gentilis Felder & Felder, 1874
- Sthenognatha toddi Lane & Watson, 1975
