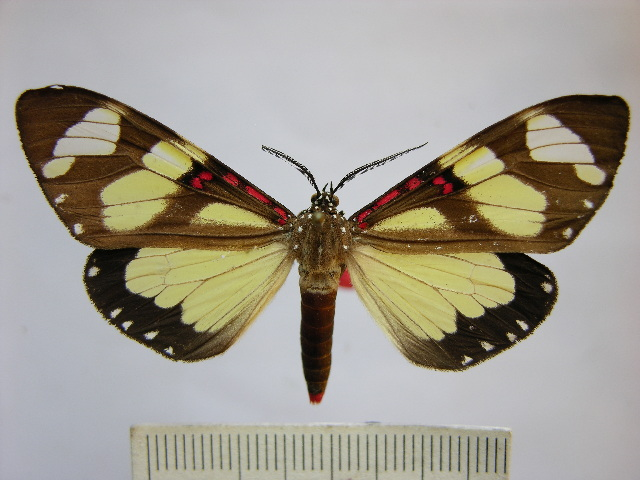
- Phaloe cruenta

Scientific classification
- Kingdom: Animalia
- Phylum: Arthropoda
- Clade: Pancrustacea
- Class: Insecta
- Order: Lepidoptera
- Superfamily: Noctuoidea
- Family: Erebidae
- Subfamily: Arctiinae
- Subtribe: Pericopina
- Genus: Phaloe; Guérin-Méneville, [1838]

Synonyms
- Sphaeromachia Grote, 1867

= Phaloe =

Genus of moths

Phaloe is a genus of moths in the subfamily Arctiinae. The genus was erected by Félix Édouard Guérin-Méneville in 1838.

== Species ==
- Phaloe cruenta (Hübner, 1823)
- Phaloe cubana (Herrich-Schäffer, 1866)
- Phaloe ignita (Butler, [1870])
- Phaloe lorzae (Boisduval, 1870)
- Phaloe pyste Druce, 1885
- Phaloe vespertilio Dognin, 1911
- Phaloe vogli Daniel, 1966
