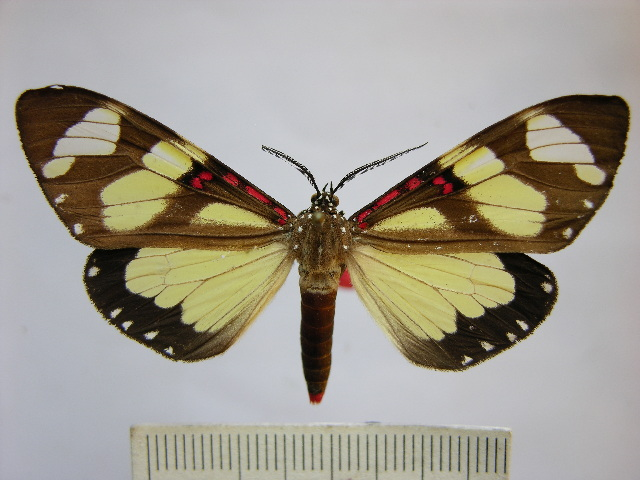

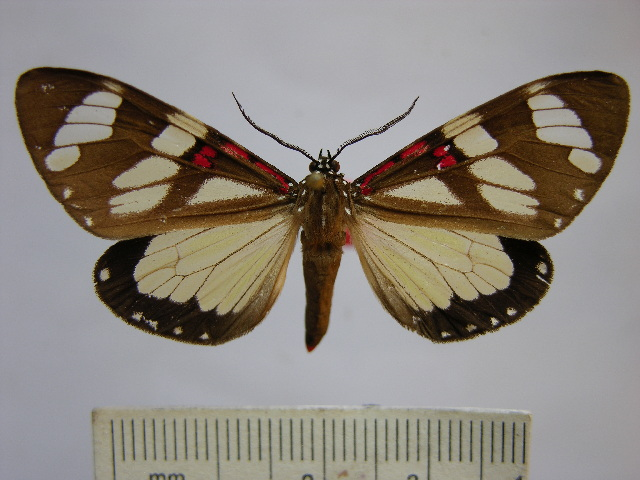

Scientific classification
- Kingdom: Animalia
- Phylum: Arthropoda
- Clade: Pancrustacea
- Class: Insecta
- Order: Lepidoptera
- Superfamily: Noctuoidea
- Family: Erebidae
- Subfamily: Arctiinae
- Genus: Phaloe
- Species: P. cruenta

Binomial name
- Phaloe cruenta (Hübner, 1823)

Synonyms
- Pericopis cruenta Hübner, 1823; Phaloe romani Bryk, 1953

= Phaloe cruenta =

Species of moth

Phaloe cruenta is a moth of the subfamily Arctiinae first described by Jacob Hübner in 1823. It is found in South America, including Brazil, Argentina, Paraguay, Bolivia and Uruguay.

The larvae have been recorded feeding on Eupatorium inulaefolium, Artemisa absynthium, Heliothropium tiaridoides and Tournefortia brachiata.
