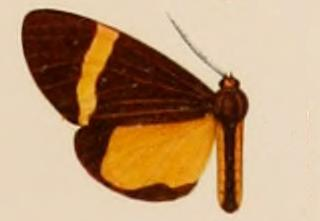
- Euchlaenidia ockendeni

Scientific classification
- Kingdom: Animalia
- Phylum: Arthropoda
- Class: Insecta
- Order: Lepidoptera
- Superfamily: Noctuoidea
- Family: Erebidae
- Subfamily: Arctiinae
- Subtribe: Pericopina
- Genus: Euchlaenidia; Hampson, 1901

= Euchlaenidia =

Genus of moths

Euchlaenidia is a genus of tiger moths in the family Erebidae. The genus was erected by George Hampson in 1901.

== Species ==
- Euchlaenidia albilinea (Schaus, 1912)
- Euchlaenidia erconvalda Schaus, 1933
- Euchlaenidia macallia Schaus, 1933
- Euchlaenidia neglecta Rothschild, 1910
- Euchlaenidia ockendeni Rothschild, 1910
- Euchlaenidia transcisa (Walker, 1854)
- Euchlaenidia wirthi Schaus, 1933
