= Pseudophaloe troetschi =

Scientific classification
- Domain: Eukaryota
- Kingdom: Animalia
- Phylum: Arthropoda
- Class: Insecta
- Order: Lepidoptera
- Superfamily: Noctuoidea
- Family: Erebidae
- Subfamily: Arctiinae
- Genus: Pseudophaloe
- Species: P. troetschi

Binomial name
- Pseudophaloe troetschi (H. Druce, 1884)

Synonyms
- Phaloe troetschi H. Druce, 1884; Phaloë trötschi H. Druce, 1884

Species of moth

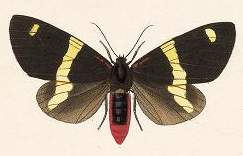

Pseudophaloe troetschi is a moth in the family Erebidae. It was described by Herbert Druce in 1884. It is found in Panama.
