= Pseudophaloe tellina =

Scientific classification
- Domain: Eukaryota
- Kingdom: Animalia
- Phylum: Arthropoda
- Class: Insecta
- Order: Lepidoptera
- Superfamily: Noctuoidea
- Family: Erebidae
- Subfamily: Arctiinae
- Genus: Pseudophaloe
- Species: P. tellina

Binomial name
- Pseudophaloe tellina (Weymer, 1895)

Synonyms
- Phaloe tellina Weymer, 1895

Species of moth

Pseudophaloe tellina is a moth in the family Erebidae. It was described by Weymer in 1895. It is found in Brazil.
