= Thyrgis marginata =

Scientific classification
- Kingdom: Animalia
- Phylum: Arthropoda
- Clade: Pancrustacea
- Class: Insecta
- Order: Lepidoptera
- Superfamily: Noctuoidea
- Family: Erebidae
- Subfamily: Arctiinae
- Genus: Thyrgis
- Species: T. marginata

Binomial name
- Thyrgis marginata (Butler, 1876)

Synonyms
- Calodesma marginata Butler, 1876

Species of moth

Thyrgis marginata is a moth in the subfamily Arctiinae. It was described by Arthur Gardiner Butler in 1876. It is found in South America.
