= Notophyson buckleyi =

Scientific classification
- Kingdom: Animalia
- Phylum: Arthropoda
- Clade: Pancrustacea
- Class: Insecta
- Order: Lepidoptera
- Superfamily: Noctuoidea
- Family: Erebidae
- Subfamily: Arctiinae
- Genus: Notophyson
- Species: N. buckleyi

Binomial name
- Notophyson buckleyi (H. Druce, 1895)

Synonyms
- Anthomyza buckleyi H. Druce, 1895

Species of moth

Notophyson buckleyi is a moth of the subfamily Arctiinae. It was described by Herbert Druce in 1895. It is found in Ecuador.
