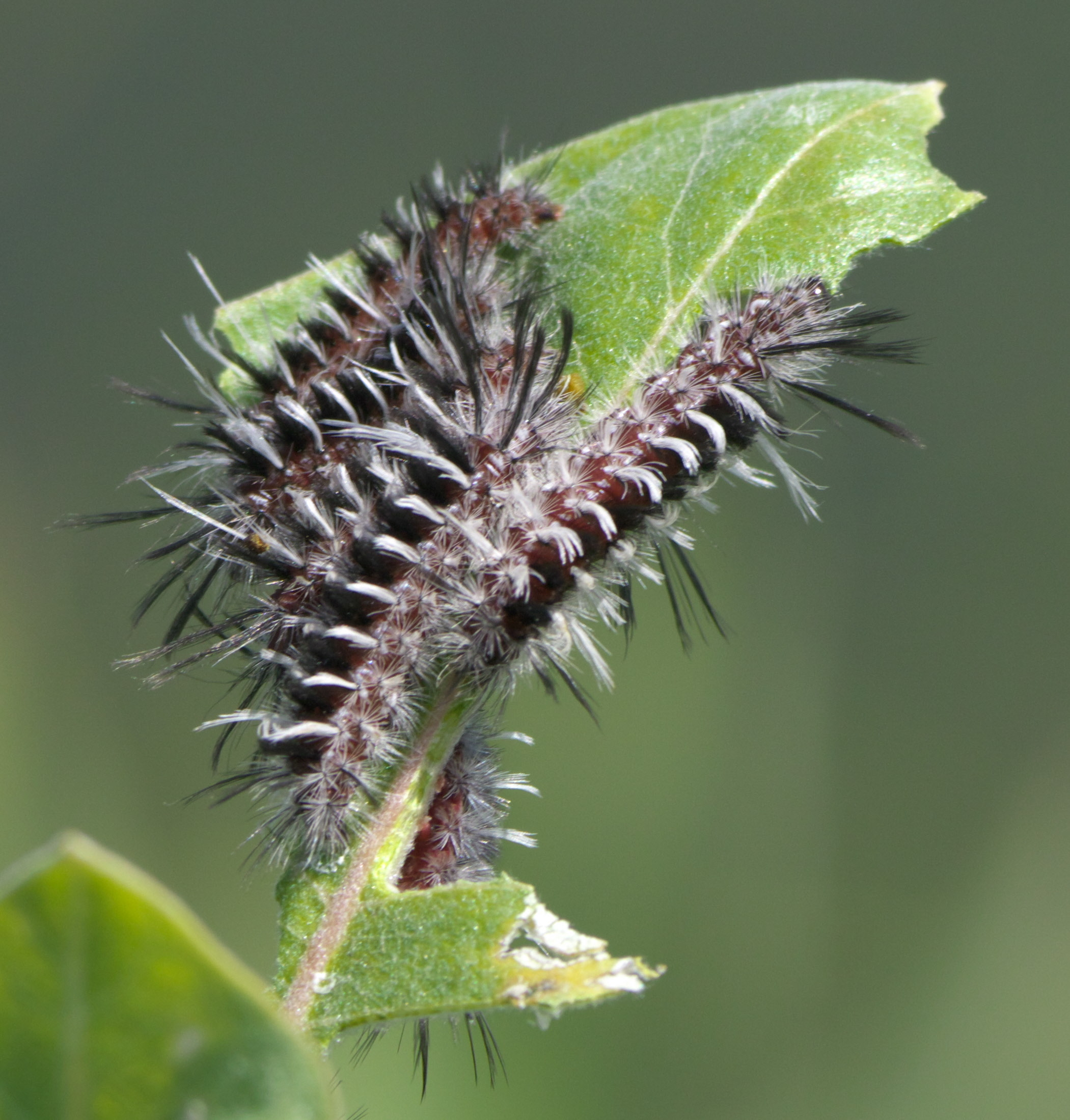

Scientific classification
- Kingdom: Animalia
- Phylum: Arthropoda
- Class: Insecta
- Order: Lepidoptera
- Superfamily: Noctuoidea
- Family: Erebidae
- Subfamily: Arctiinae
- Subtribe: Phaegopterina
- Genus: Pygoctenucha; Grote, 1883

Synonyms
- Protosia Hampson, 1900

= Pygoctenucha =

Genus of moths

Pygoctenucha is a genus of moths in the family Erebidae. The genus was erected by Augustus Radcliffe Grote in 1883.

== Species ==
- Pygoctenucha azteca (Schaus, 1892)
- Pygoctenucha clitus (Druce, 1884)
- Pygoctenucha enna (Druce, 1885)
- Pygoctenucha pyrrhoura (Hulst, 1881)
- Pygoctenucha terminalis (Walker, 1854)
