= Pseudophaloe tellinoides =

Scientific classification
- Domain: Eukaryota
- Kingdom: Animalia
- Phylum: Arthropoda
- Class: Insecta
- Order: Lepidoptera
- Superfamily: Noctuoidea
- Family: Erebidae
- Subfamily: Arctiinae
- Genus: Pseudophaloe
- Species: P. tellinoides

Binomial name
- Pseudophaloe tellinoides Hering, 1925

Species of moth

Pseudophaloe tellinoides is a moth in the family Erebidae. It was described by Hering in 1925. It is found in Ecuador.
