= Pseudophaloe isosoma =

Scientific classification
- Kingdom: Animalia
- Phylum: Arthropoda
- Clade: Pancrustacea
- Class: Insecta
- Order: Lepidoptera
- Superfamily: Noctuoidea
- Family: Erebidae
- Subfamily: Arctiinae
- Genus: Pseudophaloe
- Species: P. isosoma

Binomial name
- Pseudophaloe isosoma (Prout, 1920)

Synonyms
- Phaloe isosoma Prout, 1920

Species of moth

Pseudophaloe isosoma is a moth in the family Erebidae, found in Peru. The 5.6 cm-long female of the species was described by Prout in 1920.

This moth has a black and white spotted head, and brown- or black- and white stripes along the rest of its body. The wings are also black and white, but with a red stripe on the forewing.
