= Pygoctenucha pyrrhoura =

Scientific classification
- Domain: Eukaryota
- Kingdom: Animalia
- Phylum: Arthropoda
- Class: Insecta
- Order: Lepidoptera
- Superfamily: Noctuoidea
- Family: Erebidae
- Subfamily: Arctiinae
- Genus: Pygoctenucha
- Species: P. pyrrhoura

Binomial name
- Pygoctenucha pyrrhoura (Hulst, 1881)

Synonyms
- Ctenucha pyrrhoura Hulst, 1881

Species of moth

Pygoctenucha pyrrhoura is a moth in the family Erebidae. It was described by George Duryea Hulst in 1881. It is found in the US states of Texas and Colorado.

The wingspan is about 32 mm.
