= Syntomidopsis variegata =

Scientific classification
- Kingdom: Animalia
- Phylum: Arthropoda
- Clade: Pancrustacea
- Class: Insecta
- Order: Lepidoptera
- Superfamily: Noctuoidea
- Family: Erebidae
- Subfamily: Arctiinae
- Genus: Syntomidopsis
- Species: S. variegata

Binomial name
- Syntomidopsis variegata (Walker, 1854)

Synonyms
- Eudule variegata Walker, 1854

Species of moth

Syntomidopsis variegata is a moth in the subfamily Arctiinae. It was described by Francis Walker in 1854. It is found on Jamaica.
