= Heliactinidia tornensis =

Scientific classification
- Kingdom: Animalia
- Phylum: Arthropoda
- Clade: Pancrustacea
- Class: Insecta
- Order: Lepidoptera
- Superfamily: Noctuoidea
- Family: Erebidae
- Subfamily: Arctiinae
- Genus: Heliactinidia
- Species: H. tornensis

Binomial name
- Heliactinidia tornensis Prout, 1918

Species of moth

Heliactinidia tornensis is a moth of the subfamily Arctiinae. It was described by Prout in 1918. It is found in Colombia.

Here is Prout's original description:

Helactinidia tornensis.

male—30 mm.

Similar to chiguinda, Druce. Fore wing slightly more rounded, rather blacker brown; streak behind cell longer, crossing base of M2; outer band broader, not indented at posterior extremity of cell. Hind wing without the black costal area ; the streaks on submedian fold and in abdominal area wanting.

Torné, Cauca Valley, Colombia, August 1907. Type in coll. Joicey.
