= Sthenognatha flinti =

Scientific classification
- Domain: Eukaryota
- Kingdom: Animalia
- Phylum: Arthropoda
- Class: Insecta
- Order: Lepidoptera
- Superfamily: Noctuoidea
- Family: Erebidae
- Subfamily: Arctiinae
- Genus: Sthenognatha
- Species: S. flinti

Binomial name
- Sthenognatha flinti Todd, 1982

Species of moth

Sthenognatha flinti is a moth in the family Erebidae. It was described by Todd in 1982. It is found in the Dominican Republic.
