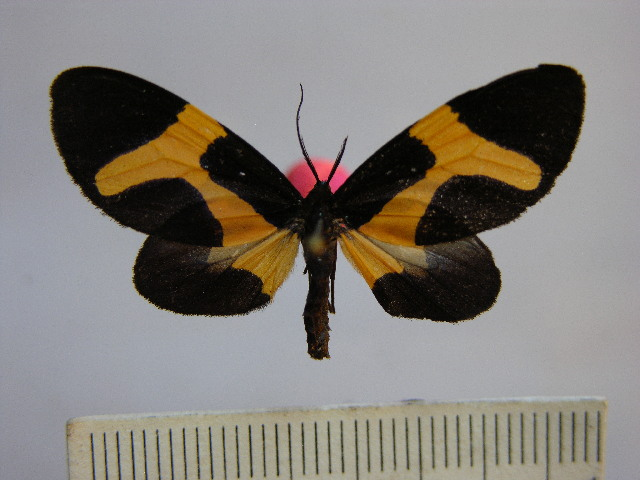

Scientific classification
- Kingdom: Animalia
- Phylum: Arthropoda
- Class: Insecta
- Order: Lepidoptera
- Superfamily: Noctuoidea
- Family: Erebidae
- Subfamily: Arctiinae
- Genus: Heliactinidia
- Species: H. caerulescens

Binomial name
- Heliactinidia caerulescens Hampson, 1901

Synonyms
- Didaphne caerulescens

= Heliactinidia caerulescens =

Species of moth

Heliactinidia caerulescens is a moth of the subfamily Arctiinae first described by George Hampson in 1901. It is found in Colombia.
