= Antiotricha furonia =

Scientific classification
- Domain: Eukaryota
- Kingdom: Animalia
- Phylum: Arthropoda
- Class: Insecta
- Order: Lepidoptera
- Superfamily: Noctuoidea
- Family: Erebidae
- Subfamily: Arctiinae
- Genus: Antiotricha
- Species: A. furonia

Binomial name
- Antiotricha furonia (H. Druce, 1911)

Synonyms
- Darna furonia H. Druce, 1911

Species of moth

Antiotricha furonia is a moth of the subfamily Arctiinae. It was described by Herbert Druce in 1911. It is found in Ecuador.
