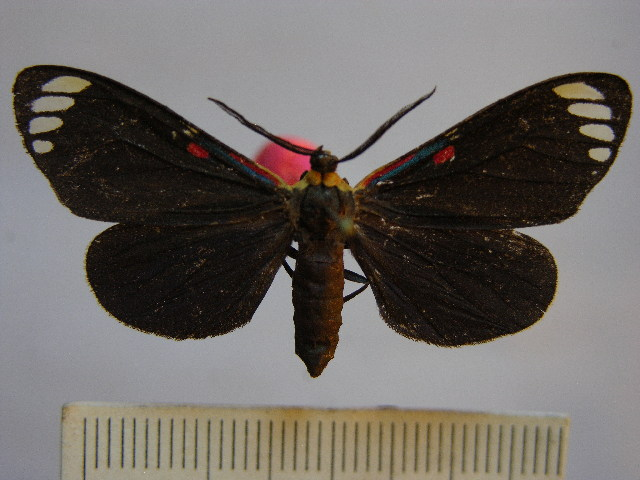

Scientific classification
- Kingdom: Animalia
- Phylum: Arthropoda
- Class: Insecta
- Order: Lepidoptera
- Superfamily: Noctuoidea
- Family: Erebidae
- Subfamily: Arctiinae
- Genus: Phaloesia; Walker, 1854
- Species: P. saucia

Binomial name
- Phaloesia saucia Walker, 1854

Synonyms
- Phaloesia fulvicollis Butler, 1876; Cocastra gentilis Boisduval, 1870; Phaloesia venezuelae Butler, 1876; Phaloesia chalybea Butler, 1876; Phaloesia flaviventris Reich, 1938

= Phaloesia =

Genus of moths

Phaloesia is a monotypic of tiger moth genus in the family Erebidae. Its only species is Phaloesia saucia, the saucy beauty moth. The genus and species were first described by Francis Walker in 1854. It is found from the lower Rio Grande Valley of Texas in the United States to Venezuela.

Adults are on wing nearly year round. Adults have been observed feeding on nectar from Chromolaena odorata, Aloysia gratissima and Sabal mexicana. The larvae feed on Tournefortia species, including Tournefortia volubilis.

== Taxonomy ==
Phaloesia fulvicollis was previously wrongly listed as a synonym of Gnophaela aequinoctialis.
