= Phaloe pyste =

Scientific classification
- Kingdom: Animalia
- Phylum: Arthropoda
- Clade: Pancrustacea
- Class: Insecta
- Order: Lepidoptera
- Superfamily: Noctuoidea
- Family: Erebidae
- Subfamily: Arctiinae
- Genus: Phaloe
- Species: P. pyste

Binomial name
- Phaloe pyste H. Druce, 1885

Species of moth

Phaloe pyste is a moth in the subfamily Arctiinae. It was described by Herbert Druce in 1885. It is found in Ecuador.
