= Phaloe vespertilio =

Scientific classification
- Kingdom: Animalia
- Phylum: Arthropoda
- Clade: Pancrustacea
- Class: Insecta
- Order: Lepidoptera
- Superfamily: Noctuoidea
- Family: Erebidae
- Subfamily: Arctiinae
- Genus: Phaloe
- Species: P. vespertilio

Binomial name
- Phaloe vespertilio Dognin, 1911

Species of moth

Phaloe vespertilio is a moth in the subfamily Arctiinae. It was described by Paul Dognin in 1911. It is found in Colombia.
