= Syntomidopsis =

Scientific classification
- Domain: Eukaryota
- Kingdom: Animalia
- Phylum: Arthropoda
- Class: Insecta
- Order: Lepidoptera
- Superfamily: Noctuoidea
- Family: Erebidae
- Subfamily: Arctiinae
- Subtribe: Pericopina
- Genus: Syntomidopsis; Hering, 1925

Synonyms
- Ira Neumoegen, 1890 (preocc. Walker, 1866); Cubira Watson, 1980

Genus of moths

Syntomidopsis is a genus of moths in the subfamily Arctiinae.

== Species ==
- Syntomidopsis gundlachiana Neumoegen, 1890
- Syntomidopsis variegata Walker, 1854
