= Ctenuchidia subcyanea =

Scientific classification
- Kingdom: Animalia
- Phylum: Arthropoda
- Class: Insecta
- Order: Lepidoptera
- Superfamily: Noctuoidea
- Family: Erebidae
- Subfamily: Arctiinae
- Genus: Ctenuchidia
- Species: C. subcyanea

Binomial name
- Ctenuchidia subcyanea (Walker, 1854)

Synonyms
- Mevania subcyanea Walker, 1854

Species of moth

Ctenuchidia subcyanea is a moth of the subfamily Arctiinae. It was described by Francis Walker in 1854. It is found on Hispaniola. The genus was erected by Augustus Radcliffe Grote in 1866.
