= Sagaropsis =

Scientific classification
- Domain: Eukaryota
- Kingdom: Animalia
- Phylum: Arthropoda
- Class: Insecta
- Order: Lepidoptera
- Superfamily: Noctuoidea
- Family: Erebidae
- Subfamily: Arctiinae
- Subtribe: Pericopina
- Genus: Sagaropsis; Hering, 1925

Genus of moths

Sagaropsis is a genus of tiger moths in the family Erebidae.

== Species ==
- Sagaropsis centralis Hering, 1925
- Sagaropsis brevifasciata Hering, 1925
- Sagaropsis elegans Hering, 1925
- Sagaropsis horae (Druce, 1885)
- Sagaropsis monotona Hering, 1925
- Sagaropsis rhombifera (Dognin, 1920)
- Sagaropsis tolimata (Dognin, 1918)
