= Ctenuchidia agrius =

Scientific classification
- Domain: Eukaryota
- Kingdom: Animalia
- Phylum: Arthropoda
- Class: Insecta
- Order: Lepidoptera
- Superfamily: Noctuoidea
- Family: Erebidae
- Subfamily: Arctiinae
- Genus: Ctenuchidia
- Species: C. agrius

Binomial name
- Ctenuchidia agrius (Fabricius, 1781)

Synonyms
- Zygaena agrius Fabricius, 1781

Species of moth

Ctenuchidia agrius is a moth of the subfamily Arctiinae. It was described by Johan Christian Fabricius in 1781. It is found in Suriname.
