= Euchlaenidia albilinea =

Scientific classification
- Domain: Eukaryota
- Kingdom: Animalia
- Phylum: Arthropoda
- Class: Insecta
- Order: Lepidoptera
- Superfamily: Noctuoidea
- Family: Erebidae
- Subfamily: Arctiinae
- Genus: Euchlaenidia
- Species: E. albilinea

Binomial name
- Euchlaenidia albilinea (Schaus, 1912)

Synonyms
- Polypoetes albilinea Schaus, 1912

Species of moth

Euchlaenidia albilinea is a moth of the family Erebidae first described by Schaus in 1912. It is found in Costa Rica.

== Taxonomy ==
The species was formerly included in the subfamily Dioptinae of the family Notodontidae.
