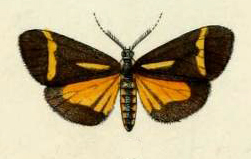

Scientific classification
- Domain: Eukaryota
- Kingdom: Animalia
- Phylum: Arthropoda
- Class: Insecta
- Order: Lepidoptera
- Superfamily: Noctuoidea
- Family: Erebidae
- Subfamily: Arctiinae
- Genus: Heliactinidia
- Species: H. chiguinda

Binomial name
- Heliactinidia chiguinda (H. Druce, 1885)

Synonyms
- Bepara chiguinda H. Druce, 1885

= Heliactinidia chiguinda =

Species of moth

Heliactinidia chiguinda is a moth of the subfamily Arctiinae. It was described by Herbert Druce in 1885. It is found in Colombia, Ecuador and Peru.
