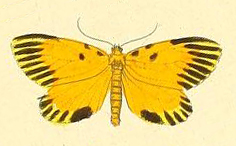
- Mesenochroa guatemalteca

Scientific classification
- Kingdom: Animalia
- Phylum: Arthropoda
- Clade: Pancrustacea
- Class: Insecta
- Order: Lepidoptera
- Superfamily: Noctuoidea
- Family: Erebidae
- Subfamily: Arctiinae
- Genus: Mesenochroa
- Species: M. guatemalteca

Binomial name
- Mesenochroa guatemalteca Felder, 1874

Synonyms
- Pyralopsis guatemalteca

= Mesenochroa guatemalteca =

Species of moth

Mesenochroa guatemalteca is a moth of the subfamily Arctiinae. It was described by Felder in 1874. It is found in Guatemala.
