= Phaloe ignita =

Scientific classification
- Kingdom: Animalia
- Phylum: Arthropoda
- Clade: Pancrustacea
- Class: Insecta
- Order: Lepidoptera
- Superfamily: Noctuoidea
- Family: Erebidae
- Subfamily: Arctiinae
- Genus: Phaloe
- Species: P. ignita

Binomial name
- Phaloe ignita (Butler, [1870])

Synonyms
- Pericopis ignita Butler, [1870]; Pericopis ignita Butler, 1870

Species of moth

Phaloe ignita is a moth in the subfamily Arctiinae. It was described by Arthur Gardiner Butler in 1870. It is found in Brazil.
