= Josiomorphoides dognini =

Scientific classification
- Kingdom: Animalia
- Phylum: Arthropoda
- Clade: Pancrustacea
- Class: Insecta
- Order: Lepidoptera
- Superfamily: Noctuoidea
- Family: Erebidae
- Subfamily: Arctiinae
- Genus: Josiomorphoides
- Species: J. dognini

Binomial name
- Josiomorphoides dognini Hering, 1925

Synonyms
- Josiomorpha flammata male var. cotype Dognin, 1909; Josiomophoides sp.? gigantea Watson & Goodge, 1986

Species of moth

Josiomorphoides dognini is a moth of the subfamily Arctiinae first described by Hering in 1925. It is found in Colombia.
