= Thyrgis =

Scientific classification
- Kingdom: Animalia
- Phylum: Arthropoda
- Class: Insecta
- Order: Lepidoptera
- Superfamily: Noctuoidea
- Family: Erebidae
- Subfamily: Arctiinae
- Subtribe: Pericopina
- Genus: Thyrgis; Walker, 1854

Genus of moths

Thyrgis is a genus of moths in the subfamily Arctiinae. The genus was erected by Francis Walker in 1854.

== Species ==
- Thyrgis angustifascia Hering, 1925
- Thyrgis basipunctata Hering, 1926
- Thyrgis childon (Druce, 1885)
- Thyrgis constrictifascia (Dognin, 1919)
- Thyrgis flavonigra Dognin, 1910
- Thyrgis lacryma Dognin, 1919
- Thyrgis marginata (Butler, 1876)
- Thyrgis militta (Stoll, [1781])
- Thyrgis ruscia (Druce, 1895)
- Thyrgis tenuifascia Hering, 1930
