= Episcea sancta =

Scientific classification
- Domain: Eukaryota
- Kingdom: Animalia
- Phylum: Arthropoda
- Class: Insecta
- Order: Lepidoptera
- Superfamily: Noctuoidea
- Family: Erebidae
- Subfamily: Arctiinae
- Genus: Episcea
- Species: E. sancta

Binomial name
- Episcea sancta Warren, 1901

Species of moth

Episcea sancta is a moth of the family Erebidae. It was described by Warren in 1901. It is found in Brazil.
