= Thyrgis tenuifascia =

Scientific classification
- Kingdom: Animalia
- Phylum: Arthropoda
- Clade: Pancrustacea
- Class: Insecta
- Order: Lepidoptera
- Superfamily: Noctuoidea
- Family: Erebidae
- Subfamily: Arctiinae
- Genus: Thyrgis
- Species: T. tenuifascia

Binomial name
- Thyrgis tenuifascia Hering, 1930

Synonyms
- Thyrgis daguana Hering, 1930

Species of moth

Thyrgis tenuifascia is a moth in the subfamily Arctiinae. It was described by Hering in 1930. It is found in Colombia.

== Subspecies ==
- Thyrgis tenuifascia tenuifascia
- Thyrgis tenuifascia daguana Hering, 1930
