= Thyrgis lacryma =

Scientific classification
- Kingdom: Animalia
- Phylum: Arthropoda
- Clade: Pancrustacea
- Class: Insecta
- Order: Lepidoptera
- Superfamily: Noctuoidea
- Family: Erebidae
- Subfamily: Arctiinae
- Genus: Thyrgis
- Species: T. lacryma

Binomial name
- Thyrgis lacryma Dognin, 1919

Species of moth

Thyrgis lacryma is a moth in the subfamily Arctiinae. It was described by Paul Dognin in 1919. It is found in French Guiana.
