= Pygoctenucha azteca =

Scientific classification
- Domain: Eukaryota
- Kingdom: Animalia
- Phylum: Arthropoda
- Class: Insecta
- Order: Lepidoptera
- Superfamily: Noctuoidea
- Family: Erebidae
- Subfamily: Arctiinae
- Genus: Pygoctenucha
- Species: P. azteca

Binomial name
- Pygoctenucha azteca (Schaus, 1892)

Synonyms
- Ctenucha azteca Schaus, 1892

Species of moth

Pygoctenucha azteca is a moth in the family Erebidae. It was described by William Schaus in 1892. It is found in Mexico.
