= Sthenognatha gentilis =

Scientific classification
- Domain: Eukaryota
- Kingdom: Animalia
- Phylum: Arthropoda
- Class: Insecta
- Order: Lepidoptera
- Superfamily: Noctuoidea
- Family: Erebidae
- Subfamily: Arctiinae
- Genus: Sthenognatha
- Species: S. gentilis

Binomial name
- Sthenognatha gentilis Felder & Rogenhofer, 1874

Synonyms
- Sthenognatha pyrophora Hering, 1926

Species of moth

Sthenognatha gentilis is a moth in the family Erebidae. It was described by Felder and Rogenhofer in 1874. It is found in Brazil.
