= Gnophaela clappiana =

Scientific classification
- Domain: Eukaryota
- Kingdom: Animalia
- Phylum: Arthropoda
- Class: Insecta
- Order: Lepidoptera
- Superfamily: Noctuoidea
- Family: Erebidae
- Subfamily: Arctiinae
- Genus: Gnophaela
- Species: G. clappiana

Binomial name
- Gnophaela clappiana Holland, 1891

Synonyms
- Gnophaela clappiana f. ruidosensis Cockerell, 1904

Species of moth

Gnophaela clappiana is a moth of the family Erebidae. It was described by William Jacob Holland in 1891. It is found in the United States from Arizona and New Mexico to Colorado.
