= Pygoctenucha enna =

Scientific classification
- Domain: Eukaryota
- Kingdom: Animalia
- Phylum: Arthropoda
- Class: Insecta
- Order: Lepidoptera
- Superfamily: Noctuoidea
- Family: Erebidae
- Subfamily: Arctiinae
- Genus: Pygoctenucha
- Species: P. enna

Binomial name
- Pygoctenucha enna (H. Druce, 1885)

Synonyms
- Apistosia enna H. Druce, 1885

Species of moth

Pygoctenucha enna is a moth in the subfamily Arctiinae. It was described by Herbert Druce in 1885. It is found in Mexico.
