= Pseudophaloe cerealia =

Scientific classification
- Domain: Eukaryota
- Kingdom: Animalia
- Phylum: Arthropoda
- Class: Insecta
- Order: Lepidoptera
- Superfamily: Noctuoidea
- Family: Erebidae
- Subfamily: Arctiinae
- Genus: Pseudophaloe
- Species: P. cerealia

Binomial name
- Pseudophaloe cerealia (H. Druce, 1884)

Synonyms
- Phaloe cerealia H. Druce, 1884

Species of moth

Pseudophaloe cerealia is a moth in the family Erebidae. It was described by Herbert Druce in 1884. It is found in Panama.
