= Pseudophaloe schausii =

Scientific classification
- Domain: Eukaryota
- Kingdom: Animalia
- Phylum: Arthropoda
- Class: Insecta
- Order: Lepidoptera
- Superfamily: Noctuoidea
- Family: Erebidae
- Subfamily: Arctiinae
- Genus: Pseudophaloe
- Species: P. schausii

Binomial name
- Pseudophaloe schausii (H. Edwards, 1884)

Synonyms
- Pericopis schausii H. Edwards, 1884; Pseudophaloe schausi; Pericopis schausi; Phaloe verania Druce, 1884; Pseudophaloe verania; Pseudophaloe veranioides Hering, 1925

Species of moth

Pseudophaloe schausii is a moth of the family Erebidae first described by Henry Edwards in 1884. It is found in Mexico and Guatemala.
