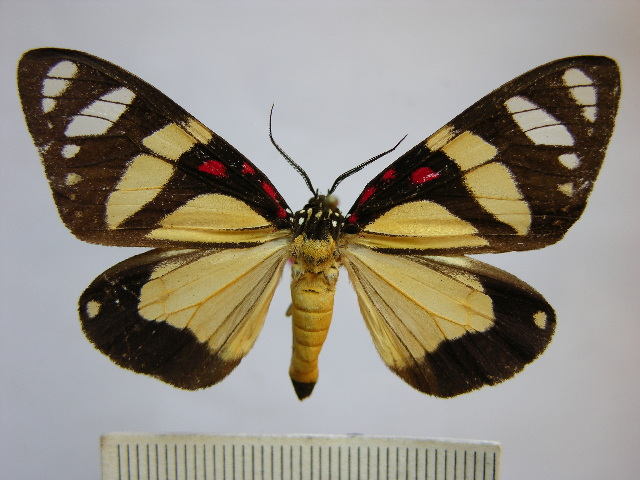

Scientific classification
- Kingdom: Animalia
- Phylum: Arthropoda
- Clade: Pancrustacea
- Class: Insecta
- Order: Lepidoptera
- Superfamily: Noctuoidea
- Family: Erebidae
- Subfamily: Arctiinae
- Genus: Phaloe
- Species: P. cubana

Binomial name
- Phaloe cubana (Herrich-Schäffer, 1866)

Synonyms
- Pericopis cubana Herrich-Schäffer, 1866; Sphaeromachia cubana; Phaloe gaumeri Druce, 1884; Dysschema gaumeri; Sphaeromachia gaumeri

= Phaloe cubana =

Species of moth

Phaloe cubana is a species of moth in the subfamily Arctiinae first described by Gottlieb August Wilhelm Herrich-Schäffer in 1866. It is found in Central America (including Guatemala and Belize), Mexico and Cuba.
