= Sthenognatha cinda =

Scientific classification
- Kingdom: Animalia
- Phylum: Arthropoda
- Class: Insecta
- Order: Lepidoptera
- Superfamily: Noctuoidea
- Family: Erebidae
- Subfamily: Arctiinae
- Genus: Sthenognatha
- Species: S. cinda

Binomial name
- Sthenognatha cinda (Schaus, 1938)

Synonyms
- Hyalurga cinda Schaus, 1938

Species of moth

Sthenognatha cinda is a moth in the family Erebidae. It was described by William Schaus in 1938. It is found on Cuba.
