= Scearctia =

Scientific classification
- Domain: Eukaryota
- Kingdom: Animalia
- Phylum: Arthropoda
- Class: Insecta
- Order: Lepidoptera
- Superfamily: Noctuoidea
- Family: Erebidae
- Subfamily: Arctiinae
- Genus: Scearctia; Hering, 1925
- Species: S. figulina

Binomial name
- Scearctia figulina (Butler, 1877)

Synonyms
- Gangamela figulina Butler, 1877

Genus of moths

Scearctia is a monotypic moth genus in the subfamily Arctiinae described by Hering in 1925. Its single species, Scearctia figulina, first described by Arthur Gardiner Butler in 1877, is found in Brazil.
