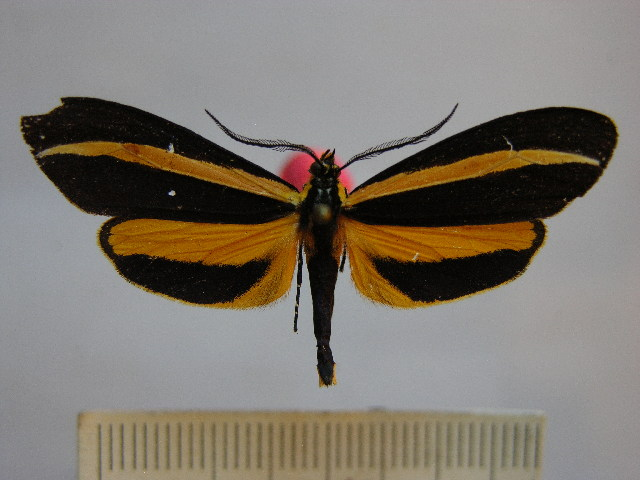
- Josiomorpha penetrata

Scientific classification
- Domain: Eukaryota
- Kingdom: Animalia
- Phylum: Arthropoda
- Class: Insecta
- Order: Lepidoptera
- Superfamily: Noctuoidea
- Family: Erebidae
- Subfamily: Arctiinae
- Genus: Josiomorpha; Felder, 1874

= Josiomorpha =

Genus of moths

Josiomorpha is a genus of moths in the subfamily Arctiinae described by Felder in 1874.

== Species ==
- Josiomorpha cathetozosta Becker, 2013
- Josiomorpha penetrata (Walker, [1865])
- Josiomorpha triangulifera Hering, 1925
