= Gnophaela aequinoctialis =

Scientific classification
- Kingdom: Animalia
- Phylum: Arthropoda
- Class: Insecta
- Order: Lepidoptera
- Superfamily: Noctuoidea
- Family: Erebidae
- Subfamily: Arctiinae
- Genus: Gnophaela
- Species: G. aequinoctialis

Binomial name
- Gnophaela aequinoctialis (Walker, 1854)

Synonyms
- Dioptis aequinoctialis Walker, 1854; Gnophaela disjuncta H. Edwards, 1885

Species of moth

Gnophaela aequinoctialis is a moth of the family Erebidae. It was first described by Francis Walker in 1854 and is found in Texas, Mexico, Nicaragua and Venezuela.

The wingspan is approximately 48 mm.
