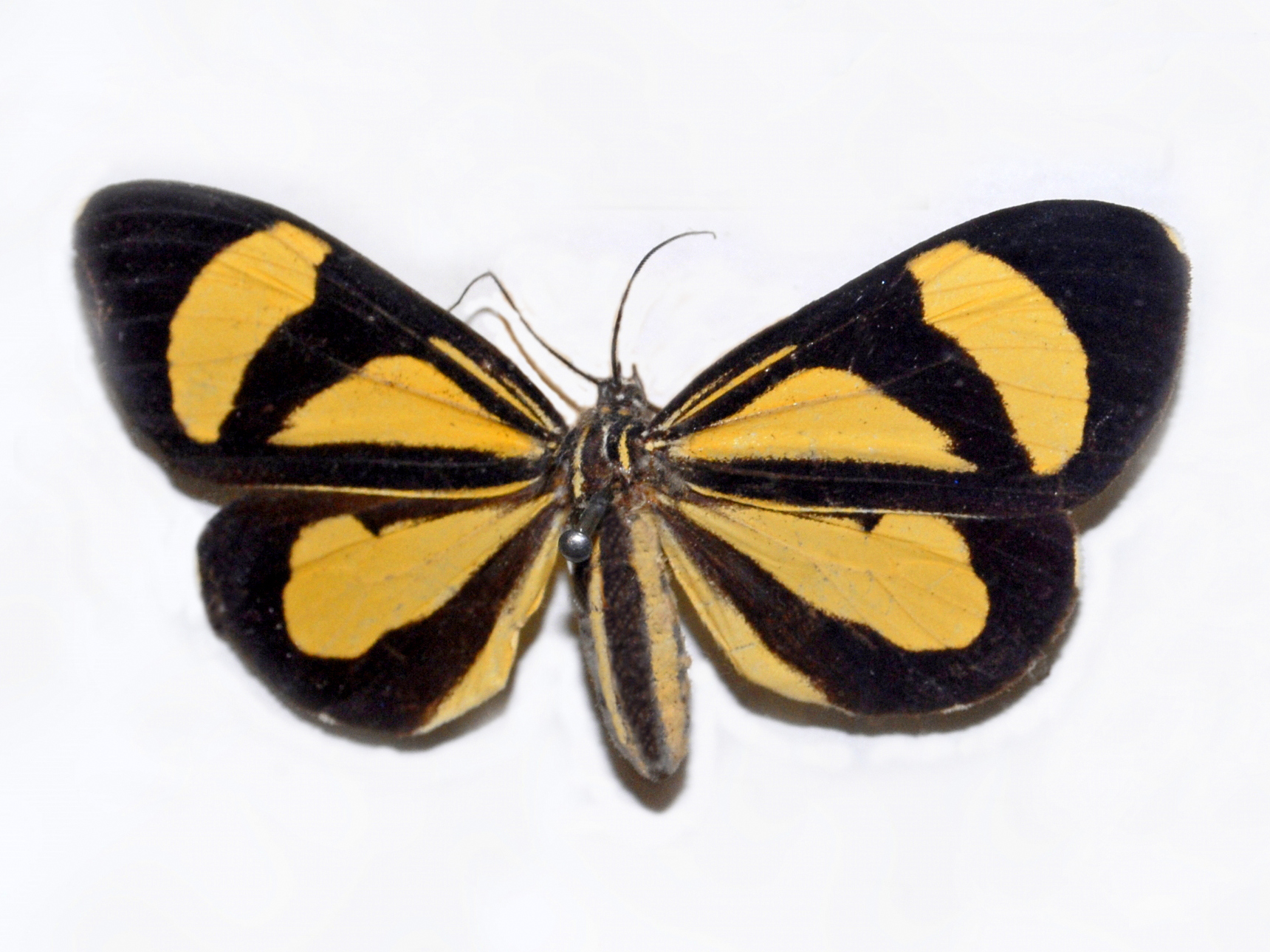
- Mounted specimen on display at the Museo Civico di Storia Naturale di Trieste

Scientific classification
- Kingdom: Animalia
- Phylum: Arthropoda
- Clade: Pancrustacea
- Class: Insecta
- Order: Lepidoptera
- Superfamily: Noctuoidea
- Family: Erebidae
- Subfamily: Arctiinae
- Genus: Ephestris; Hübner, [1820]
- Species: E. melaxantha

Binomial name
- Ephestris melaxantha (Hübner, [1809])

Synonyms
- Generic: Lama Walker, 1869 (preocc. Cuvier, 1800); Specific: Hypocrita melaxantha Hübner, [1809]; Hypocrita superba Hübner, [1809]

= Ephestris =

Genus of moths

Ephestris is a monotypic tiger moth genus in the family Erebidae. It contains the single species Ephestris melaxantha. Both the genus and species were first described by Jacob Hübner, the genus in 1820 and the species in 1809.

== Etymology ==
The specific name melaxantha derives from the Greek μελανός (melanós) meaning "black" and xanthus, meaning "golden haired" or "yellow", with reference to the striking coloration of the wings, probably a warning to predators.

== Description ==
Ephestris melaxantha has a wingspan of about 70 millimetres (2.8 in). Despite being a moth, it has diurnal behavior.

== Distribution ==
This species is native to Brazil and the tropical regions of South America.
