= Antiotricha =

Scientific classification
- Domain: Eukaryota
- Kingdom: Animalia
- Phylum: Arthropoda
- Class: Insecta
- Order: Lepidoptera
- Superfamily: Noctuoidea
- Family: Erebidae
- Subfamily: Arctiinae
- Tribe: Arctiini
- Genus: Antiotricha; Felder, 1874

Genus of moths

Antiotricha is a genus of moths in the subfamily Arctiinae. The genus was described by Felder in 1874.

== Species ==
- Antiotricha cecata Dognin, 1900
- Antiotricha directa Dognin, 1924
- Antiotricha districta Walker, 1865
- Antiotricha furonia H. Druce, 1911
- Antiotricha integra Walker, 1865
- Antiotricha pluricincta Dognin, 1918
