= Pygoctenucha clitus =

Scientific classification
- Domain: Eukaryota
- Kingdom: Animalia
- Phylum: Arthropoda
- Class: Insecta
- Order: Lepidoptera
- Superfamily: Noctuoidea
- Family: Erebidae
- Subfamily: Arctiinae
- Genus: Pygoctenucha
- Species: P. clitus

Binomial name
- Pygoctenucha clitus (H. Druce, 1884)

Synonyms
- Elysius clitus H. Druce, 1884; Pteroodes clitus (H. Druce, 1884)

Species of moth

Pygoctenucha clitus is a moth in the subfamily Arctiinae. It was described by Herbert Druce in 1884. It is found in Costa Rica.
