= Gnophaela discreta =

Scientific classification
- Domain: Eukaryota
- Kingdom: Animalia
- Phylum: Arthropoda
- Class: Insecta
- Order: Lepidoptera
- Superfamily: Noctuoidea
- Family: Erebidae
- Subfamily: Arctiinae
- Genus: Gnophaela
- Species: G. discreta

Binomial name
- Gnophaela discreta Stretch, 1875

Synonyms
- Gnophaela discreta Stretch, 1875; Gnophaela arizona French, 1884; Gnophaela morrisoni Druce, 1885; Gonophaela morrisoni Druce, 1885

Species of moth

Gnophaela discreta is a moth of the family Erebidae. It was described by Stretch in 1875. It is found in Mexico, Arizona and California.

The wingspan is about 38 mm.

The larvae feed on Mertensia species.
