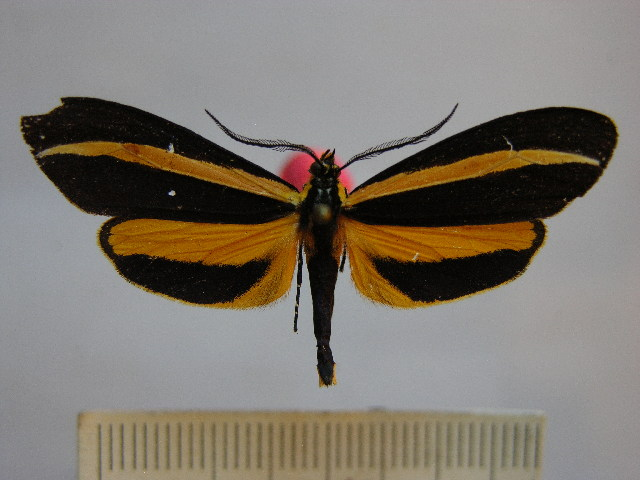

Scientific classification
- Kingdom: Animalia
- Phylum: Arthropoda
- Clade: Pancrustacea
- Class: Insecta
- Order: Lepidoptera
- Superfamily: Noctuoidea
- Family: Erebidae
- Subfamily: Arctiinae
- Genus: Josiomorpha
- Species: J. penetrata

Binomial name
- Josiomorpha penetrata (Walker, [1865])

Synonyms
- Josia penetrata Walker, [1865]; Josiomorpha longivitta Felder, 1874

= Josiomorpha penetrata =

Species of moth

Josiomorpha penetrata is a moth of the subfamily Arctiinae first described by Francis Walker in 1865. It is found from southern Mexico to Guatemala.
