= Seileria =

Scientific classification
- Domain: Eukaryota
- Kingdom: Animalia
- Phylum: Arthropoda
- Class: Insecta
- Order: Lepidoptera
- Superfamily: Noctuoidea
- Family: Erebidae
- Subfamily: Arctiinae
- Genus: Seileria; Dognin, 1923
- Species: S. eucyaniformis

Binomial name
- Seileria eucyaniformis Dognin, 1923

Genus of moths

Seileria is a monotypic moth genus in the subfamily Arctiinae. Its single species, Seileria eucyaniformis, is found in Colombia. Both the genus and species were first described by Paul Dognin in 1923.
