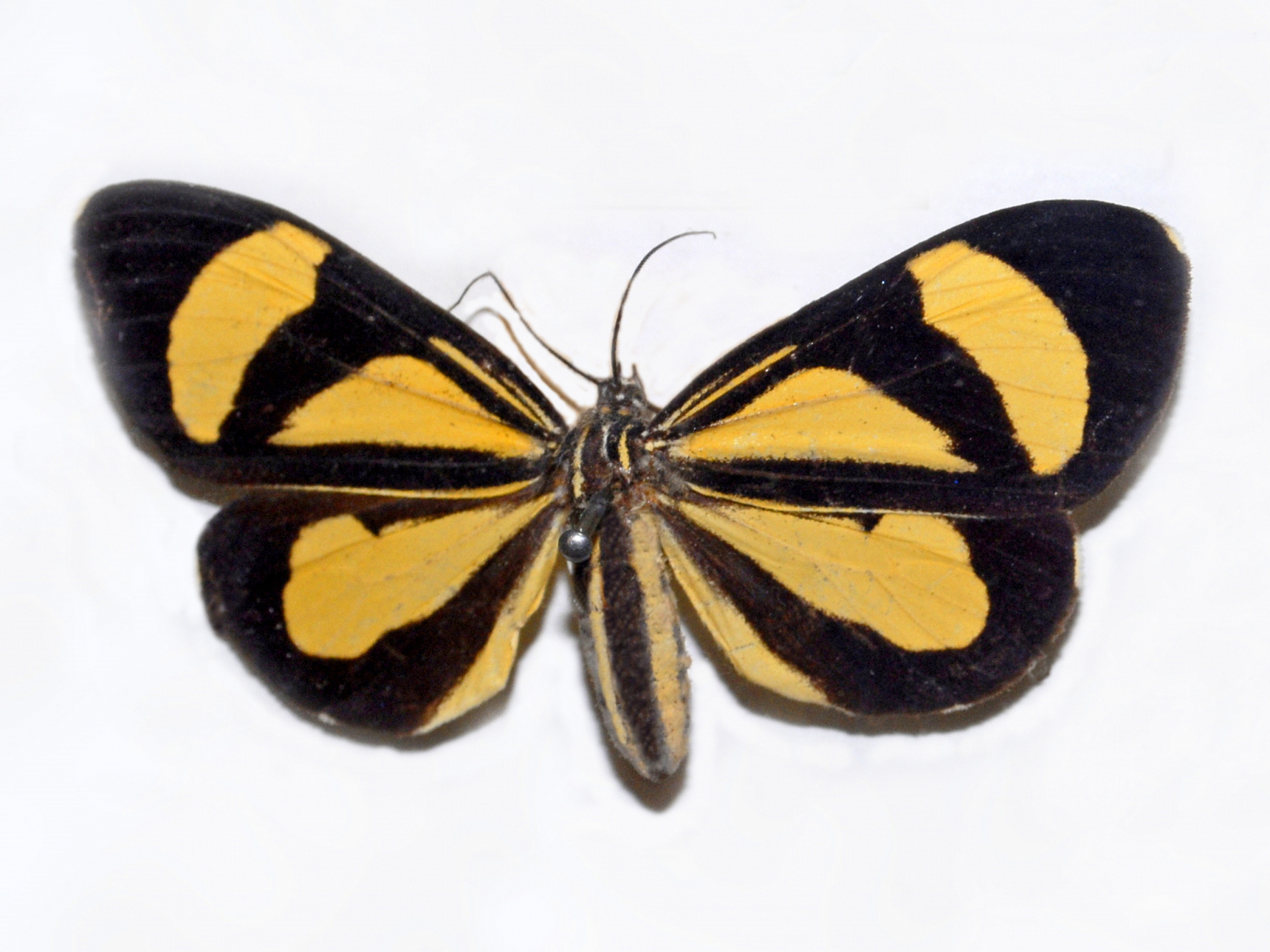
- Ephestris melaxantha

Scientific classification
- Kingdom: Animalia
- Phylum: Arthropoda
- Class: Insecta
- Order: Lepidoptera
- Superfamily: Noctuoidea
- Family: Erebidae
- Subfamily: Arctiinae
- Tribe: Arctiini
- Subtribe: Pericopina; Walker, 1869

= Pericopina =

List of subtribe of insects

The Pericopina is a subtribe of tiger moths in the family Erebidae. The subtribe was described by Francis Walker in 1869.

== Taxonomy ==
The subtribe was previously classified as the subfamily Pericopinae of the family Arctiidae.

== Selected genera ==
The following genera are included in the subtribe.

- Antiotricha
- Are
- Calodesma
- Chetone
- Composia
- Crocomela
- Ctenuchidia
- Cyanarctia
- Didaphne
- Dysschema
- Ephestris
- Episcea
- Euchlaenidia
- Eucyanoides
- Gnophaela
- Heliactinidia
- Hyalurga
- Hypocrita
- Isostola
- Josiomorpha
- Josiomorphoides
- Mesenochroa
- Myserla
- Notophyson
- Phaloe
- Phaloesia
- Pseudophaloe
- Pteroodes
- Sagaropsis
- Scearctia
- Seileria
- Sthenognatha
- Syntomidopsis
- Thermidarctia
- Thyrgis
- Xenosoma
