= Mimudea =

Scientific classification
- Domain: Eukaryota
- Kingdom: Animalia
- Phylum: Arthropoda
- Class: Insecta
- Order: Lepidoptera
- Family: Crambidae
- Subfamily: Spilomelinae
- Genus: Mimudea; Warren, 1892

Genus of moths

Mimudea is a genus of moths of the family Crambidae described by William Warren in 1892.

== Species ==
- Mimudea aenealis (Hampson, 1913)
- Mimudea albiflua (Hampson, 1913)
- Mimudea albiluna (Hampson, 1913)
- Mimudea brevialis Walker, 1859
- Mimudea brunnealis Dognin, 1912
- Mimudea brunneicilialis (Hampson, 1913)
- Mimudea bryophilalis (Hampson, 1903)
- Mimudea chalcitalis (Hampson, 1913)
- Mimudea chalcochlora (Hampson, 1916)
- Mimudea dichorda (Hampson, 1913)
- Mimudea distictalis (Hampson, 1913)
- Mimudea distictalis (Hampson, 1918)
- Mimudea dithyralis Dognin, 1910
- Mimudea ectophaealis (Hampson, 1913)
- Mimudea flavinotata Warren, 1892
- Mimudea fracidalis (E. Hering, 1901)
- Mimudea fuscizonalis (Hampson, 1896)
- Mimudea haematalis (Hampson, 1913)
- Mimudea hyalopunctalis Dognin, 1912
- Mimudea ignitalis (Hampson, 1913)
- Mimudea impuralis (Snellen, 1875)
- Mimudea lividalis Dognin, 1905
- Mimudea longipalpalis (Hampson, 1903)
- Mimudea mendicalis (South in Leech & South, 1901)
- Mimudea obfuscalis (Dognin, 1905)
- Mimudea obvialis (Hampson, 1913)
- Mimudea octonalis (Snellen, 1890)
- Mimudea olivalis Warren, 1892
- Mimudea pallidalis (South in Leech & South, 1901)
- Mimudea pectinalis (Hampson, 1913)
- Mimudea permixtalis (Walker, 1865)
- Mimudea phoenicistis (Hampson, 1896)
- Mimudea poliosticta (Hampson, 1903)
- Mimudea praepandalis (Snellen, 1890)
- Mimudea punctiferalis (South in Leech & South, 1901)
- Mimudea rocinalis (Dognin, 1897)
- Mimudea selenographa (Meyrick, 1936)
- Mimudea sthennymalis (Dyar, 1914)
- Mimudea subochracealis (Pagenstecher, 1884)
- Mimudea tisiasalis (Druce, 1899)
- Mimudea trilampas Dognin, 1912
- Mimudea tristigmalis (Hampson, 1918)

== Former species ==
- Mimudea bractealis (Kenrick, 1907)
- Mimudea quadrimaculalis Dognin, 1908
- Mimudea squamosa (Hampson, 1913)
