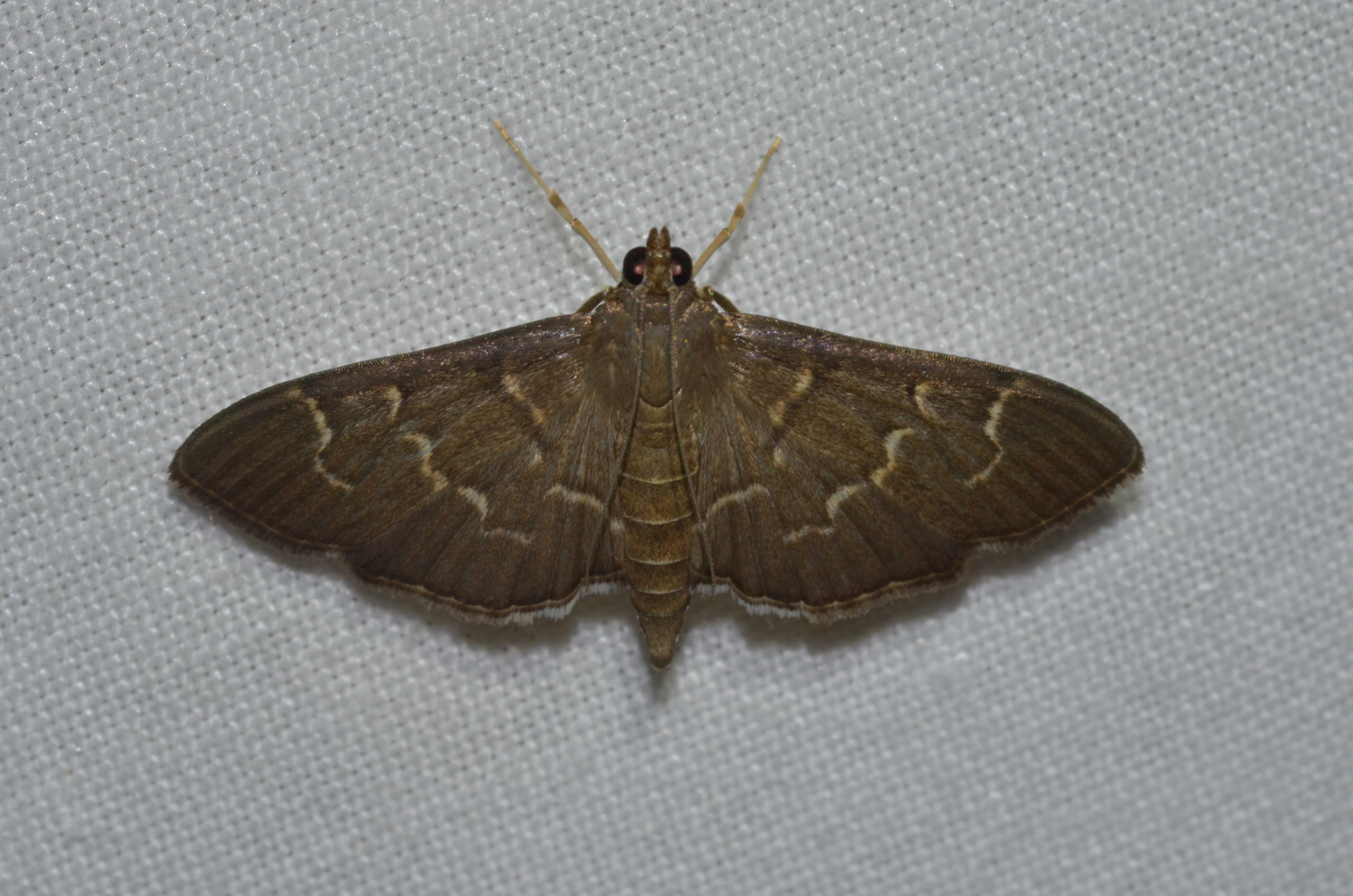
- Pilocrocis ramentalis

Scientific classification
- Kingdom: Animalia
- Phylum: Arthropoda
- Clade: Pancrustacea
- Class: Insecta
- Order: Lepidoptera
- Family: Crambidae
- Tribe: Herpetogrammatini
- Genus: Pilocrocis; Lederer, 1863

Synonyms
- Anisoctena Meyrick, 1894; Pilocrosis Janse, 1917

= Pilocrocis =

Genus of moths

Pilocrocis is a genus of moths of the family Crambidae. The genus was first erected by Julius Lederer in 1863.

== Species ==
The following species are recognised in the genus Pilocrocis:

- Pilocrocis acutangula Hampson, 1899
- Pilocrocis angulifera Kenrick, 1912
- Pilocrocis anigrusalis (Walker, 1859)
- Pilocrocis bastalis Schaus, 1920
- Pilocrocis buckleyi (Druce, 1895)
- Pilocrocis calamistis Hampson, 1899
- Pilocrocis caustichroalis Hampson, 1918
- Pilocrocis confixalis (Walker, 1866)
- Pilocrocis coptobasis Hampson, 1899
- Pilocrocis cryptalis (Druce, 1895)
- Pilocrocis cuprealis Hampson, 1912
- Pilocrocis cuprescens Hampson, 1917
- Pilocrocis cyranonalis Schaus, 1920
- Pilocrocis cyrisalis (Druce, 1895)
- Pilocrocis deltalis Viette, 1958
- Pilocrocis dentilinealis Schaus, 1920
- Pilocrocis dichocrosialis Hampson, 1912
- Pilocrocis dithyralis Hampson, 1912
- Pilocrocis dohrnialis E. Hering, 1901
- Pilocrocis evanidalis Schaus, 1920
- Pilocrocis fanovalis Viette, 1958
- Pilocrocis flagellalis Dognin, 1909
- Pilocrocis flavicorpus Hampson, 1917
- Pilocrocis floccosa (E. Hering, 1901)
- Pilocrocis fulviflavalis Hampson, 1917
- Pilocrocis fumidalis Hampson, 1912
- Pilocrocis gillippusalis (Walker, 1859)
- Pilocrocis glaucitalis Hampson, 1912
- Pilocrocis granjae F. Hoffmann, 1934
- Pilocrocis guianalis Schaus, 1920
- Pilocrocis hypoleucalis Hampson, 1912
- Pilocrocis isozona (Meyrick, 1936)
- Pilocrocis italavalis Viette, 1958
- Pilocrocis janinalis Viette, 1958
- Pilocrocis lactealis Hampson, 1912
- Pilocrocis laralis Hampson, 1909
- Pilocrocis latifuscalis Hampson, 1899
- Pilocrocis melangnatha Hampson, 1912
- Pilocrocis melastictalis Hampson, 1912
- Pilocrocis metachrysias Hampson, 1918
- Pilocrocis milvinalis (Swinhoe, 1885)
- Pilocrocis modestalis Schaus, 1912
- Pilocrocis monothyralis Hampson, 1912
- Pilocrocis musalis Schaus, 1912
- Pilocrocis nubilinea Bethune-Baker, 1909
- Pilocrocis pachyceralis Hampson, 1917
- Pilocrocis patagialis Hampson, 1909
- Pilocrocis phaeocoryla Ghesquière, 1942
- Pilocrocis plicatalis Hampson, 1912
- Pilocrocis polialis Schaus, 1927
- Pilocrocis pterygodia Hampson, 1912
- Pilocrocis purpurascens Hampson, 1899
- Pilocrocis ramentalis Lederer, 1863
- Pilocrocis rectilinealis (Kenrick, 1917)
- Pilocrocis reniferalis Hampson, 1912
- Pilocrocis rooalis (Snellen, 1875)
- Pilocrocis roxonalis (Druce, 1895)
- Pilocrocis runatalis Dyar, 1914
- Pilocrocis sororalis Schaus, 1920
- Pilocrocis synomotis (Meyrick, 1894)
- Pilocrocis xanthostictalis Hampson, 1908
- Pilocrocis xanthozonalis Hampson, 1912

== Former species ==
- Pilocrocis ingeminata Meyrick, 1933
