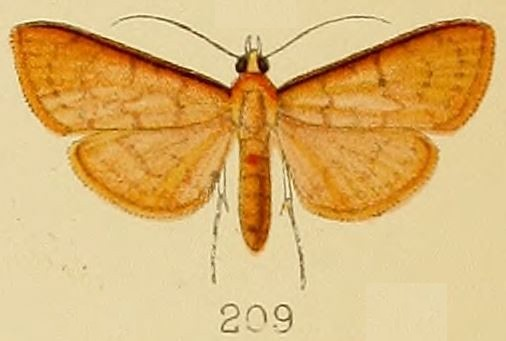
- Psara rubricostalis

Scientific classification
- Kingdom: Animalia
- Phylum: Arthropoda
- Class: Insecta
- Order: Lepidoptera
- Family: Crambidae
- Tribe: Asciodini
- Genus: Psara; Snellen, 1875

Synonyms
- Epichronistis Meyrick, 1886

= Psara (moth) =

Genus of moths

Psara is a genus of moths in the family Crambidae described by Snellen in 1875.

== Species ==
- Psara acrospila (Meyrick, 1886)
- Psara admensalis (Walker, 1859)
- Psara aprepia (Hampson, 1913)
- Psara atritermina (Hampson, 1913)
- Psara chathamalis (Schaus, 1923)
- Psara cryptolepis (E. L. Martin, 1956)
- Psara dorcalis (Guenée, 1862)
- Psara dryalis (Walker, 1859)
- Psara ferruginalis (Saalmüller, 1880)
- Psara frenettalis Legrand, 1966
- Psara glaucalis (Hampson, 1912)
- Psara guatalis Schaus, 1920
- Psara hesperialis (Herrich-Schäffer, 1871)
- Psara ingeminata (Meyrick, 1933)
- Psara intermedialis (Amsel, 1956)
- Psara jasiusalis (Walker, 1859)
- Psara molestalis (Amsel, 1956)
- Psara mysticalis (Schaus, 1920)
- Psara nigridior Rothschild, 1915
- Psara normalis Hampson, 1918
- Psara obscuralis (Lederer, 1863)
- Psara orphnopeza J. F. G. Clarke, 1986
- Psara pallicaudalis Snellen, 1875
- Psara palpalis Hampson, 1918
- Psara pargialis (Schaus, 1920)
- Psara pertentalis (Möschler, 1890)
- Psara prumnides (Druce, 1895)
- Psara rubricostalis Janse, 1924
- Psara selenialis Snellen, 1895
- Psara simillima (Hampson, 1913)
- Psara subaurantialis (Herrich-Schäffer, 1871)
- Psara subhyalinalis (Herrich-Schäffer, 1871)
- Psara submarginalis Caradja, 1925
- Psara ultratrinalis (Marion, 1954)
- Psara venezuelensis (Amsel, 1956)

=== Former species ===
- Psara mahensis (T. B. Fletcher, 1910) transferred to Zebronia mahensis (T. B. Fletcher, 1910)
- Psara pallidalis Hampson, 1913 transferred to Herpetogramma pallidalis (Hampson, 1913)
- Psara subnitalis Schaus, 1920 transferred to Herpetogramma subnitens (Schaus, 1920)
