= Hapalia distictalis =

Mimudea distictalis

Scientific classification
- Kingdom: Animalia
- Phylum: Arthropoda
- Class: Insecta
- Order: Lepidoptera
- Family: Crambidae
- Genus: Mimudea
- Species: M. distictalis

Binomial name
- Mimudea distictalis (Hampson, 1918)

Synonyms
- Hapalia distictalis Hampson, 1918

Species of moth

Mimudea distictalis is a moth in the family Crambidae. It was described by George Hampson in 1918. It is found in Colombia.

== Taxonomy ==
The species name is preoccupied by Mimudea distictalis, also described by Hampson, but in 1913.
