= Psara prumnides =

Scientific classification
- Kingdom: Animalia
- Phylum: Arthropoda
- Class: Insecta
- Order: Lepidoptera
- Family: Crambidae
- Genus: Psara
- Species: P. prumnides

Binomial name
- Psara prumnides (H. Druce, 1895)

Synonyms
- Epicorsia prumnides H. Druce, 1895

Species of moth

Psara prumnides is a species of moth in the family Crambidae. It was described by Herbert Druce in 1895. It is found in Mexico (Veracruz, Guerrero), Costa Rica, Honduras and Panama.

== Description ==
The forewings are black, but orange yellow from the base to beyond the middle. The hindwings are orange yellow, the apex, outer margin and anal angle broadly bordered with black, and with several black spots along the costal and inner margins.
