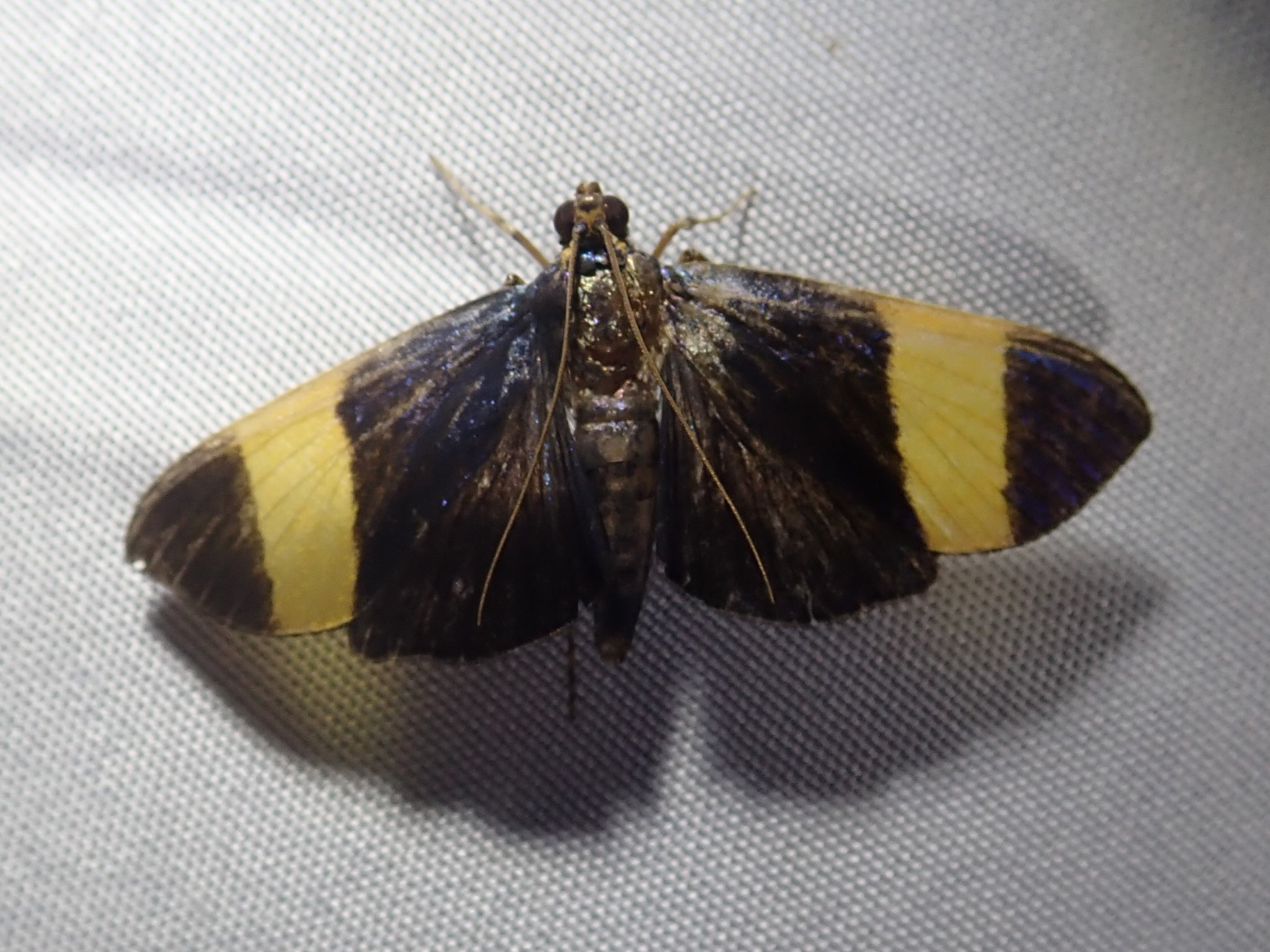

Scientific classification
- Kingdom: Animalia
- Phylum: Arthropoda
- Class: Insecta
- Order: Lepidoptera
- Family: Crambidae
- Genus: Pilocrocis
- Species: P. xanthozonalis

Binomial name
- Pilocrocis xanthozonalis Hampson, 1912

= Pilocrocis xanthozonalis =

Species of moth

Pilocrocis xanthozonalis is a species of moth in the family Crambidae (crambid snout moths). It is part of the Lepidoptera species, an order of insects that also includes butterflies. It was described by George Hampson in 1912. It is found in French Guiana, Guyana and Costa Rica.

== Description ==
The wingspan is about 42 mm. The wings are black-brown with a purplish gloss, the forewings with a broad straight oblique yellow band from the costa just beyond the middle to the termen from vein 2 to the tornus.
