= Pilocrocis anigrusalis =

Scientific classification
- Kingdom: Animalia
- Phylum: Arthropoda
- Class: Insecta
- Order: Lepidoptera
- Family: Crambidae
- Genus: Pilocrocis
- Species: P. anigrusalis

Binomial name
- Pilocrocis anigrusalis (Walker, 1859)

Synonyms
- Botys anigrusalis Walker, 1859

Species of moth

Pilocrocis anigrusalis is a species of moth in the family Crambidae. It was described by Francis Walker in 1859. It is found on Borneo.
