= Pilocrocis confixalis =

Scientific classification
- Kingdom: Animalia
- Phylum: Arthropoda
- Class: Insecta
- Order: Lepidoptera
- Family: Crambidae
- Genus: Pilocrocis
- Species: P. confixalis

Binomial name
- Pilocrocis confixalis (Walker, 1866)

Synonyms
- Botys confixalis Walker, 1866; Botys conjunctalis Walker, 1866

Species of moth

Pilocrocis confixalis is a species of moth in the family Crambidae. It was described by Francis Walker in 1866. It is found in New Guinea and on the Sula Islands.
