= Pilocrocis synomotis =

Scientific classification
- Kingdom: Animalia
- Phylum: Arthropoda
- Class: Insecta
- Order: Lepidoptera
- Family: Crambidae
- Genus: Pilocrocis
- Species: P. synomotis

Binomial name
- Pilocrocis synomotis (Meyrick, 1894)

Synonyms
- Anisoctena synomotis Meyrick, 1894

Species of moth

Pilocrocis synomotis is a moth in the family Crambidae. It was described by Edward Meyrick in 1894. It is found on Sulawesi in Indonesia.
