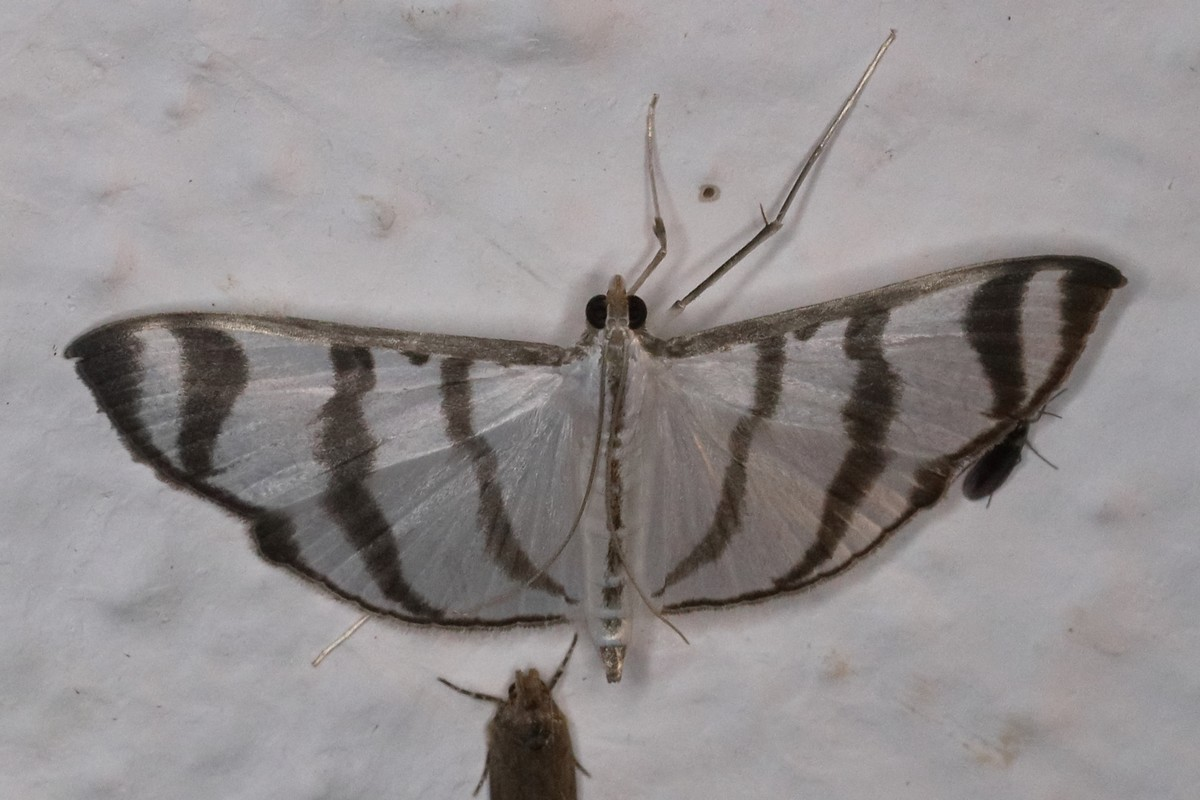

Scientific classification
- Kingdom: Animalia
- Phylum: Arthropoda
- Class: Insecta
- Order: Lepidoptera
- Family: Crambidae
- Subfamily: Spilomelinae
- Genus: Zebronia; Hübner, 1821

= Zebronia =

Genus of moths

Zebronia is a genus of moths of the family Crambidae described by Jacob Hübner in 1821.

== Species ==
- Zebronia mahensis (T. B. Fletcher, 1910)
- Zebronia ornatalis Leech, 1889
- Zebronia phenice (Stoll in Cramer & Stoll, 1782)
- Zebronia trilinealis Walker, 1865
- Zebronia virginalis Viette, 1958

== Former species ==
- Zebronia mariaehelenae Legrand, 1966
