= Pilocrocis cyranonalis =

Scientific classification
- Domain: Eukaryota
- Kingdom: Animalia
- Phylum: Arthropoda
- Class: Insecta
- Order: Lepidoptera
- Family: Crambidae
- Genus: Pilocrocis
- Species: P. cyranonalis

Binomial name
- Pilocrocis cyranonalis Schaus, 1920

Species of moth

Pilocrocis cyranonalis is a moth in the family Crambidae. It was described by William Schaus in 1920. It is found in Guatemala.

The wingspan is about 34 mm. The wings are brown with a faint purplish tinge, the forewings with opalescent white spots, finely edged with fuscous brown. The hindwings have a darker line on the discocellular, followed by a faintly hyaline spot. The postmedial line is darker and dentate opposite the cell.
