= Hyperlais argillacealis =

Scientific classification
- Kingdom: Animalia
- Phylum: Arthropoda
- Clade: Pancrustacea
- Class: Insecta
- Order: Lepidoptera
- Family: Crambidae
- Genus: Hyperlais
- Species: H. argillacealis

Binomial name
- Hyperlais argillacealis (Zeller, 1847)

Synonyms
- Botys argillacealis Zeller, 1847

Species of moth

Hyperlais argillacealis is a species of moth in the family Crambidae described by Philipp Christoph Zeller in 1847. It is found in Croatia, North Macedonia, Greece and on Sicily and Crete.
