= Pilocrocis pachyceralis =

Scientific classification
- Kingdom: Animalia
- Phylum: Arthropoda
- Class: Insecta
- Order: Lepidoptera
- Family: Crambidae
- Genus: Pilocrocis
- Species: P. pachyceralis

Binomial name
- Pilocrocis pachyceralis Hampson, 1917

Species of moth

Pilocrocis pachyceralis is a moth in the family Crambidae. It was described by George Hampson in 1917. It is found in Papua New Guinea.

The wingspan is about 38 mm. The forewings are white, with a golden yellow tinge. The costal area is yellow with a reddish tinge to beyond the middle. There is a small cupreous brown spot at the base of the median nervure and a larger subbasal spot in and below the cell. There is a curved dark brown antemedial line from the subcostal nervure to the above the inner margin, forming small black spots in the area below the cell. There is some yellow suffusion irrorated with brown below the end of the cell and at the middle of the inner margin. The postmedial line is formed by a series of small black-brown lunules. The hindwings are white with a slight yellow tinge. There is a black-brown discoidal annulus, as well as a maculate black-brown postmedial line. The terminal area is yellowish, irrorated with brown to vein 4, as well as a brown terminal line.
