= Pilocrocis guianalis =

Scientific classification
- Domain: Eukaryota
- Kingdom: Animalia
- Phylum: Arthropoda
- Class: Insecta
- Order: Lepidoptera
- Family: Crambidae
- Genus: Pilocrocis
- Species: P. guianalis

Binomial name
- Pilocrocis guianalis Schaus, 1920

Species of moth

Pilocrocis guianalis is a moth in the family Crambidae. It was described by William Schaus in 1920. It is found in French Guiana.

The wingspan is about 30 mm. The forewings are dull grey brown with a fine darker antemedial line from the subcostal and a medial darker spot in the cell, followed by an ochreous spot. There is a double incurved fuscous line on the discocellular divided by a fine ochreous line. The postmedial line is faint, preceded by small pale ochreous spots. The hindwings have a fuscous shade on the discocellular, followed by a pale ochreous spot which is outwardly edged by a faintly darker postmedial line.
