= Psara guatalis =

Scientific classification
- Kingdom: Animalia
- Phylum: Arthropoda
- Class: Insecta
- Order: Lepidoptera
- Family: Crambidae
- Genus: Psara
- Species: P. guatalis

Binomial name
- Psara guatalis Schaus, 1920

Species of moth

Psara guatalis is a species of moth in the family Crambidae. It was described by William Schaus in 1920. It is found in Guatemala.

== Description ==
The wingspan is about 27 mm. The forewings are silky brown, faintly tinged with purple. There is an almost imperceptible dark postmedial line. The hindwings are silky brown and more thinly scaled.
