= Pilocrocis angulifera =

Scientific classification
- Domain: Eukaryota
- Kingdom: Animalia
- Phylum: Arthropoda
- Class: Insecta
- Order: Lepidoptera
- Family: Crambidae
- Genus: Pilocrocis
- Species: P. angulifera

Binomial name
- Pilocrocis angulifera Kenrick, 1912

Species of moth

Pilocrocis angulifera is a species of moth in the family Crambidae. It was described by George Hamilton Kenrick in 1912. It is found in Papua New Guinea.
