= Hyperlais glyceralis =

Scientific classification
- Domain: Eukaryota
- Kingdom: Animalia
- Phylum: Arthropoda
- Class: Insecta
- Order: Lepidoptera
- Family: Crambidae
- Genus: Hyperlais
- Species: H. glyceralis

Binomial name
- Hyperlais glyceralis (Staudinger, 1859)

Synonyms
- Botys glyceralis Staudinger, 1859

Species of moth

Hyperlais glyceralis is a species of moth in the family Crambidae. It was described by Otto Staudinger in 1859 and is found in Spain.

The wingspan is 12–20 mm.
