= Pilocrocis latifuscalis =

Scientific classification
- Kingdom: Animalia
- Phylum: Arthropoda
- Class: Insecta
- Order: Lepidoptera
- Family: Crambidae
- Genus: Pilocrocis
- Species: P. latifuscalis

Binomial name
- Pilocrocis latifuscalis Hampson, 1899

Species of moth

Pilocrocis latifuscalis is a moth in the family Crambidae. It was described by George Hampson in 1899. It is found on Ambon Island in Indonesia.
