= Mimudea rocinalis =

Scientific classification
- Domain: Eukaryota
- Kingdom: Animalia
- Phylum: Arthropoda
- Class: Insecta
- Order: Lepidoptera
- Family: Crambidae
- Genus: Mimudea
- Species: M. rocinalis

Binomial name
- Mimudea rocinalis (Dognin, 1897)

Synonyms
- Botys rocinalis Dognin, 1897

Species of moth

Mimudea rocinalis is a moth in the family Crambidae. It was described by Paul Dognin in 1897. It is found in Loja Province, Ecuador.
