= Mimudea ignitalis =

Scientific classification
- Kingdom: Animalia
- Phylum: Arthropoda
- Class: Insecta
- Order: Lepidoptera
- Family: Crambidae
- Genus: Mimudea
- Species: M. ignitalis

Binomial name
- Mimudea ignitalis (Hampson, 1913)

Synonyms
- Pionea ignitalis Hampson, 1913

Species of moth

Mimudea ignitalis is a moth in the family Crambidae. It was described by George Hampson in 1913. It is found in Nigeria.
