= Psara palpalis =

Scientific classification
- Kingdom: Animalia
- Phylum: Arthropoda
- Class: Insecta
- Order: Lepidoptera
- Family: Crambidae
- Genus: Psara
- Species: P. palpalis

Binomial name
- Psara palpalis Hampson, 1918

Species of moth

Psara palpalis is a species of moth in the family Crambidae. It was described by George Hampson in 1918. It is found in Cameroon and Malawi.
