= Pilocrocis cryptalis =

Scientific classification
- Domain: Eukaryota
- Kingdom: Animalia
- Phylum: Arthropoda
- Class: Insecta
- Order: Lepidoptera
- Family: Crambidae
- Genus: Pilocrocis
- Species: P. cryptalis

Binomial name
- Pilocrocis cryptalis (H. Druce, 1895)

Synonyms
- Phostria cryptalis H. Druce, 1895

Species of moth

Pilocrocis cryptalis is a species of moth in the family Crambidae. It was described by Herbert Druce in 1895. It is found in Honduras, Costa Rica, Panama and French Guiana.
