= Hyperlais cruzae =

Scientific classification
- Domain: Eukaryota
- Kingdom: Animalia
- Phylum: Arthropoda
- Class: Insecta
- Order: Lepidoptera
- Family: Crambidae
- Genus: Hyperlais
- Species: H. cruzae

Binomial name
- Hyperlais cruzae (Agenjo, 1953)

Synonyms
- Cybalomia cruzae Agenjo, 1953

Species of moth

Hyperlais cruzae is a species of moth in the family Crambidae described by Ramón Agenjo Cecilia in 1953. It is found in Spain and southern France.
