= Mimudea tristigmalis =

Scientific classification
- Kingdom: Animalia
- Phylum: Arthropoda
- Class: Insecta
- Order: Lepidoptera
- Family: Crambidae
- Genus: Mimudea
- Species: M. tristigmalis

Binomial name
- Mimudea tristigmalis (Hampson, 1918)

Synonyms
- Hapalia tristigmalis Hampson, 1918

Species of moth

Mimudea tristigmalis is a moth in the family Crambidae. It was described by George Hampson in 1918. It is found in Colombia.
