= Mimudea poliosticta =

Scientific classification
- Kingdom: Animalia
- Phylum: Arthropoda
- Class: Insecta
- Order: Lepidoptera
- Family: Crambidae
- Genus: Mimudea
- Species: M. poliosticta

Binomial name
- Mimudea poliosticta (Hampson, 1903)

Synonyms
- Pionea poliosticta Hampson, 1903

Species of moth

Mimudea poliosticta is a moth in the family Crambidae. It was described by George Hampson in 1903. It is found in Sri Lanka.
