= Mimudea selenographa =

Scientific classification
- Kingdom: Animalia
- Phylum: Arthropoda
- Clade: Pancrustacea
- Class: Insecta
- Order: Lepidoptera
- Family: Crambidae
- Genus: Mimudea
- Species: M. selenographa

Binomial name
- Mimudea selenographa (Meyrick, 1936)

Synonyms
- Oneida selenographa Meyrick, 1936

Species of moth

Mimudea selenographa is a moth in the family Crambidae. It was described by Edward Meyrick in 1936. It is found in the Democratic Republic of the Congo (Katanga Province).
