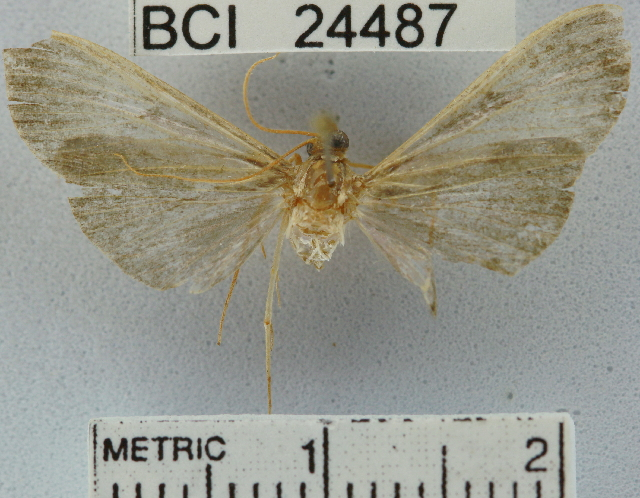

Scientific classification
- Kingdom: Animalia
- Phylum: Arthropoda
- Class: Insecta
- Order: Lepidoptera
- Family: Crambidae
- Genus: Pilocrocis
- Species: P. musalis

Binomial name
- Pilocrocis musalis Schaus, 1912

= Pilocrocis musalis =

Species of moth

Pilocrocis musalis is a moth in the family Crambidae. It was described by Schaus in 1912. It is found in Costa Rica and Panama.

The wingspan is about 30 mm. The forewings are brown, tinged with purplish. The costal margin is fuscous and there are four semi-hyaline whitish spots beyond the cell from veins 3-7, as well as a small spot in the cell, all are rather indistinct. The hindwings are silky brown, thinly scaled near the cell, between veins 2 and 4 and above 5.
