= Psara acrospila =

Scientific classification
- Kingdom: Animalia
- Phylum: Arthropoda
- Class: Insecta
- Order: Lepidoptera
- Family: Crambidae
- Genus: Psara
- Species: P. acrospila

Binomial name
- Psara acrospila (Meyrick, 1886)

Synonyms
- Epichronistis acrospila Meyrick, 1886

Species of moth

Psara acrospila is a species of moth in the family Crambidae. It was first described by Edward Meyrick in 1886. It is found on Fiji, Tonga, the Maldives, Mauritius and in the Democratic Republic of the Congo (Equateur, East Kasai).

The larvae feed on Bidens pilosa.
