= Pilocrocis cuprealis =

Scientific classification
- Kingdom: Animalia
- Phylum: Arthropoda
- Class: Insecta
- Order: Lepidoptera
- Family: Crambidae
- Genus: Pilocrocis
- Species: P. cuprealis

Binomial name
- Pilocrocis cuprealis Hampson, 1912

Species of moth

Pilocrocis cuprealis is a species of moth in the family Crambidae. It was described by George Hampson in 1912. It is found in Nigeria.

The wingspan is about 34 mm. The wings are uniform dark brown with a bright cupreous gloss.
