= Psara chathamalis =

Scientific classification
- Kingdom: Animalia
- Phylum: Arthropoda
- Class: Insecta
- Order: Lepidoptera
- Family: Crambidae
- Genus: Psara
- Species: P. chathamalis

Binomial name
- Psara chathamalis (Schaus, 1923)

Synonyms
- Pilocrocis chathamalis Schaus, 1923; Herpetogramma chathamalis

Species of moth

Psara chathamalis is a species of moth in the family Crambidae. It was first described by Schaus in 1923. It is found on the Galapagos Islands.
