= Pilocrocis italavalis =

Scientific classification
- Kingdom: Animalia
- Phylum: Arthropoda
- Class: Insecta
- Order: Lepidoptera
- Family: Crambidae
- Genus: Pilocrocis
- Species: P. italavalis

Binomial name
- Pilocrocis italavalis Viette, 1958

Species of moth

Pilocrocis italavalis is a moth in the family Crambidae. It was described by Viette in 1958. It is found in Madagascar.
