= Pilocrocis xanthostictalis =

Scientific classification
- Kingdom: Animalia
- Phylum: Arthropoda
- Class: Insecta
- Order: Lepidoptera
- Family: Crambidae
- Genus: Pilocrocis
- Species: P. xanthostictalis

Binomial name
- Pilocrocis xanthostictalis Hampson, 1908

Synonyms
- Entephria straminealis Gaede, 1917; Sylepta malgassica Kenrick, 1917

Species of moth

Pilocrocis xanthostictalis is a moth in the family Crambidae. It was described by George Hampson in 1908. It is found in the Democratic Republic of the Congo, Madagascar and Tanzania.

The wingspan is about 26 mm. The forewings are red brown with a dark antemedial line, with a yellow band on its inner side from below the costa to the inner margin. There is a black spot in the middle of the cell and discoidal lunule, with a quadrate white patch between them. There is also a dark postmedial line, with a dentate yellow mark on its outer edge below the costa, as well as three minute dentate spots between veins 5 and 2, and a lunule below the angle of the cell. The hindwings are yellow with a dark discoidal bar and some brown suffusion below the end of the cell. The postmedial line is brown and there is a broad brown terminal band.
