= Psara dorcalis =

Scientific classification
- Kingdom: Animalia
- Phylum: Arthropoda
- Class: Insecta
- Order: Lepidoptera
- Family: Crambidae
- Genus: Psara
- Species: P. dorcalis

Binomial name
- Psara dorcalis (Guenée, 1862)

Synonyms
- Botys dorcalis Guenée, 1862; Filodes grisealis Kenrick, 1917

Species of moth

Psara dorcalis is a species of moth in the family Crambidae. It was described by Achille Guenée in 1862. It is found in the Democratic Republic of the Congo (the former Katanga Province), Rwanda, Réunion, Madagascar and Mauritius.

The larvae feed on Salvia officinalis and Ocimum basilicum.
