= Pilocrocis laralis =

Scientific classification
- Kingdom: Animalia
- Phylum: Arthropoda
- Class: Insecta
- Order: Lepidoptera
- Family: Crambidae
- Genus: Pilocrocis
- Species: P. laralis

Binomial name
- Pilocrocis laralis Hampson, 1909

Species of moth

Pilocrocis laralis is a moth in the family Crambidae. It was described by George Hampson in 1909. It is found in Uganda.
