= Psara simillima =

Scientific classification
- Kingdom: Animalia
- Phylum: Arthropoda
- Class: Insecta
- Order: Lepidoptera
- Family: Crambidae
- Genus: Psara
- Species: P. simillima

Binomial name
- Psara simillima (Hampson, 1913)

Synonyms
- Pachyzancla simillima Hampson, 1913

Species of moth

Psara simillima is a species of moth in the family Crambidae. It was described by George Hampson in 1913. It is found in Papua New Guinea, where it has been recorded from the D'Entrecasteaux Islands (Fergusson Island).
