= Psara pargialis =

Scientific classification
- Kingdom: Animalia
- Phylum: Arthropoda
- Class: Insecta
- Order: Lepidoptera
- Family: Crambidae
- Genus: Psara
- Species: P. pargialis

Binomial name
- Psara pargialis (Schaus, 1920)

Synonyms
- Pilocrocis pargialis Schaus, 1920

Species of moth

Psara pargialis is a species of moth in the family Crambidae. It was described by William Schaus in 1920. It is found in Paraná, Brazil and Cuba.

== Description ==
The wingspan is about 30 mm. The wings are grey brown and rather thinly scaled and with fine fuscous brown lines. There is an indistinct subbasal line on the forewings, as well as a slightly outcurved, deeply wavy antemedial line and a faint whitish discocellular line, with dark edging. The postmedial line is wavy. The hindwings have a dark line on discocellular. The postmedial line is dentate and there is a dark terminal line.
