= Pilocrocis calamistis =

Scientific classification
- Kingdom: Animalia
- Phylum: Arthropoda
- Class: Insecta
- Order: Lepidoptera
- Family: Crambidae
- Genus: Pilocrocis
- Species: P. calamistis

Binomial name
- Pilocrocis calamistis Hampson, 1899

Species of moth

Pilocrocis calamistis is a species of moth in the family Crambidae. It was described by George Hampson in 1899. It is found in the Mexican state of Veracruz and Costa Rica.

== Description ==
The wingspan is about 32 mm. Adults are ochreous yellow, the forewings with a slight fuscous streak below the basal half of the costa and a curved antemedial line, as well as a speck in the cell and discoidal lunule. The hindwings have a discoidal spot and postmedial as on the forewings, but there is an oblique fuscous shade. Both the forewings and hindwings have a fuscous terminal line.
