= Hyperlais dulcinalis =

Scientific classification
- Domain: Eukaryota
- Kingdom: Animalia
- Phylum: Arthropoda
- Class: Insecta
- Order: Lepidoptera
- Family: Crambidae
- Genus: Hyperlais
- Species: H. dulcinalis

Binomial name
- Hyperlais dulcinalis (Treitschke, 1835)

Synonyms
- Pyrausta dulcinalis Treitschke, 1835

Species of moth

Hyperlais dulcinalis is a species of moth in the family Crambidae described by Georg Friedrich Treitschke in 1835. It is found in Italy, Croatia, Hungary, Romania, Bulgaria, the Republic of Macedonia, Greece, Turkey and Russia.

The wingspan is 15–17 mm. Adults are on wing from May to August in one generation per year.
