= Mimudea hyalopunctalis =

Scientific classification
- Domain: Eukaryota
- Kingdom: Animalia
- Phylum: Arthropoda
- Class: Insecta
- Order: Lepidoptera
- Family: Crambidae
- Genus: Mimudea
- Species: M. hyalopunctalis

Binomial name
- Mimudea hyalopunctalis Dognin, 1912

Species of moth

Mimudea hyalopunctalis is a moth in the family Crambidae. It was described by Paul Dognin in 1912. It is found in Colombia.
