= Mimudea bryophilalis =

Scientific classification
- Kingdom: Animalia
- Phylum: Arthropoda
- Class: Insecta
- Order: Lepidoptera
- Family: Crambidae
- Genus: Mimudea
- Species: M. bryophilalis

Binomial name
- Mimudea bryophilalis (Hampson, 1903)

Synonyms
- Pionea bryophilalis Hampson, 1903

Species of moth

Mimudea bryophilalis is a moth in the family Crambidae. It was described by George Hampson in 1903. It is found in Himachal Pradesh, India.
