= Pilocrocis fumidalis =

Scientific classification
- Kingdom: Animalia
- Phylum: Arthropoda
- Class: Insecta
- Order: Lepidoptera
- Family: Crambidae
- Genus: Pilocrocis
- Species: P. fumidalis

Binomial name
- Pilocrocis fumidalis Hampson, 1912

Species of moth

Pilocrocis fumidalis is a moth in the family Crambidae. It was described by George Hampson in 1912. It is found on Borneo.

The wingspan is about 46 mm. The forewings are fuscous brown with an indistinct fuscous spot towards the end of the cell and discoidal lunule. The postmedial line is fuscous and there is a fine pale line at the base of the cilia. The hindwings are fuscous brown, with a slight dark discoidal spot and traces of a fuscous postmedial line .
