= Mimudea subochracealis =

Scientific classification
- Domain: Eukaryota
- Kingdom: Animalia
- Phylum: Arthropoda
- Class: Insecta
- Order: Lepidoptera
- Family: Crambidae
- Genus: Mimudea
- Species: M. subochracealis

Binomial name
- Mimudea subochracealis (Pagenstecher, 1884)

Synonyms
- Botys subochracealis Pagenstecher, 1884

Species of moth

Mimudea subochracealis is a moth in the family Crambidae. It was described by Pagenstecher in 1884. It is found in Indonesia (Ambon Island).
