= Pilocrocis evanidalis =

Scientific classification
- Domain: Eukaryota
- Kingdom: Animalia
- Phylum: Arthropoda
- Class: Insecta
- Order: Lepidoptera
- Family: Crambidae
- Genus: Pilocrocis
- Species: P. evanidalis

Binomial name
- Pilocrocis evanidalis Schaus, 1920

Species of moth

Pilocrocis evanidalis is a moth in the family Crambidae. It was described by Schaus in 1920. It is found in Guatemala.

The wingspan is about 30 mm. The wings are silky brown, faintly cupreous. The forewings have a faint, darker, antemedial line, and there is a small dark and narrow linear spot on the discocellular area. The postmedial line is fine and slightly darker. The hindwings have very faint traces of a postmedial line.
