= Mimudea praepandalis =

Scientific classification
- Kingdom: Animalia
- Phylum: Arthropoda
- Class: Insecta
- Order: Lepidoptera
- Family: Crambidae
- Genus: Mimudea
- Species: M. praepandalis

Binomial name
- Mimudea praepandalis (Snellen, 1890)

Synonyms
- Pionea praepandalis Snellen, 1890

Species of moth

Mimudea praepandalis is a moth in the family Crambidae. It was described by Snellen in 1890. It is found in India (Darjeeling, Sikkim).
