= Pilocrocis dichocrosialis =

Scientific classification
- Kingdom: Animalia
- Phylum: Arthropoda
- Class: Insecta
- Order: Lepidoptera
- Family: Crambidae
- Genus: Pilocrocis
- Species: P. dichocrosialis

Binomial name
- Pilocrocis dichocrosialis Hampson, 1912

Synonyms
- Conogethes euryatma Meyrick, 1934; Dichocrocis usticinctalis Hampson, 1912; Entephria nigrianalis Gaede, 1917; Piletocera nigridentalis Hampson, 1918

Species of moth

Pilocrocis dichocrosialis is a species of moth in the family Crambidae. It was described by George Hampson in 1912. It is found in Cameroon, the Democratic Republic of the Congo (Katanga), Malawi, Mozambique, Zambia and Zimbabwe.

== Description ==
The wingspan is about 26 mm. The wings are orange-yellow, the forewings with paired dorsal black spots on the second segment and dorsal bands on the segments beyond it, as well as some sublateral points. The forewings also have a black spot at the base of the costa and some diffused black on the inner margin near the base, as well as an antemedial spot below the costa and a curved line from the median nervure to the inner margin and a black spot in the middle of the cell and the discoidal bar. The postmedial line is indistinct with a broad band of fuscous suffusion beyond it except at the costa. The hindwings have a slightly sinuous medial black line with a broad band of fuscous suffusion beyond it.
