= Pilocrocis runatalis =

Scientific classification
- Domain: Eukaryota
- Kingdom: Animalia
- Phylum: Arthropoda
- Class: Insecta
- Order: Lepidoptera
- Family: Crambidae
- Genus: Pilocrocis
- Species: P. runatalis

Binomial name
- Pilocrocis runatalis Dyar, 1914

Species of moth

Pilocrocis runatalis is a moth in the family Crambidae. It was described by Harrison Gray Dyar Jr. in 1914. It is found in Panama.

The wingspan is about 20 mm. The forewings are a little bronzy-blackish brown with dark lines, the inner one obscure and the outer line rather broad. The reniform (kidney-shaped) spot is solid, black and distinct. The hindwings have a nearly regularly curved medial line.
