= Pilocrocis nubilinea =

Scientific classification
- Kingdom: Animalia
- Phylum: Arthropoda
- Class: Insecta
- Order: Lepidoptera
- Family: Crambidae
- Genus: Pilocrocis
- Species: P. nubilinea

Binomial name
- Pilocrocis nubilinea Bethune-Baker, 1909

Species of moth

Pilocrocis nubilinea is a moth in the family Crambidae. It was described by George Thomas Bethune-Baker in 1909. It is found in the Democratic Republic of the Congo (Orientale).
