= Pilocrocis rooalis =

Scientific classification
- Kingdom: Animalia
- Phylum: Arthropoda
- Class: Insecta
- Order: Lepidoptera
- Family: Crambidae
- Genus: Pilocrocis
- Species: P. rooalis

Binomial name
- Pilocrocis rooalis (Snellen, 1875)

Synonyms
- Ceratoclasis rooalis Snellen, 1875

Species of moth

Pilocrocis rooalis is a moth in the family Crambidae. It was described by Snellen in 1875. It is found in Colombia.
