= Pilocrocis roxonalis =

Scientific classification
- Domain: Eukaryota
- Kingdom: Animalia
- Phylum: Arthropoda
- Class: Insecta
- Order: Lepidoptera
- Family: Crambidae
- Genus: Pilocrocis
- Species: P. roxonalis

Binomial name
- Pilocrocis roxonalis (H. Druce, 1895)

Synonyms
- Omiodes roxonalis H. Druce, 1895; Omiodes roseinalis Hampson, 1912

Species of moth

Pilocrocis roxonalis is a moth in the family Crambidae. It was described by Herbert Druce in 1895. It is found in Panama and Costa Rica.

The forewings and hindwings are pale glossy brown, in some lights showing a purplish shade.
