= Pilocrocis granjae =

Scientific classification
- Domain: Eukaryota
- Kingdom: Animalia
- Phylum: Arthropoda
- Class: Insecta
- Order: Lepidoptera
- Family: Crambidae
- Genus: Pilocrocis
- Species: P. granjae

Binomial name
- Pilocrocis granjae F. Hoffmann, 1934

Species of moth

Pilocrocis granjae is a moth in the family Crambidae. It was described by F. Hoffmann in 1934. It is found in Mexico.
