= Pilocrocis caustichroalis =

Scientific classification
- Kingdom: Animalia
- Phylum: Arthropoda
- Class: Insecta
- Order: Lepidoptera
- Family: Crambidae
- Genus: Pilocrocis
- Species: P. caustichroalis

Binomial name
- Pilocrocis caustichroalis Hampson, 1918

Species of moth

Pilocrocis caustichroalis is a species of moth in the family Crambidae. It was described by George Hampson in 1918. It is found in Peru.

== Description ==
The wingspan is about 30 mm. The forewings are yellowish suffused with brick-red. The antemedial line is red-brown and there is a minute red-brown spot in the upper part of the middle of the cell and discoidal bar. The postmedial line is red-brown. The hindwings are yellowish suffused with brick-red, the costal area white to beyond the middle. There is an oblique red-brown discoidal bar and the postmedial line is red-brown, as well as a faint punctiform brownish terminal line.
