= Mimudea dithyralis =

Scientific classification
- Domain: Eukaryota
- Kingdom: Animalia
- Phylum: Arthropoda
- Class: Insecta
- Order: Lepidoptera
- Family: Crambidae
- Genus: Mimudea
- Species: M. dithyralis

Binomial name
- Mimudea dithyralis Dognin, 1910

Species of moth

Mimudea dithyralis is a moth in the family Crambidae. It was described by Paul Dognin in 1910. It is found in Peru.
