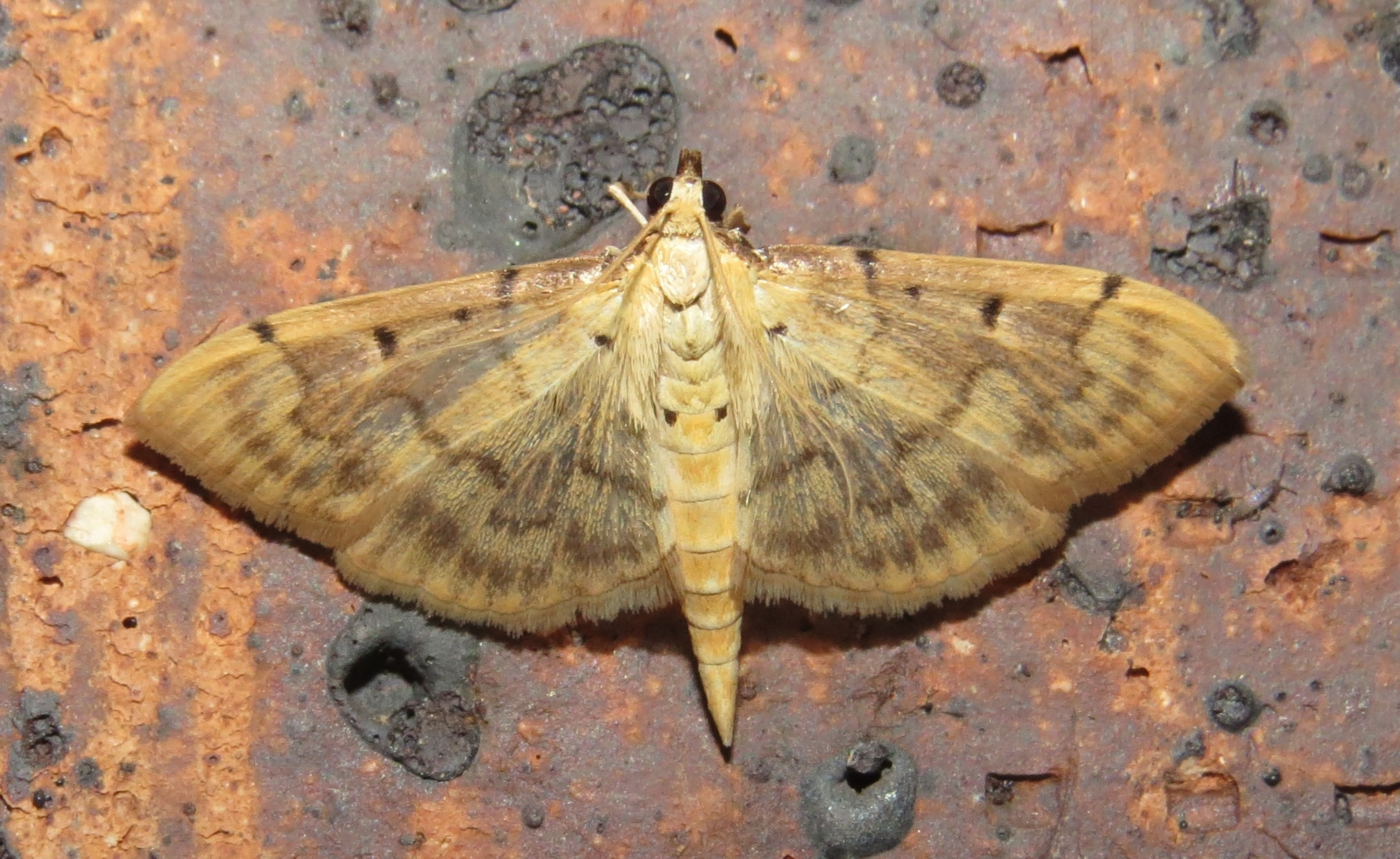

Scientific classification
- Kingdom: Animalia
- Phylum: Arthropoda
- Class: Insecta
- Order: Lepidoptera
- Family: Crambidae
- Genus: Psara
- Species: P. atritermina

Binomial name
- Psara atritermina (Hampson, 1913)

Synonyms
- Pachyzancla atritermina Hampson, 1913

= Psara atritermina =

Species of moth

Psara atritermina is a species of moth in the family Crambidae. It was first described by George Hampson in 1913. It is found in Kenya, South Africa and India.
