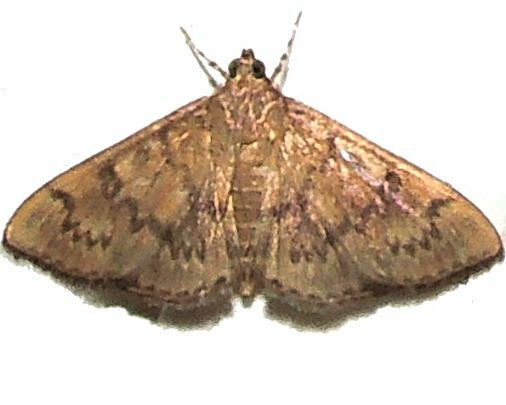

Scientific classification
- Kingdom: Animalia
- Phylum: Arthropoda
- Class: Insecta
- Order: Lepidoptera
- Family: Crambidae
- Genus: Psara
- Species: P. obscuralis

Binomial name
- Psara obscuralis (Lederer, 1863)

Synonyms
- Botys obscuralis Lederer, 1863

= Psara obscuralis =

Species of moth

Psara obscuralis, commonly known as the obscure psara moth, is a species of moth in the family Crambidae. It is found in North America, where it has been recorded from Maryland to Florida, west to Texas and Illinois. In the south, the range extends to Central America, where it has been recorded from Mexico and Costa Rica.

== Description ==
The wingspan is about 23 mm. Adults are on wing from May to September.

== Behaviour and ecology ==
The larvae feed on Petiveria alliacea and Phytolacca americana.
