= Mimudea mendicalis =

Scientific classification
- Domain: Eukaryota
- Kingdom: Animalia
- Phylum: Arthropoda
- Class: Insecta
- Order: Lepidoptera
- Family: Crambidae
- Genus: Mimudea
- Species: M. mendicalis

Binomial name
- Mimudea mendicalis (South in Leech & South, 1901)

Synonyms
- Pionea mendicalis South in Leech & South, 1901

Species of moth

Mimudea mendicalis is a moth in the family Crambidae. It was described by South in 1901. It is found in China.

The wingspan is about 28 mm. The forewings are ochreous brown with a dot in the cell and an annulus at the end of the cell, both blackish. The postmedial line is also blackish, slightly dentate, curved round the end of the cell and terminating about the middle of the inner margin. The hindwings are whitish tinged with ochreous on the outer area and the postmedial line is blackish, interrupted towards vein 2 and not continued to the abdominal margin.
