= Psara ultratrinalis =

Scientific classification
- Kingdom: Animalia
- Phylum: Arthropoda
- Class: Insecta
- Order: Lepidoptera
- Family: Crambidae
- Genus: Psara
- Species: P. ultratrinalis

Binomial name
- Psara ultratrinalis (Marion, 1954)

Synonyms
- Pachyzancla ultratrinalis Marion, 1954

Species of moth

Psara ultratrinalis is a species of moth in the family Crambidae. It was described by Hubert Marion in 1954. It is found on Madagascar.
