= Psara intermedialis =

Scientific classification
- Kingdom: Animalia
- Phylum: Arthropoda
- Class: Insecta
- Order: Lepidoptera
- Family: Crambidae
- Genus: Psara
- Species: P. intermedialis

Binomial name
- Psara intermedialis (Amsel, 1956)

Synonyms
- Syllepta intermedialis Amsel, 1956

Species of moth

Psara intermedialis is a species of moth in the family Crambidae. It was described by Hans Georg Amsel in 1956 and is found in Venezuela.
