= Mimudea lividalis =

Scientific classification
- Domain: Eukaryota
- Kingdom: Animalia
- Phylum: Arthropoda
- Class: Insecta
- Order: Lepidoptera
- Family: Crambidae
- Genus: Mimudea
- Species: M. lividalis

Binomial name
- Mimudea lividalis Dognin, 1905

Species of moth

Mimudea lividalis is a moth in the family Crambidae. It was described by Paul Dognin in 1905. It is found in Loja Province, Ecuador.
