= Mimudea albiflua =

Scientific classification
- Kingdom: Animalia
- Phylum: Arthropoda
- Class: Insecta
- Order: Lepidoptera
- Family: Crambidae
- Genus: Mimudea
- Species: M. albiflua

Binomial name
- Mimudea albiflua (Hampson, 1913)

Synonyms
- Pionea albiflua Hampson, 1913; Pionea albiflua var. clarescens Dognin, 1912

Species of moth

Mimudea albiflua is a moth in the family Crambidae. It was described by George Hampson in 1913. It is found in Colombia.
