= Pilocrocis pterygodia =

Scientific classification
- Kingdom: Animalia
- Phylum: Arthropoda
- Class: Insecta
- Order: Lepidoptera
- Family: Crambidae
- Genus: Pilocrocis
- Species: P. pterygodia

Binomial name
- Pilocrocis pterygodia Hampson, 1912

Species of moth

Pilocrocis pterygodia is a moth in the family Crambidae. It was described by George Hampson in 1912. It is found in Ghana, South Africa, Uganda and Zimbabwe.

The wingspan is about 26 mm. The wings are ochreous, tinged in parts with brown. There is a black point near the base of the inner margin and the antemedial line is blackish. There is also a small black spot in the middle of the cell and a somewhat lunulate discoidal spot. The postmedial line is blackish and there is a faint minutely waved fuscous subterminal line, as well as a slight terminal shade. The hindwings are ochreous, with a small black discoidal spot. The postmedial line is fuscous and there is a faint minutely waved fuscous subterminal line, as well as a fuscous terminal shade.
