= Pilocrocis dithyralis =

Scientific classification
- Kingdom: Animalia
- Phylum: Arthropoda
- Class: Insecta
- Order: Lepidoptera
- Family: Crambidae
- Genus: Pilocrocis
- Species: P. dithyralis

Binomial name
- Pilocrocis dithyralis Hampson, 1912

Species of moth

Pilocrocis dithyralis is a moth in the family Crambidae. It was described by George Hampson in 1912. It is found in Guyana.

The wingspan is about 32 mm. The wings are cupreous brown, the forewings with a hyaline white spot below the median nervure at the origin of vein 2 and a more prominent small quadrate spot beyond the dark discoidal spot.
