= Pilocrocis glaucitalis =

Scientific classification
- Kingdom: Animalia
- Phylum: Arthropoda
- Class: Insecta
- Order: Lepidoptera
- Family: Crambidae
- Genus: Pilocrocis
- Species: P. glaucitalis

Binomial name
- Pilocrocis glaucitalis Hampson, 1912

Species of moth

Pilocrocis glaucitalis is a moth in the family Crambidae. It was described by George Hampson in 1912. It is found in South Africa.

The wingspan is about 30 mm. The wings are brown with a greyish gloss and a dark antemedial line, slightly defined by whitish on the inner side. There is a dark point in the middle of the cell and a black discoidal lunule. The postmedial line is dark and defined by white on the outerside. The hindwings are brown with a greyish gloss and a black discoidal bar. The postmedial line is dark, slightly defined by grey on the outerside and there is a fine black terminal line.
