= Psara orphnopeza =

Scientific classification
- Kingdom: Animalia
- Phylum: Arthropoda
- Class: Insecta
- Order: Lepidoptera
- Family: Crambidae
- Genus: Psara
- Species: P. orphnopeza

Binomial name
- Psara orphnopeza J. F. G. Clarke, 1986

Species of moth

Psara orphnopeza is a species of moth in the family Crambidae. It was described by John Frederick Gates Clarke in 1986. It is found on the Marquesas Islands.
