= Pilocrocis phaeocoryla =

Scientific classification
- Kingdom: Animalia
- Phylum: Arthropoda
- Class: Insecta
- Order: Lepidoptera
- Family: Crambidae
- Genus: Pilocrocis
- Species: P. phaeocoryla

Binomial name
- Pilocrocis phaeocoryla Ghesquière, 1942

Species of moth

Pilocrocis phaeocoryla is a moth in the family Crambidae. It was described by Jean Ghesquière in 1942. It is found in the Democratic Republic of the Congo.
