= Mimudea permixtalis =

Scientific classification
- Kingdom: Animalia
- Phylum: Arthropoda
- Class: Insecta
- Order: Lepidoptera
- Family: Crambidae
- Genus: Mimudea
- Species: M. permixtalis

Binomial name
- Mimudea permixtalis (Walker, 1865)

Synonyms
- Scopula permixtalis Walker, 1865

Species of moth

Mimudea permixtalis is a moth in the family Crambidae. It was described by Francis Walker in 1865. It is found in Brazil.
