= Mimudea haematalis =

Scientific classification
- Kingdom: Animalia
- Phylum: Arthropoda
- Class: Insecta
- Order: Lepidoptera
- Family: Crambidae
- Genus: Mimudea
- Species: M. haematalis

Binomial name
- Mimudea haematalis (Hampson, 1913)

Synonyms
- Pionea haematalis Hampson, 1913

Species of moth

Mimudea haematalis is a moth in the family of Crambidae. It was described by George Hampson in 1913 and is found in Papua New Guinea.
