= Pilocrocis reniferalis =

Scientific classification
- Kingdom: Animalia
- Phylum: Arthropoda
- Class: Insecta
- Order: Lepidoptera
- Family: Crambidae
- Genus: Pilocrocis
- Species: P. reniferalis

Binomial name
- Pilocrocis reniferalis Hampson, 1912

Species of moth

Pilocrocis reniferalis is a moth in the family Crambidae. It was described by George Hampson in 1912. It is found in Jamaica.

The wingspan is about 34 mm. The forewings are brown with a cupreous gloss. There is an indistinct oblique diffused antemedial line and a faint spot in the middle of the cell, as well as a faint discoidal reniform spot defined by fuscous. There is an indistinct diffused postmedial line. The hindwings are brown with a cupreous gloss and with a faint oblique discoidal striga and a very indistinct postmedial line.
