= Psara jasiusalis =

Scientific classification
- Kingdom: Animalia
- Phylum: Arthropoda
- Class: Insecta
- Order: Lepidoptera
- Family: Crambidae
- Genus: Psara
- Species: P. jasiusalis

Binomial name
- Psara jasiusalis (Walker, 1859)

Synonyms
- Botys jasiusalis Walker, 1859

Species of moth

Psara jasiusalis is a species of moth in the family Crambidae. It was described by Francis Walker in 1859. It is found on Borneo and on Java, Indonesia.
