= Psara selenialis =

Scientific classification
- Kingdom: Animalia
- Phylum: Arthropoda
- Class: Insecta
- Order: Lepidoptera
- Family: Crambidae
- Genus: Psara
- Species: P. selenialis

Binomial name
- Psara selenialis Snellen, 1895

Species of moth

Psara selenialis is a species of moth in the family Crambidae. It was described by Snellen in 1895. It is found in Indonesia (Java).
