= Mimudea flavinotata =

Scientific classification
- Domain: Eukaryota
- Kingdom: Animalia
- Phylum: Arthropoda
- Class: Insecta
- Order: Lepidoptera
- Family: Crambidae
- Genus: Mimudea
- Species: M. flavinotata

Binomial name
- Mimudea flavinotata Warren, 1892

Species of moth

Mimudea flavinotata is a moth in the family of Crambidae. It was discovered by William Warren in 1892. It was found in Brazil (Rio de Janeiro).
