= Mimudea ectophaealis =

Scientific classification
- Kingdom: Animalia
- Phylum: Arthropoda
- Class: Insecta
- Order: Lepidoptera
- Family: Crambidae
- Genus: Mimudea
- Species: M. ectophaealis

Binomial name
- Mimudea ectophaealis (Hampson, 1913)

Synonyms
- Pionea ectophaealis Hampson, 1913

Species of moth

Mimudea ectophaealis is a moth in the family Crambidae. It was described by George Hampson in 1913. It is found on Ambon Island in Indonesia.
