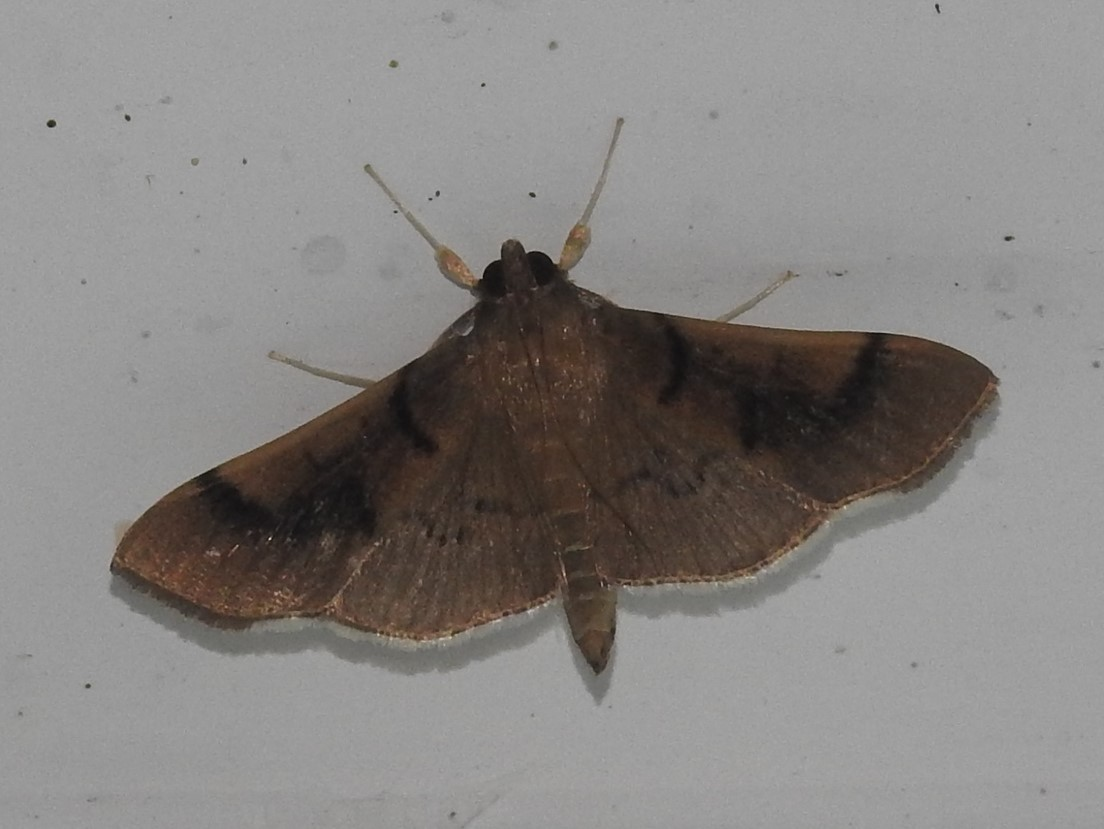

Scientific classification
- Domain: Eukaryota
- Kingdom: Animalia
- Phylum: Arthropoda
- Class: Insecta
- Order: Lepidoptera
- Family: Crambidae
- Genus: Pilocrocis
- Species: P. milvinalis

Binomial name
- Pilocrocis milvinalis (C. Swinhoe, 1885)

Synonyms
- Deba milvinalis C. Swinhoe, 1885

= Pilocrocis milvinalis =

Species of moth

Pilocrocis milvinalis is a species of moth in the family Crambidae. It was described by Charles Swinhoe in 1885. It is found in Pune, India.
