= Pilocrocis isozona =

Scientific classification
- Domain: Eukaryota
- Kingdom: Animalia
- Phylum: Arthropoda
- Class: Insecta
- Order: Lepidoptera
- Family: Crambidae
- Genus: Pilocrocis
- Species: P. isozona

Binomial name
- Pilocrocis isozona (Meyrick, 1936)

Synonyms
- Sylepta isozona Meyrick, 1936

Species of moth

Pilocrocis isozona is a moth in the family Crambidae. It was described by Edward Meyrick in 1936. It is found in Bolivia.
