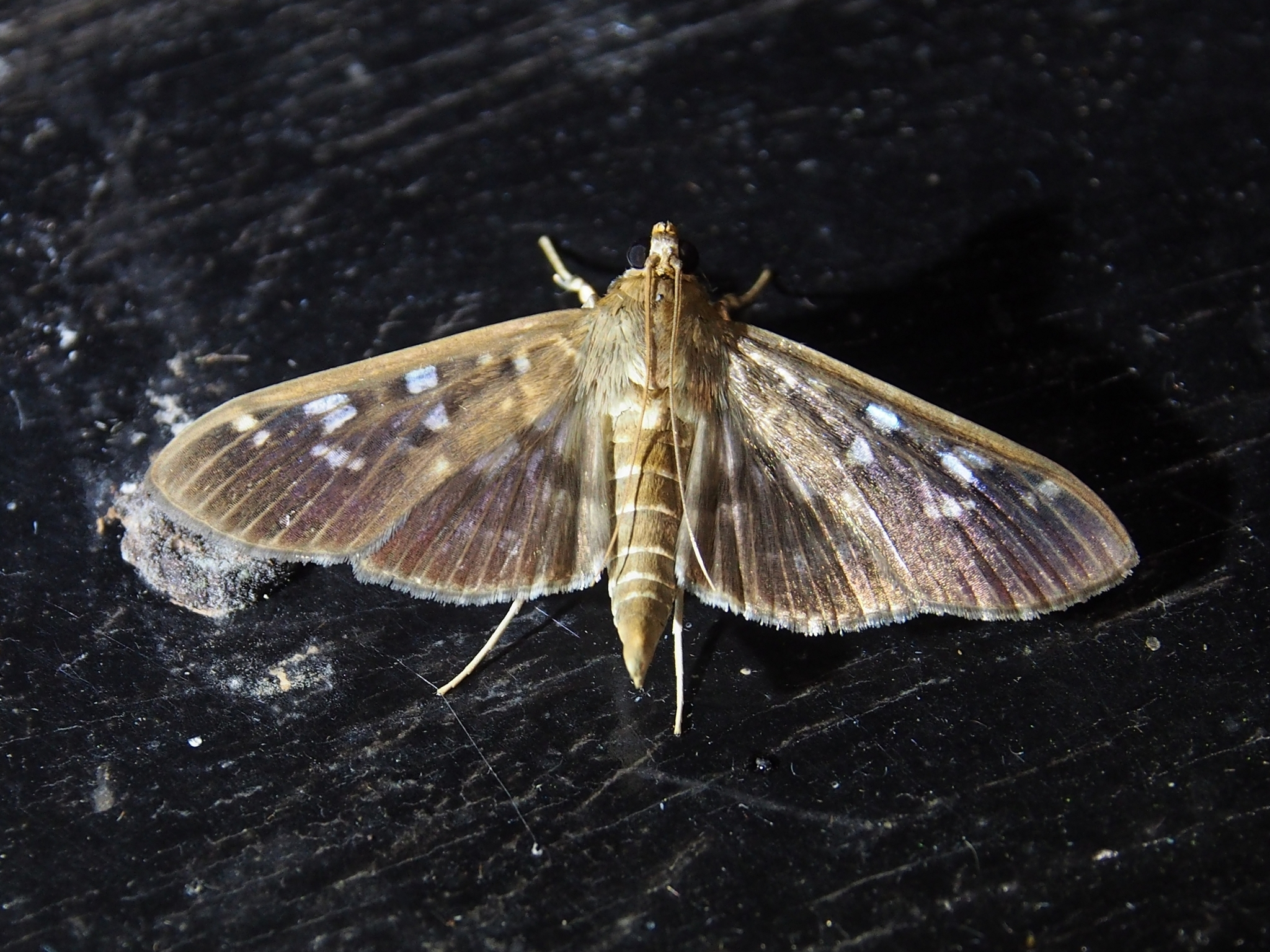

Scientific classification
- Domain: Eukaryota
- Kingdom: Animalia
- Phylum: Arthropoda
- Class: Insecta
- Order: Lepidoptera
- Family: Crambidae
- Genus: Pilocrocis
- Species: P. cyrisalis

Binomial name
- Pilocrocis cyrisalis (H. Druce, 1895)

Synonyms
- Phostria cyrisalis H. Druce, 1895

= Pilocrocis cyrisalis =

Species of moth

Pilocrocis cyrisalis is a species of moth in the family Crambidae. It was described by Herbert Druce in 1895. It is found in Panama and Costa Rica.

The forewings are pale purplish brown, crossed from the costal to the inner margin by three broken rows of white spots, beyond which are two small white spots near the apex. The hindwings are semihyaline pale brown, but paler at the base.
