= Mimudea tisiasalis =

Scientific classification
- Domain: Eukaryota
- Kingdom: Animalia
- Phylum: Arthropoda
- Class: Insecta
- Order: Lepidoptera
- Family: Crambidae
- Genus: Mimudea
- Species: M. tisiasalis

Binomial name
- Mimudea tisiasalis (H. Druce, 1899)

Synonyms
- Pionea tisiasalis H. Druce, 1899

Species of moth

Mimudea tisiasalis is a moth in the family Crambidae. It was described by Herbert Druce in 1899. It is found in Costa Rica.
