= Pilocrocis purpurascens =

Scientific classification
- Kingdom: Animalia
- Phylum: Arthropoda
- Class: Insecta
- Order: Lepidoptera
- Family: Crambidae
- Genus: Pilocrocis
- Species: P. purpurascens

Binomial name
- Pilocrocis purpurascens Hampson, 1899

Species of moth

Pilocrocis purpurascens is a moth in the family Crambidae. It was described by George Hampson in 1899. It is found in Loja Province of Ecuador and in Trinidad.

The wingspan is about 40 mm. The wings are dark fuscous with a purplish gloss. Both forewings and hindwings have faint traces of a discoidal spot and a postmedial line.
