= Psara subhyalinalis =

Scientific classification
- Kingdom: Animalia
- Phylum: Arthropoda
- Class: Insecta
- Order: Lepidoptera
- Family: Crambidae
- Genus: Psara
- Species: P. subhyalinalis

Binomial name
- Psara subhyalinalis (Herrich-Schäffer, 1871)

Synonyms
- Botys subhyalinalis Herrich-Schäffer, 1871

Species of moth

Psara subhyalinalis is a species of moth in the family Crambidae. It is found in Cuba.
