= Psara pallicaudalis =

Scientific classification
- Kingdom: Animalia
- Phylum: Arthropoda
- Class: Insecta
- Order: Lepidoptera
- Family: Crambidae
- Genus: Psara
- Species: P. pallicaudalis

Binomial name
- Psara pallicaudalis Snellen, 1875

Species of moth

Psara pallicaudalis is a species of moth in the family Crambidae. It was described by Snellen in 1875. It is found in Colombia.
