= Mimudea brevialis =

Scientific classification
- Kingdom: Animalia
- Phylum: Arthropoda
- Class: Insecta
- Order: Lepidoptera
- Family: Crambidae
- Genus: Mimudea
- Species: M. brevialis

Binomial name
- Mimudea brevialis Walker, 1859

Species of moth

Mimudea brevialis is a moth of the family Crambidae.
