= Psara hesperialis =

Scientific classification
- Kingdom: Animalia
- Phylum: Arthropoda
- Class: Insecta
- Order: Lepidoptera
- Family: Crambidae
- Genus: Psara
- Species: P. hesperialis

Binomial name
- Psara hesperialis (Herrich-Schäffer, 1871)

Synonyms
- Botys hesperialis Herrich-Schäffer, 1871

Species of moth

Psara hesperialis is a species of moth in the family Crambidae. It is found in Cuba and Costa Rica.
