= Pilocrocis buckleyi =

Scientific classification
- Domain: Eukaryota
- Kingdom: Animalia
- Phylum: Arthropoda
- Class: Insecta
- Order: Lepidoptera
- Family: Crambidae
- Genus: Pilocrocis
- Species: P. buckleyi

Binomial name
- Pilocrocis buckleyi (H. Druce, 1895)

Synonyms
- Pachynoa buckleyi H. Druce, 1895; Botys polyphemalis Snellen, 1899

Species of moth

Pilocrocis buckleyi is a species of moth in the family Crambidae. It was described by Herbert Druce in 1895. It is found in Ecuador and Peru.
