= Mimudea punctiferalis =

Scientific classification
- Domain: Eukaryota
- Kingdom: Animalia
- Phylum: Arthropoda
- Class: Insecta
- Order: Lepidoptera
- Family: Crambidae
- Genus: Mimudea
- Species: M. punctiferalis

Binomial name
- Mimudea punctiferalis (South in Leech & South, 1901)

Synonyms
- Pionea punctiferalis South in Leech & South, 1901; Udea punctiferalis South in Leech & South, 1901

Species of moth

Mimudea punctiferalis is a moth in the family Crambidae. It was described by South in 1901. It is found in China.

The wingspan is about 24 mm. The forewings are pale olive brown, clouded and suffused with darker. The reniform and orbicular marks are brown, outlined in blackish mingled with white scales. The antemedial line is whitish towards the inner margin, but not clearly defined and the postmedial line is black, slightly curved and dentate, the dentations are marked with white. There are two white spots before it opposite the end of the cell and there is a black marginal line with black dots upon it, marked with white towards the angle. The apical third of the costa is marked with darker. The hindwings are whitish suffused with fuscous, especially on the outer marginal area and there is a black dot at the upper and lower angles of the cell, as well as traces of a dusky postmedial line. There is also a marginal series of black dots, partly connected by a black line.
