= Psara admensalis =

Scientific classification
- Kingdom: Animalia
- Phylum: Arthropoda
- Class: Insecta
- Order: Lepidoptera
- Family: Crambidae
- Genus: Psara
- Species: P. admensalis

Binomial name
- Psara admensalis (Walker, 1859)

Synonyms
- Botys admensalis Walker, 1859; Herpetogramma admensalis (Walker, 1859); Herpetogramma admensails Joannis, 1925 (missspelling)

Species of moth

Psara admensalis is a species of moth in the family Crambidae. It was first described by Francis Walker in 1859. It is found in Sri Lanka, South Africa and on Réunion.

The larvae feed on Acanthus ebracteatus.
