= Pilocrocis dentilinealis =

Scientific classification
- Domain: Eukaryota
- Kingdom: Animalia
- Phylum: Arthropoda
- Class: Insecta
- Order: Lepidoptera
- Family: Crambidae
- Genus: Pilocrocis
- Species: P. dentilinealis

Binomial name
- Pilocrocis dentilinealis Schaus, 1920

Species of moth

Pilocrocis dentilinealis is a moth in the family Crambidae. It was described by William Schaus in 1920. It is found in Rio de Janeiro, Brazil.

The wingspan is about 28 mm. The wings are thinly scaled and ochreous brown with an interrupted dark terminal line. The forewings have a dark basal line across the costa and cell and there is a fine antemedial line across the cell to the submedian. There is a small dark medial spot in the cell and a fuscous-brown spot on the discocellular. The postmedial line is fine and dark brown. There is a dark line on the discocellular of the hindwings. The postmedial line is fine.
