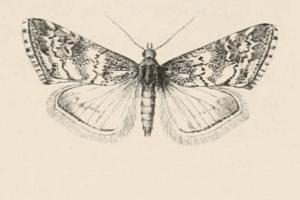

Scientific classification
- Domain: Eukaryota
- Kingdom: Animalia
- Phylum: Arthropoda
- Class: Insecta
- Order: Lepidoptera
- Family: Crambidae
- Genus: Hyperlais
- Species: H. rivasalis

Binomial name
- Hyperlais rivasalis (Vazquez, 1905)

Synonyms
- Cybalomia rivasalis Vazquez, 1905

= Hyperlais rivasalis =

Species of moth

Hyperlais rivasalis or Cybalomia rivasalis is a species of moth in the family Crambidae. It is endemic to Spain.

The wingspan is 13–15 mm. Adults fly from March–April to October–November, possibly in two generations. They occur at elevations of 221–1,040 m (725–3,412 ft) above sea level, preferably in areas with gypsum soils and gypsophilous plants. The larvae feed on Lepidium subulatum.
