= Pilocrocis flagellalis =

Scientific classification
- Domain: Eukaryota
- Kingdom: Animalia
- Phylum: Arthropoda
- Class: Insecta
- Order: Lepidoptera
- Family: Crambidae
- Genus: Pilocrocis
- Species: P. flagellalis

Binomial name
- Pilocrocis flagellalis Dognin, 1909

Species of moth

Pilocrocis flagellalis is a moth in the family Crambidae. It was described by Paul Dognin in 1909. It is found in French Guiana.
