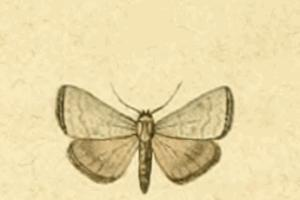
- Hyperlais nemausalis

Scientific classification
- Domain: Eukaryota
- Kingdom: Animalia
- Phylum: Arthropoda
- Class: Insecta
- Order: Lepidoptera
- Family: Crambidae
- Subfamily: Cybalomiinae
- Genus: Hyperlais; Marion, 1959

Synonyms
- Hypolais Guenée, 1854

= Hyperlais =

Genus of moths

Hyperlais is a genus of moths of the family Crambidae.

== Species ==
- Hyperlais argillacealis Zeller, 1847
- Hyperlais conspersalis Mey, 2011
- Hyperlais cruzae (Agenjo, 1953)
- Hyperlais dulcinalis (Treitschke, 1835)
- Hyperlais glyceralis (Staudinger, 1859)
- Hyperlais nemausalis (Duponchel, 1831-1833)
- Hyperlais rivasalis (Vazquez, 1905)
- Hyperlais rosseti Varenne, 2009
- Hyperlais siccalis Guenée, 1854
- Hyperlais squamosa (Hampson, 1913)
- Hyperlais transversalis Mey, 2011
- Hyperlais xanthomista Mey, 2011
