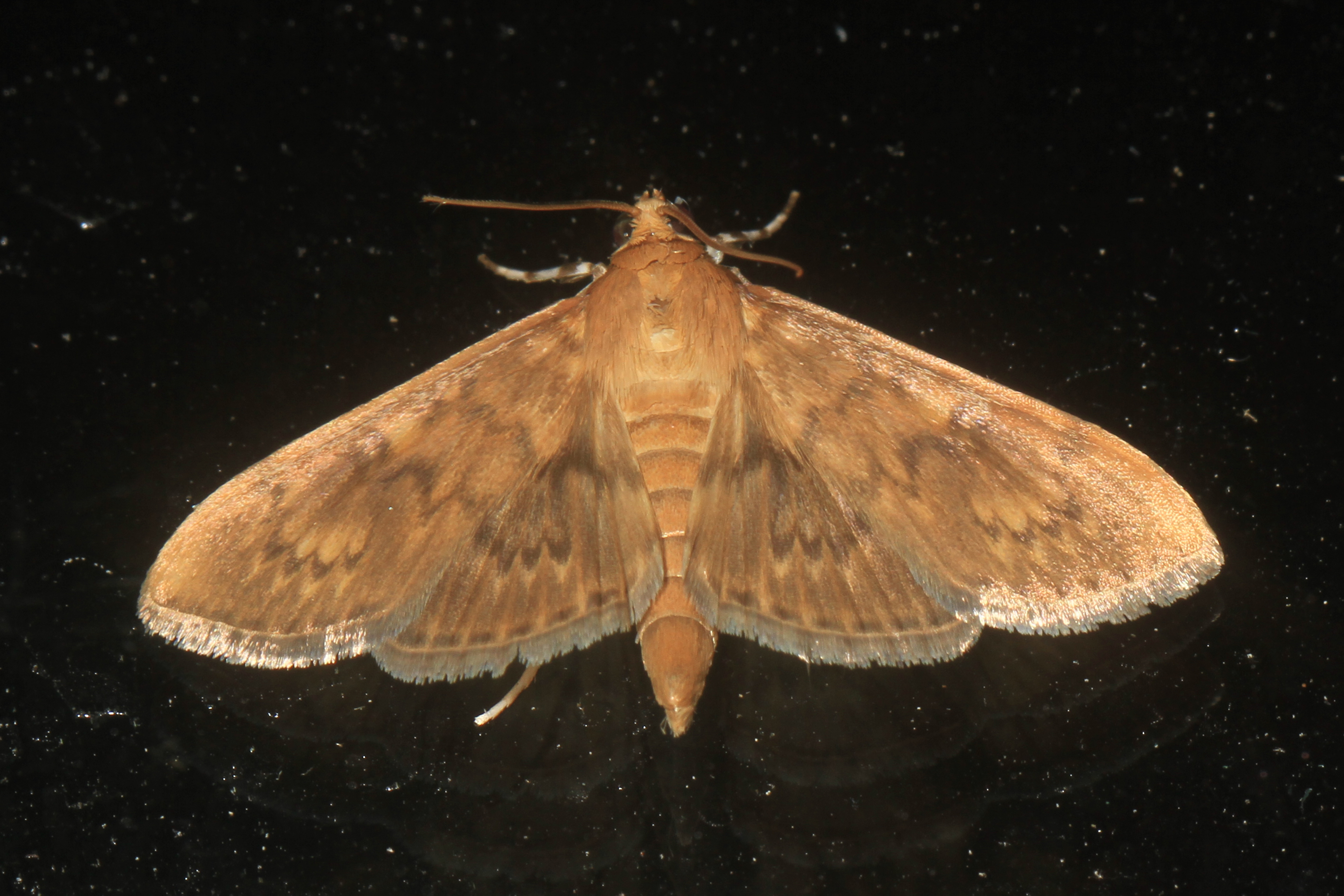

Scientific classification
- Kingdom: Animalia
- Phylum: Arthropoda
- Class: Insecta
- Order: Lepidoptera
- Family: Crambidae
- Genus: Psara
- Species: P. dryalis

Binomial name
- Psara dryalis (Walker, 1859)

Synonyms
- Botys dryalis Walker, 1859

= Psara dryalis =

Species of moth

Psara dryalis is a species of moth in the family Crambidae. It was described by Francis Walker in 1859. It is found in the Dominican Republic, Puerto Rico, Jamaica, Cuba and from the south-western United States to Central America.

The wingspan is about 26 mm. The wings are iridescent with purplish-cinereous interior and exterior lines and blackish marginal spots. Adults have been recorded on wing from July to September in the United States.
