= Pilocrocis rectilinealis =

Scientific classification
- Domain: Eukaryota
- Kingdom: Animalia
- Phylum: Arthropoda
- Class: Insecta
- Order: Lepidoptera
- Family: Crambidae
- Genus: Pilocrocis
- Species: P. rectilinealis

Binomial name
- Pilocrocis rectilinealis (Kenrick, 1917)

Synonyms
- Bocchoris rectilinealis Kenrick, 1917

Species of moth

Pilocrocis rectilinealis is a moth in the family Crambidae. It was described by George Hamilton Kenrick in 1917. It is found on Madagascar.
