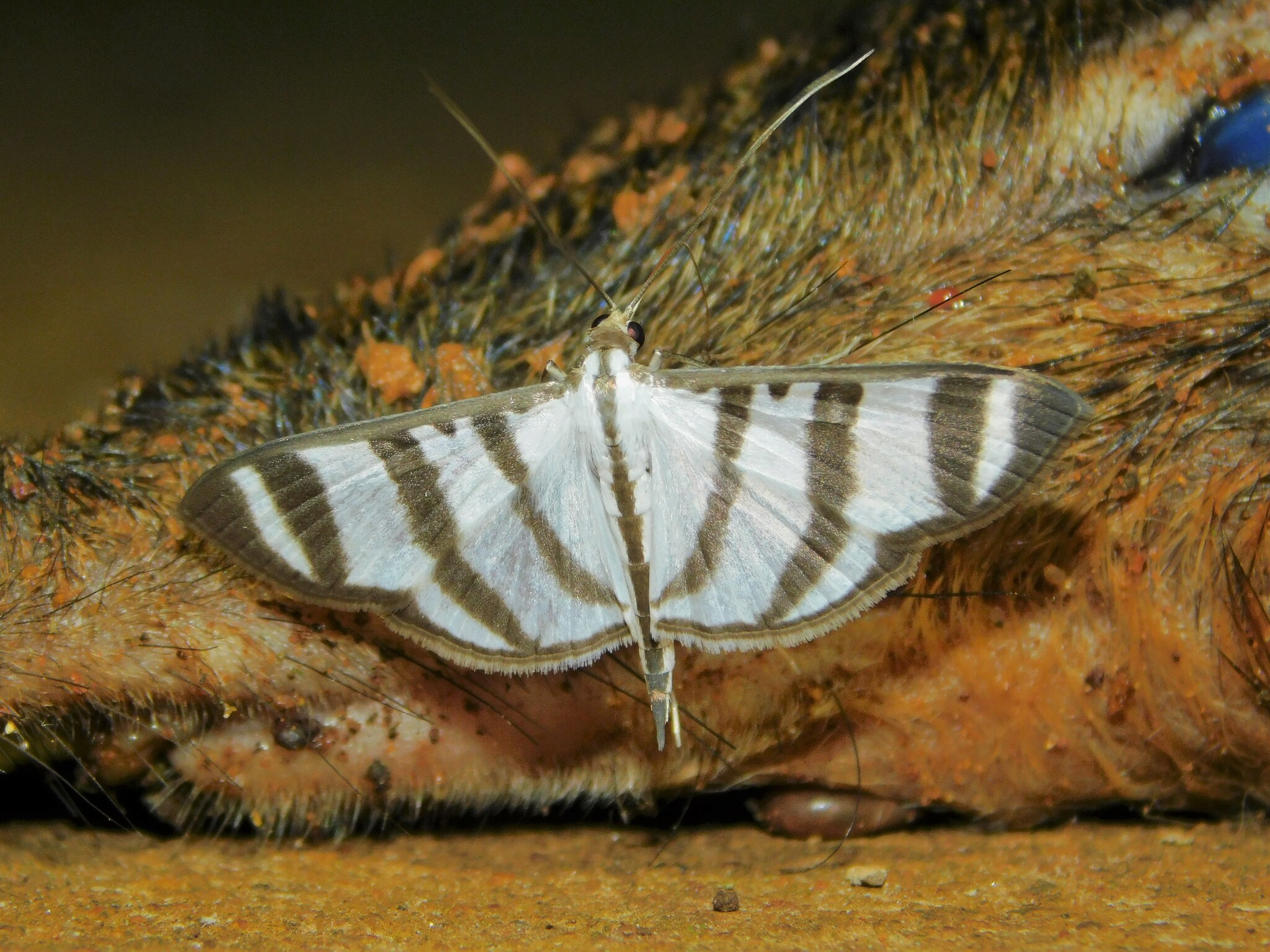
- Feeding on a deceased Chequered sengi

Scientific classification
- Kingdom: Animalia
- Phylum: Arthropoda
- Class: Insecta
- Order: Lepidoptera
- Family: Crambidae
- Genus: Zebronia
- Species: Z. phenice

Binomial name
- Zebronia phenice (Stoll in Cramer & Stoll, 1782)

Synonyms
- Phalaena Pyralis phenice Stoll in Cramer & Stoll, 1782; Zebronia phenice var. mayottensis Pagenstecher, 1907; Phakellura imparivirgalis Mabille, 1881; Spilomela phenicealis Guenée, 1854; Spilomela podalirialis Guenée, 1854; Spilomela podalivalis Klima, 1937; Spilomela podalivalvis Pinhey, 1975; Spilomela trivirgalis Mabille, 1880; Zebronia botydis Strand, 1915; Zebronia foederalis Hübner, 1825; Zebronia lathurusalis Walker, 1859

= Zebronia phenice =

Species of moth

Zebronia phenice is a moth in the family Crambidae. It was described by Stoll in 1782. It is found in Cameroon, Mayotte, the Democratic Republic of Congo, Equatorial Guinea, Ethiopia, Gabon, Ghana, Ivory Coast, Kenya, La Réunion, Madagascar, Mauritius, Mozambique, Nigeria, Senegal, Sierra Leone, South Africa, Tanzania, Gambia, Uganda, Zambia and Zimbabwe.

The larvae feed on Zizyphus mauritiana, Spathodea campanulata, Tecoma and Stenotaphrum species.
