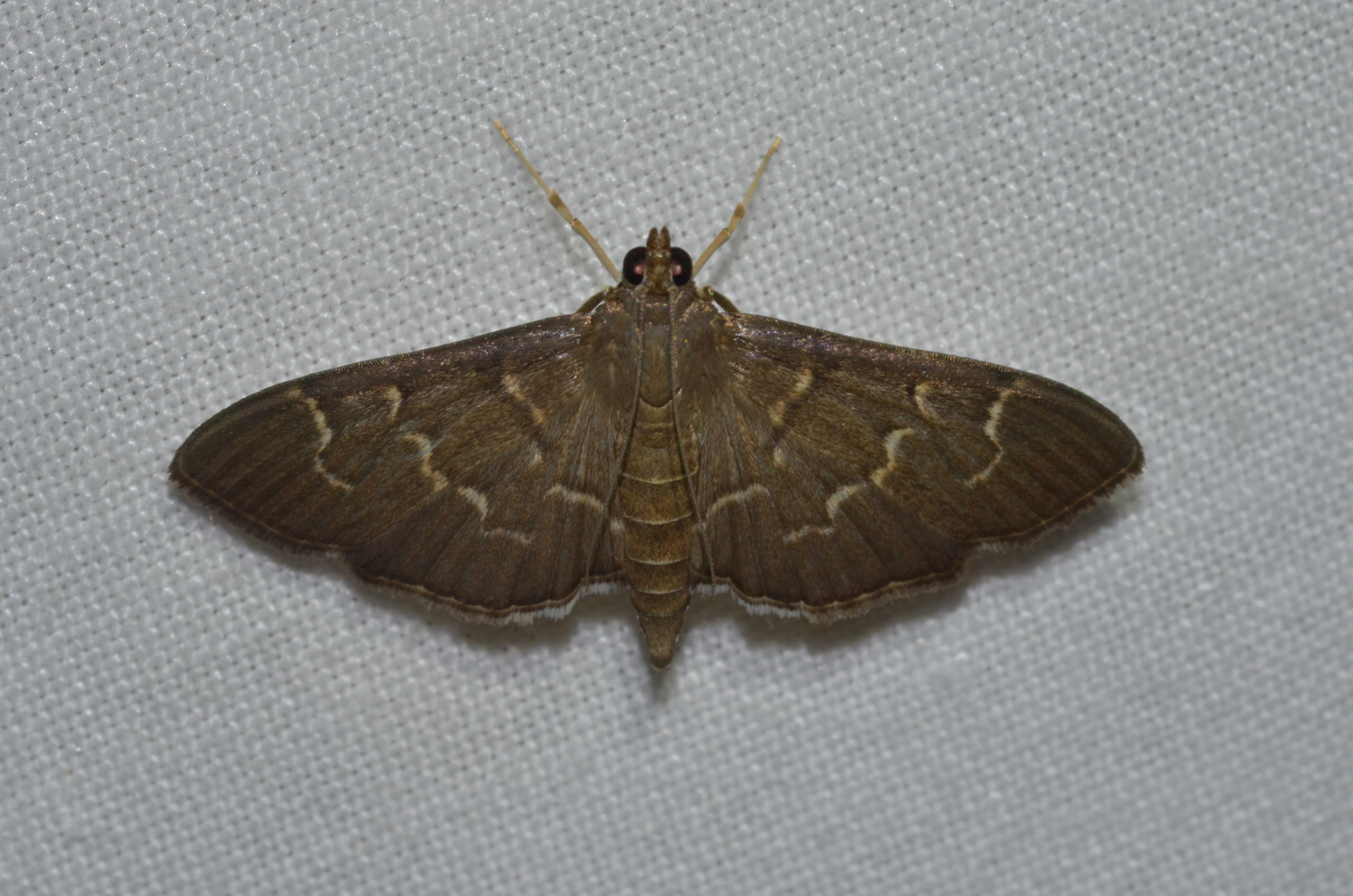

Scientific classification
- Kingdom: Animalia
- Phylum: Arthropoda
- Class: Insecta
- Order: Lepidoptera
- Family: Crambidae
- Genus: Pilocrocis
- Species: P. ramentalis

Binomial name
- Pilocrocis ramentalis Lederer, 1863

Synonyms
- Zinckenia perfuscalis Hulst, 1886

= Pilocrocis ramentalis =

Species of moth

Pilocrocis ramentalis, commonly known as the scraped pilocrocis moth, is a species of moth in the family Crambidae. It was described by Julius Lederer in 1863. It is found in North America, where it has been recorded from Ontario to Florida and from Wisconsin to Texas. Further south, it is found in Mexico, Honduras, Costa Rica, Cuba and Puerto Rico. It is an introduced species on the Galápagos Islands in the Eastern Pacific. The habitat consists of open woods, clearings and damp areas.

== Behaviour and ecology ==
The larvae feed on Boehmeria species (including Boehmeria cylindrica), Odontonema strictum, Pachystachys spicata and Pachystachys coccinea.
