= Pilocrocis dohrnialis =

Scientific classification
- Domain: Eukaryota
- Kingdom: Animalia
- Phylum: Arthropoda
- Class: Insecta
- Order: Lepidoptera
- Family: Crambidae
- Genus: Pilocrocis
- Species: P. dohrnialis

Binomial name
- Pilocrocis dohrnialis E. Hering, 1901

Species of moth

Pilocrocis dohrnialis is a moth in the family Crambidae. It was described by Hering in 1901. It is found in Indonesia (Sumatra).
