= Psara submarginalis =

Scientific classification
- Kingdom: Animalia
- Phylum: Arthropoda
- Class: Insecta
- Order: Lepidoptera
- Family: Crambidae
- Genus: Psara
- Species: P. submarginalis

Binomial name
- Psara submarginalis Caradja, 1925

Species of moth

Psara submarginalis is a species of moth in the family Crambidae. It was described by Aristide Caradja in 1925. It is found in China.
