= Mimudea obvialis =

Scientific classification
- Kingdom: Animalia
- Phylum: Arthropoda
- Class: Insecta
- Order: Lepidoptera
- Family: Crambidae
- Genus: Mimudea
- Species: M. obvialis

Binomial name
- Mimudea obvialis (Hampson, 1913)

Synonyms
- Pionea obvialis Hampson, 1913

Species of moth

Mimudea obvialis is a moth in the family Crambidae. It was described by George Hampson in 1913. It is found in Peru.
