= Pilocrocis melangnatha =

Scientific classification
- Kingdom: Animalia
- Phylum: Arthropoda
- Class: Insecta
- Order: Lepidoptera
- Family: Crambidae
- Genus: Pilocrocis
- Species: P. melangnatha

Binomial name
- Pilocrocis melangnatha Hampson, 1912

Species of moth

Pilocrocis melangnatha is a moth in the family Crambidae. It was described by George Hampson in 1912. It is found in New Guinea.

The wingspan is about 32 mm. The forewings are pale rufous, the costa whitish to towards the apex. There is a subbasal black point above the inner margin. The antemedial line is slight, black and oblique from below the costa to the submedian fold, then slightly incurved. There is a black point in the middle of the cell and the discoidal striga and the postmcdial line is black, highly crenidate and has black points on the inner side at the veins. There is also a terminal series of black striae. The hindwings are pale rufous with an oblique black discoidal bar. The postmedial line is black with black points on its inner side at the veins between veins 5 and 2 and there is a terminal series of black striae.
