= Mimudea impuralis =

Scientific classification
- Kingdom: Animalia
- Phylum: Arthropoda
- Class: Insecta
- Order: Lepidoptera
- Family: Crambidae
- Genus: Mimudea
- Species: M. impuralis

Binomial name
- Mimudea impuralis (Snellen, 1875)

Synonyms
- Cindaphia impuralis Snellen, 1875

Species of moth

Mimudea impuralis is a moth in the family Crambidae. It was described by Snellen in 1875. It is found in Colombia.
