= Pilocrocis cuprescens =

Scientific classification
- Kingdom: Animalia
- Phylum: Arthropoda
- Class: Insecta
- Order: Lepidoptera
- Family: Crambidae
- Genus: Pilocrocis
- Species: P. cuprescens

Binomial name
- Pilocrocis cuprescens Hampson, 1917

Species of moth

Pilocrocis cuprescens is a species of moth in the family Crambidae. It was described by George Hampson in 1917. It is found in Peru.

== Description ==
The wingspan is about 32 mm. The forewings are pale cupreous brown, the costal and terminal areas purplish red brown with a cupreous gloss. There is an indistinct oblique brown antemedial line and a slight brown spot in the middle of the cell, as well as a discoidal lunule with whitish striga in the centre. The postmedial line is brown and there is a fine whitish line at the base of the cilia. The hindwings are pale cupreous brown, the apical area and termen darker brown. There is a brown discoidal bar and the postmedial line is brown.
