= Psara mysticalis =

Scientific classification
- Kingdom: Animalia
- Phylum: Arthropoda
- Class: Insecta
- Order: Lepidoptera
- Family: Crambidae
- Genus: Psara
- Species: P. mysticalis

Binomial name
- Psara mysticalis (Schaus, 1920)

Synonyms
- Sylepta mysticalis Schaus, 1920

Species of moth

Psara mysticalis is a species of moth in the family Crambidae. It was described by Schaus in 1920. It is found in Brazil (Rio de Janeiro).

== Description ==
The wingspan is about 27 mm. There is a fine outbent dark antemedial line on the forewings, as well as a dark point on the discocellular. The postmedial line is fine and dark. The hindwings have a faint postmedial line.
