= Mimudea longipalpalis =

Scientific classification
- Kingdom: Animalia
- Phylum: Arthropoda
- Class: Insecta
- Order: Lepidoptera
- Family: Crambidae
- Genus: Mimudea
- Species: M. longipalpalis

Binomial name
- Mimudea longipalpalis (Hampson, 1903)

Synonyms
- Pionea longipalpalis Hampson, 1903

Species of moth

Mimudea longipalpalis is a moth in the family Crambidae. It was described by George Hampson in 1903. It is found in Kashmir.
