= Pilocrocis fulviflavalis =

Scientific classification
- Kingdom: Animalia
- Phylum: Arthropoda
- Class: Insecta
- Order: Lepidoptera
- Family: Crambidae
- Genus: Pilocrocis
- Species: P. fulviflavalis

Binomial name
- Pilocrocis fulviflavalis Hampson, 1917

Species of moth

Pilocrocis fulviflavalis is a moth in the family Crambidae. It was described by George Hampson in 1917. It is found in Peru.

The wingspan is about 21 mm. The forewings are fulvous yellow, the disk paler yellow and the costal area suffused with brown to the postmedial line and the costal edge is white, except towards the base. The antemedial line is brown and there is a minute black spot in the middle of the cell and discoidal lunule. The postmedial line is brown, blackish towards the costa and there are small black spots just before the termen from the apex to above vein 3. The hindwings are pale yellow, the tenrmen with a slight fulvous tinge except towards the tornus. The postmedial line is brown.
