= Pilocrocis flavicorpus =

Scientific classification
- Kingdom: Animalia
- Phylum: Arthropoda
- Class: Insecta
- Order: Lepidoptera
- Family: Crambidae
- Genus: Pilocrocis
- Species: P. flavicorpus

Binomial name
- Pilocrocis flavicorpus Hampson, 1917

Species of moth

Pilocrocis flavicorpus is a moth in the family Crambidae. It was described by George Hampson in 1917. It is found in Peru.

The wingspan is about 30 mm. The forewings are uniform red brown with a cupreous gloss.
