= Hyperlais siccalis =

Scientific classification
- Kingdom: Animalia
- Phylum: Arthropoda
- Class: Insecta
- Order: Lepidoptera
- Family: Crambidae
- Genus: Hyperlais
- Species: H. siccalis

Binomial name
- Hyperlais siccalis Guenee, 1854

Species of moth

Hyperlais siccalis is a species of moth in the family Crambidae described by Achille Guenée in 1854. It is found in France and Spain.

The wingspan is about 20 mm.
