= Psara frenettalis =

Scientific classification
- Kingdom: Animalia
- Phylum: Arthropoda
- Class: Insecta
- Order: Lepidoptera
- Family: Crambidae
- Genus: Psara
- Species: P. frenettalis

Binomial name
- Psara frenettalis Legrand, 1966

Species of moth

Psara frenettalis is a species of moth in the family Crambidae. It was described by Henry Legrand in 1966. It is found on the Seychelles, where it has been recorded from Mahé.
