= Mimudea pallidalis =

Scientific classification
- Domain: Eukaryota
- Kingdom: Animalia
- Phylum: Arthropoda
- Class: Insecta
- Order: Lepidoptera
- Family: Crambidae
- Genus: Mimudea
- Species: M. pallidalis

Binomial name
- Mimudea pallidalis (South in Leech & South, 1901)

Synonyms
- Pionea pallidalis South in Leech & South, 1901

Species of moth

Mimudea pallidalis is a moth in the family Crambidae. It was described by South in 1901. It is found in China.
