= Pilocrocis hypoleucalis =

Scientific classification
- Kingdom: Animalia
- Phylum: Arthropoda
- Class: Insecta
- Order: Lepidoptera
- Family: Crambidae
- Genus: Pilocrocis
- Species: P. hypoleucalis

Binomial name
- Pilocrocis hypoleucalis Hampson, 1912

Species of moth

Pilocrocis hypoleucalis is a moth in the family Crambidae. It was described by George Hampson in 1912. It is found in Mexico (Tabasco), Panama and Jamaica.

The wingspan is 30–32 mm. The forewings are grey-brown with a slight cupreous gloss, the costal area somewhat darker and there is an indistinct slightly curved antemedial line, as well as a small discoidal spot. There is an indistinct postmedial line. The hindwings are glossy grey-brown, with a slight discoidal spot. There is an indistinct postmedial line.
