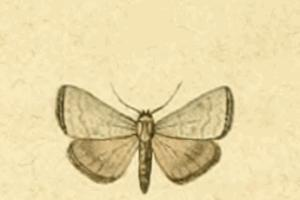

Scientific classification
- Domain: Eukaryota
- Kingdom: Animalia
- Phylum: Arthropoda
- Class: Insecta
- Order: Lepidoptera
- Family: Crambidae
- Genus: Hyperlais
- Species: H. nemausalis

Binomial name
- Hyperlais nemausalis (Duponchel, 1834)

Synonyms
- Botys nemausalis Duponchel, 1834

= Hyperlais nemausalis =

Species of moth

Hyperlais nemausalis is a species of moth in the family Crambidae described by Philogène Auguste Joseph Duponchel in 1834. It is found in France, Spain, Italy and Greece.

The wingspan is 15–18 mm.
