= Mimudea fuscizonalis =

Scientific classification
- Kingdom: Animalia
- Phylum: Arthropoda
- Class: Insecta
- Order: Lepidoptera
- Family: Crambidae
- Genus: Mimudea
- Species: M. fuscizonalis

Binomial name
- Mimudea fuscizonalis (Hampson, 1896)

Synonyms
- Pionea fuscizonalis Hampson, 1896

Species of moth

Mimudea fuscizonalis is a moth in the family Crambidae. It was described by George Hampson in 1896. It is found in Sikkim, India.
