= Pilocrocis lactealis =

Scientific classification
- Kingdom: Animalia
- Phylum: Arthropoda
- Class: Insecta
- Order: Lepidoptera
- Family: Crambidae
- Genus: Pilocrocis
- Species: P. lactealis

Binomial name
- Pilocrocis lactealis Hampson, 1912

Species of moth

Pilocrocis lactealis is a moth in the family Crambidae. It was described by George Hampson in 1912. It is found in Brazil.

The wingspan is about 32 mm. Adults are yellowish white. The costa of the forewings is slightly tinged with fulvous at the base and the veins have slight dark streaks.
