= Mimudea sthennymalis =

Scientific classification
- Kingdom: Animalia
- Phylum: Arthropoda
- Class: Insecta
- Order: Lepidoptera
- Family: Crambidae
- Genus: Mimudea
- Species: M. sthennymalis

Binomial name
- Mimudea sthennymalis (Dyar, 1914)

Synonyms
- Pionea sthennymalis Dyar, 1914

Species of moth

Mimudea sthennymalis is a moth in the family Crambidae. It was described by Harrison Gray Dyar Jr. in 1914. It is found in Panama.
