= Pilocrocis polialis =

Scientific classification
- Domain: Eukaryota
- Kingdom: Animalia
- Phylum: Arthropoda
- Class: Insecta
- Order: Lepidoptera
- Family: Crambidae
- Genus: Pilocrocis
- Species: P. polialis

Binomial name
- Pilocrocis polialis Schaus, 1927

Species of moth

Pilocrocis polialis is a moth in the family Crambidae. It was described by Schaus in 1927. It is found in the Philippines (Luzon).
