= Mimudea chalcochlora =

Scientific classification
- Kingdom: Animalia
- Phylum: Arthropoda
- Class: Insecta
- Order: Lepidoptera
- Family: Crambidae
- Genus: Mimudea
- Species: M. chalcochlora

Binomial name
- Mimudea chalcochlora (Hampson, 1916)

Synonyms
- xenophasma chalcochlora Hampson, 1916

Species of moth

Mimudea chalcochlora is a moth in the family Crambidae. It was described by George Hampson in 1916. It is found in Colombia.
