= Psara cryptolepis =

Scientific classification
- Kingdom: Animalia
- Phylum: Arthropoda
- Class: Insecta
- Order: Lepidoptera
- Family: Crambidae
- Genus: Psara
- Species: P. cryptolepis

Binomial name
- Psara cryptolepis (E. L. Martin, 1956)

Synonyms
- Pachyzancla cryptolepis E. L. Martin, 1956

Species of moth

Psara cryptolepis is a species of moth in the family Crambidae. It was first described by Edward L. Martin in 1956. It is found in Burundi, Ethiopia and Uganda.
