= Pilocrocis plicatalis =

Scientific classification
- Kingdom: Animalia
- Phylum: Arthropoda
- Class: Insecta
- Order: Lepidoptera
- Family: Crambidae
- Genus: Pilocrocis
- Species: P. plicatalis

Binomial name
- Pilocrocis plicatalis Hampson, 1912

Species of moth

Pilocrocis plicatalis is a moth in the family Crambidae. It was described by George Hampson in 1912. It is found in Guyana.

The wingspan is about 34 mm. The forewings are cupreous brown, strongly sprinkled with purple. There are traces of a dark antemedial line and there is a slight dark discoidal bar. The postmedial line is very indistinct. The hindwings are cupreous brown.
