= Psara pertentalis =

Scientific classification
- Kingdom: Animalia
- Phylum: Arthropoda
- Class: Insecta
- Order: Lepidoptera
- Family: Crambidae
- Genus: Psara
- Species: P. pertentalis

Binomial name
- Psara pertentalis (Möschler, 1890)

Synonyms
- Botys pertentalis Möschler, 1890; Psara perpentalis; Pilocrocis portentalis

Species of moth

Psara pertentalis is a species of moth in the family Crambidae. It is found in Puerto Rico and Jamaica.
