= Psara aprepia =

Scientific classification
- Kingdom: Animalia
- Phylum: Arthropoda
- Class: Insecta
- Order: Lepidoptera
- Family: Crambidae
- Genus: Psara
- Species: P. aprepia

Binomial name
- Psara aprepia (Hampson, 1913)

Synonyms
- Pachyzancla aprepia Hampson, 1913

Species of moth

Psara aprepia is a species of moth in the family Crambidae. It was first described by George Hampson in 1913. It is found in Mauritius and Zimbabwe.
