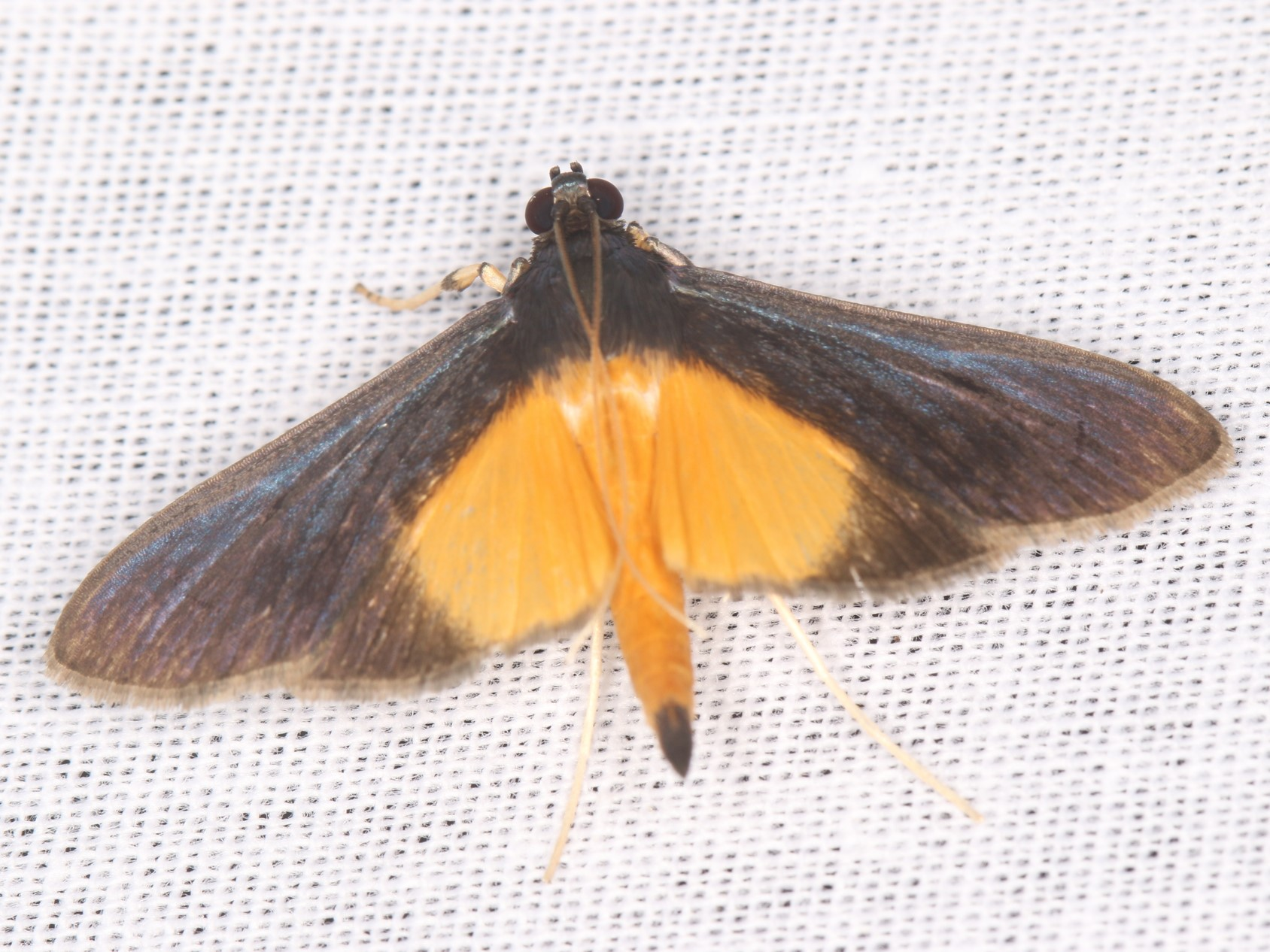

Scientific classification
- Kingdom: Animalia
- Phylum: Arthropoda
- Class: Insecta
- Order: Lepidoptera
- Family: Crambidae
- Genus: Pilocrocis
- Species: P. metachrysias

Binomial name
- Pilocrocis metachrysias Hampson, 1918

= Pilocrocis metachrysias =

Species of moth

Pilocrocis metachrysias is a species of moth in the family Crambidae. It was described by George Hampson in 1918. It is found in Peru.

== Description ==
The wingspan is about 35 mm. The forewings are black brown glossed with silvery blue to beyond the end of the cell and on the inner area to the middle. The rest of the wing is glossed with purple. The hindwings are orange yellow, the terminal area is black brown glossed with purple.
