= Zebronia trilinealis =

Scientific classification
- Kingdom: Animalia
- Phylum: Arthropoda
- Class: Insecta
- Order: Lepidoptera
- Family: Crambidae
- Genus: Zebronia
- Species: Z. trilinealis

Binomial name
- Zebronia trilinealis Walker, 1865

Species of moth

Zebronia trilinealis is a moth in the family Crambidae. It was described by Francis Walker in 1865. It is found in Seram, Indonesia.
