= Psara nigridior =

Scientific classification
- Kingdom: Animalia
- Phylum: Arthropoda
- Class: Insecta
- Order: Lepidoptera
- Family: Crambidae
- Genus: Psara
- Species: P. nigridior

Binomial name
- Psara nigridior Rothschild, 1915

Species of moth

Psara nigridior is a species of moth in the family Crambidae. It was described by Rothschild in 1915. It is found in Papua New Guinea.
