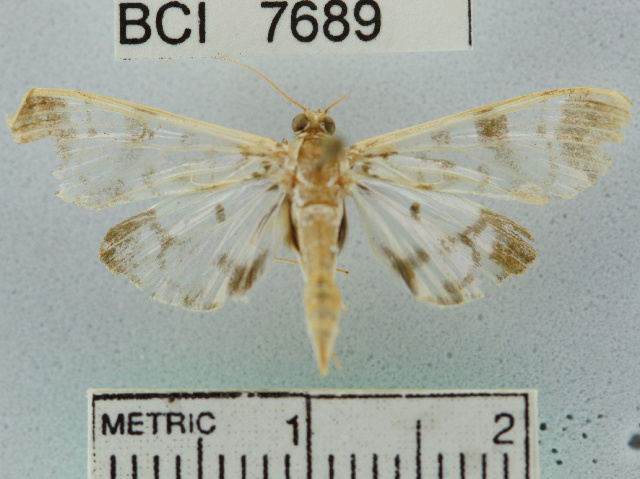

Scientific classification
- Domain: Eukaryota
- Kingdom: Animalia
- Phylum: Arthropoda
- Class: Insecta
- Order: Lepidoptera
- Family: Crambidae
- Genus: Pilocrocis
- Species: P. sororalis

Binomial name
- Pilocrocis sororalis Schaus, 1920

= Pilocrocis sororalis =

Species of moth

Pilocrocis sororalis is a species of moth in the family Crambidae. It was described by William Schaus in 1920. It is found in Panama and Guatemala.

== Description ==
The wingspan is about 34 mm. The forewings are semihyaline white with dark cupreous-brown markings. The costal edge is pale ochreous, the markings not crossing it except the postmedial line. There is a thick broken basal line, a broad subbasal line and a fine antemedial line, as well as a medial spot from above the cell to a black line along the median. The medial spot above the submedian line is connected on the inner margin with the antemedial line by an inbent line. There is a broad fascia across the discocellular space and the postmedial line is narrow and followed by a narrow white line. The rest of the inner margin to the tornus is broadly shaded by dark and there is a large terminal dark space. The hindwings are semihyaline opalescent white.
