= Pilocrocis melastictalis =

Scientific classification
- Kingdom: Animalia
- Phylum: Arthropoda
- Class: Insecta
- Order: Lepidoptera
- Family: Crambidae
- Genus: Pilocrocis
- Species: P. melastictalis

Binomial name
- Pilocrocis melastictalis Hampson, 1912

Species of moth

Pilocrocis melastictalis is a moth in the family Crambidae. It was described by George Hampson in 1912. It is found in South Africa and Zimbabwe.

The wingspan is about 32 mm. The forewings are fuscous brown with an oblique blackish antemedial line bent inwards to the costa and a small black spot in the middle of the cell and a black discoidal lunule. The postmedial line is blackish and there is a slight dark terminal line. The hindwings are greyish brown with a slight black discoidal lunule. The postmedial line is fuscous and there is a slight dark terminal line.
