= Psara glaucalis =

Scientific classification
- Kingdom: Animalia
- Phylum: Arthropoda
- Class: Insecta
- Order: Lepidoptera
- Family: Crambidae
- Genus: Psara
- Species: P. glaucalis

Binomial name
- Psara glaucalis (Hampson, 1912)

Synonyms
- Sylepta glaucalis Hampson, 1912

Species of moth

Psara glaucalis is a species of moth in the family Crambidae. It was described by George Hampson in 1912. It is found in Paraguay.
