= Zebronia virginalis =

Scientific classification
- Kingdom: Animalia
- Phylum: Arthropoda
- Class: Insecta
- Order: Lepidoptera
- Family: Crambidae
- Genus: Zebronia
- Species: Z. virginalis

Binomial name
- Zebronia virginalis Viette, 1958

Species of moth

Zebronia virginalis is a moth in the family Crambidae. It was described by Viette in 1958. It is found on the Comoros, where it has been recorded from Grande Comore.
