= Pilocrocis bastalis =

Scientific classification
- Domain: Eukaryota
- Kingdom: Animalia
- Phylum: Arthropoda
- Class: Insecta
- Order: Lepidoptera
- Family: Crambidae
- Genus: Pilocrocis
- Species: P. bastalis

Binomial name
- Pilocrocis bastalis Schaus, 1920

Species of moth

Pilocrocis bastalis is a species of moth in the family Crambidae. It was described by William Schaus in 1920. It is found in Peru.

== Description ==
The wingspan is about 30 mm. The wings are brown with a cupreous tinge. The forewings have a narrow medial hyaline (glass-like) spot across the cell, and a narrower outbent streak below the cell, as well as a narrower fuscous brown streak on the discocellular. There are three postmedial small hyaline spots forming a slightly incurved line cut by veins 6 and 5, and a smaller spot below vein 4. The hindwings are more thinly scaled at the base and along the inner margin. The postmedial hyaline spots are placed on the forewings and are the same size.
