= Zebronia ornatalis =

Scientific classification
- Kingdom: Animalia
- Phylum: Arthropoda
- Class: Insecta
- Order: Lepidoptera
- Family: Crambidae
- Genus: Zebronia
- Species: Z. ornatalis

Binomial name
- Zebronia ornatalis Leech, 1889

Species of moth

Zebronia ornatalis is a moth in the family Crambidae. It was described by John Henry Leech in 1889. It is found in the Chinese provinces of Zhejiang and Fujian.

The wingspan is about 17 mm. Adults are white, the forewings with three black spots, one of which is on the costa near the base, another on the disc, with one just below it near the inner margin. There is a black central line commencing as a spot on the costa. The submarginal and marginal lines are also black. The underside of the wings is white, sprinkled with darker towards the costa. The markings are as above, but very indistinct.
