= Hyperlais xanthomista =

Scientific classification
- Kingdom: Animalia
- Phylum: Arthropoda
- Clade: Pancrustacea
- Class: Insecta
- Order: Lepidoptera
- Family: Crambidae
- Genus: Hyperlais
- Species: H. xanthomista

Binomial name
- Hyperlais xanthomista Mey, 2011

Species of moth

Hyperlais xanthomista is a species of moth in the family Crambidae described by Wolfram Mey in 2011. It is found in Namibia.
