= Pilocrocis monothyralis =

Scientific classification
- Kingdom: Animalia
- Phylum: Arthropoda
- Class: Insecta
- Order: Lepidoptera
- Family: Crambidae
- Genus: Pilocrocis
- Species: P. monothyralis

Binomial name
- Pilocrocis monothyralis Hampson, 1912

Species of moth

Pilocrocis monothyralis is a moth in the family Crambidae. It was described by George Hampson in 1912. It is found in French Guiana, Guyana, Panama and Jamaica.

The wingspan is about 40 mm. Adults are cupreous brown. The forewings have dark spots in the end of the cell and on the discocellulars, with whitish spots between them. There is an obscure dark postmedial line. The hindwings have a dark discoidal bar and the postmedial line is very indistinct.
