= Mimudea phoenicistis =

Scientific classification
- Kingdom: Animalia
- Phylum: Arthropoda
- Class: Insecta
- Order: Lepidoptera
- Family: Crambidae
- Genus: Mimudea
- Species: M. phoenicistis

Binomial name
- Mimudea phoenicistis (Hampson, 1896)

Synonyms
- Pionea phoenicistis Hampson, 1896

Species of moth

Mimudea phoenicistis is a moth in the family Crambidae. It was described by George Hampson in 1896. It is found in India (Sikkim, Khasi Hills), Bhutan, Myanmar and Thailand.
