= Pilocrocis coptobasis =

Scientific classification
- Kingdom: Animalia
- Phylum: Arthropoda
- Class: Insecta
- Order: Lepidoptera
- Family: Crambidae
- Genus: Pilocrocis
- Species: P. coptobasis

Binomial name
- Pilocrocis coptobasis Hampson, 1899

Species of moth

Pilocrocis coptobasis is a species of moth in the family Crambidae. It was described by George Hampson in 1899. It is found in Indonesia (Ambon Island, Sulawesi, Batchian) and Papua New Guinea, where it has been recorded from the D'Entrecasteaux Islands (Fergusson Island).

== Description ==
The wingspan is about 36 mm. Adults are purplish fuscous, the forewings with a small quadrate hyaline (glass-like) spot in the end of the cell and another below the start of vein 2. The postmedial is formed by three dentate hyaline marks beyond the cell, then three points nearer the termen and a spot near the hyaline spot below vein 2. The postmedial line on the hindwings is represented by a spot beyond the cell, three points near the termen and a line from the lower angle of the cell to the tornus.
