= Hyperlais rosseti =

Scientific classification
- Domain: Eukaryota
- Kingdom: Animalia
- Phylum: Arthropoda
- Class: Insecta
- Order: Lepidoptera
- Family: Crambidae
- Genus: Hyperlais
- Species: H. rosseti

Binomial name
- Hyperlais rosseti Varenne, 2009

Species of moth

Hyperlais rosseti is a species of moth in the family Crambidae described by Thierry Varenne in 2009. It is endemic to France.
