= Psara ferruginalis =

Scientific classification
- Kingdom: Animalia
- Phylum: Arthropoda
- Clade: Pancrustacea
- Class: Insecta
- Order: Lepidoptera
- Family: Crambidae
- Genus: Psara
- Species: P. ferruginalis

Binomial name
- Psara ferruginalis (Saalmüller, 1880)

Synonyms
- Botys ferruginalis Saalmüller 1880

Species of moth

Psara ferruginalis is a species of moth in the family Crambidae described by Max Saalmüller in 1880. It is found on Madagascar and Réunion.

It has a wingspan of 20 mm.

Host plants of this species are Stenotaphrum dimidiatum (Poaceae).
