= Pyrausta quadrimaculalis (Dognin, 1908) =

Scientific classification
- Domain: Eukaryota
- Kingdom: Animalia
- Phylum: Arthropoda
- Class: Insecta
- Order: Lepidoptera
- Family: Crambidae
- Genus: Pyrausta
- Species: P. quadrimaculalis

Binomial name
- Pyrausta quadrimaculalis (Dognin, 1908)

Synonyms
- Mimudea quadrimaculalis Dognin, 1908

Species of moth

Pyrausta quadrimaculalis is a moth in the family Crambidae. It was described by Paul Dognin in 1908. It is found in Argentina.

== Taxonomy ==
The name quadrimaculalis is preoccupied by Pyrausta quadrimaculalis described by South in 1901.
