= Zebronia mahensis =

Scientific classification
- Kingdom: Animalia
- Phylum: Arthropoda
- Class: Insecta
- Order: Lepidoptera
- Family: Crambidae
- Genus: Zebronia
- Species: Z. mahensis

Binomial name
- Zebronia mahensis (T. B. Fletcher, 1910)

Synonyms
- List: Pyrausta mahensis T. B. Fletcher, 1910; Psara mahensis (Fletcher, 1910); Zebronia mariaehelenae Legrand, 1966; Zebronia mariahelenae Maes, 2014

Species of moth

Zebronia mahensis is a species of moth in the family Crambidae. It was first described by Thomas Bainbrigge Fletcher in 1910. It is found on the Seychelles, where it has been recorded from Mahé and Silhouette.
