= Psara ingeminata =

Scientific classification
- Kingdom: Animalia
- Phylum: Arthropoda
- Class: Insecta
- Order: Lepidoptera
- Family: Crambidae
- Genus: Psara
- Species: P. ingeminata

Binomial name
- Psara ingeminata (Meyrick, 1933)

Synonyms
- Pilocrocis ingeminata Meyrick, 1933; Psara duplicatrix Meyrick, 1936

Species of moth

Psara ingeminata is a species of moth in the family Crambidae. It was described by Edward Meyrick in 1933. It is found in the Democratic Republic of the Congo (West Kasai, Katanga, Bas Congo, Equateur).
