= Hyperlais squamosa =

Scientific classification
- Kingdom: Animalia
- Phylum: Arthropoda
- Clade: Pancrustacea
- Class: Insecta
- Order: Lepidoptera
- Family: Crambidae
- Genus: Hyperlais
- Species: H. squamosa

Binomial name
- Hyperlais squamosa (Hampson, 1913)

Synonyms
- Pionea squamosa Hampson, 1913; Cybalomia squamosa

Species of moth

Hyperlais squamosa is a species of moth in the family Crambidae described by George Hampson in 1913. It is found in South Africa.
