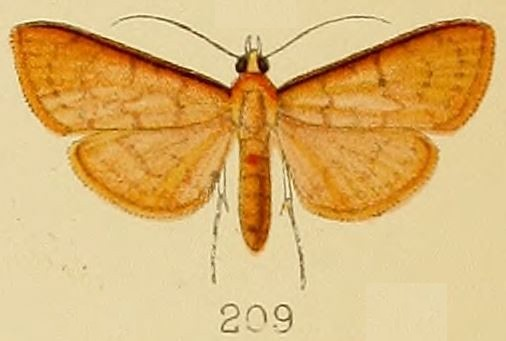

Scientific classification
- Kingdom: Animalia
- Phylum: Arthropoda
- Class: Insecta
- Order: Lepidoptera
- Family: Crambidae
- Genus: Psara
- Species: P. rubricostalis

Binomial name
- Psara rubricostalis Janse, 1924

Synonyms
- Pionea bractealis Kenrick, 1907; Psara bractealis (Kenrick, 1907)

= Psara rubricostalis =

Species of insect

Psara rubricostalis is a species of moth in the family Crambidae described by George Hamilton Kenrick in 1907. It is found in Papua New Guinea.

It has a wingspan of 30 mm.
