= Defense in insects =

Types of defense mechanisms in insects

Insects have a wide variety of predators, including birds, reptiles, amphibians, mammals, carnivorous plants, and other arthropods. The great majority (80–99.99%) of individuals born do not survive to reproductive age, with perhaps 50% of this mortality rate attributed to predation. To deal with this ongoing battle, insects have evolved a wide range of antipredator adaptations. A key restraint on these adaptations is that their cost, in terms of time and energy, does not exceed the benefit that they provide to the organism. The further that a feature tips the balance towards beneficial, the more likely that selection will act upon the trait, passing it down to further generations. The opposite also holds true; defenses that are too costly will have a little chance of being passed down. Examples of defenses include camouflage, escape by flight or running, firmly holding ground to fight, chemical defenses, and social structures that help prevent predation.

== Camouflage ==
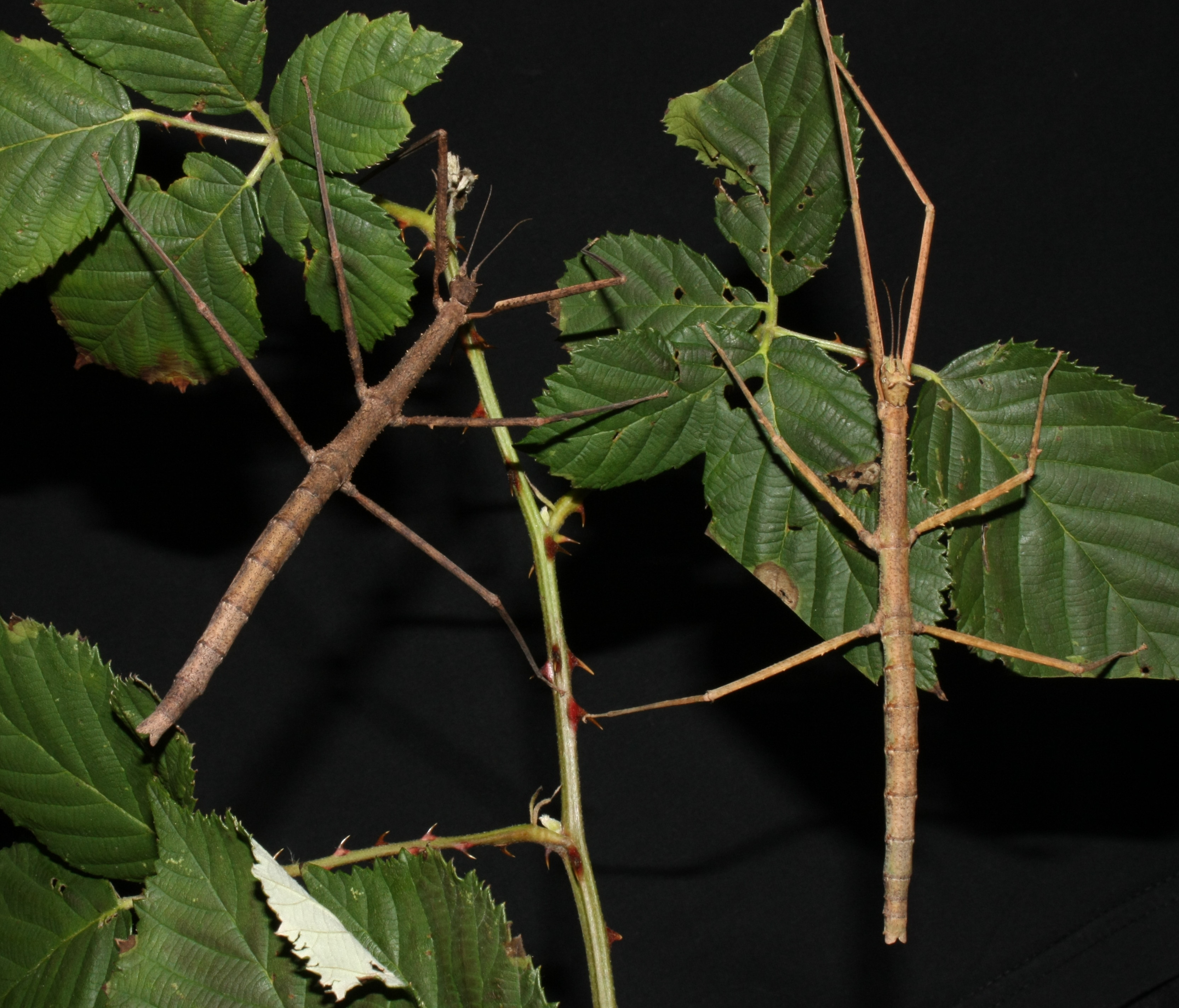
The camouflaged stick insect Medauroidea extradentata

This wavy-lined emerald moth larva with attached plant material not only hides visually but is masked from the chemical sensors on this crab spider's front legs.

Walking sticks (order Phasmatodea), many katydid species (family Tettigoniidae), and moths (order Lepidoptera) are just a few of the insects that have evolved specialized camouflage. This allows them to hide within their environment because of a resemblance to the general background or an inedible object. When an insect looks like an inedible or inconsequential object in the environment that is of no interest to a predator, such as leaves and twigs, it is described as mimesis. Other camouflage mechanisms include resembling a uniformly colored background as well as being light below and dark above, or countershaded. Additionally, camouflage is effective when it results in patterns or unique morphologies that disrupt outlines so as to better merge the individual into the background.

=== Cost and benefit perspective ===
Butterflies (order Lepidoptera) are a good example of the balancing act between the costs and benefits associated with defense. In order to take off, butterflies must have a thorax temperature of 36–40 °C (97–104 °F). This energy is derived both internally through muscles and externally through picking up solar radiation through the body or wings. When looked at in this light, cryptic coloration to escape from predators, markings to attract conspecifics or warn predators (aposematism), and the absence of color to absorb adequate solar radiation, all play key roles in survival. Only when these three affairs are in balance does the butterfly maximize its fitness.

== Mimicry ==
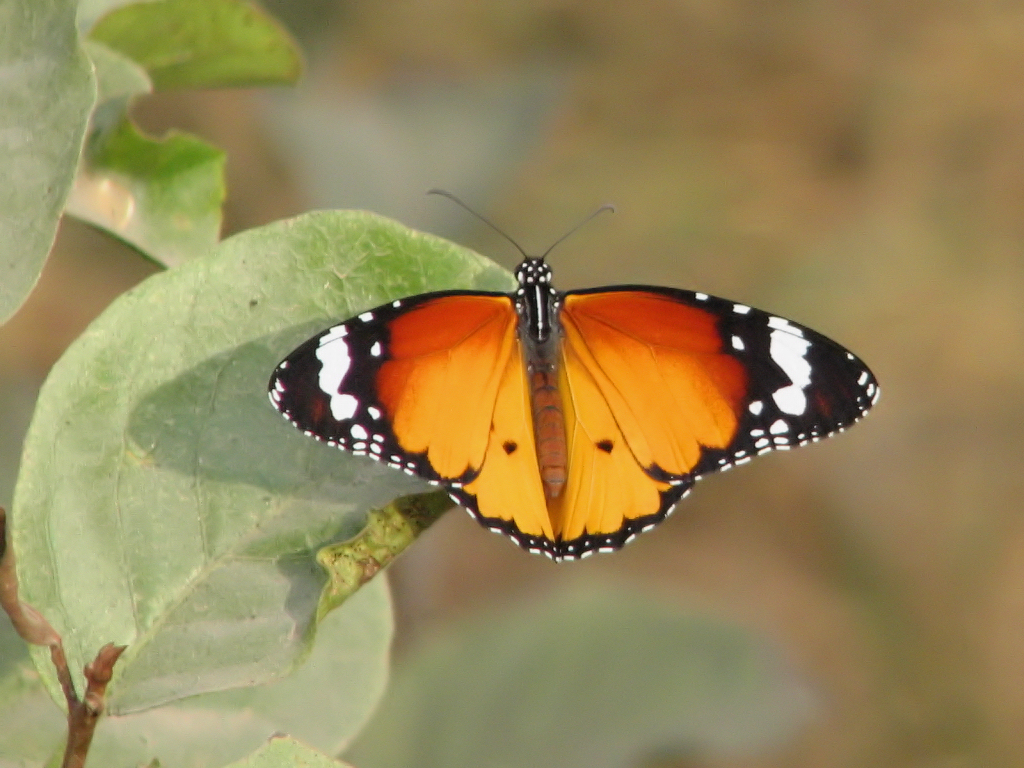
Danaus chrysippus

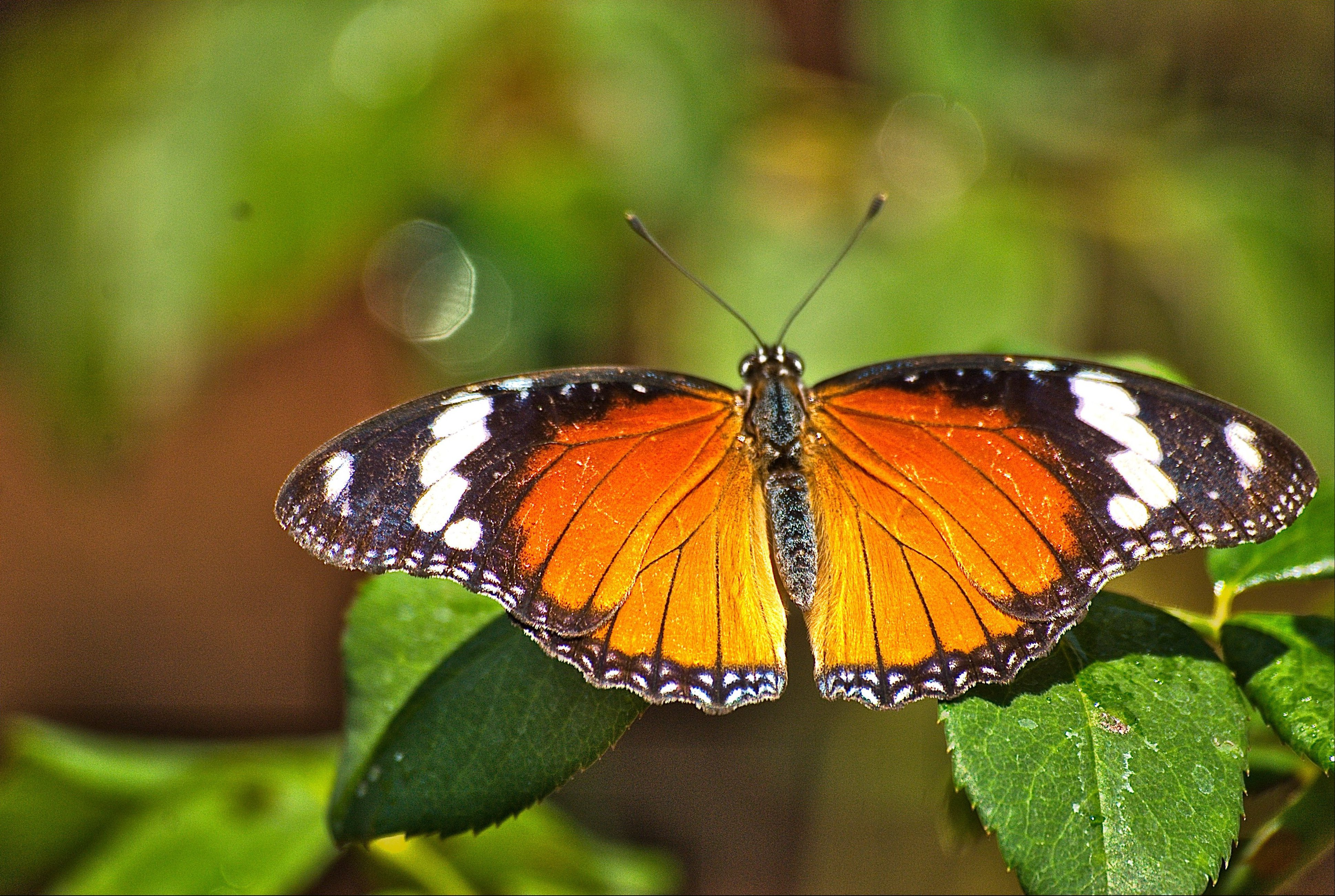
Hypolimnas misippus

Mimicry is a form of defense which describes when a species resembles another recognized by natural enemies, giving it protection against predators. The resemblance among mimics does not denote common ancestry. Mimicry works if and only if predators are able to learn from eating distasteful species. It is a three part system that involves a model species, a mimic of that species, and a predatory observer that acts as a selective agent. If learning is to be successful, then all models, mimics, and predators must co-exist, a notion feasible within the context of geographic sympatry.

Mimicry is divided into two parts, Batesian mimicry and Müllerian mimicry.

=== Batesian mimicry ===
In Batesian mimicry, an aposematic inedible model has an edible mimic. Automimics are individuals that, due to environmental conditions, lack the distasteful or harmful chemicals of conspecifics, but are still indirectly protected through their visibly identical relatives. An example can be found in the plain tiger (Danaus chrysippus), a non-edible butterfly, which is mimicked by multiple species, the most similar being the female danaid eggfly (Hypolimnas misippus).

=== Müllerian mimicry ===
In Müllerian mimicry, a group of species benefit from each other's existence because they all are warningly colored in the same manner and are distasteful. The best examples of this phenomenon can be found within the butterfly genus Heliconius.

== Behavioral responses ==
This Lepidoptera larva disposes of its frass that might attract predators or parasites.

Behavioral responses to escape predation include burrowing into substrate and being active only through part of the day. Furthermore, insects may feign death, a response termed thanatosis. Beetles, particularly weevils, do this frequently. Bright colors may also be flashed underneath cryptic ones. A startle display occurs when prey takes advantage of these markings after being discovered by a predator. The striking color pattern, which often includes eyespots, is intended to evoke prompt enemy retreat. Better formed eyespots seem to result in better deterrence.

== Mechanical defenses ==
Insects have had millions of years to evolve mechanical defenses. Perhaps the most obvious is the cuticle. Although its main role lies in support and muscle attachment, when extensively hardened by the cross-linking of proteins and chitin, or sclerotized, the cuticle acts as a first line of defense. Additional physical defenses include modified mandibles, horns, and spines on the tibia and femur. When these spines take on a main predatory role, they are termed raptorial.

Some insects uniquely create retreats that appear uninteresting or inedible to predators. This is the case in caddisfly larvae (order Trichoptera) which encase their abdomen with a mixture of materials like leaves, twigs, and stones.

== Autotomy ==
Autotomy, or the shedding of appendages, is also used to distract predators, giving the prey a chance to escape. This highly costly mechanism is regularly practiced within stick insects (order Phasmatodea) where the cost is accentuated by the possibility that legs can be lost 20% of the time during molting. Harvestmen (order Opiliones) also use autotomy as a first line of defense against predators.

== Chemical defenses ==
The banded orb weaving spider wraps up a large milkweed bug and subsequently cuts it from its web. This illustrates the protection the bug gained from feeding on milkweed.

Unlike pheromones, allomones, defensive chemicals, harm the receiver at the benefit of the producer. This grouping encompasses the chemical arsenal that numerous insects employ. Insects with chemical weaponry usually make their presence known through aposematism. Aposematism is utilized by non-palatable species as a warning to predators that they represent a toxic danger. Additionally, these insects tend to be relatively large, long-lived, active, and frequently aggregate. Indeed, longer-lived insects are more likely to be chemically defended than short lived ones, as longevity increases apparency.

In the insect realm, chemical defenses are quite unevenly distributed. There is great variation in the presence and absence of chemical arms among orders and families to even within families. Moreover, there is diversity among insects as to whether the defensive compounds are obtained intrinsically or extrinsically. Many compounds are derived from the main food source of insect larvae, and occasionally adults, feed, whereas other insects are able to synthesize their own toxins.

In reflex bleeding, insects dispel their blood, hemolymph, or a mixture of exocrine secretions and blood as a defensive maneuver. The discharged blood may contain toxins produced within the insect source or externally from plants that the insect consumed.

Chemical defenses fall into two classes. Class I chemicals irritate, injure, poison, or drug individual predators. They can be further separated into immediate or delayed substances, depending on the amount of time it takes to feel their effects. Immediate substances are encountered topographically when a predator handles the insect while delayed chemicals, which are generally contained within the insect's tissues, induce vomiting and blistering. Class II chemicals are essentially harmless. They stimulate scent and taste receptors so as to discourage feeding. They are volatile and reactive, including acids, aldehydes, aromatic ketones, quinones, and terpenes. Furthermore, they may be aposematic, indicating through odors the presence of chemical defenses. Insects may use combinations of the two.

Pasteels, Grégoire, and Rowell-Rahier grouped chemical defenses into three types: compounds that are truly poisonous, those that restrict movement, and those that repel predators. True poisons, essentially Class I compounds, interfere with specific physiological processes or act at certain sites. Repellents irritate the chemical sensitivity of predators. Impairment of movement and sense organs is achieved through sticky, slimy, or entangling secretions that act mechanically rather than chemically. This last grouping of chemicals has both Class I and Class II properties. Some chemicals can have multiple effects.

== Collective defenses in social insects ==
Many chemically defended insect species take advantage of clustering over solitary confinement. Among some insect larvae in the orders Coleoptera and Hymenoptera, cycloalexy is adopted. Either the heads or ends of the abdomen, depending on where noxious compounds are secreted, make up the circumference of a circle. The remaining larvae lie inside this defensive ring where the defenders repel predators through threatening attitudes, regurgitation, and biting.

Termites (order Isoptera), like eusocial ants, wasps, and bees, rely on a caste system to protect their nests. The evolution of fortress defense is closely linked to the specialization of soldier mandibles. Soldiers can have biting-crushing, biting-cutting, cutting, symmetrical snapping, and asymmetrical snapping mandibles. These mandibles may be paired with frontal gland secretion, although snapping soldiers rarely utilize chemical defenses. Termites take advantage of their modified mandibles in phragmosis, which is the blocking of the nest with any part of the body; in this case of termites, nest entrances are blocked by the heads of soldiers.

Some species of bee, mainly that of the genus Trigona, also exhibit such aggressive behavior. The Trigona fuscipennis species in particular, make use of attraction, landing, buzzing and angular flights as typical alarm behaviors. But biting is the prominent form of defense among T. fuscipennis bees and involve their strong, sharp five-toothed mandibles. T. fuscipennis bees have been discovered to engage in suicidal biting in order to defend the nest and against predators. Humans standing in the vicinity of nests are almost always attacked and experience painful bites. The bees also crawl over the intruder into the ears, eye, mouth, and other cavities. The Trigona workers give a painful and persistent bite, are difficult to remove, and usually die during the attack.

Alarm pheromones warn members of a species of approaching danger. Because of their altruistic nature, they follow the rules of kin selection. They can elicit both aggregational and dispersive responses in social insects depending on the alarm caller's location relative to the nest. Closer to the nest, it causes social insects to aggregate and may subsequently produce an attack against the threat. The Polistes canadensis, a primitively eusocial wasp, will emit a chemical alarm substance at the approach of a predator, which will lower their nestmates' thresholds for attack, and even attract more nestmates to the alarm. The colony is thus able to rise quickly with its sting chambers open to defend its nest against predators. In nonsocial insects, these compounds typically stimulate dispersal regardless of location. Chemical alarm systems are best developed in aphids and treehoppers (family Membracidae) among the nonsocial groups. Alarm pheromones take on a variety of compositions, ranging from terpenoids in aphids and termites to acetates, an alcohol, and a ketone in honey bees to formic acid and terpenoids in ants.

== Immunity ==
Insects, like nearly every other organism, are subject to infectious diseases caused by viruses, bacteria, fungi, protozoa, and nematodes. These encounters can kill or weaken the insect. Insects protect themselves against these detrimental microorganisms in two ways. Firstly, the body-enveloping chitin cuticle, in conjunction with the tracheal system and the gut lining, serve as major physical barriers to entry. Secondly, hemolymph itself plays a key role in repairing external wounds as well as destroying foreign organisms within the body cavity. Insects, along with having passive immunity, also show evidence of acquired immunity.

Social insects additionally have a repertoire of behavioural and chemical "border-defences" and in the case of the ant, groom venom or metapleural gland secretions over their cuticle.

== Role of phenotypic plasticity ==
Phenotypic plasticity is the capacity of a single genotype to exhibit a range of phenotypes in response to variation in the environment. For example, in Nemoria arizonaria caterpillars, the cryptic pattern changes according to season and is triggered by dietary cues. In the spring, the first brood of caterpillars resembles oak catkins, or flowers. By the summer when the catkins have fallen, the caterpillars discreetly mimic oak twigs. No intermediate forms are present in this species, although other members of the genus Nemoria, such as N. darwiniata, do exhibit transitional forms.

In social insects such as ants and termites, members of different castes develop different phenotypes. For example, workers are normally smaller with less pronounced mandibles than soldiers. This type of plasticity is more so determined by cues, which tend to be non-harmful stimuli, than by the environment.

Phenotypic plasticity is important because it allows an individual to adapt to a changing environment and can ultimately alter their evolutionary path. It not only plays an indirect role in defense as individuals prepare themselves physically to take on the task of avoiding predation through camouflage or developing collective mechanical traits to protect a social hive, but also a direct one. For example, cues elicited from a predator, which may be visual, acoustic, chemical, or vibrational, may cause rapid responses that alter the prey's phenotype in real time.

== See also ==
- Insect ecology
- Antipredator adaptation
- Behavioral ecology
