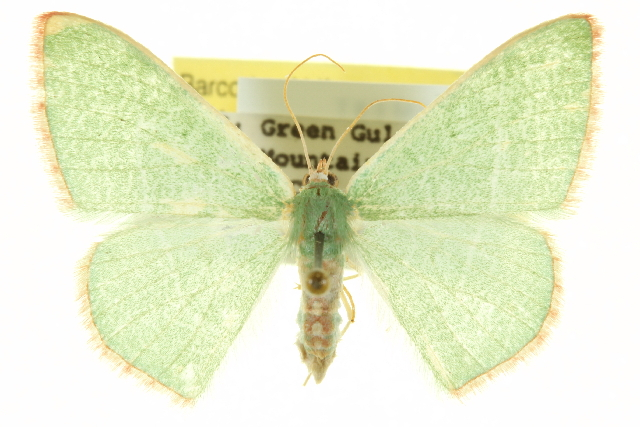

Scientific classification
- Kingdom: Animalia
- Phylum: Arthropoda
- Class: Insecta
- Order: Lepidoptera
- Family: Geometridae
- Genus: Nemoria
- Species: N. albilineata

Binomial name
- Nemoria albilineata Cassino, 1927

= Nemoria albilineata =

Species of moth

Nemoria albilineata is a geometer moth in the Geometridae family of butterflies and moths (order Lepidoptera). The scientific name of the species was first validly published in 1927 by Cassino, and is provisionally accepted. The Bug Guide website suggests that this species is the same as Nemoria festaria and this has been moved to Nemoria intensaria.
