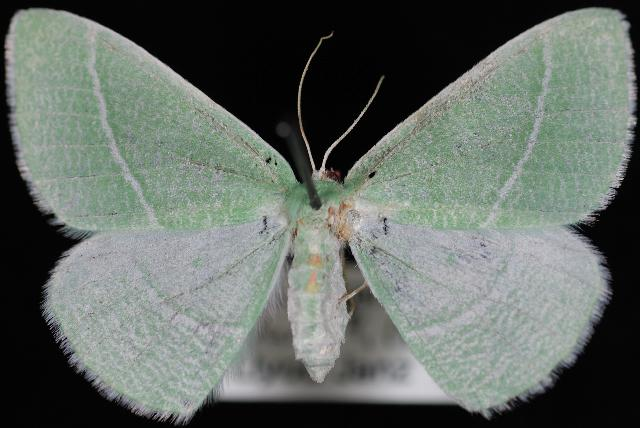

Scientific classification
- Kingdom: Animalia
- Phylum: Arthropoda
- Class: Insecta
- Order: Lepidoptera
- Family: Geometridae
- Tribe: Nemoriini
- Genus: Chlorosea
- Species: C. nevadaria

Binomial name
- Chlorosea nevadaria Packard, 1873

Synonyms
- Chlorosea proutaria Pearsall, 1911

= Chlorosea nevadaria =

Species of moth

Chlorosea nevadaria is a species of emerald moth in the family Geometridae. It is found in North America. It is associated with Arctostaphylos patula in adulthood.

The MONA or Hodges number for Chlorosea nevadaria is 7012.
