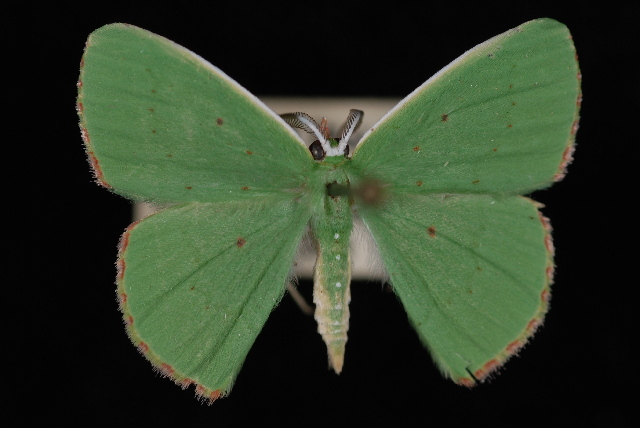

Scientific classification
- Domain: Eukaryota
- Kingdom: Animalia
- Phylum: Arthropoda
- Class: Insecta
- Order: Lepidoptera
- Family: Geometridae
- Tribe: Nemoriini
- Genus: Phrudocentra
- Species: P. centrifugaria

Binomial name
- Phrudocentra centrifugaria (Herrich-Schäffer, 1870)

= Phrudocentra centrifugaria =

Species of moth

Phrudocentra centrifugaria is a species of emerald moth in the family Geometridae. It is found in the Caribbean Sea and North America.

The MONA or Hodges number for Phrudocentra centrifugaria is 7051.

== Subspecies ==
These five subspecies belong to the species Phrudocentra centrifugaria:

- Phrudocentra centrifugaria centrifugaria
- Phrudocentra centrifugaria heterospila Hampson, 1904
- Phrudocentra centrifugaria impunctata Warren, 1909
- Phrudocentra centrifugaria punctata Warren, 1904
- Phrudocentra centrifugaria stellataria Möschler, 1886
