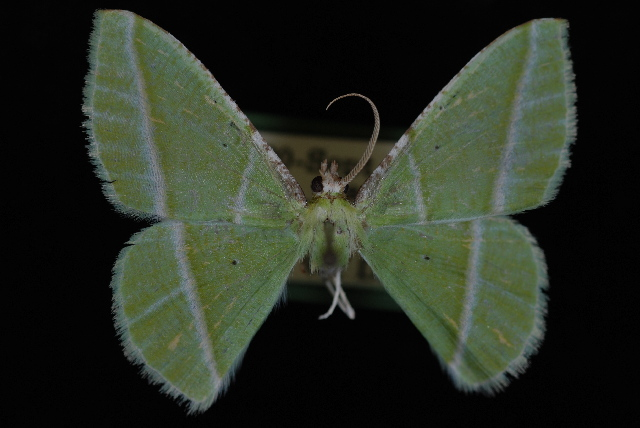

Scientific classification
- Domain: Eukaryota
- Kingdom: Animalia
- Phylum: Arthropoda
- Class: Insecta
- Order: Lepidoptera
- Family: Geometridae
- Tribe: Nemoriini
- Genus: Dichorda
- Species: D. consequaria

Binomial name
- Dichorda consequaria (H. Edwards, 1884)

= Dichorda consequaria =

Species of moth

Dichorda consequaria is a species of emerald moth in the family Geometridae. It is found in Central America and North America.

The MONA or Hodges number for Dichorda consequaria is 7054.

== Subspecies ==
These two subspecies belong to the species Dichorda consequaria:

- Dichorda consequaria consequaria
- Dichorda consequaria perpendiculata Warren, 1904
