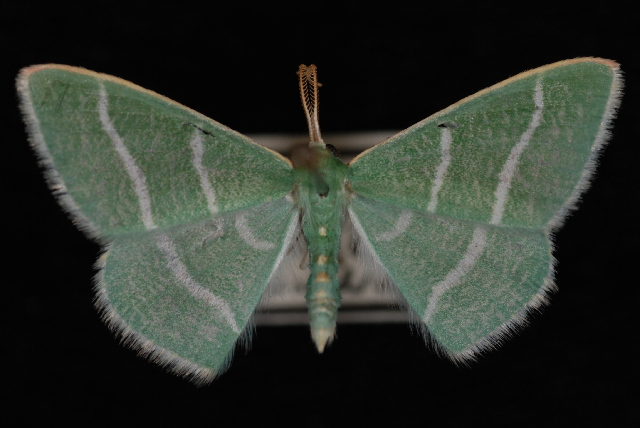

Scientific classification
- Kingdom: Animalia
- Phylum: Arthropoda
- Clade: Pancrustacea
- Class: Insecta
- Order: Lepidoptera
- Family: Geometridae
- Tribe: Nemoriini
- Genus: Nemoria
- Species: N. caerulescens

Binomial name
- Nemoria caerulescens Prout in Wytsman, 1912

= Nemoria caerulescens =

Species of moth

Nemoria caerulescens is a species of emerald moth in the family Geometridae. It is found in North America.

The MONA or Hodges number for Nemoria caerulescens is 7042.
