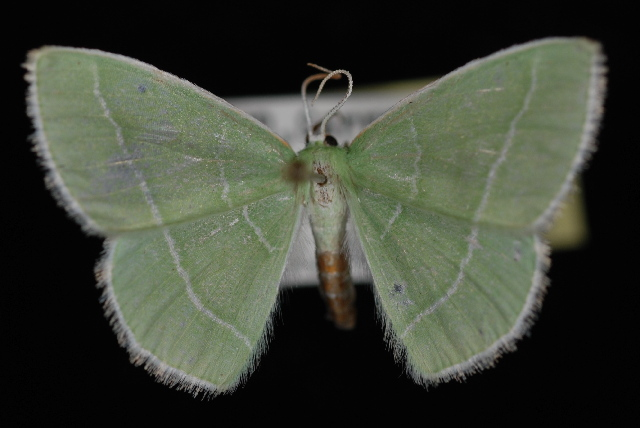

Scientific classification
- Kingdom: Animalia
- Phylum: Arthropoda
- Class: Insecta
- Order: Lepidoptera
- Family: Geometridae
- Tribe: Nemoriini
- Genus: Nemoria
- Species: N. tuscarora

Binomial name
- Nemoria tuscarora Ferguson, 1969

= Nemoria tuscarora =

Species of moth

Nemoria tuscarora is a species of emerald moth in the family Geometridae. It is found in North America.
