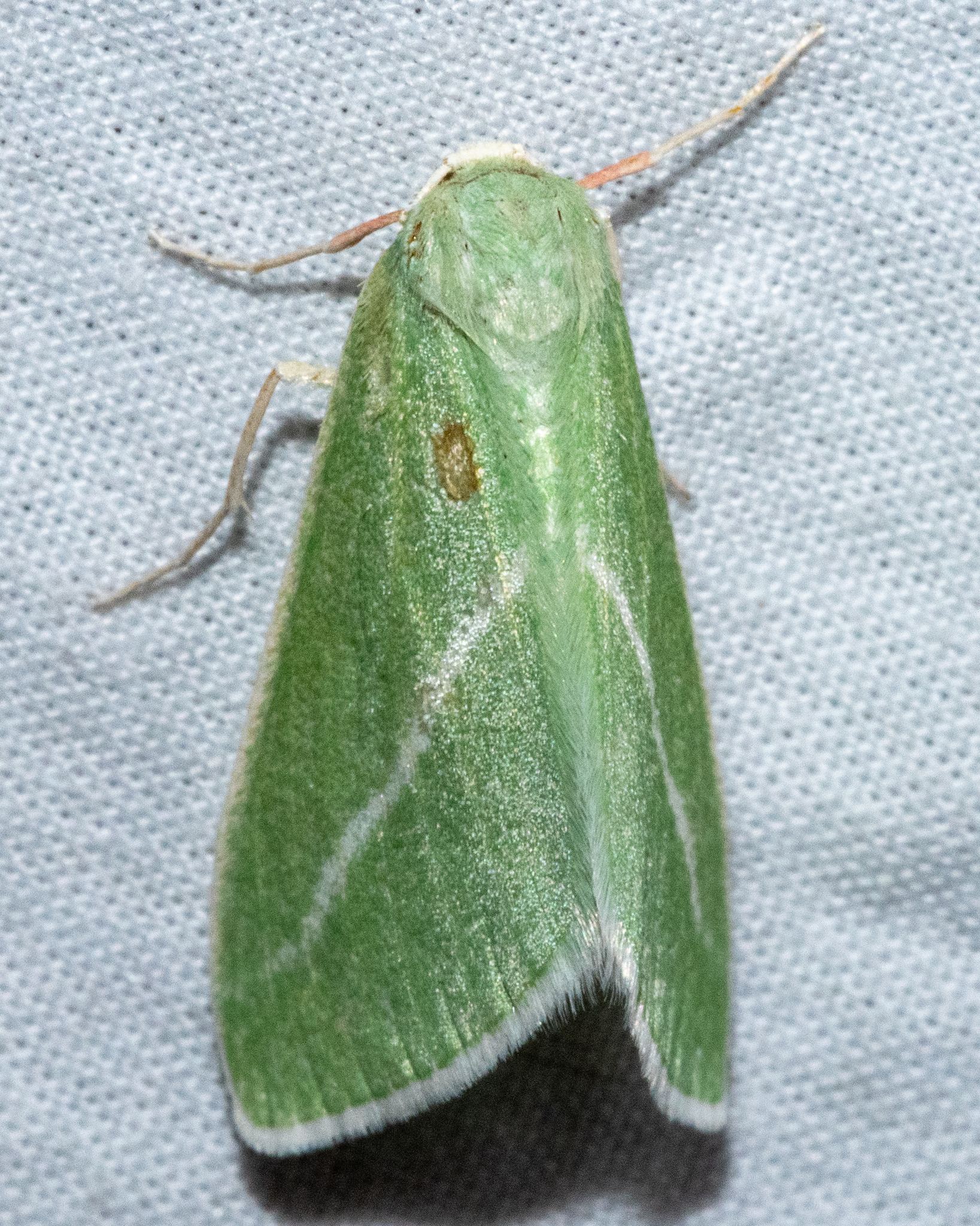

Scientific classification
- Domain: Eukaryota
- Kingdom: Animalia
- Phylum: Arthropoda
- Class: Insecta
- Order: Lepidoptera
- Family: Geometridae
- Tribe: Nemoriini
- Genus: Chlorosea
- Species: C. margaretaria

Binomial name
- Chlorosea margaretaria Sperry, 1944

= Chlorosea margaretaria =

Species of moth

Chlorosea margaretaria is a species of emerald moth in the family Geometridae. It is found in North America.
