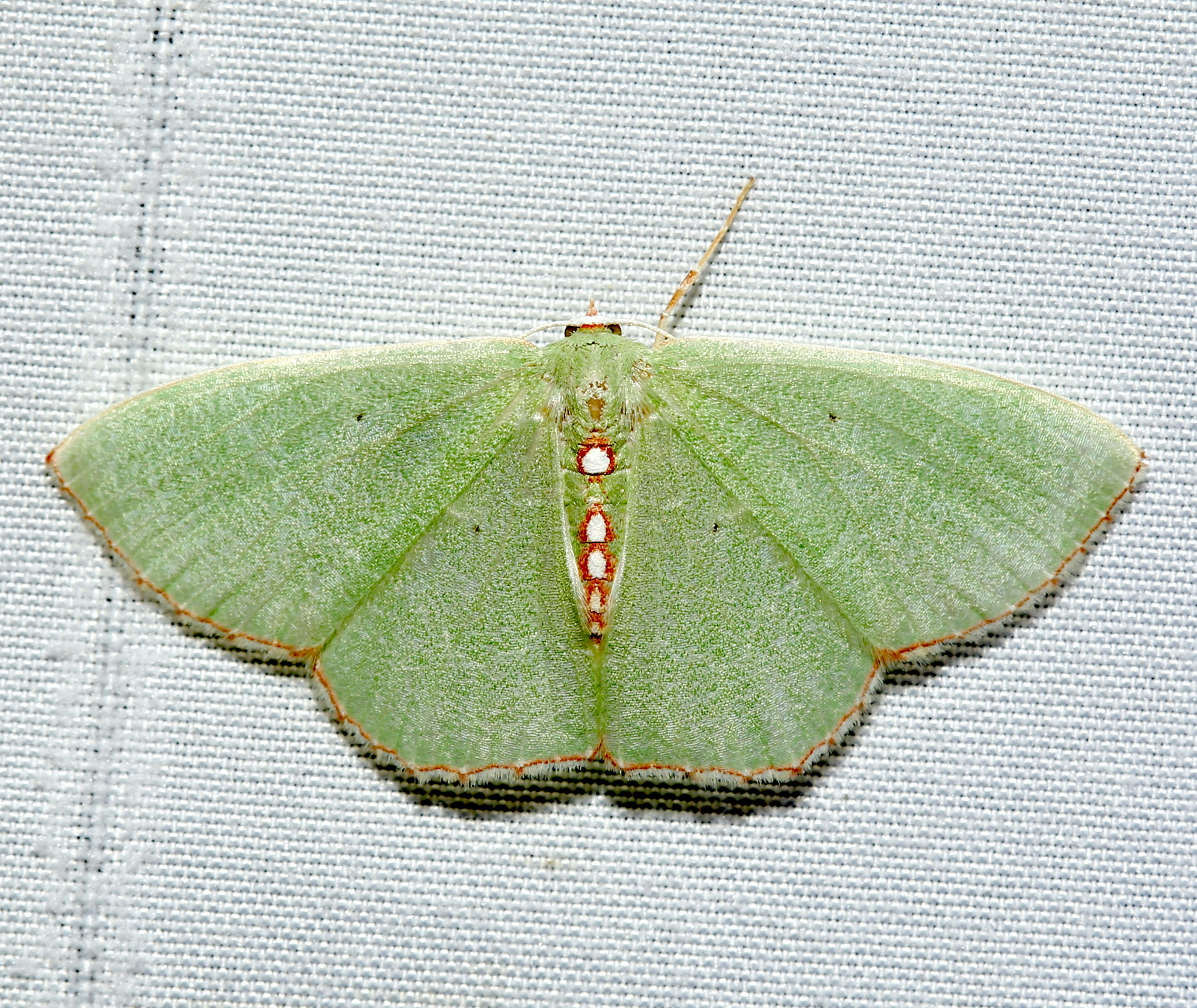

Scientific classification
- Kingdom: Animalia
- Phylum: Arthropoda
- Clade: Pancrustacea
- Class: Insecta
- Order: Lepidoptera
- Family: Geometridae
- Tribe: Nemoriini
- Genus: Nemoria
- Species: N. lixaria

Binomial name
- Nemoria lixaria (Guenée in Boisduval & Guenée, 1858)

= Nemoria lixaria =

Species of moth

Nemoria lixaria, the red-bordered emerald, is a species of emerald moth in the family Geometridae. It is found in North America.
