= Nemoria latirosaria =

Scientific classification
- Domain: Eukaryota
- Kingdom: Animalia
- Phylum: Arthropoda
- Class: Insecta
- Order: Lepidoptera
- Family: Geometridae
- Tribe: Nemoriini
- Genus: Nemoria
- Species: N. latirosaria

Binomial name
- Nemoria latirosaria (Pearsall, 1906)

Species of moth

Nemoria latirosaria is a species of emerald moth in the family Geometridae. It is found in North America.

The MONA or Hodges number for Nemoria latirosaria is 7019.
