= Silana farinosa =

Scientific classification
- Kingdom: Animalia
- Phylum: Arthropoda
- Clade: Pancrustacea
- Class: Insecta
- Order: Coleoptera
- Suborder: Polyphaga
- Infraorder: Cucujiformia
- Family: Chrysomelidae
- Subfamily: Cassidinae
- Tribe: Cassidini
- Genus: Silana; Spaeth, 1914
- Species: S. farinosa

Binomial name
- Silana farinosa (Boheman, 1856)

Species of beetle

Silana farinosa, commonly known as curry-leaf tortoise beetle, is a species of leaf beetle native to Indo-China, India, Sri Lanka, Thailand and introduced to Peninsular Malaysia.

== Description ==
Female is larger than male. Adult female is about 7.5 mm long and male is about 6.5 mm. Body globular and tortoise-like. Body color pale yellow when freshly hatched from eggs, but gradually turns dark brown few hours after moulting. With time, beetle becomes whitish after completely covered with a waxy deposit. Head flattened and hypognathous. Eyes elongate oval. Antennae with 11 segments. Prothorax extended over head. Prothorax is trapezoidal. Scutellum triangular. Elytral apex smooth, shiny and without punctures. Ventrum impunctate with fine hairs.

Eggs which are 5 mm long are spindle-shaped where the dorsum reddish brown and ventrum brownish orange. There are five larval instars stages of the grub. Larva is elongated with tapering forked end. There are about 8 thoracic pairs of spines, and 8 abdominal pairs of spines. Early instar grub is yellowish green and final instar grub is greenish black. Head, legs, prothorax, and dorsum of ninth abdominal segment are blackish. There are three pairs of lateral ocelli and a pair of knob-like antennae. Prothorax has two shiny black patches dorsally and two pairs of spinulate projections. Mesothorax has three pairs of projections ad metathorax with two pairs of projections. Abdomen has nine segments. Average length of the final instar is about 10 mm. Pupa is about 7 mm long, and light brown in color.

== Biology ==
The average lifespan of the adult is about 45 days. One week after emergence, adults start to mate. Mating lasts for about one hour. Two weeks after mating, adult female lays eggs within 30 minutes. Eggs are laid in clusters of about 12 eggs. Then female secreted a colorless secretion around the eggs which later turns to brownish shiny dome shaped ootheca. Ootheca is about 3 mm in diameter, which is firmly attached lower surface of young leaves. Incubation period is about 5 to 6 days. A single female is known to lay about 30 to 40 eggs in 3 to 4 ootheca during her lifetime.

In larva, abdomen consists with a long anal tube and a urogomphi, both are bent upward. This urogomphi is used to excrete feces. During each moulting, cuticle is partially shed by leaving the exuviae together with the feces. This is visible as a black ball over the body. Early instar grubs are leaf miners and show gregarious behavior called cycloalexy. Fourth instar forms small groups of two or three individuals. Pupation began with one day of pre-pupal period. Pupal case is made of exuviae and feces. Pupal period is about 5 to 6 days.

Host plants are Murraya koenigii. Larvae scrape the leaf epidermis by leaving a thin upper membrane. Adult show more extensive damage by feeding on the entire leaves. Leaves turned to yellow with heavy infestations. Due to heavy infestation, defoliation occurs and plant shows stunted growth.

Major predators of larva and pupa are garden lizard, yellow-vented bulbul, Oriental magpie-robin and Bornean queenless ant. Other predators include: Cantheconidea and the parasitoid Brachymeria.
