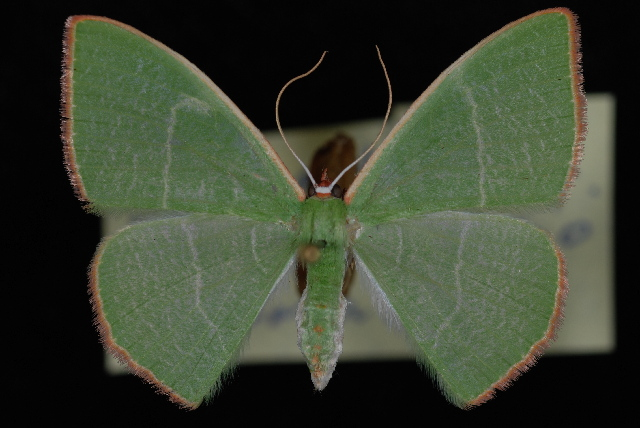

Scientific classification
- Domain: Eukaryota
- Kingdom: Animalia
- Phylum: Arthropoda
- Class: Insecta
- Order: Lepidoptera
- Family: Geometridae
- Tribe: Nemoriini
- Genus: Nemoria
- Species: N. leptalea

Binomial name
- Nemoria leptalea Ferguson, 1969

= Nemoria leptalea =

Species of moth

Nemoria leptalea is a species of emerald moth in the family Geometridae. It is found in Central America and North America.

The MONA or Hodges number for Nemoria leptalea is 7041.
