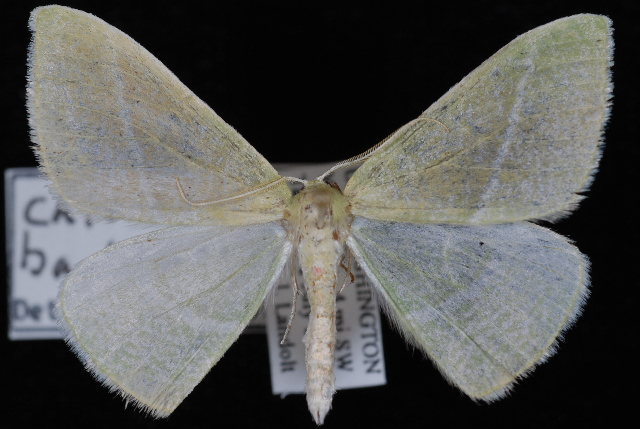

Scientific classification
- Kingdom: Animalia
- Phylum: Arthropoda
- Clade: Pancrustacea
- Class: Insecta
- Order: Lepidoptera
- Family: Geometridae
- Tribe: Nemoriini
- Genus: Chlorosea
- Species: C. banksaria

Binomial name
- Chlorosea banksaria Sperry, 1944

= Chlorosea banksaria =

Species of moth

Chlorosea banksaria, or Bank's emerald moth, is a species of emerald moth in the family Geometridae. It is found in North America.

The MONA or Hodges number for Chlorosea banksaria is 7013.

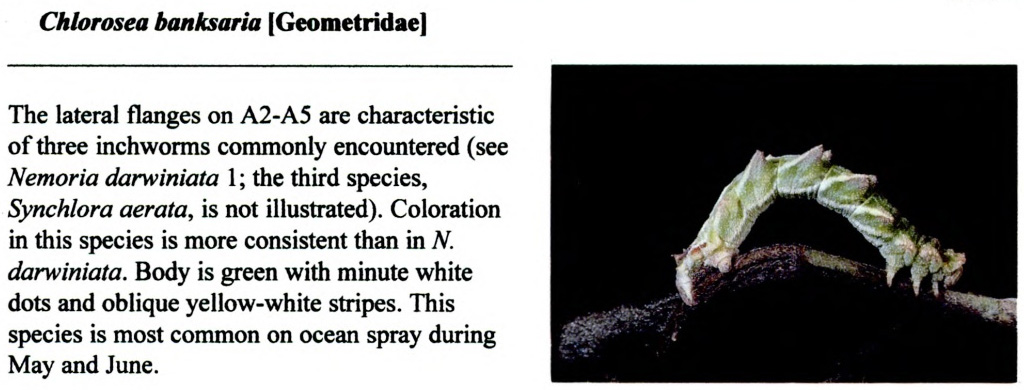
Chlorosea banksaria caterpillar

== Subspecies ==
These two subspecies belong to the species Chlorosea banksaria:

- Chlorosea banksaria banksaria
- Chlorosea banksaria gracearia Sperry, 1969
