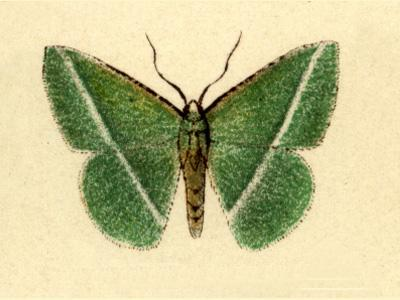
- Dichorda rhodocephala

Scientific classification
- Kingdom: Animalia
- Phylum: Arthropoda
- Class: Insecta
- Order: Lepidoptera
- Family: Geometridae
- Subfamily: Geometrinae
- Tribe: Nemoriini
- Genus: Dichorda; Warren, 1900

= Dichorda =

Genus of moths

Dichorda is a genus of moths in the family Geometridae.

== Species ==
- Dichorda iris (Butler, 1881)
- Dichorda obliquata Warren, 1904
- Dichorda porphyropis Prout, 1925
- Dichorda consequaria (H. Edwards, 1884)
- Dichorda illustraria (Hulst, 1886)
- Dichorda iridaria (Guenée, 1857)
- Dichorda rectaria (Grote, 1877)
- Dichorda rhodocephala Prout, 1916
- Dichorda uniformis Warren, 1909
