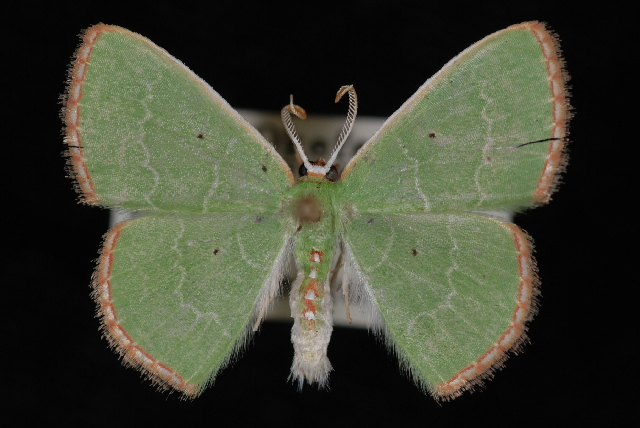

Scientific classification
- Domain: Eukaryota
- Kingdom: Animalia
- Phylum: Arthropoda
- Class: Insecta
- Order: Lepidoptera
- Family: Geometridae
- Genus: Nemoria
- Species: N. catachloa

Binomial name
- Nemoria catachloa (Hulst, 1898)

= Nemoria catachloa =

Species of moth

Nemoria catachloa is a species of emerald moth in the family Geometridae. It is found in North America.

The MONA or Hodges number for Nemoria catachloa is 7031.
