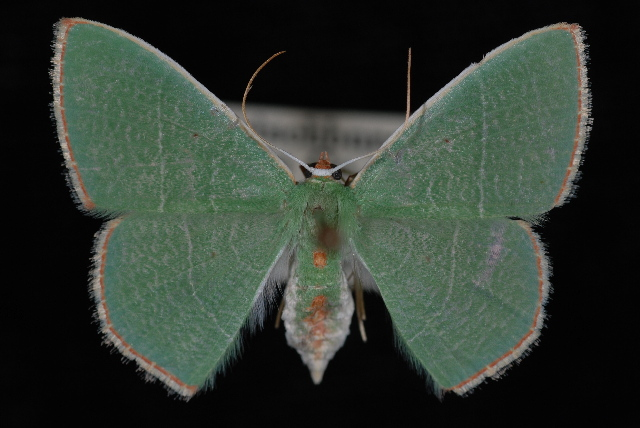

Scientific classification
- Kingdom: Animalia
- Phylum: Arthropoda
- Class: Insecta
- Order: Lepidoptera
- Family: Geometridae
- Genus: Nemoria
- Species: N. bifilata

Binomial name
- Nemoria bifilata (Walker, 1863)

Synonyms
- Anisodes bifilata Walker, 1863; Racheospila abdominaria Barnes & McDunnough, 1917

= Nemoria bifilata =

Species of moth

Nemoria bifilata, the white-barred emerald moth, is a moth in the family Geometridae. The species was first described by Francis Walker in 1863. It is found in North America.

The MONA or Hodges number for Nemoria bifilata is 7045.

== Subspecies ==
Two subspecies belong to Nemoria bifilata:

- Nemoria bifilata bifilata (Walker, 1863)^{g b}
- Nemoria bifilata planuscula Ferguson, 1969^{c g b}

Data sources: i = ITIS, c = Catalogue of Life, g = GBIF, b = BugGuide
