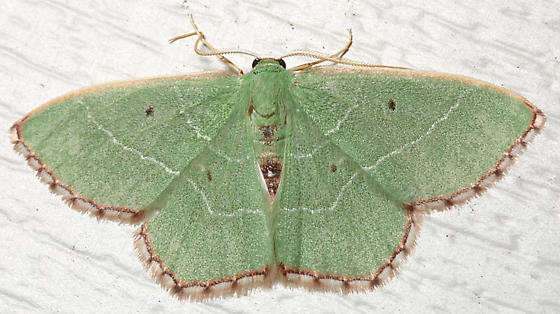

Scientific classification
- Kingdom: Animalia
- Phylum: Arthropoda
- Class: Insecta
- Order: Lepidoptera
- Family: Geometridae
- Genus: Nemoria
- Species: N. saturiba

Binomial name
- Nemoria saturiba Ferguson, 1969

= Nemoria saturiba =

Species of moth

Nemoria saturiba is a moth of the family Geometridae first described by Alexander Douglas Campbell Ferguson in 1969. It is found from Florida to North Carolina and in South Carolina, Virginia, Kentucky, Tennessee, Alabama, Mississippi, Louisiana and eastern Texas. In the north, it is found at least up to Maryland.

The wingspan is about 20 mm.

The larvae feed on Liquidambar styraciflua.
