= Nemoria rubrifrontaria =

Scientific classification
- Kingdom: Animalia
- Phylum: Arthropoda
- Clade: Pancrustacea
- Class: Insecta
- Order: Lepidoptera
- Family: Geometridae
- Genus: Nemoria
- Species: N. rubrifrontaria

Binomial name
- Nemoria rubrifrontaria (Packard, 1873)

Species of moth

Nemoria rubrifrontaria, the red-fronted emerald, is a species of moth in the family Geometridae (geometrid moths), in the superfamily Geometroidea (geometrid and swallowtail moths). The species was described by Alpheus Spring Packard in 1873. It is found in North America.

The MONA or Hodges number for Nemoria rubrifrontaria is 7047.

The species has pink eggs. Larvae appear to mimic the leaves of sweet fern, and go through five instars.
