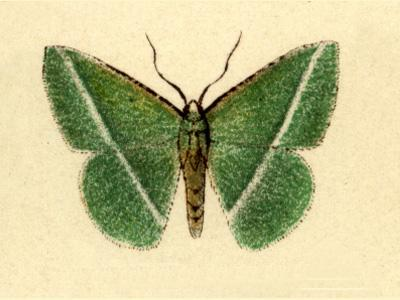

Scientific classification
- Kingdom: Animalia
- Phylum: Arthropoda
- Clade: Pancrustacea
- Class: Insecta
- Order: Lepidoptera
- Family: Geometridae
- Genus: Dichorda
- Species: D. rhodocephala

Binomial name
- Dichorda rhodocephala Prout, 1916

= Dichorda rhodocephala =

Species of moth

Dichorda rhodocephala is a moth of the family Geometridae first described by Louis Beethoven Prout in 1916. It is found on Jamaica.
