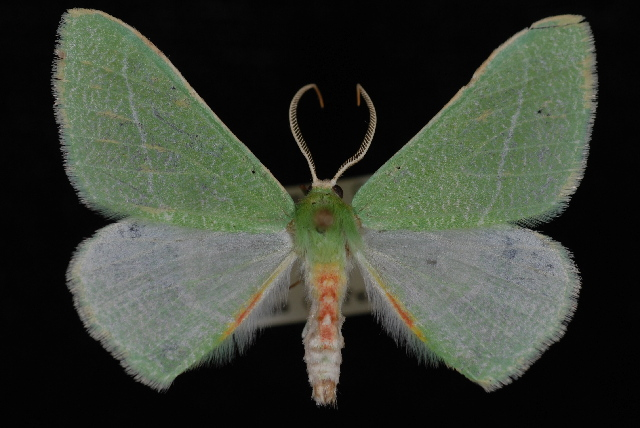
- Chlorosea roseitacta

Scientific classification
- Kingdom: Animalia
- Phylum: Arthropoda
- Clade: Pancrustacea
- Class: Insecta
- Order: Lepidoptera
- Family: Geometridae
- Tribe: Nemoriini
- Genus: Chlorosea; Packard, 1874

= Chlorosea =

Genus of moths

Chlorosea is a genus of moths in the family Geometridae.

== Species ==
- Chlorosea banksaria Sperry, 1944
- Chlorosea margaretaria Sperry, 1944
- Chlorosea nevadaria Packard, 1874
- Chlorosea roseitacta Prout, 1912
