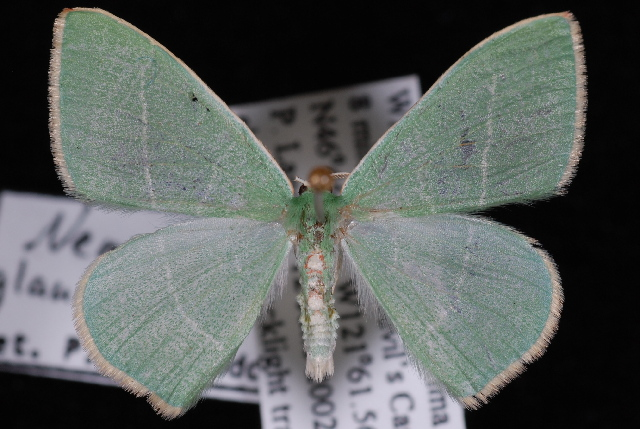

Scientific classification
- Domain: Eukaryota
- Kingdom: Animalia
- Phylum: Arthropoda
- Class: Insecta
- Order: Lepidoptera
- Family: Geometridae
- Genus: Nemoria
- Species: N. glaucomarginaria

Binomial name
- Nemoria glaucomarginaria (Barnes & McDunnough, 1917)

= Nemoria glaucomarginaria =

Species of moth

Nemoria glaucomarginaria is a species of emerald moth in the family Geometridae first described by William Barnes and James Halliday McDunnough in 1917. It is found in North America.

The MONA or Hodges number for Nemoria glaucomarginaria is 7049.
