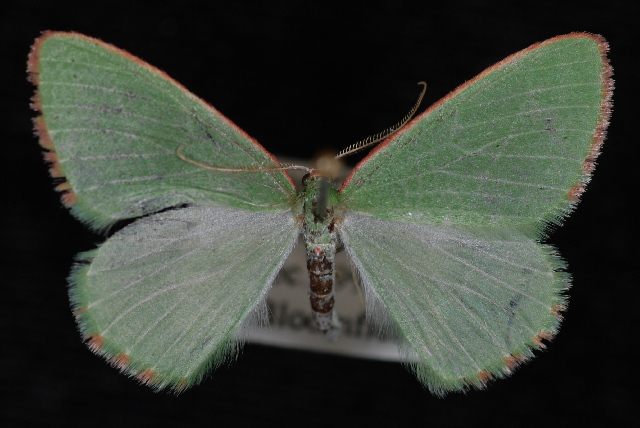

Scientific classification
- Domain: Eukaryota
- Kingdom: Animalia
- Phylum: Arthropoda
- Class: Insecta
- Order: Lepidoptera
- Family: Geometridae
- Genus: Nemoria
- Species: N. pulcherrima

Binomial name
- Nemoria pulcherrima (Barnes & McDunnough, 1916)

= Nemoria pulcherrima =

Species of moth

Nemoria pulcherrima is a species of emerald moth in the family Geometridae first described by William Barnes and James Halliday McDunnough in 1916. It is found in North America.

The MONA or Hodges number for Nemoria pulcherrima is 7016.
