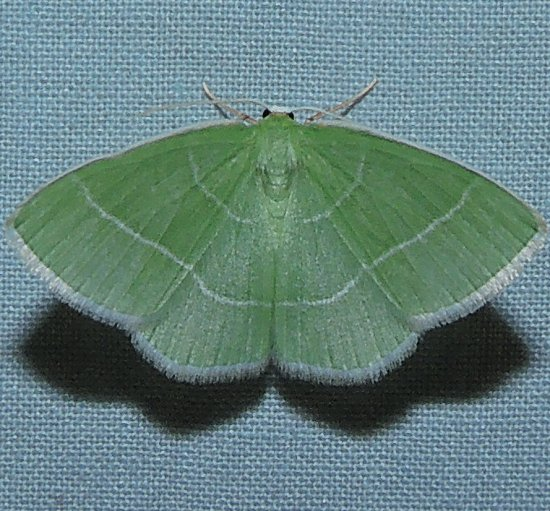
- Adult specimen

Scientific classification
- Kingdom: Animalia
- Phylum: Arthropoda
- Clade: Pancrustacea
- Class: Insecta
- Order: Lepidoptera
- Family: Geometridae
- Genus: Nemoria
- Species: N. mimosaria

Binomial name
- Nemoria mimosaria (Guenée, [1858])

Synonyms
- Aplodes mimosaria Guenée, 1857; Iodis tractaria Walker, 1861; Hipparchiscus venustus Walsh, 1864; Aplodes approximaria Packard, 1873; Aplodes latiaria Packard, 1873; Aplodes coniferaria Packard, 1884

= Nemoria mimosaria =

Species of moth

Nemoria mimosaria, the white-fringed emerald or flanged looper, is a moth of the family Geometridae. The species was first described by Achille Guenée in 1858. It is found from Nova Scotia to south-eastern Alberta, south to Virginia, Illinois, and Texas.

The wingspan is about 26 mm. Adults are on wing from mid to late June.

The larvae feed on various deciduous shrubs and trees and conifer trees, including Betula papyrifera, Abies balsamifera, Salix, Alnus, and Myrica asplenifolia.
