= Nemoria pistaciaria =

Scientific classification
- Kingdom: Animalia
- Phylum: Arthropoda
- Clade: Pancrustacea
- Class: Insecta
- Order: Lepidoptera
- Family: Geometridae
- Genus: Nemoria
- Species: N. pistaciaria

Binomial name
- Nemoria pistaciaria (Packard, 1876)

Species of moth

Nemoria pistaciaria is a species of emerald moth in the family Geometridae. It is found in North America.

The MONA or Hodges number for Nemoria pistaciaria is 7027.
