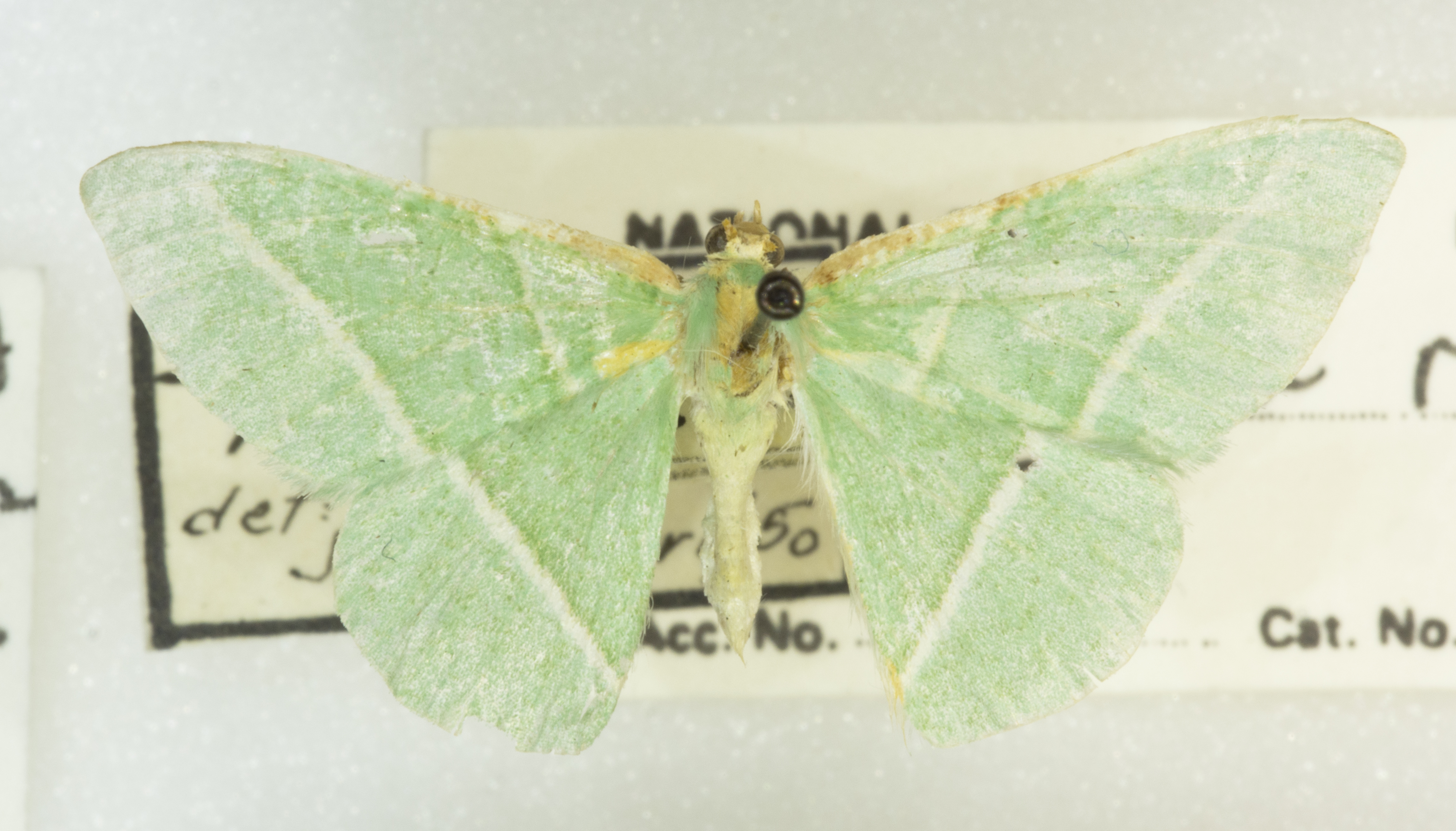

Scientific classification
- Domain: Eukaryota
- Kingdom: Animalia
- Phylum: Arthropoda
- Class: Insecta
- Order: Lepidoptera
- Family: Geometridae
- Genus: Dichorda
- Species: D. rectaria

Binomial name
- Dichorda rectaria (Grote, 1877)

= Dichorda rectaria =

Species of moth

Dichorda rectaria is a species of emerald moth in the family Geometridae. It is found in North America.

The MONA or Hodges number for Dichorda rectaria is 7056.

== Subspecies ==
These two subspecies belong to the species Dichorda rectaria:

- Dichorda rectaria cockerelli Sperry, 1939
- Dichorda rectaria rectaria
