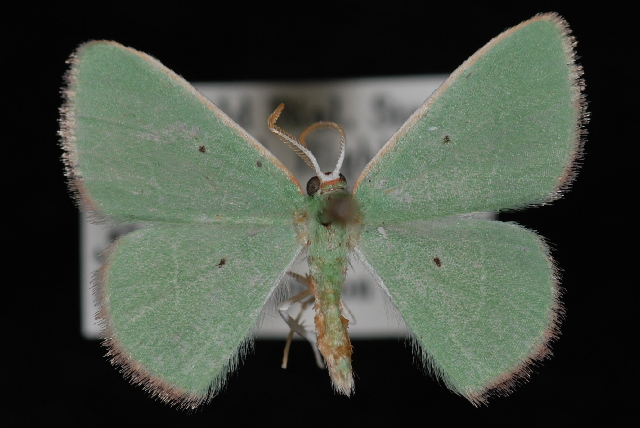

Scientific classification
- Kingdom: Animalia
- Phylum: Arthropoda
- Class: Insecta
- Order: Lepidoptera
- Family: Geometridae
- Genus: Nemoria
- Species: N. extremaria

Binomial name
- Nemoria extremaria (Walker, 1861)

= Nemoria extremaria =

Species of moth

Nemoria extremaria is a species of emerald moth in the family Geometridae. It is found in North America.

The MONA or Hodges number for Nemoria extremaria is 7028.
