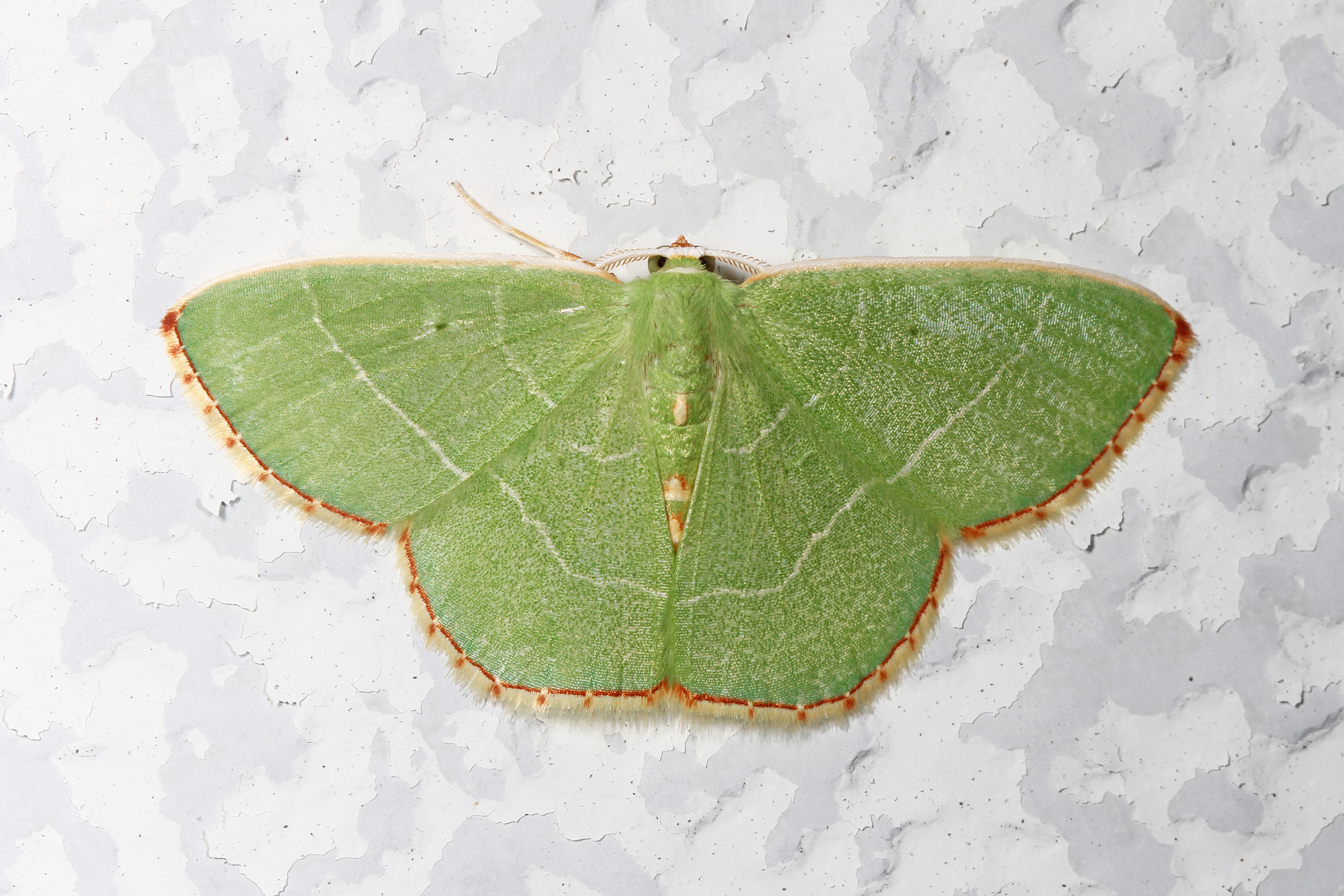

Scientific classification
- Kingdom: Animalia
- Phylum: Arthropoda
- Class: Insecta
- Order: Lepidoptera
- Family: Geometridae
- Genus: Nemoria
- Species: N. bistriaria

Binomial name
- Nemoria bistriaria Hübner, 1818

Synonyms
- Aplodes rubrolinearia Packard, 1873; Aplodes brunnearia Packard, 1876; Geometra siccifolia Fitch, 1857; Aplodes rubromarginaria Packard, 1876

= Nemoria bistriaria =

Species of moth

Nemoria bistriaria, the red-fringed emerald or two-striped emerald, is a species of moth of the family Geometridae. It is found from New Brunswick to Florida, west to Central Coast of California, north to Ontario.

The wingspan is about 22 mm. Adults are on wing from March to October in the south and from May to August in the north. There are at least two generations per year.

== Subspecies ==
- Nemoria bistriaria bistriaria
- Nemoria bistriaria siccifolia (Pennsylvania to southern Quebec and Ontario)
