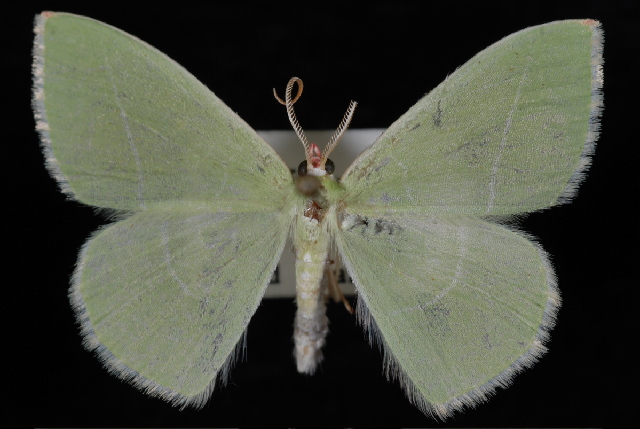

Scientific classification
- Kingdom: Animalia
- Phylum: Arthropoda
- Clade: Pancrustacea
- Class: Insecta
- Order: Lepidoptera
- Family: Geometridae
- Genus: Nemoria
- Species: N. unitaria

Binomial name
- Nemoria unitaria (Packard, 1873)

= Nemoria unitaria =

Species of moth

Nemoria unitaria, the single-lined emerald, is a species of emerald moth in the family Geometridae. It is found in North America.
