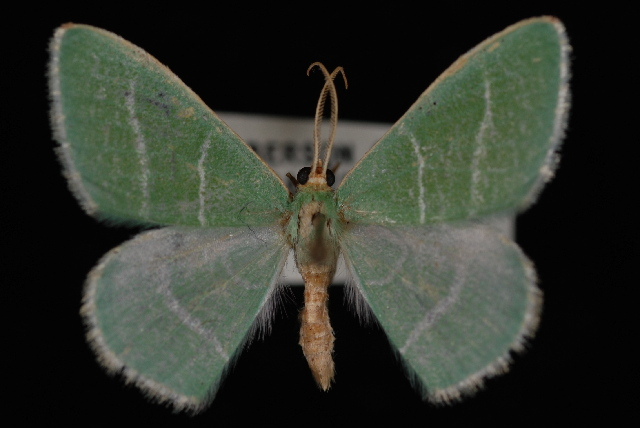

Scientific classification
- Domain: Eukaryota
- Kingdom: Animalia
- Phylum: Arthropoda
- Class: Insecta
- Order: Lepidoptera
- Family: Geometridae
- Tribe: Nemoriini
- Genus: Nemoria
- Species: N. intensaria

Binomial name
- Nemoria intensaria (Pearsall, 1911)

= Nemoria intensaria =

Species of moth

Nemoria intensaria is a species of emerald moth in the family Geometridae. It is found in North America.

The MONA or Hodges number for Nemoria intensaria is 7043.
