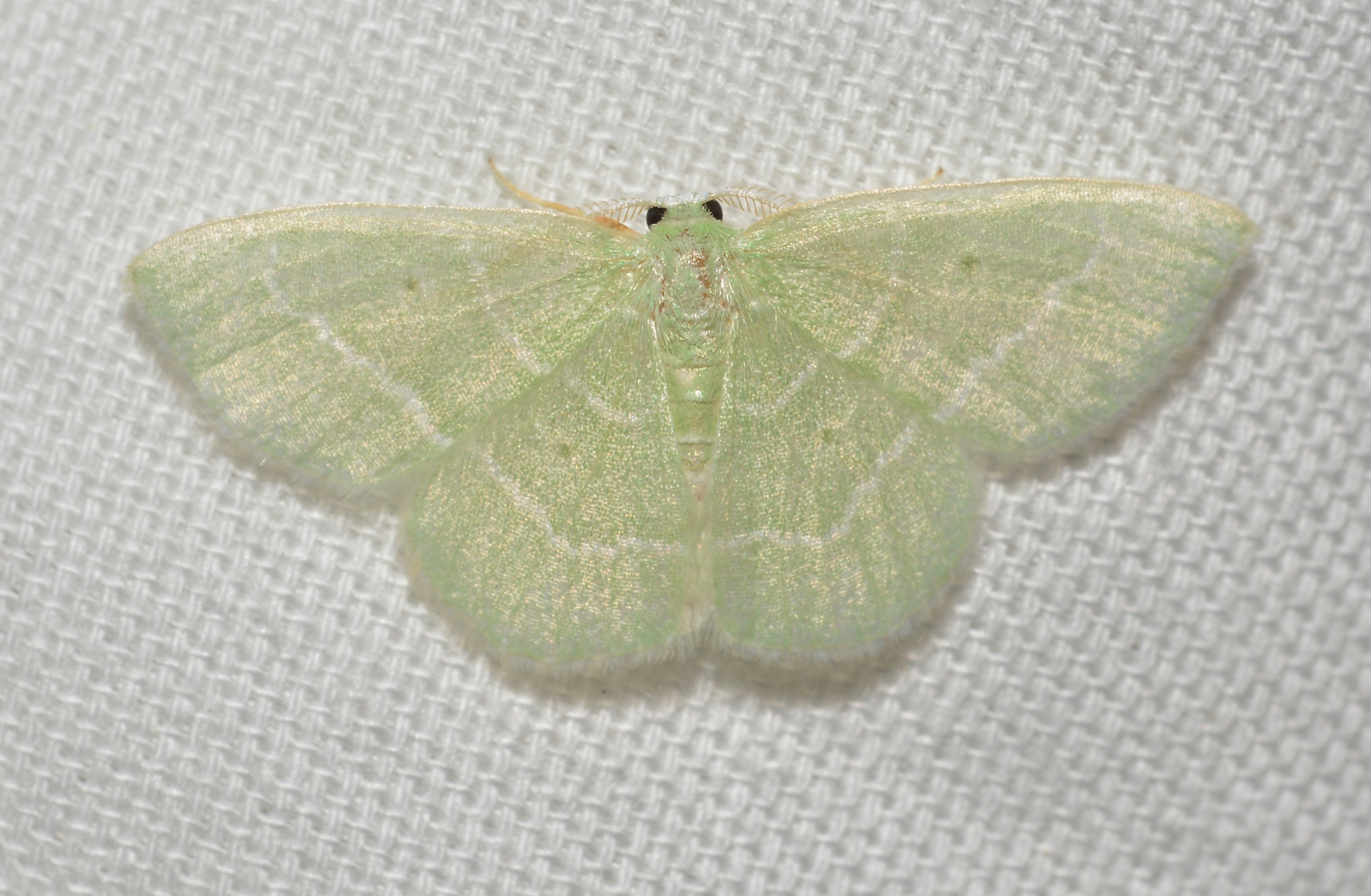

Scientific classification
- Kingdom: Animalia
- Phylum: Arthropoda
- Class: Insecta
- Order: Lepidoptera
- Family: Geometridae
- Genus: Nemoria
- Species: N. elfa

Binomial name
- Nemoria elfa Ferguson, 1969

= Nemoria elfa =

Species of moth

Nemoria elfa, the cypress emerald moth, is a species of emerald in the family Geometridae. It is found in North America.

The MONA or Hodges number for Nemoria elfa is 7029.
