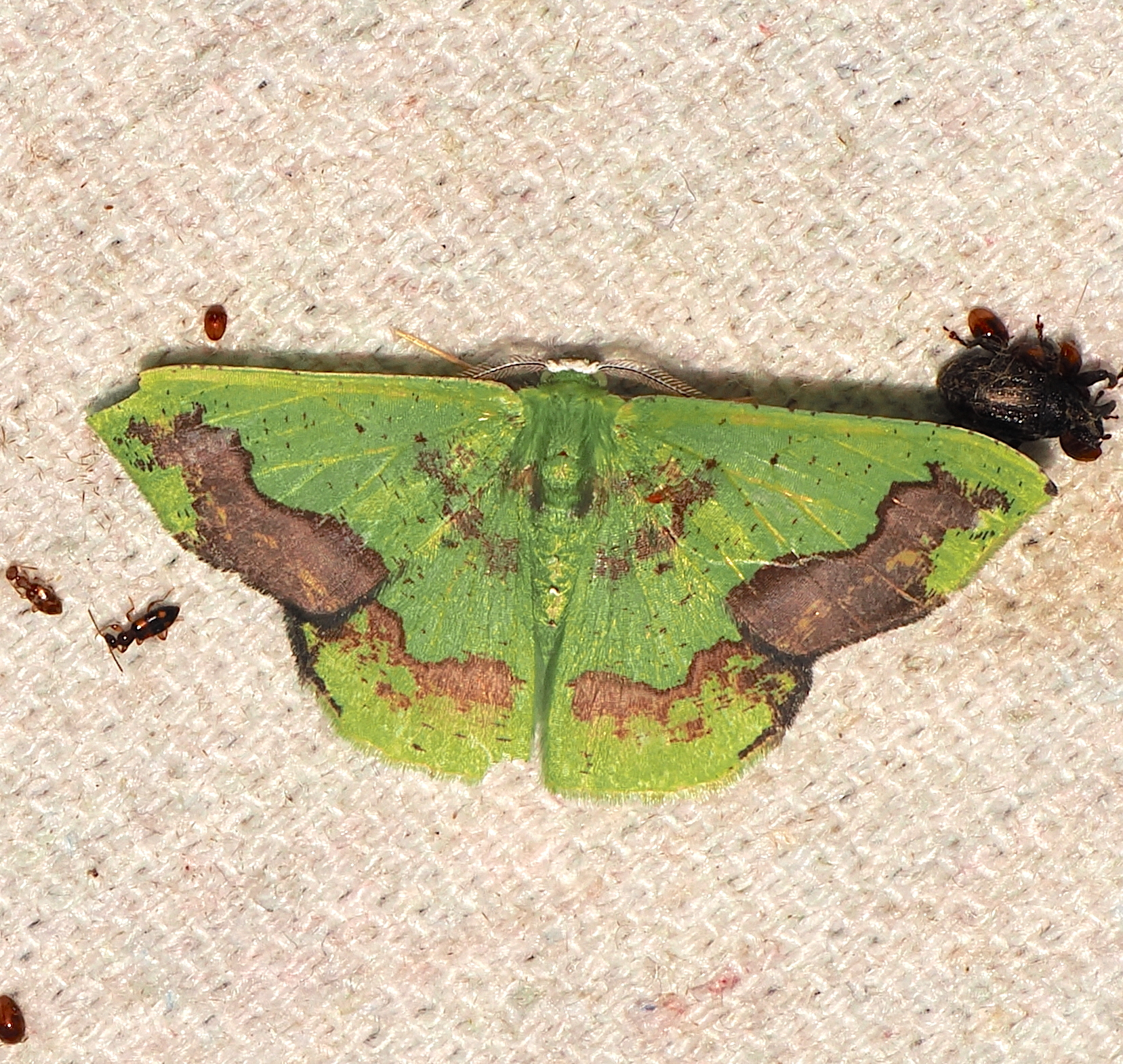
- Phrudocentra janeira

Scientific classification
- Kingdom: Animalia
- Phylum: Arthropoda
- Clade: Pancrustacea
- Class: Insecta
- Order: Lepidoptera
- Family: Geometridae
- Tribe: Nemoriini
- Genus: Phrudocentra; Warren, 1895

Synonyms
- Melochlora Warren, 1901; Nesipola Warren, 1909

= Phrudocentra =

Genus of moths

Phrudocentra is a genus of moths in the family Geometridae. The genus was described by Warren in 1895.

== Species ==
- Phrudocentra centrifugaria (Herrich-Schäffer, 1870) Florida, Greater Antilles - Puerto Rico
- Phrudocentra impunctata (Warren, 1909) Dominica
- Phrudocentra kinstonensis (Butler, 1878) Jamaica
- Phrudocentra neis (Druce, 1892) southern Texas, Mexico - Panama
- Phrudocentra pupillata (Warren, 1897) Guyana
