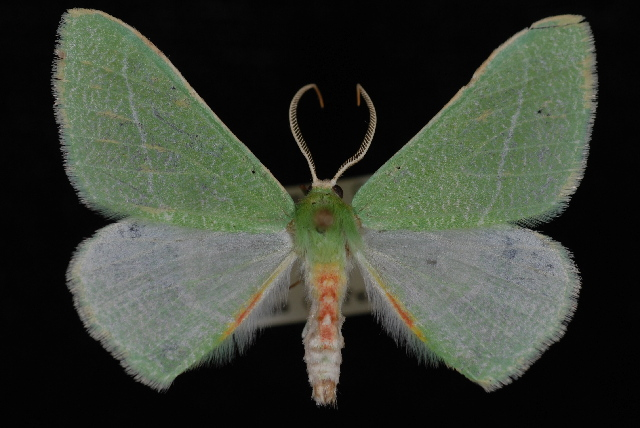

Scientific classification
- Kingdom: Animalia
- Phylum: Arthropoda
- Clade: Pancrustacea
- Class: Insecta
- Order: Lepidoptera
- Family: Geometridae
- Genus: Chlorosea
- Species: C. roseitacta

Binomial name
- Chlorosea roseitacta Prout in Wytsman, 1912

= Chlorosea roseitacta =

Species of moth

Chlorosea roseitacta is a species of emerald moth in the family Geometridae. It is found in North America.
