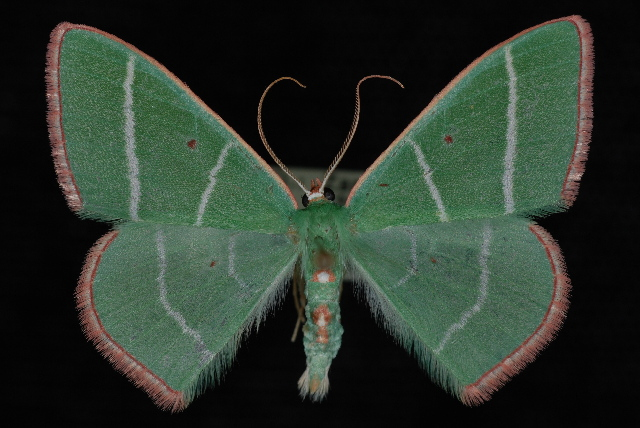

Scientific classification
- Domain: Eukaryota
- Kingdom: Animalia
- Phylum: Arthropoda
- Class: Insecta
- Order: Lepidoptera
- Family: Geometridae
- Genus: Nemoria
- Species: N. obliqua

Binomial name
- Nemoria obliqua (Hulst, 1898)

= Nemoria obliqua =

Species of moth

Nemoria obliqua is a species of emerald moth in the family Geometridae. It is found in Central America and North America.

The MONA or Hodges number for Nemoria obliqua is 7037.

== Subspecies ==
These two subspecies belong to the species Nemoria obliqua:

- Nemoria obliqua hennei Sperry, 1953
- Nemoria obliqua obliqua
