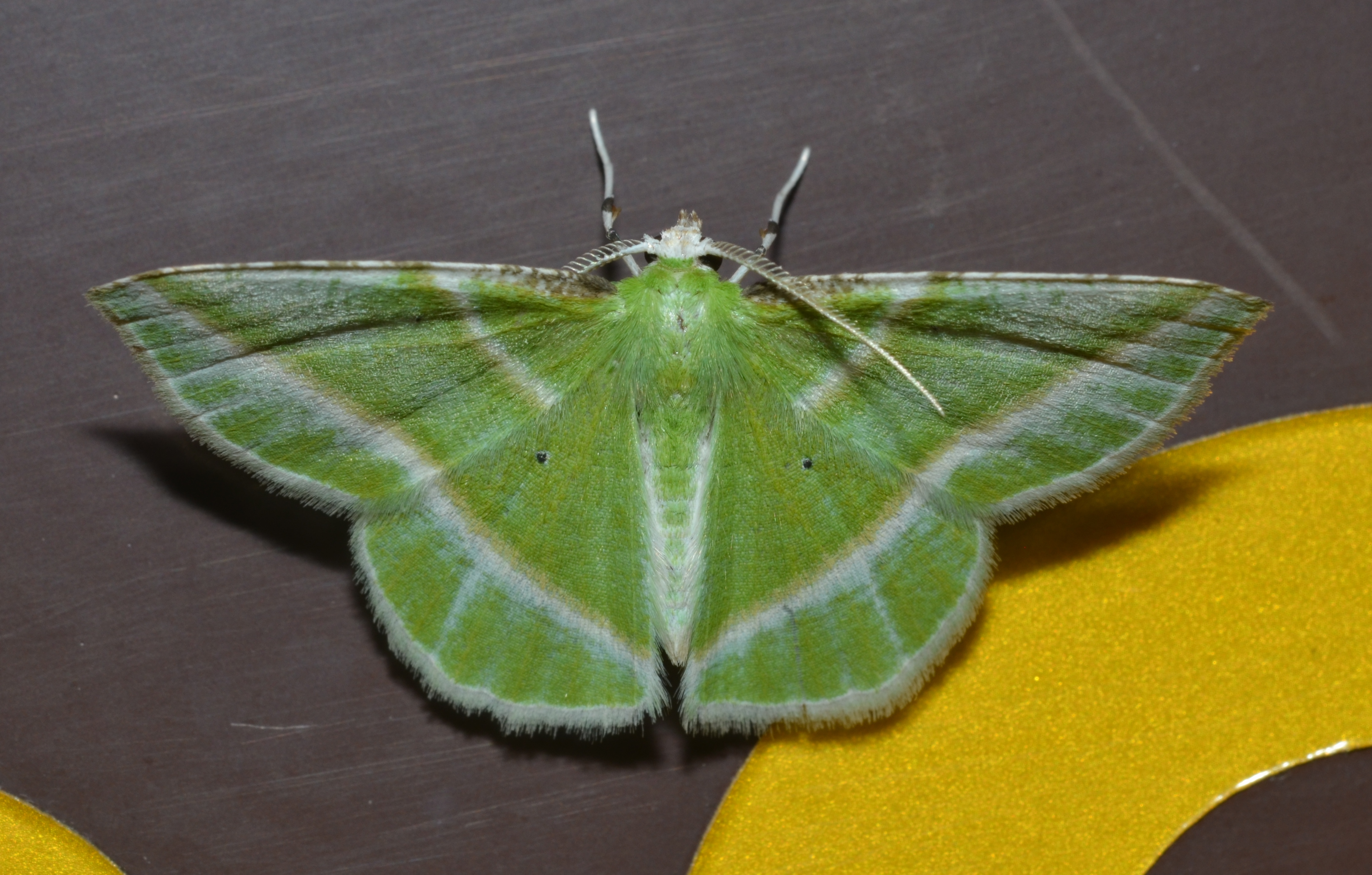

Scientific classification
- Kingdom: Animalia
- Phylum: Arthropoda
- Class: Insecta
- Order: Lepidoptera
- Family: Geometridae
- Genus: Dichorda
- Species: D. iridaria

Binomial name
- Dichorda iridaria (Guenée, 1857)

Synonyms
- Geometra iridaria Guenee, 1857; Phalaena albolineata Martyn, 1797; Geometra remotaria Walker, 1861; Slossonia latipennis Hulst, 1898

= Dichorda iridaria =

Species of moth

Dichorda iridaria, the showy emerald moth, is a moth of the family Geometridae. The species was first described by Achille Guenée in 1857. It is found in North America, where it has been recorded from Alabama, Arkansas, Florida, Georgia, Illinois, Indiana, Iowa, Kentucky, Maryland, Massachusetts, Mississippi, New Hampshire, New Jersey, New York, North Carolina, Ohio, Oklahoma, Ontario, Pennsylvania, Quebec, South Carolina, Tennessee, Texas, Virginia, West Virginia and Wisconsin.

The wingspan is about 25–28 mm.

The larvae feed on Rhus species, including Rhus typhina and Rhus copallina. and Toxicodendron radicans.

== Subspecies ==
- Dichorda iridaria iridaria (from Texas to Quebec, Ontario, Nova Scotia, Missouri, Kansas)
- Dichorda iridaria remotaria (Walker, 1861) (from Florida to South Carolina)
