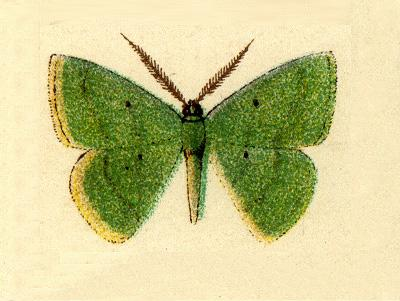

Scientific classification
- Kingdom: Animalia
- Phylum: Arthropoda
- Class: Insecta
- Order: Lepidoptera
- Family: Geometridae
- Genus: Phrudocentra
- Species: P. kinstonensis

Binomial name
- Phrudocentra kinstonensis (Butler, 1878)

Synonyms
- Jodis kinstonensis Butler, 1878

= Phrudocentra kinstonensis =

Species of moth

Phrudocentra kinstonensis is a moth of the family Geometridae. It is found on Jamaica.
