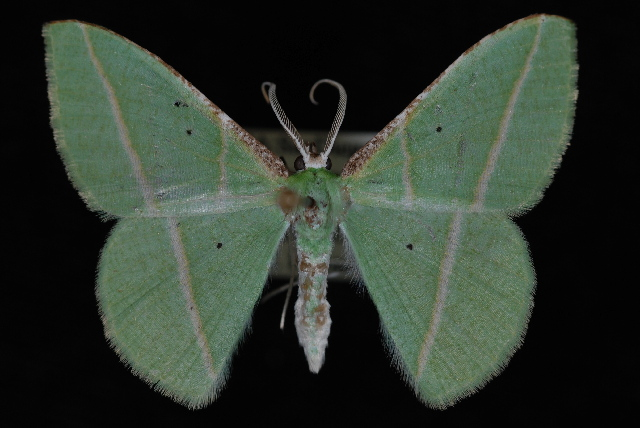

Scientific classification
- Kingdom: Animalia
- Phylum: Arthropoda
- Clade: Pancrustacea
- Class: Insecta
- Order: Lepidoptera
- Family: Geometridae
- Genus: Dichorda
- Species: D. illustraria

Binomial name
- Dichorda illustraria (Hulst, 1886)

= Dichorda illustraria =

Species of moth

Dichorda illustraria is a species of emerald moth in the family Geometridae. It is found in Central America and North America.
