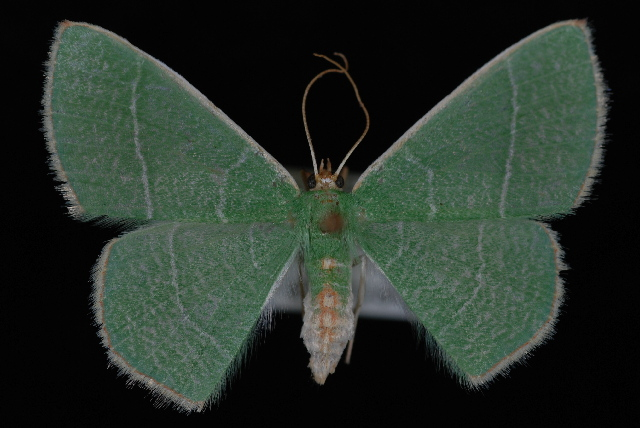

Scientific classification
- Kingdom: Animalia
- Phylum: Arthropoda
- Class: Insecta
- Order: Lepidoptera
- Family: Geometridae
- Genus: Nemoria
- Species: N. festaria

Binomial name
- Nemoria festaria (Hulst, 1886)

= Nemoria festaria =

Species of moth

Nemoria festaria is a species of emerald moth in the family Geometridae. It is found in North America.

The MONA or Hodges number for Nemoria festaria is 7044.
