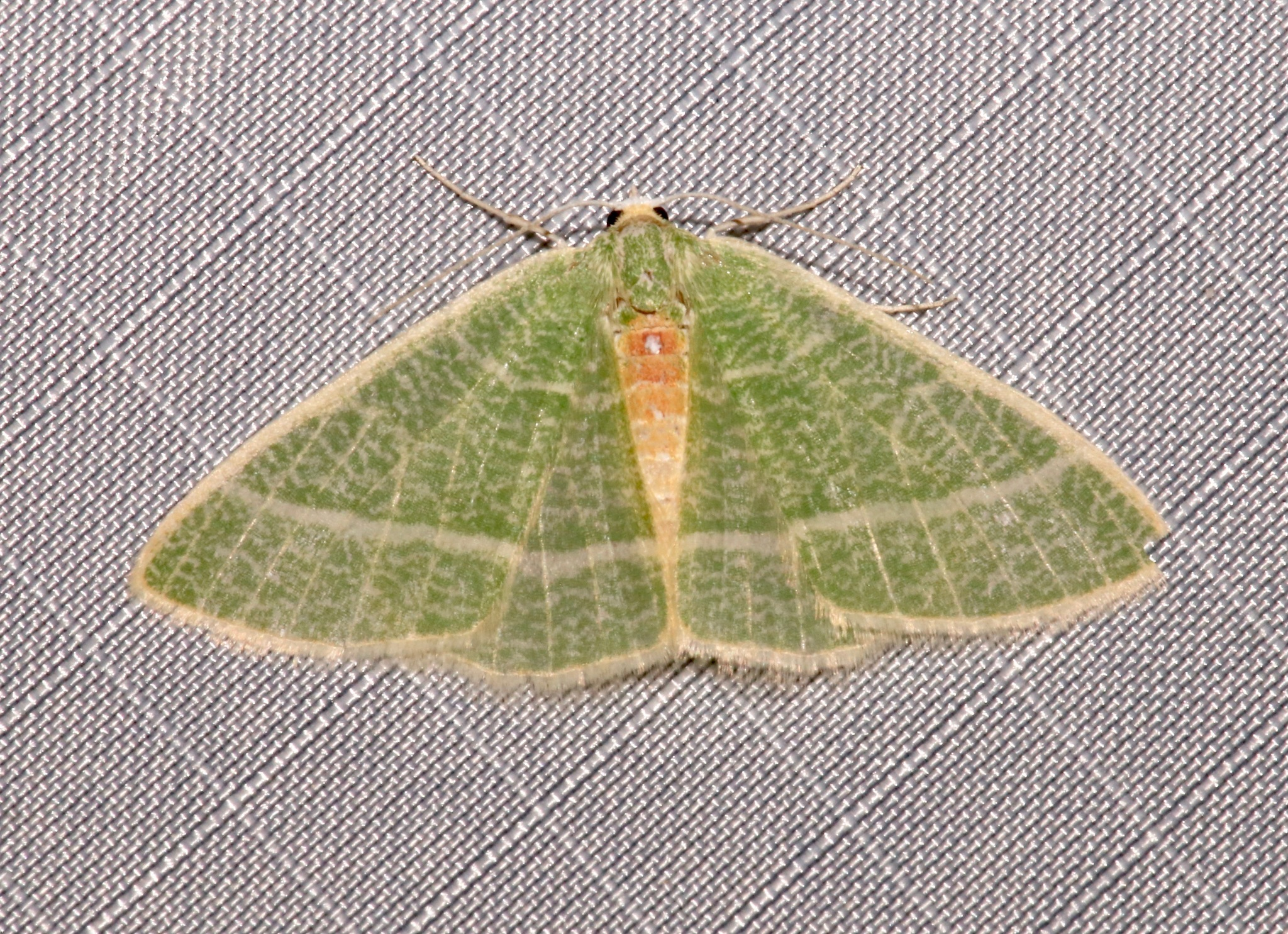

Scientific classification
- Kingdom: Animalia
- Phylum: Arthropoda
- Clade: Pancrustacea
- Class: Insecta
- Order: Lepidoptera
- Family: Geometridae
- Genus: Nemoria
- Species: N. arizonaria

Binomial name
- Nemoria arizonaria Grote, 1883

= Nemoria arizonaria =

Species of moth

Nemoria arizonaria is a species of moth belonging to the family Geometridae. It was first described (and classified as Aplodes arizonaria) by Augustus Radcliffe Grote in 1883. It is indigenous to Arizona, New Mexico and the Davis Mountains in Texas.

== History ==
The family Geometridae contains over 21,000 species and can be found all across the globe. The Geometrinae subfamily contains 2350 species. Many of these species can be identified by the similar emerald green coloration observed in N. arizonaria, which led to the creation of the common name emerald moth. Comparative analysis of Nemoria's biogeographic history suggests that the genus originated in South America. Such a close proximity to the United States' southwest region can explain the present day localization to this area. It has been suggested that Nemoria was introduced many times - the genus is the largest of the New World Geometrinae and is estimated to be around 7.5 million years old. Nemoria is most commonly known for the phenotypic plasticity of its larvae stages in many species. There are now 15 recognized species of Nemoria.

== Habitat and distribution ==
Nemoria arizonaria is typically restricted to canyon habitats of elevations around 4,000 to 8,000 feet. Within the United States, N. arizonaria seems to originate from Arizona, New Mexico, Mexico, Southern California and the Davis Mountains of Texas, although the summer (aemularia) form has only been found in Arizona. The moth can commonly be found resting on windows and screens throughout the Southwest United States.

== Seasonal forms ==
The species has two seasonal forms: the summer form and winter/spring form. The summer form can be identified by its white costa. Until recently, this form was thought to have been a separate species from N.arizonaria and was given the name Nemoria aemularia. In 1988, Noel McFarland discovered that N. aemularia adults could be reared from N. arizonaria eggs – proving that N.arizonaria and N. aemularia were actually the same moth, but due to seasonal dimorphism could result in substantially different phenotypic forms

Seasonal dimorphism is one type of polyphenism observed in the species, the other of which occurs at the larvae stage.

== Life stages ==
Larvae born in the spring feed on oak catkin (flower) and resemble catkins in appearance, while those that feed on oak leaves express a different phenotype, specifically one that resembles a twig. In fact, diet alone regulates the expressed phenotype. The larvae enter the pupa stage after a few weeks and soon develop into adults. The adult dies shortly after mating and laying egg.

== Feeding ==
As discussed above, larvae feed either on catkins or oak leaves and twigs depending upon the season. Adults, on the other hand, feed on nectar. Studies on Lepidoptera have found that feeding behavior is in fact triggered by sugar-receptor communication with chemosensilla, and that both starch and sucrose compete for taste receptor sites along the sensilla. When starch and sucrose were artificially added to bind to sensilla receptor sites, Lepodoptera stopped food-sucking behavior all together. Even though they were still hungry, their artificially occupied receptor sites signaled otherwise.

== Adult ==
N. arizonaria is emerald colored, possessing a wide post-medial line - one of the broadest amongst all North American Nemoria species. The species also has a thin, yellow colored terminal line on the wing, with a slight red color between veins. A white fringe outlines its one- inch wingspan. A distinguishing feature between the two seasonal forms is the presence of purple-red markings on the costa of the forewing in the summer form. In this form, the abdomen contains reddish brown markings on the first few segments on the males, while female abdomens have pale red markings. Male and certain females also possess small white spots on the abdomen.

== Larvae ==
The timing of birth affects the phenotype of these caterpillars: N. arizonaria born in the spring feed on oak catkins and thus develop a cuticle that resembles catkin flower. Those that are born in the summer must eat oak leaves since catkins are no longer abundant at this time of year. These larvae develop to mimic oak twigs instead, acquiring a smooth grey-green appearance. Because catkins contain more nutrition than leaves and twigs, larvae that feed on catkins are larger before they pupate. Those that feed on catkins appear golden with many small projections, a fuzzy coating, and brown dots along its back that mimic catkin stamens. Since these larvae feed on pollen, their heads and mandibles are smaller than those that feed on leaves and twigs, possibly because large mandibles are not necessary for catkin consumption3. Subsequent rearing experiments have shown that only larval diet influence the developmental trigger.

Although genotypically similar, these eggs, upon hatching, begin feeding on oak leaves rather than the out of season catkins and develop jaws to accommodate feeding. It has been found that behavioral changes of larval mandibles occur in both H. buttivitta and H. subrotata depending upon usage, however research has not yet proven that this occurs in N. arizonaria.

== Genetic buffering ==
Genetic buffering seems to explain the complexities between genotypic and phenotypic expression by concealing genetic and environmental variations on observed phenotype – allowing for a myriad number of phenotypes for a single genotype. Rutherford explains how different larvae phenotypes of N. arizonaria were possibly developed by attributing the stages and thresholds of genetic variation storage in populations. Under normal situations, genetic buffering is intact, and all individuals with a genotype reflect identical phenotypes. However, when buffering breaks down, the expression of previously silent genes emerge and are allowed to cross, resulting in phenotypic variation from the original form. These phenotypic differences are then subject to selection. Genetic buffering allows for maintaining a certain phenotype while also allowing for the possibility of change.

== Phenotypic plasticity ==
In a similar vein, phenotypic plasticity allows for phenotypical variation across populations depending upon density, environmental triggers, and the species involved. Phenotypical variation can include both visual and behavioral aspects. Though some responses are reversible, including certain behaviors, in N. arizonaria, once a phenotype is expressed it is unchangeable. Because the fluidity resulting from phenotypic plasticity allows for a species to circumvent predator attack, phenotypic plasticity has influenced natural selection to favor such measures. Although larvae have been observed to be highly plastic, this plasticity is not observed in adults.

Because it is thought that phenotypic plasticity has evolved independently multiple times, Nemoria species exhibiting phenotypic plasticity have been placed in several different clades to reflect this evolution. Similarly, Nemoria species that have demonstrated plasticity in adult stages have also been regrouped.

Both genetic buffering and phenotypic plasticity have been able to explain the various phenotypes observed in N. arizonaria. Much research has been done on understanding the triggers involved in phenotypic expression. After examining whether the color of light, in addition to diet, may influence phenotypic expression of N. arizonaria, Greene concluded that diet alone influenced morph induction even though light has been proven to affect the phenotype of many other polymorphic larvae. Because the larvae's diet allows it to mimic seasonal changes in sync with its residing tree, Greene concludes that this phenotypic variance has been selected for since caterpillars who do undergo these changes are better concealed from predatory birds. Dr. Greene has also discovered that tannin found within oak leaves help facilitate this change of phenotype through experiments where N. arizonaria were fed artificial diets consisting of tannin. In many Lepidoptera species, temperature regulation has a significant impact on the resulting larvae. For example, when Danaus plexippus, was reared in cold environments, more black pigments were observed than when it was reared in warm temperatures. Since coloration affects the absorption of radiant energy, color variation induced by temperature may serve as a form of ectothermic adaption. Despite the varying temperatures observed in N. arizonaria's habitat, no such temperature dependence of larvae have been observed.

Although phenotypic plasticity has been an increasingly popular area of study, Nemoria arizonaria is the first known case in which the species' diet, rather than light or temperature, influences its phenotypic appearance. To fully interpret the impact the environment has on a species' phenotype and development when studying developmental processes, a more thorough understanding of ecology is necessary. By synergizing both ecology and evolutionary processes, as seen through N. arizonaria studies, a better understanding of how organisms evolve and develop can be reached. Scientific Classification
