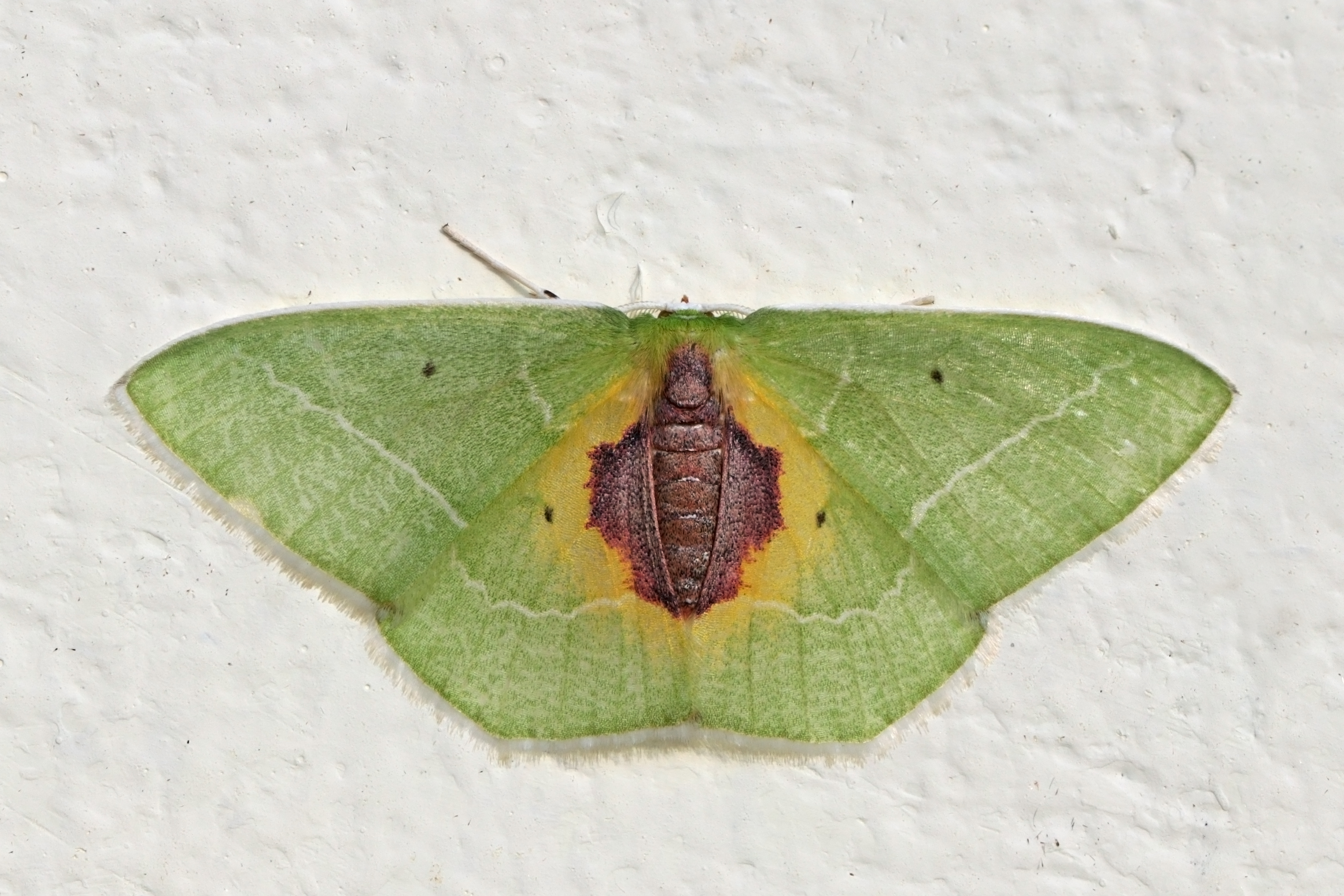

Scientific classification
- Kingdom: Animalia
- Phylum: Arthropoda
- Clade: Pancrustacea
- Class: Insecta
- Order: Lepidoptera
- Family: Geometridae
- Subfamily: Geometrinae
- Tribe: Nemoriini
- Genus: Nemoria; Hübner, 1818

Species
- 133 species

Synonyms
- Leptographa Hübner, [1823]; Racheospila Guenée, 1857; Aplodes Guenée, 1857; Hipparchiscus Walsh, 1864; Eunemoria Packard, 1873; Anaplodes Packard, 1876; Annemoria Packard, 1876; Blechroma Möschler, 1882; Miantonota Warren, 1895; Dryadopsis Warren, 1897; Miantonota Warren, 1901

= Nemoria =

Genus of moths

Nemoria is a genus of emerald moths in the family Geometridae. It was named by Jacob Hübner in 1818.

== Description ==
Palpi porrect (extending forward). Forewings with veins 7, 8, 9 and 10 stalked and veins 6 and 11 often being stalked with them. Vein 11 anastomosing (fusing) with vein 12, and then with vein 10. Hindwings with rounded outer margin. Veins 3, 4 and 6, 7 stalked. Frenulum present.

== Species ==
Species include:

- Nemoria aemularia Barnes & McDunnough, 1918
- Nemoria albaria (Grote, 1883)
- Nemoria albilineata Cassino, 1927
- Nemoria arizonaria (Grote, 1883)
- Nemoria bifilata (Walker, [1863]) – white-barred emerald
- Nemoria bistriaria Hübner, 1818 – red-fringed emerald
- Nemoria caerulescens Prout, 1912
- Nemoria catachloa (Hulst, 1898)
- Nemoria daedalea Ferguson, 1969
- Nemoria darwiniata (Dyar, 1904) – Columbian emerald
- Nemoria diamesa Ferguson, 1969
- Nemoria elfa Ferguson, 1969 – cypress emerald
- Nemoria extremaria (Walker, 1861)
- Nemoria festaria (Hulst, 1886)
- Nemoria glaucomarginaria (Barnes & McDunnough, 1917)
- Nemoria intensaria (Pearsall, 1911)
- Nemoria latirosaria (Pearsall, 1906)
- Nemoria leptalea Ferguson, 1969
- Nemoria lixaria (Guenée, [1858]) – red-bordered emerald
- Nemoria mimosaria (Guenée, [1858]) – white-fringed emerald
- Nemoria mutaticolor Prout, 1912
- Nemoria obliqua (Hulst, 1898)
- Nemoria outina Ferguson, 1969
- Nemoria pistaciaria (Packard, 1876)
- Nemoria pulcherrima (Barnes & McDunnough, 1916)
- Nemoria rindgei Ferguson, 1969
- Nemoria rubrifrontaria (Packard, 1873) – red-fronted emerald
- Nemoria saturiba Ferguson, 1969
- Nemoria splendidaria (Grossbeck, 1910)
- Nemoria strigataria (Grossbeck, 1910)
- Nemoria subsequens Ferguson, 1969
- Nemoria tuscarora Ferguson, 1969
- Nemoria unitaria (Packard, 1873) – single-lined emerald
- Nemoria viridicaria (Hulst, 1880)
- Nemoria zelotes Ferguson, 1969
- Nemoria zygotaria (Hulst, 1886)
