= Cycloalexy =

Protective insect behavior

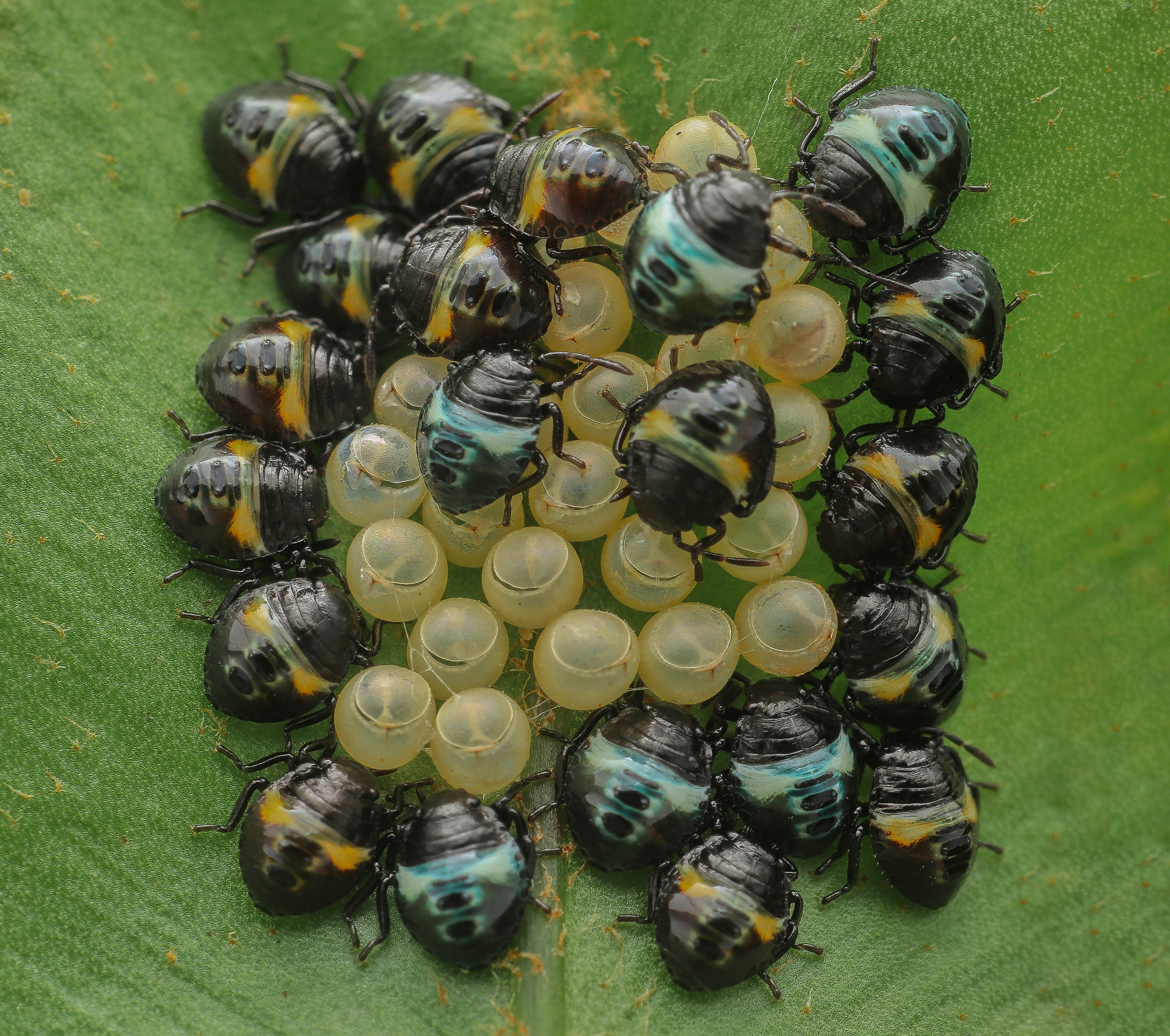
Freshly hatched pentatomid bugs showing cycloalexy

Cycloalexy is a pre-emptive, tight circular, gregarious defensive behavior seen in many immature insects. The term was coined in 1988 by entomologists Joao Vasconcellos-Neto and Pierre Jolivet. The term was derived from Greek κύκλος for "circle" and αλεκ- for "to defend" and in the original usage noted that insects sometimes had their heads facing into the centre of the circle and sometimes facing outwards. The behavior is shown in the rest condition and not in response to any predators. Other authors have called for a tightening of the definition.

Circular defense strategies were noted in 1981 in the Galerucinae and the term cycloalexy was informally suggested by Jolivet in a discussion with Loïc Matile. It was formally defined in 1988 as an attitude adopted at rest both during night and day with larvae at the periphery in close contact with each other. They were described in a number of chrysomelid beetle larvae (in the subfamilies Criocerinae, Chrysomelinae, Galerucinae, and Cassidinae). Cycloalexing behaviour has subsequently been noted in adult insects as well. Adult stingless bees (Trigona sp.), hemipteran nymphs, larvae of Ascalaphidae (head outwards), sawflies (larvae), some ants (Myrmecocystus sp.) and stingless bees are among the groups known to cycloalex. The behavior is believed to protect against insect predators and to some extent parasitoids.
