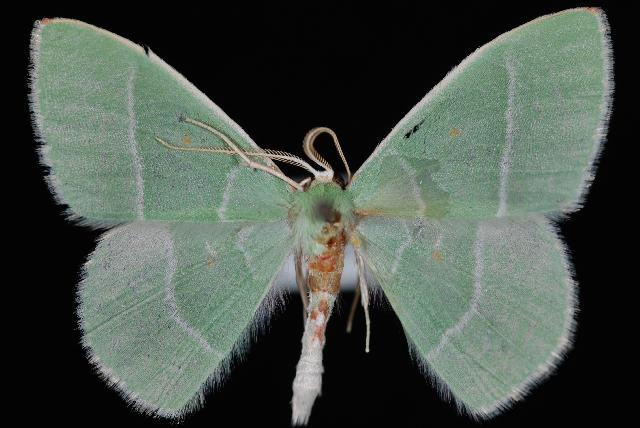

Scientific classification
- Kingdom: Animalia
- Phylum: Arthropoda
- Clade: Pancrustacea
- Class: Insecta
- Order: Lepidoptera
- Family: Geometridae
- Genus: Nemoria
- Species: N. darwiniata

Binomial name
- Nemoria darwiniata (Dyar, 1904)

= Nemoria darwiniata =

Species of moth

Nemoria darwiniata, the Columbian emerald, is a species of emerald moth in the family Geometridae. It was first described by Harrison Gray Dyar Jr. in 1904 and it is found in North America.

== Subspecies ==
There are two subspecies:

- Nemoria darwiniata darwiniata
- Nemoria darwiniata punctularia (Barnes & McDunnough, 1918)

=== Gallery ===
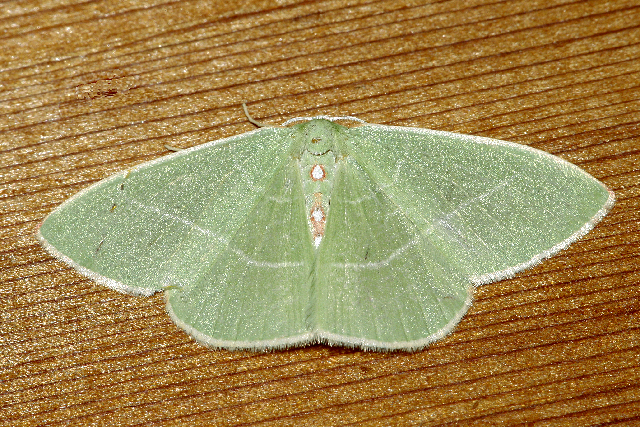
Nemoria darwiniata

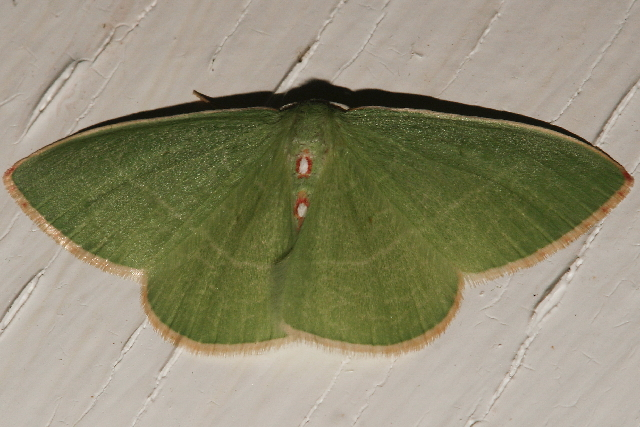
Nemoria darwiniata

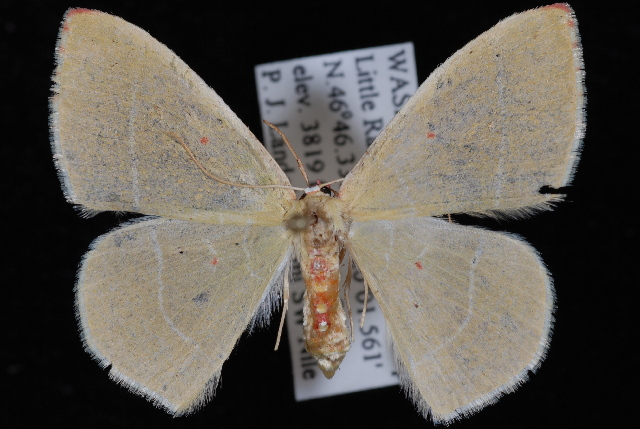
Nemoria darwiniata

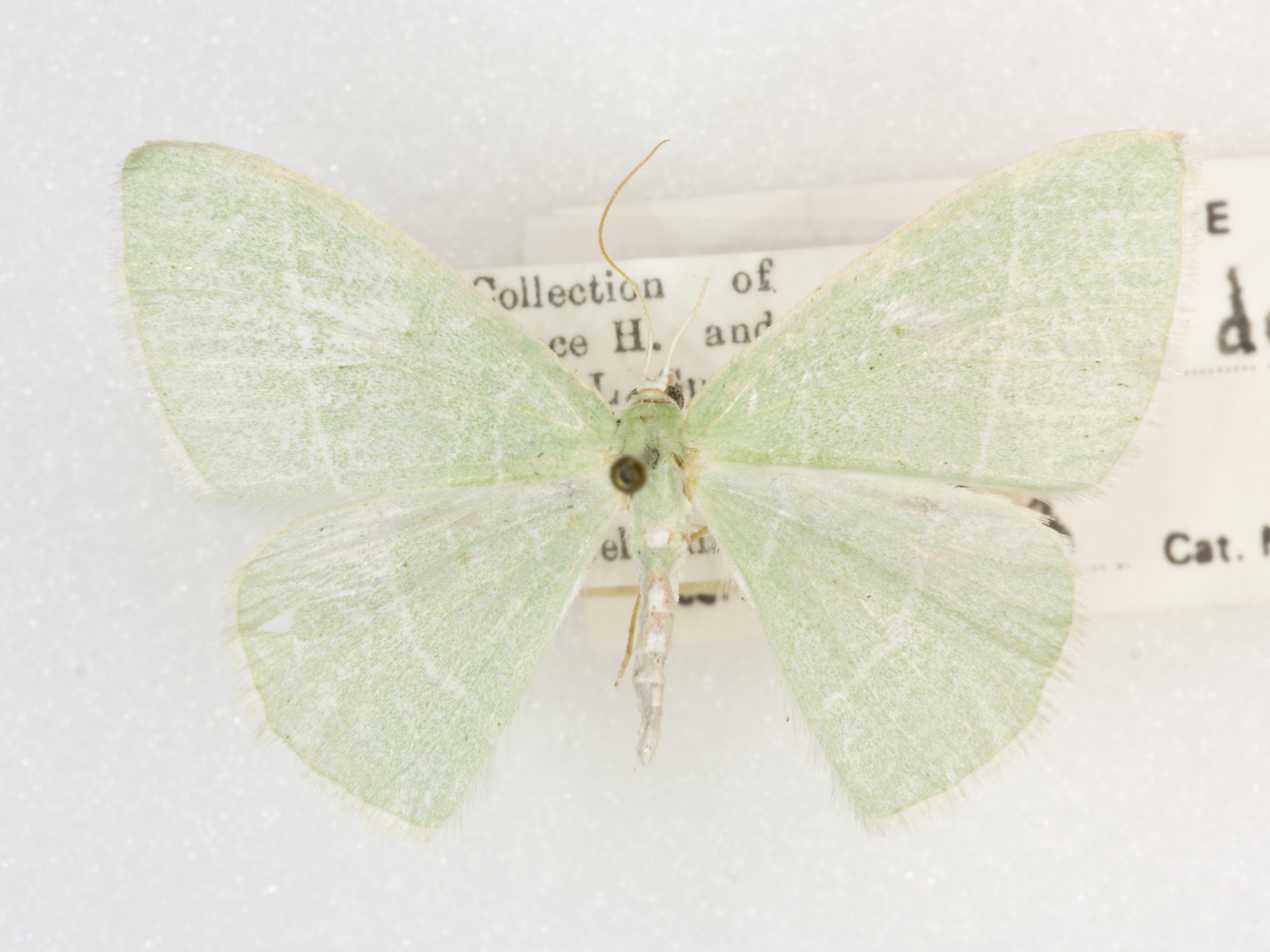
Nemoria darwiniata, Idaho

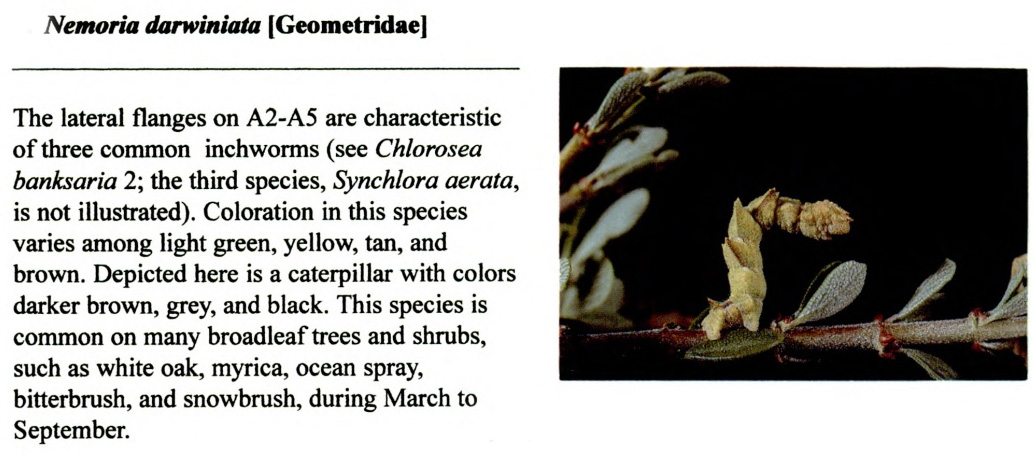
Nemoria daewiniata caterpillar
