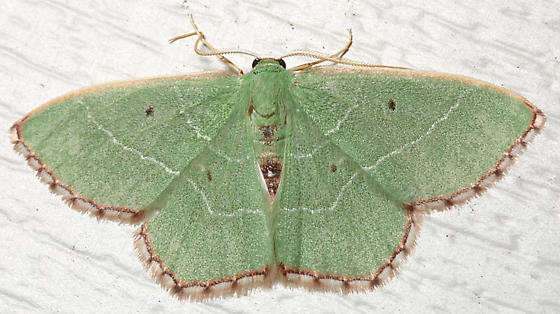
- Nemoria saturiba

Scientific classification
- Domain: Eukaryota
- Kingdom: Animalia
- Phylum: Arthropoda
- Class: Insecta
- Order: Lepidoptera
- Family: Geometridae
- Subfamily: Geometrinae
- Tribe: Nemoriini; Gumppenberg, 1887

Genera
- See text

Synonyms
- Nemorinae Gumppenberg, 1887; Ochrognesiini Inoue, 1961

= Nemoriini =

Tribe of moths

Nemoriini are tribes of geometer moths in the subfamily Geometrinae.

== Selected genera ==
Some other geometrine genera still remain unassigned to a tribe, and a few of those might also belong to the list below.

- Chlorosea
- Dichorda
- Nemoria
- Ochrognesia
- Phrudocentra
