= List of Lepidoptera of Cuba =

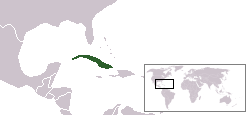
Location of Cuba

Lepidoptera of Cuba consist of both the butterflies and moths recorded from the island of Cuba.

According to a recent estimate, there are about of 1,557 Lepidoptera species present on the island.

== Butterflies ==
=== Papilionoidea ===
==== Papilionidae ====
===== Papilioninae =====
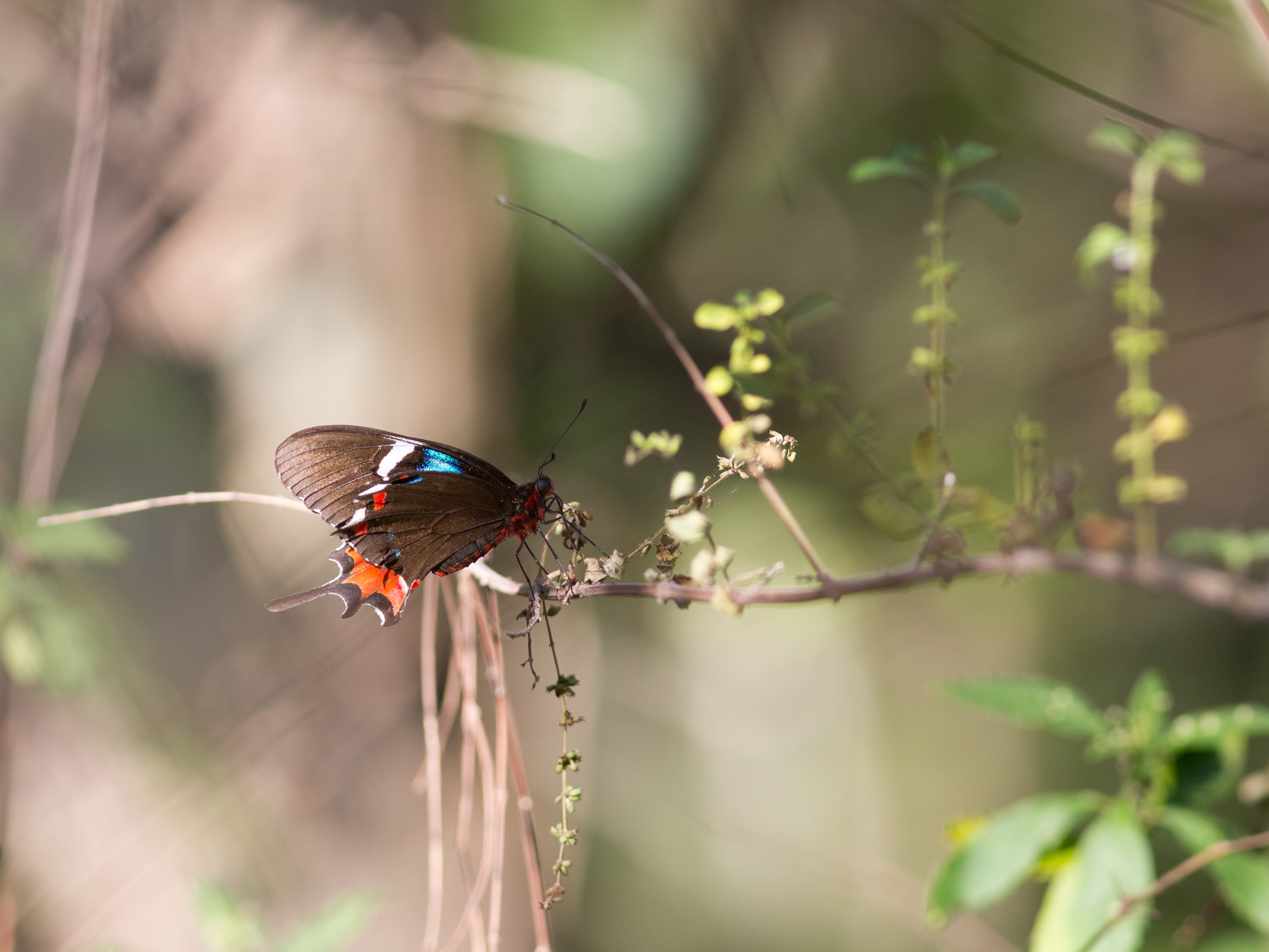
Parides gundlachianus

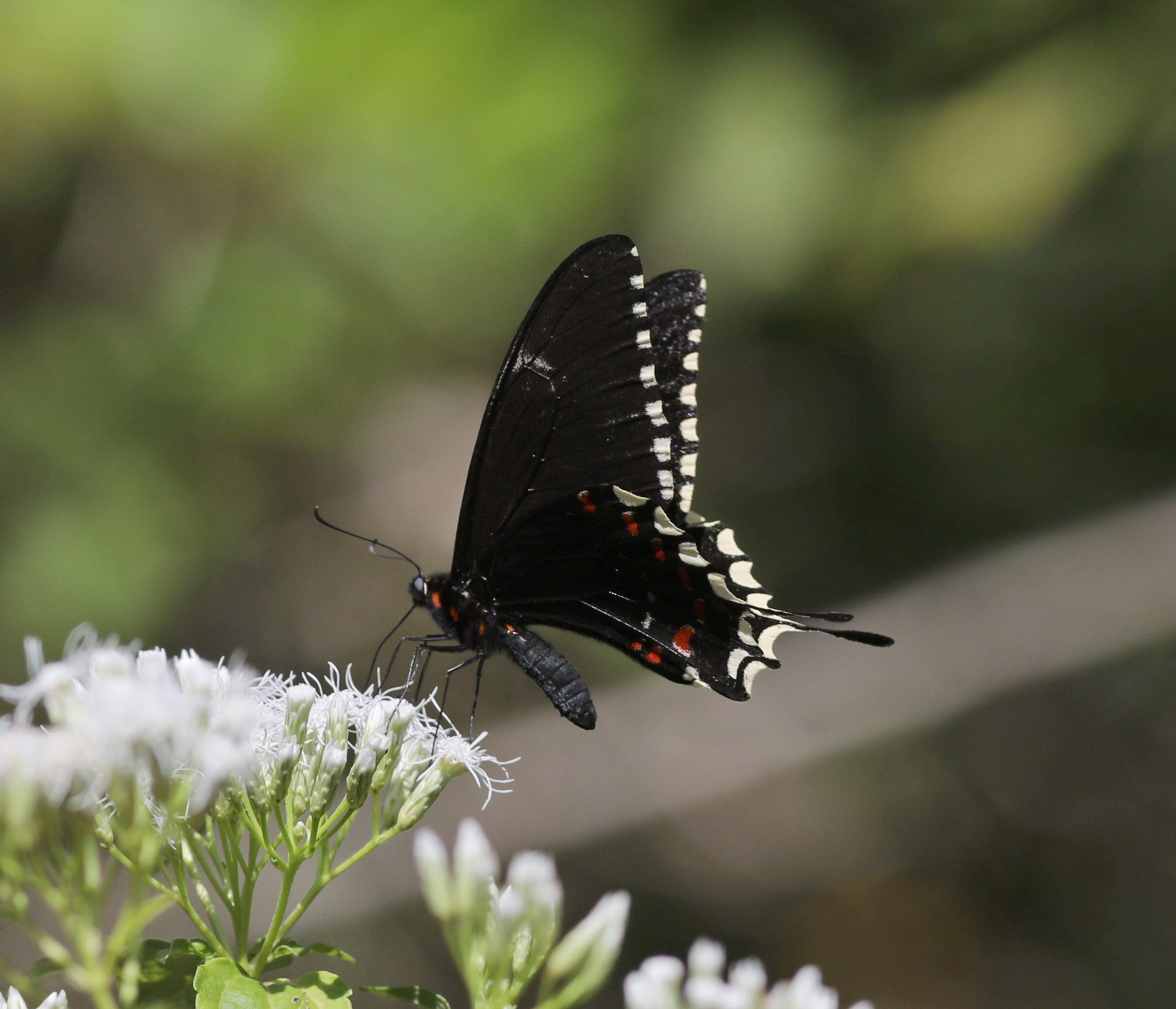
Heraclides oxynius

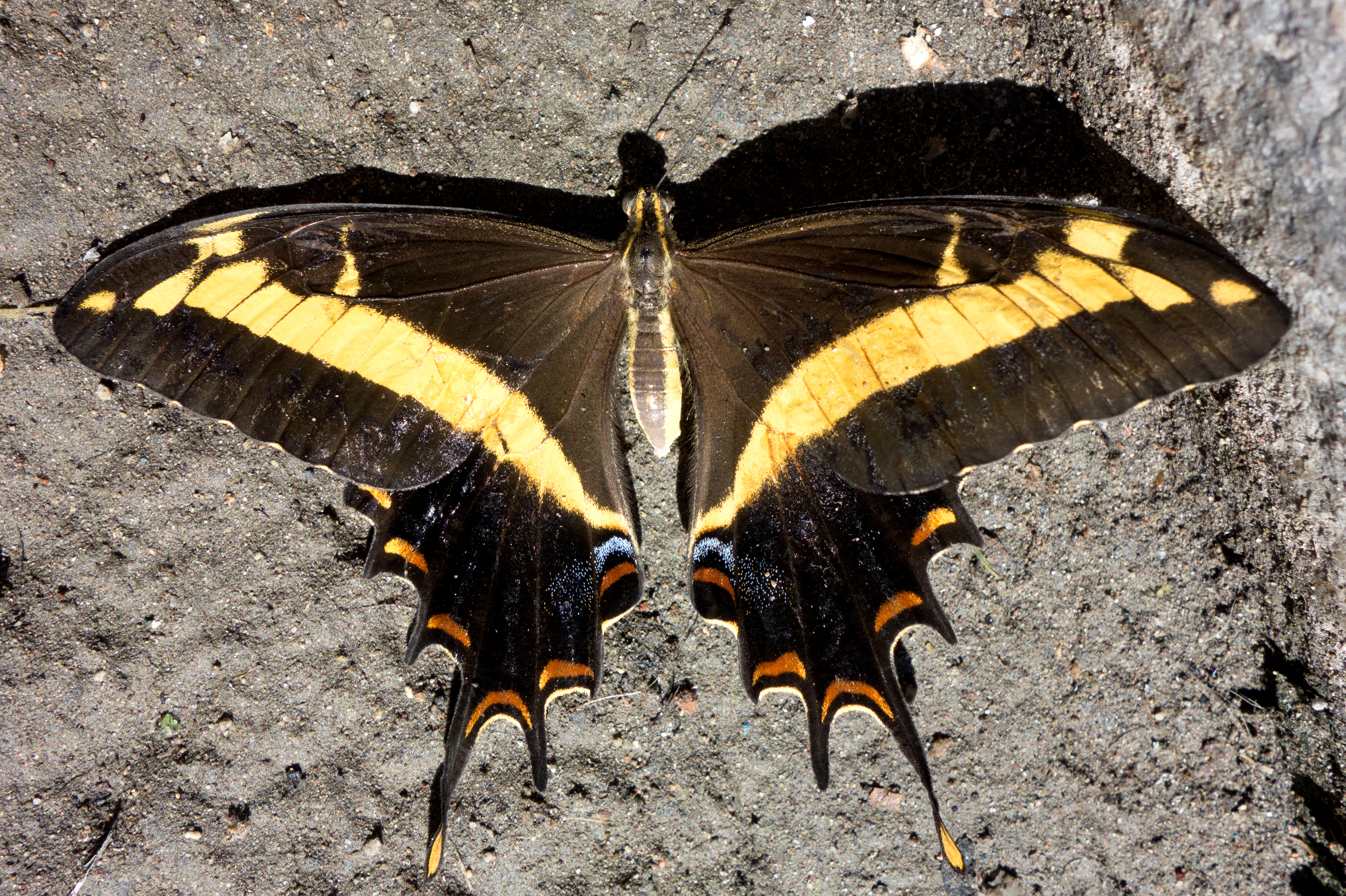
Heraclides andraemon

- Battus devilliersii (Godart, 1823)
- Battus polydamas (Dufrane, 1946)
- Eurytides celadon (Lucas, 1852)
- Heraclides andraemon Hübner, [1823]
- Heraclides androgeus (Godman & Salvin, 1890)
- Heraclides aristodemus (Esper, 1794)
- Heraclides caiguanabus (Poey, [1852])
- Heraclides oxynius (Geyer, 1827)
- Heraclides pelaus (Bates, 1935)
- Heraclides thoas (Gundlach, 1866)
- Papilio demoleus Linnaeus, 1758
- Papilio polyxenes Fabricius, 1775
- Parides gundlachianus (Felder & Felder, 1864)
- Pterourus palamedes (Drury, 1773)
- Pterourus troilus (Linnaeus, 1758)

==== Hesperiidae ====
===== Hesperiinae =====
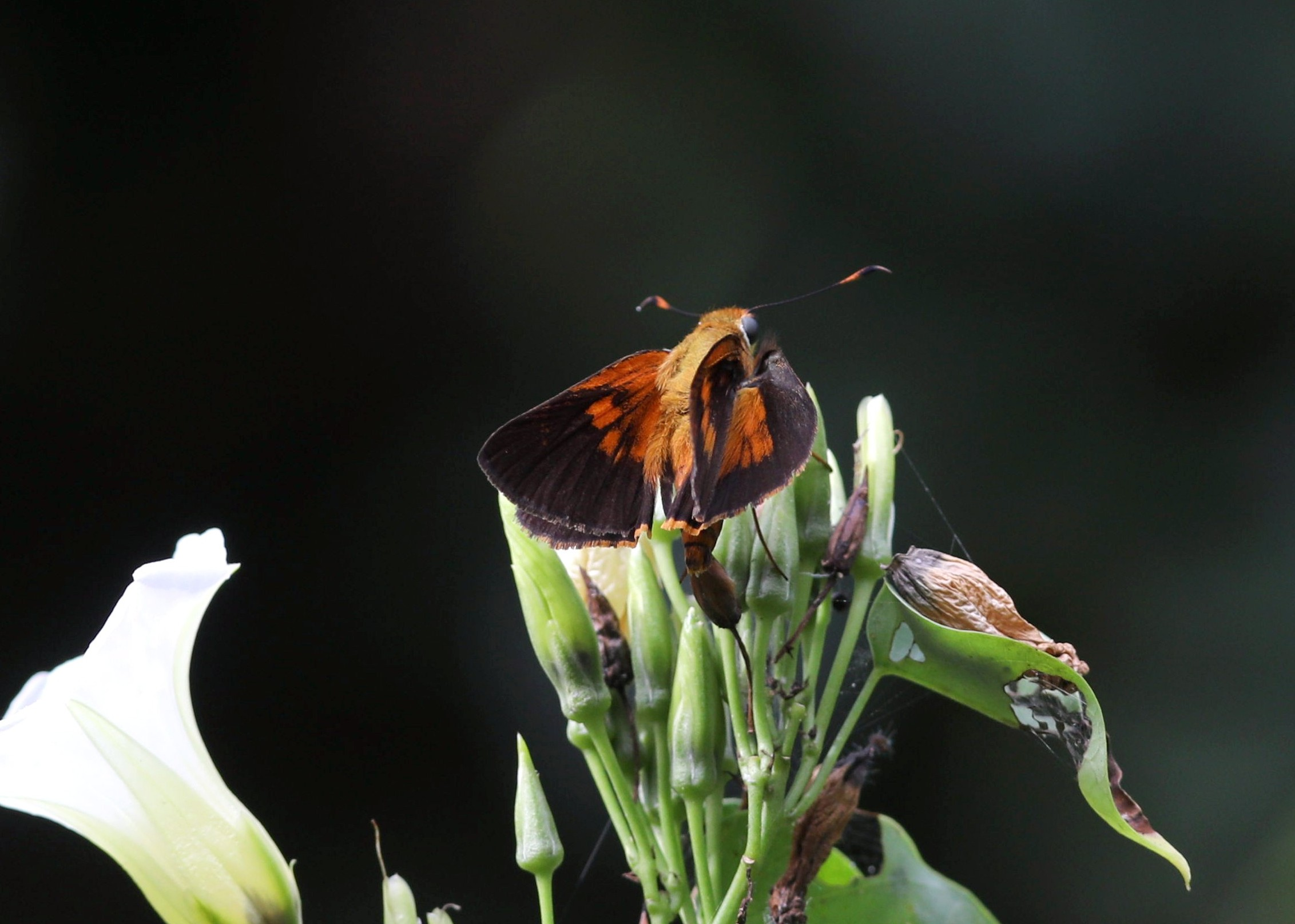
Choranthus orientis

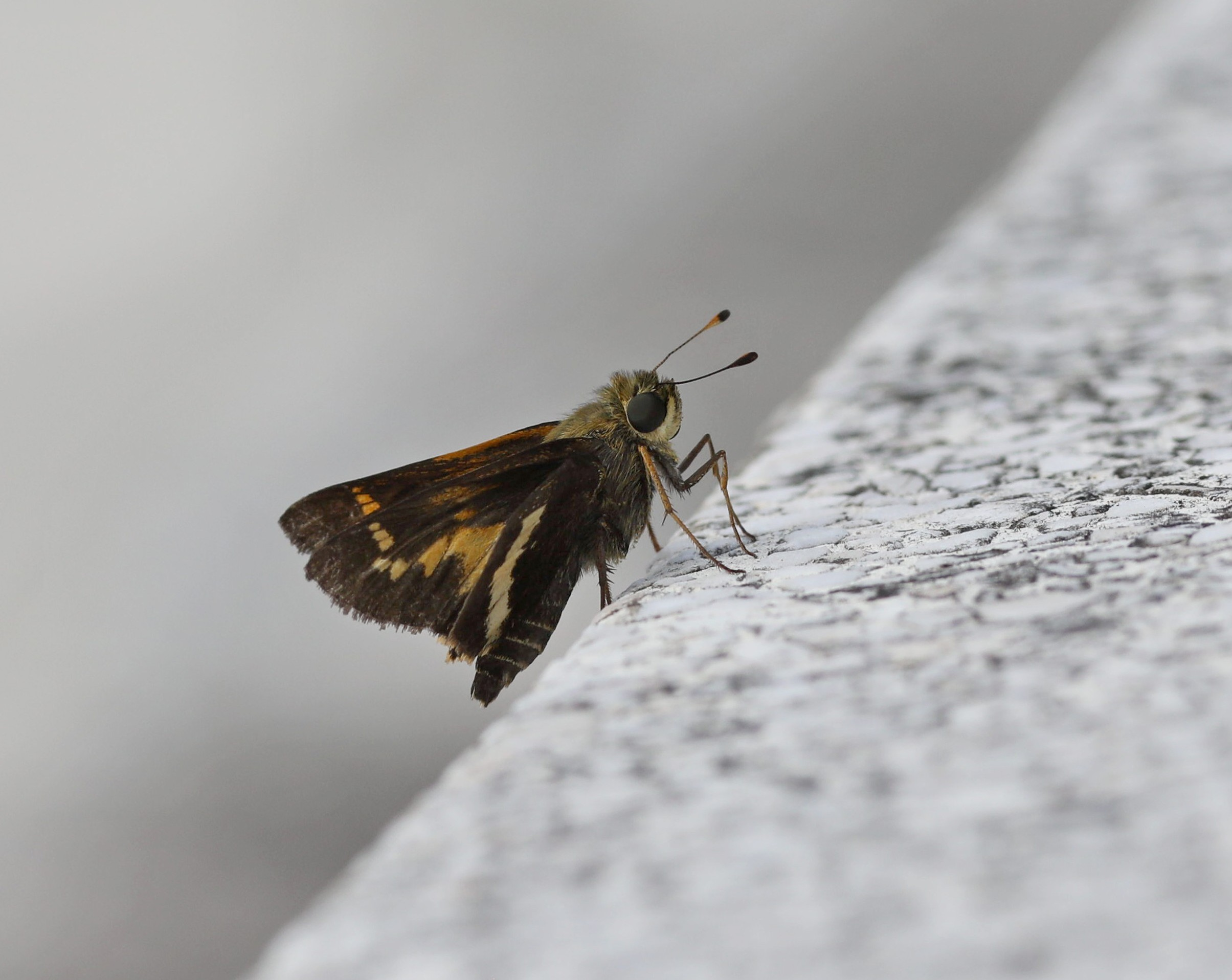
Atalopedes mesogramma

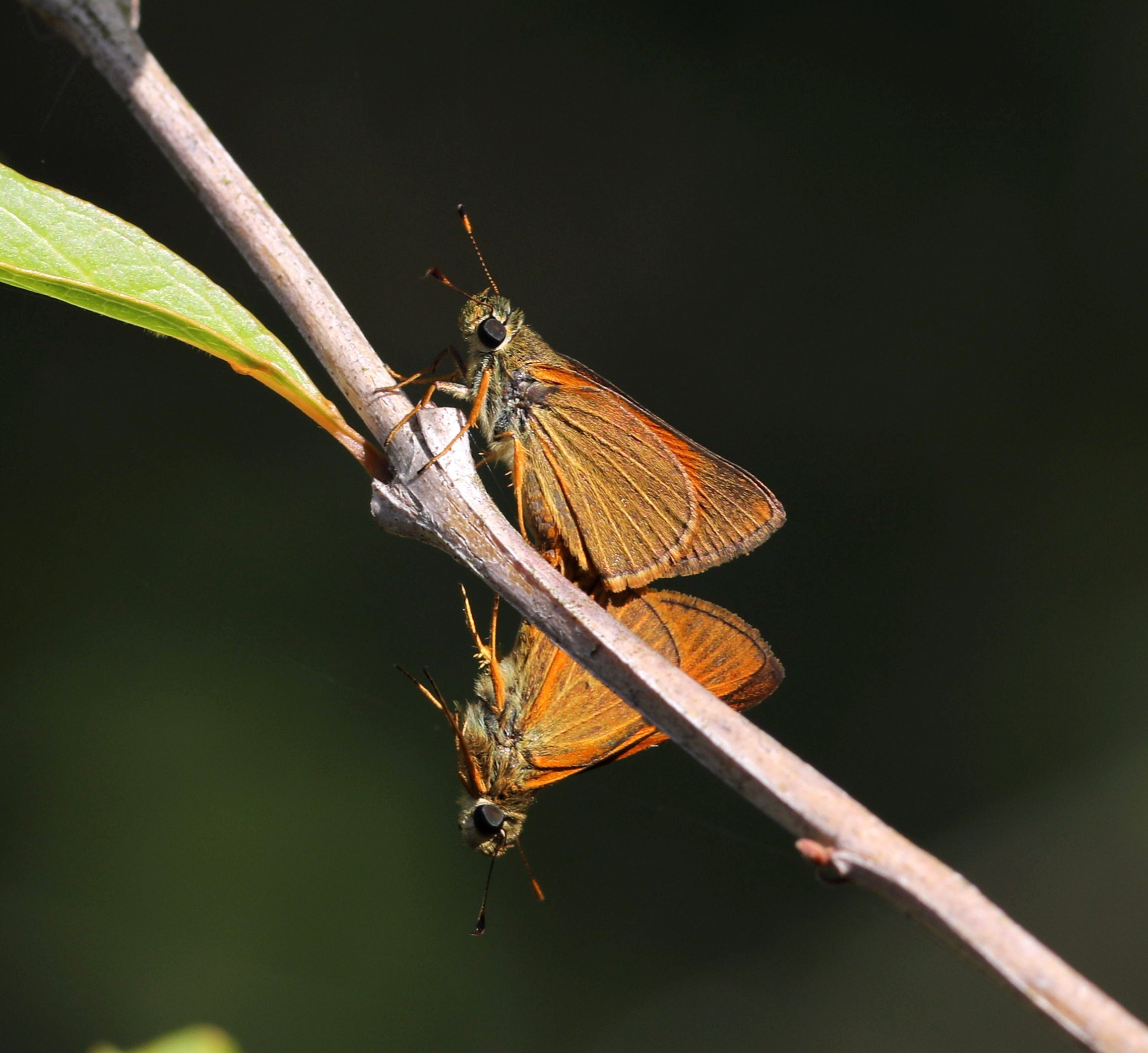
Choranthus radians

- Asbolis capucinus (Lucas, 1857)
- Atalopedes mesogramma (Latreille, [1824])
- Calpodes ethlius (Stoll, 1782)
- Choranthus orientis (Herrich-Schäffer, 1863)
- Choranthus radians (Lucas, 1857)
- Cymaenes tripunctus (Herrich-Schäffer, 1865)
- Euphyes cornelius (Latreille, [1824])
- Euphyes singularis (Herrich-Schäffer, 1865)
- Holguinia holguin Evans, 1955
- Hylephila phyleus (Drury, 1773)
- Lerodea eufala (Edwards, 1869)
- Nyctelius nyctelius (Latreille, [1824])
- Oarisma bruneri Bell, 1959
- Oarisma nanus (Herrich-Schäffer, 1865)
- Panoquina corrupta (Herrich-Schäffer, 1865)
- Panoquina lucas (Fabricius, 1793)
- Panoquina ocola (Edwards, 1863)
- Panoquina panoquinoides (Skinner, 1891)
- Parachoranthus magdalia (Herrich-Schäffer, 1863)
- Perichares philetes (Gmelin, 1790)
- Polites baracoa (Lucas, 1857)
- Rhinthon cubana (Herrich-Schäffer, 1865)
- Saliana esperi Smith & Hernández, 1992
- Synapte malitiosa (Herrich-Schäffer, 1865)
- Wallengrenia otho (Lucas, 1857)

===== Pyrginae =====
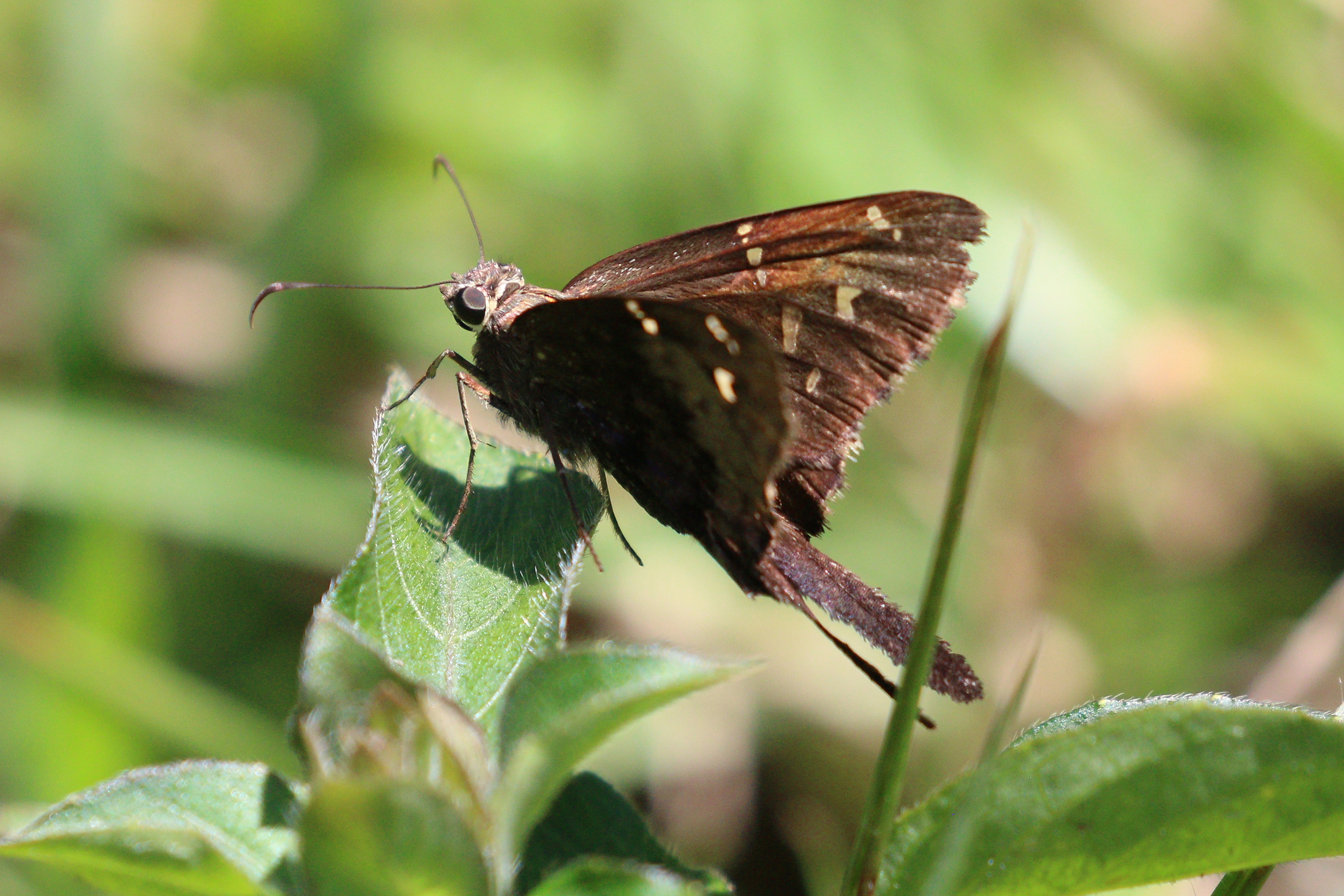
Cecropterus dorantes

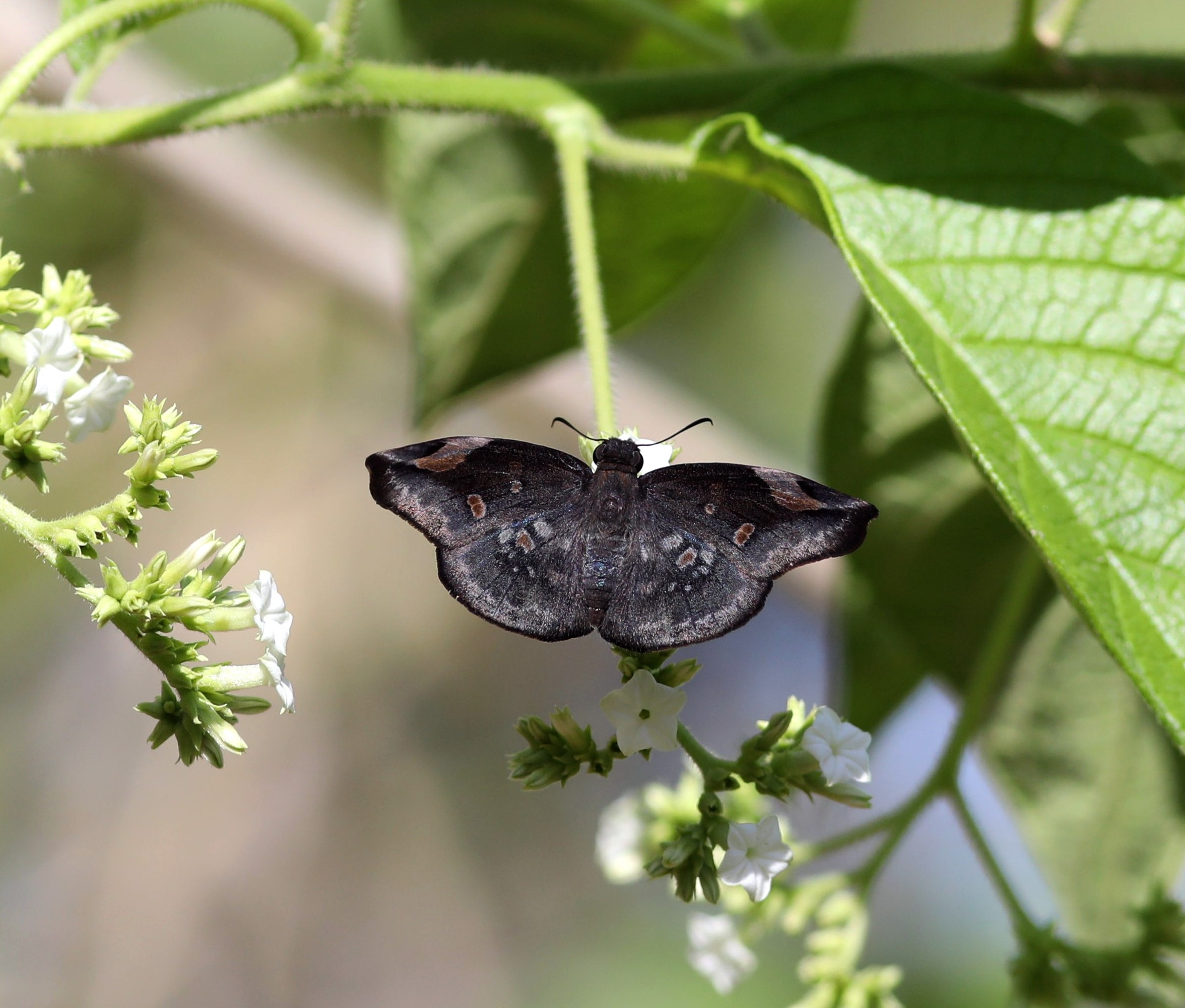
Eantis papinianus

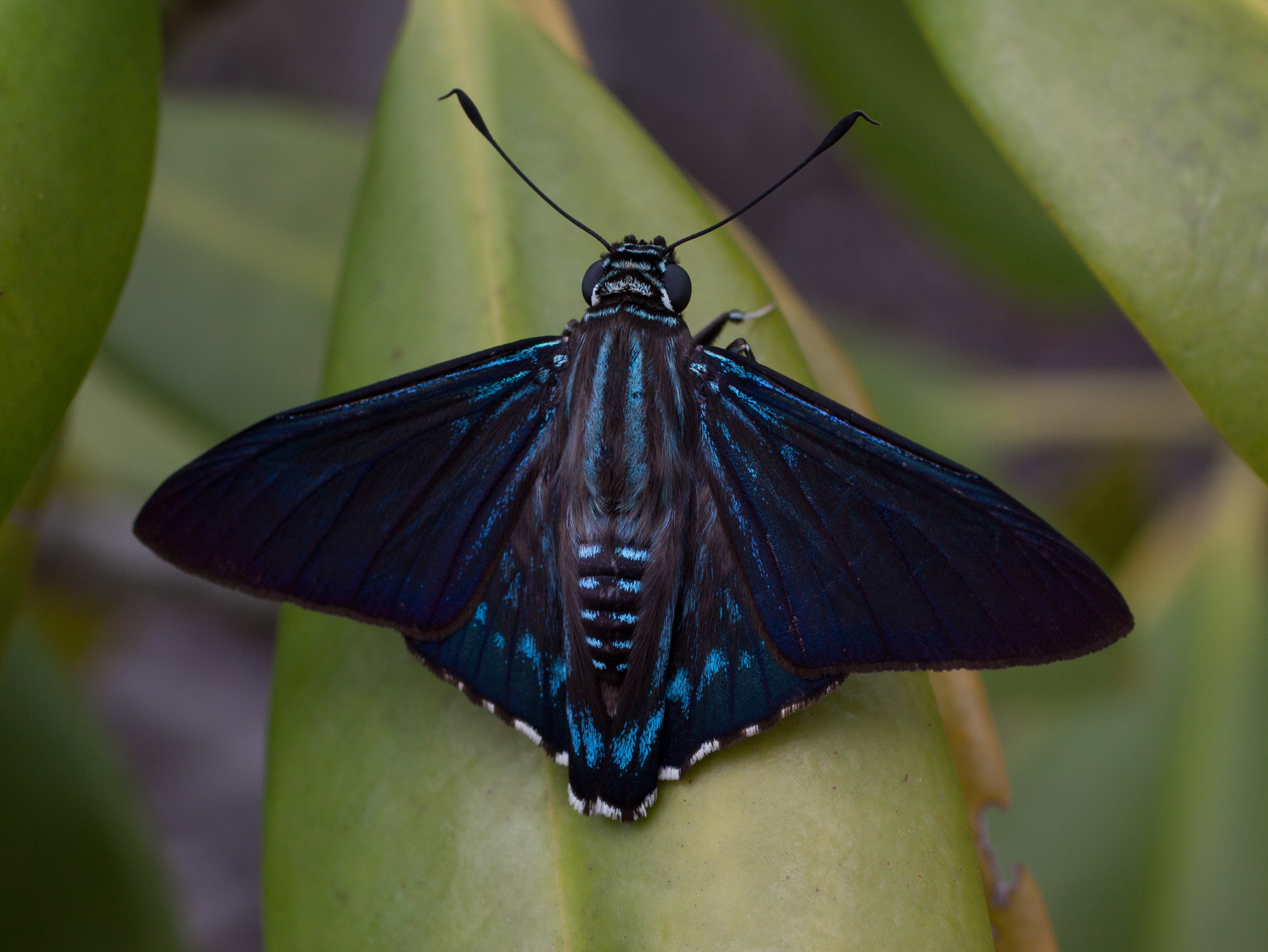
Phocides pigmalion

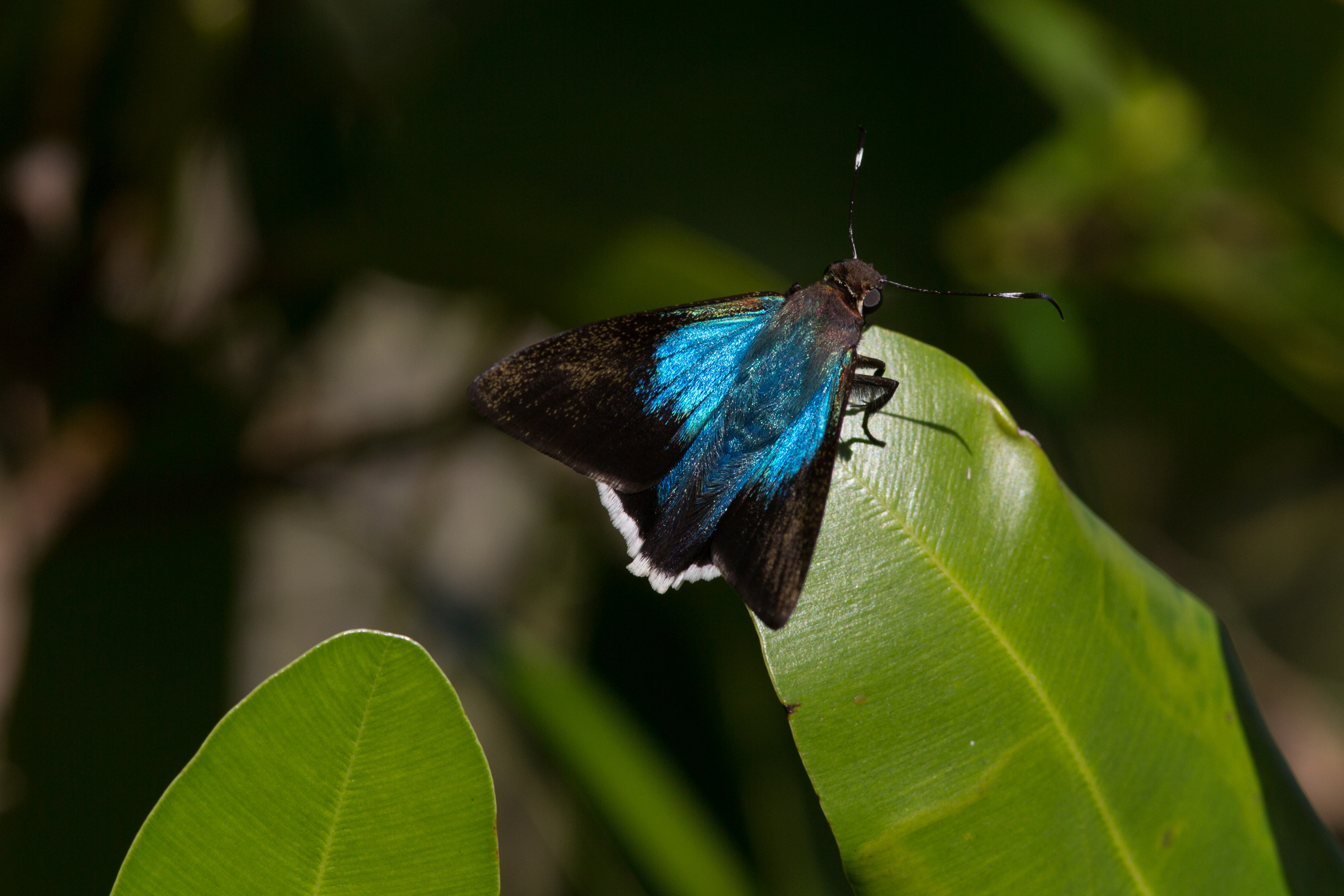
Astraptes habana

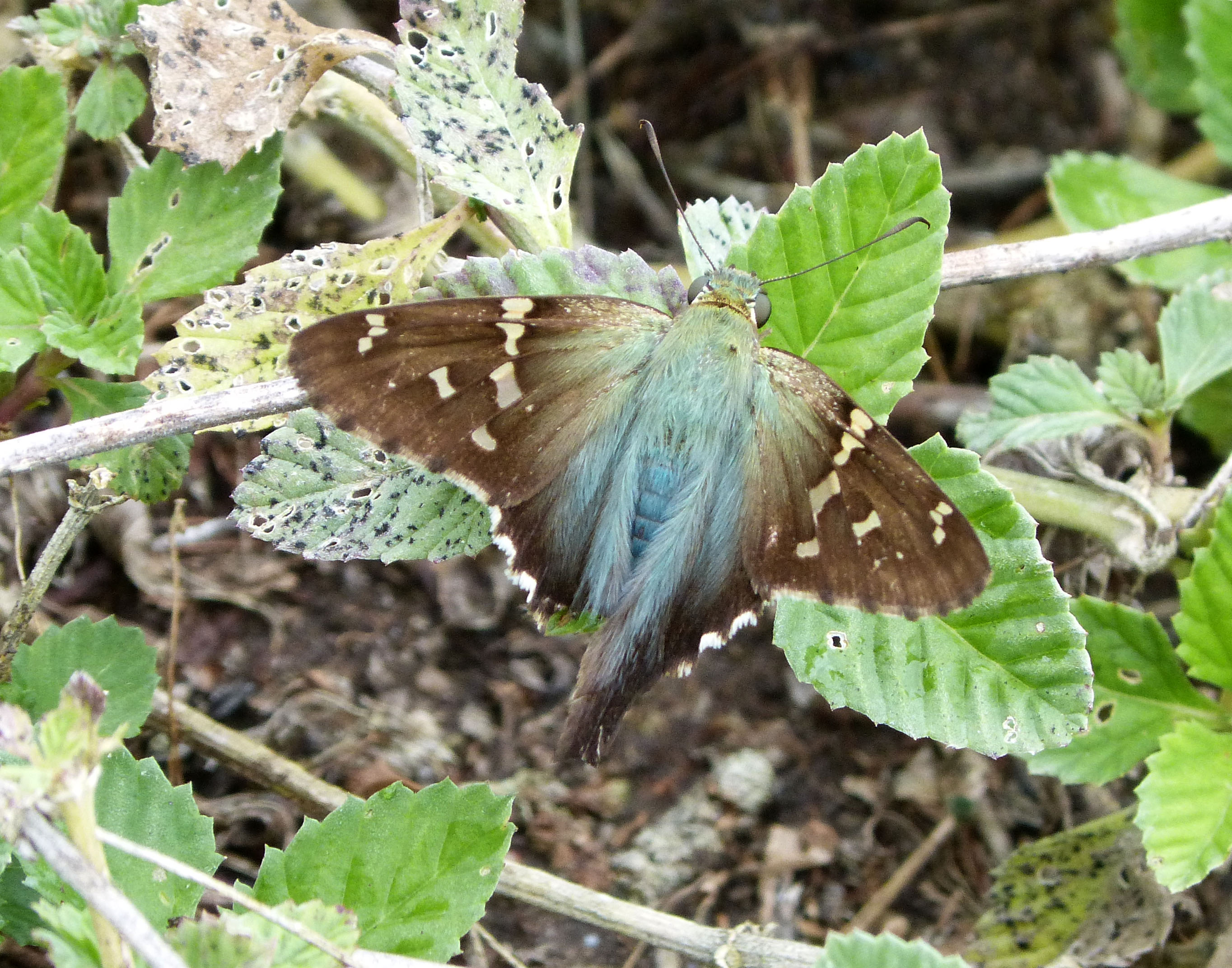
Urbanus proteus

- Aguna asander (Mabille & Bouillet, 1912)
- Aguna claxon Evans, 1952
- Anastrus sempiternus (Bell & Comstock, 1948)
- Astraptes anaphus (Godman & Salvin, 1896)
- Astraptes cassander (Fabricius, 1793)
- Astraptes habana (Lucas, 1857)
- Astraptes talus (Cramer, 1799)
- Astraptes xagua (Lucas, 1857)
- Autochton cellus (Boisduval & Leconte, 1833)
- Burca braco (Herrich-Schäffer, 1865)
- Burca concolor (Herrich-Schäffer, 1865)
- Burca cubensis (Skinner, 1913)
- Cabares potrillo (Lucas, 1857)
- Carystoides mexicana Freeman, 1969
- Chioides marmorosa (Herrich-Schäffer, 1865)
- Chiomara gundlachi (Möschler, 1878)
- Eantis papinianus (Poey, 1832)
- Eantis munroei (Bell, 1956)
- Epargyreus zestos (Geyer, 1832)
- Ephyriades arcas (Fabricius, 1775)
- Ephyriades brunnea (Herrich-Schäffer, 1865)
- Ephyriades zephodes (Hübner, 1820)
- Erynnis zarucco (Lucas, 1857)
- Gesta gesta (Herrich-Schäffer, 1863)
- Ouleus fridericus (Geyer, 1832)
- Phocides pigmalion (Lucas, 1857)
- Polygonus leo (Gmelin, [1790])
- Proteides maysi (Lucas, 1857)
- Proteides mercurius (Lucas, 1857)
- Pyrgus crisia (Herrich-Schäffer
- Pyrgus oileus (Linnaeus, 1767)
- Cecropterus dorantes (Lucas, 1857)
- Urbanus proteus (Scudder, 1872)

==== Pieridae ====
===== Coliadinae =====
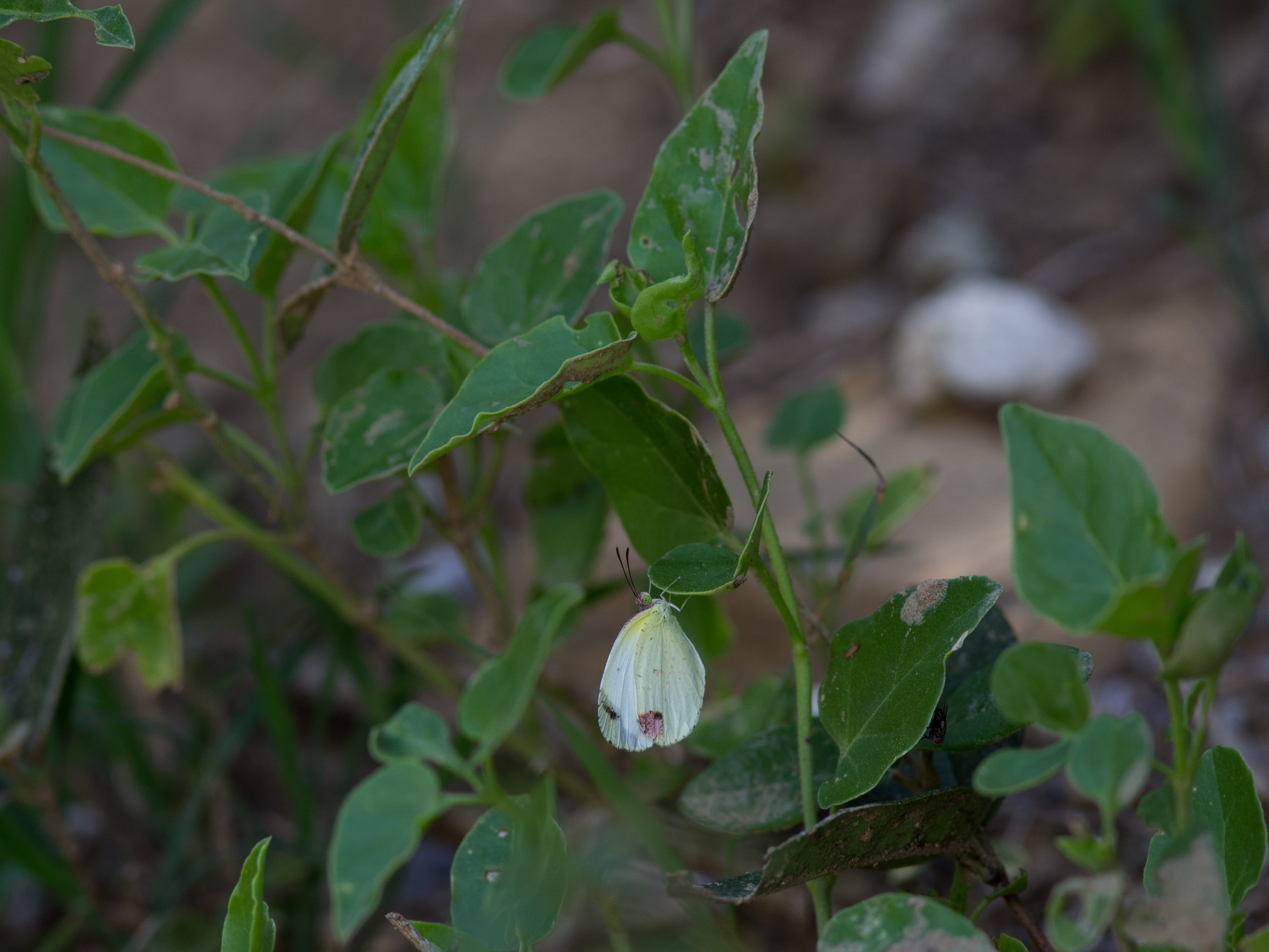
Pyrisitia messalina

- Abaeis nicippe (Cramer, 1779)
- Anteos clorinde (Godart, [1824])
- Anteos maerula (Fabricius, 1775)
- Aphrissa neleis (Boisduval, 1836)
- Aphrissa statira d´Almeida, 1939
- Colias eurytheme Boisduval, 1852
- Eurema amelia (Poey, 1853)
- Eurema boisduvaliana (Felder & Felder, 1865)
- Eurema daira (Godart, 1819)
- Eurema elathea (Cramer, 1777)
- Eurema lucina (Poey, 1853)
- Kricogonia cabrerai Ramsden, 1920
- Kricogonia lyside (Godart, 1819)
- Nathalis iole Boisduval, 1836
- Phoebis agarithe Brown, 1929
- Phoebis argante (Butler, 1869)
- Phoebis avellaneda (Herrich-Schäffer, 1864)
- Phoebis philea (Johansson, 1763)
- Phoebis sennae (Linnaeus, 1758)
- Pyrisitia chamberlaini (Bates, 1934)
- Pyrisitia dina (Poey, 1832)
- Pyrisitia larae (Herrich-Schäffer, 1862)
- Pyrisitia lisa (Ménétriés, 1832)
- Pyrisitia messalina (Fabricius, 1787)
- Pyrisitia nise (Cramer, 1775)
- Pyrisitia proterpia (Fabricius, 1775)
- Pyrisitia venusta (Dillon, 1947)
- Zerene cesonia (Stoll, 1790)

===== Dismorphiinae =====
- Dismorphia cubana (Herrich-Schäffer, 1862)

===== Pierinae =====
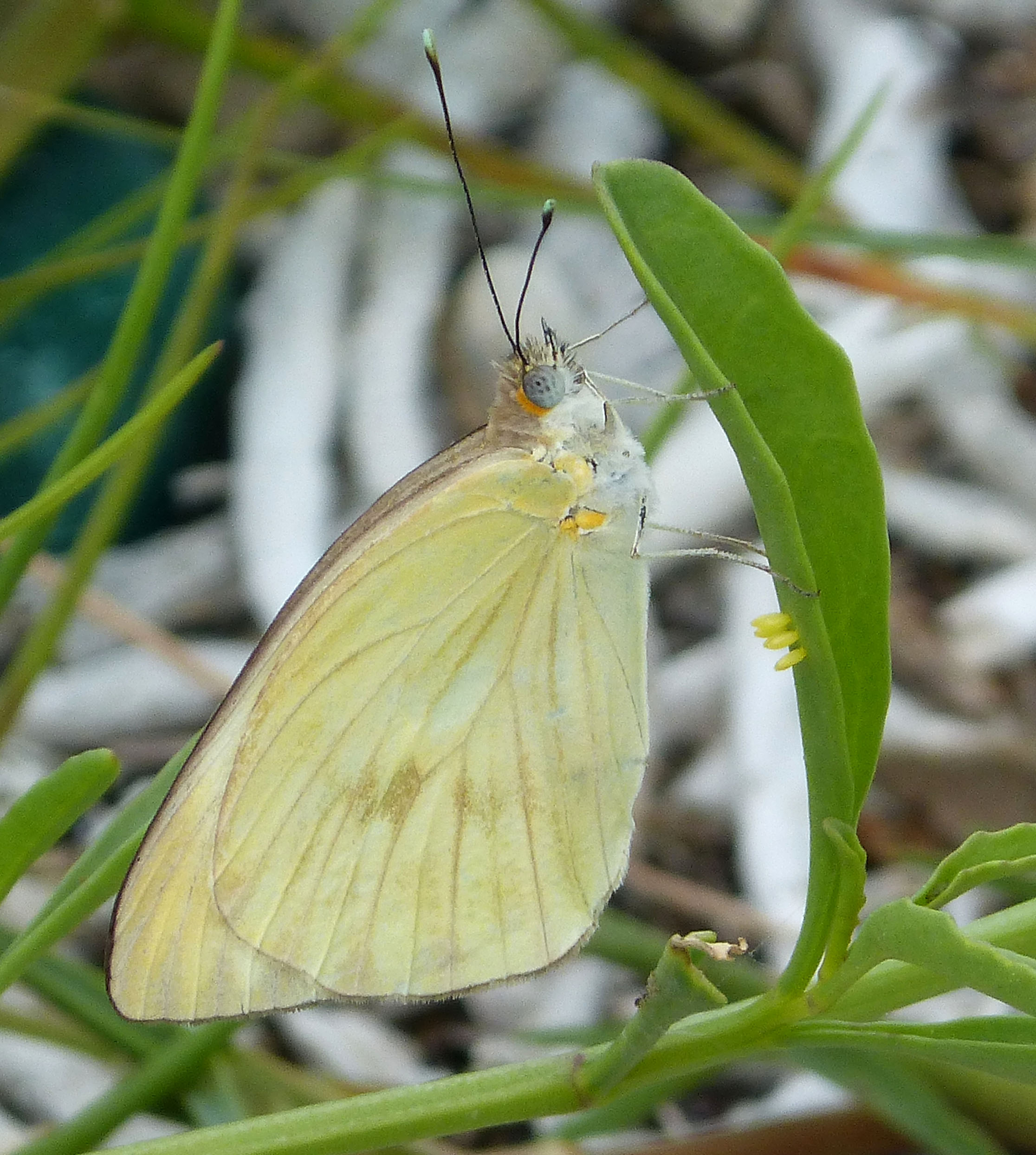
Ascia monuste

- Ascia monuste (Fabricius, 1775)
- Ganyra menciae (Ramsden, 1915)
- Glutophrissa drusilla (Butler, 1872)
- Melete salacia Fruhstorfer, 1908
- Pontia protodice (Boisduval & Leconte, 1833)

==== Riodinidae ====
- Dianesia carteri (Holland, 1902)

==== Lycaenidae ====
===== Theclinae =====
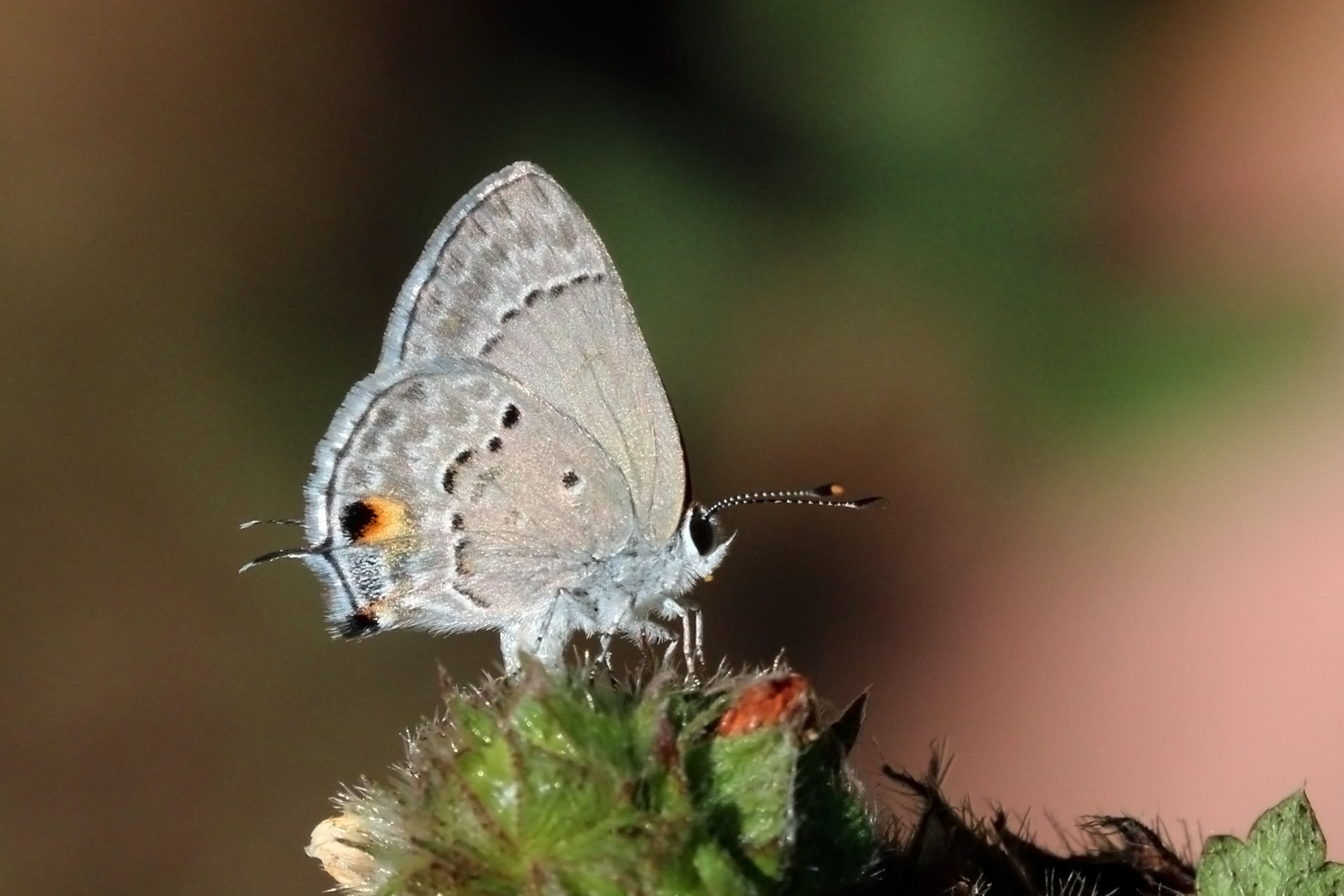
Strymon istapa

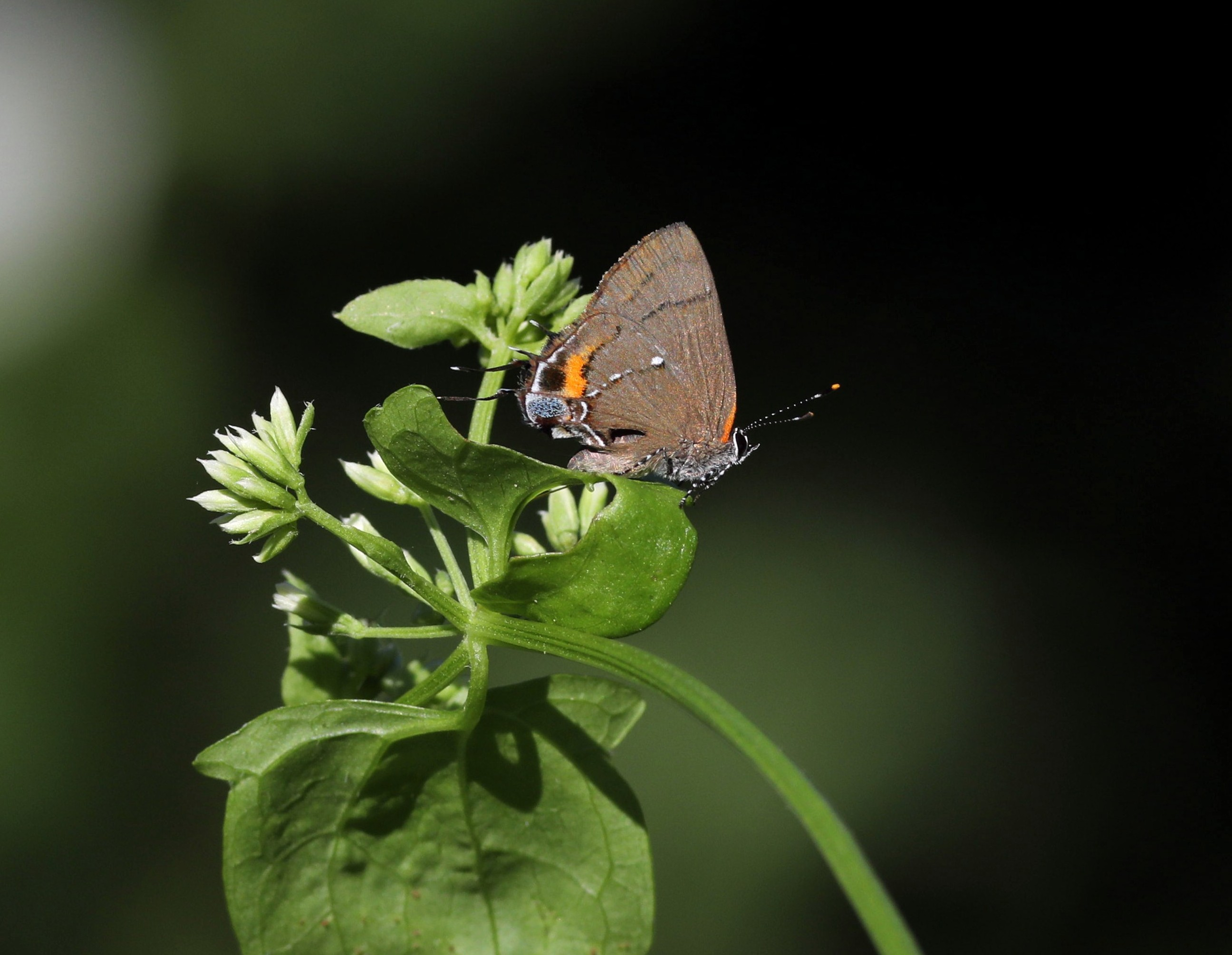
Electrostrymon angelia

- Allosmaitia coelebs (Herrich-Schäffer, 1862)
- Chlorostrymon maesites (Herrich-Schäffer, 1865)
- Chlorostrymon simaethis (Drury, 1770)
- Electrostrymon angelia (Hewitson, 1874)
- Eumaeus atala (Poey, 1832)
- Ministrymon azia (Hewitson, 1873)
- Nesiostrymon celida (Lucas, 1857)
- Strymon acis (Comstock & Huntington, 1943)
- Strymon bazochii Bates, 1934
- Strymon istapa (Hewitson, 1874)
- Strymon limenia (Hewitson, 1868)
- Strymon martialis (Herrich-Schäffer, 1864)
- Strymon toussainti (Comstock & Hungtinton, 1943)
- Ziegleria hernandezi (Johnson & Kroenlein, 1993)

===== Polyommatinae =====
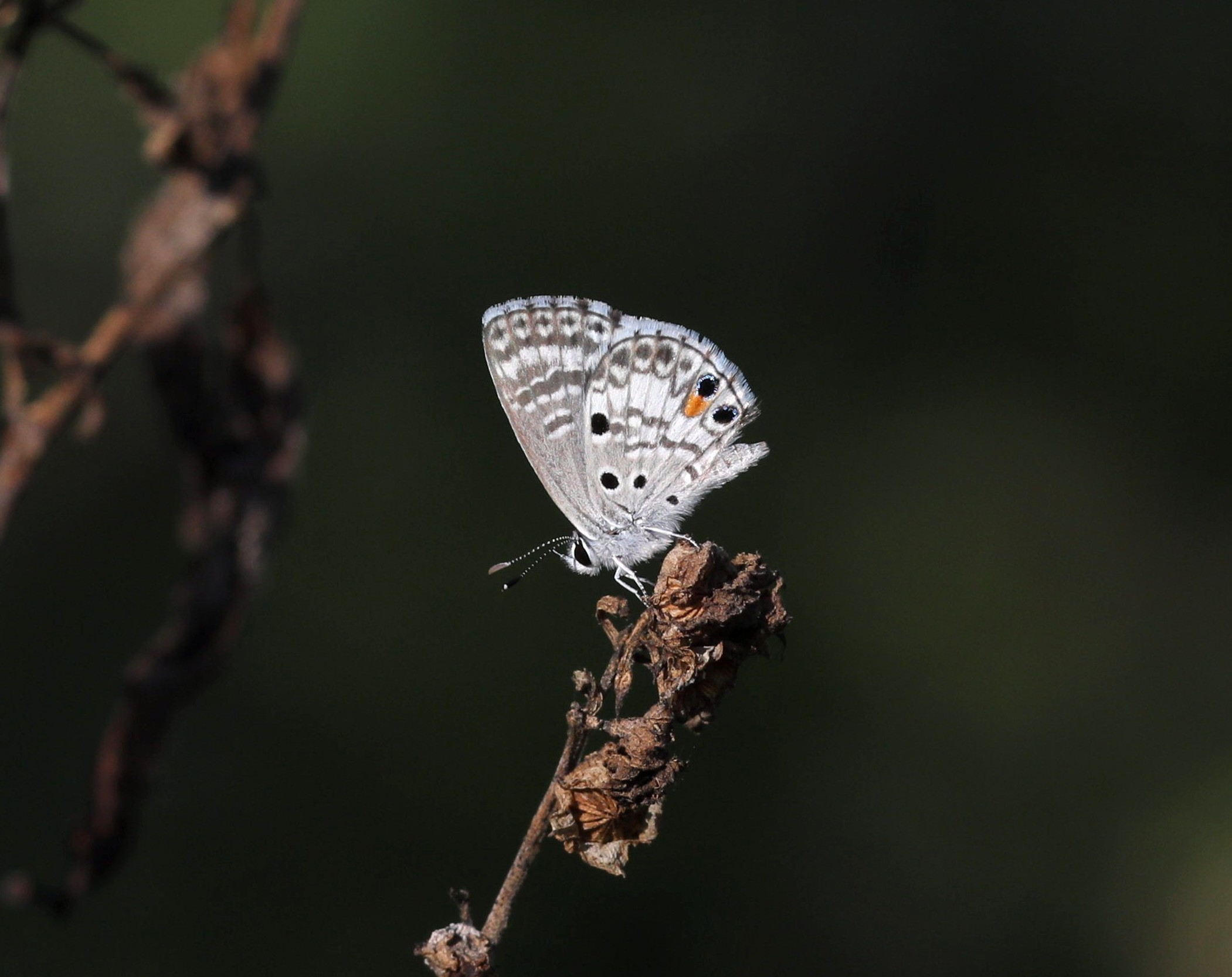
Cyclargus ammon

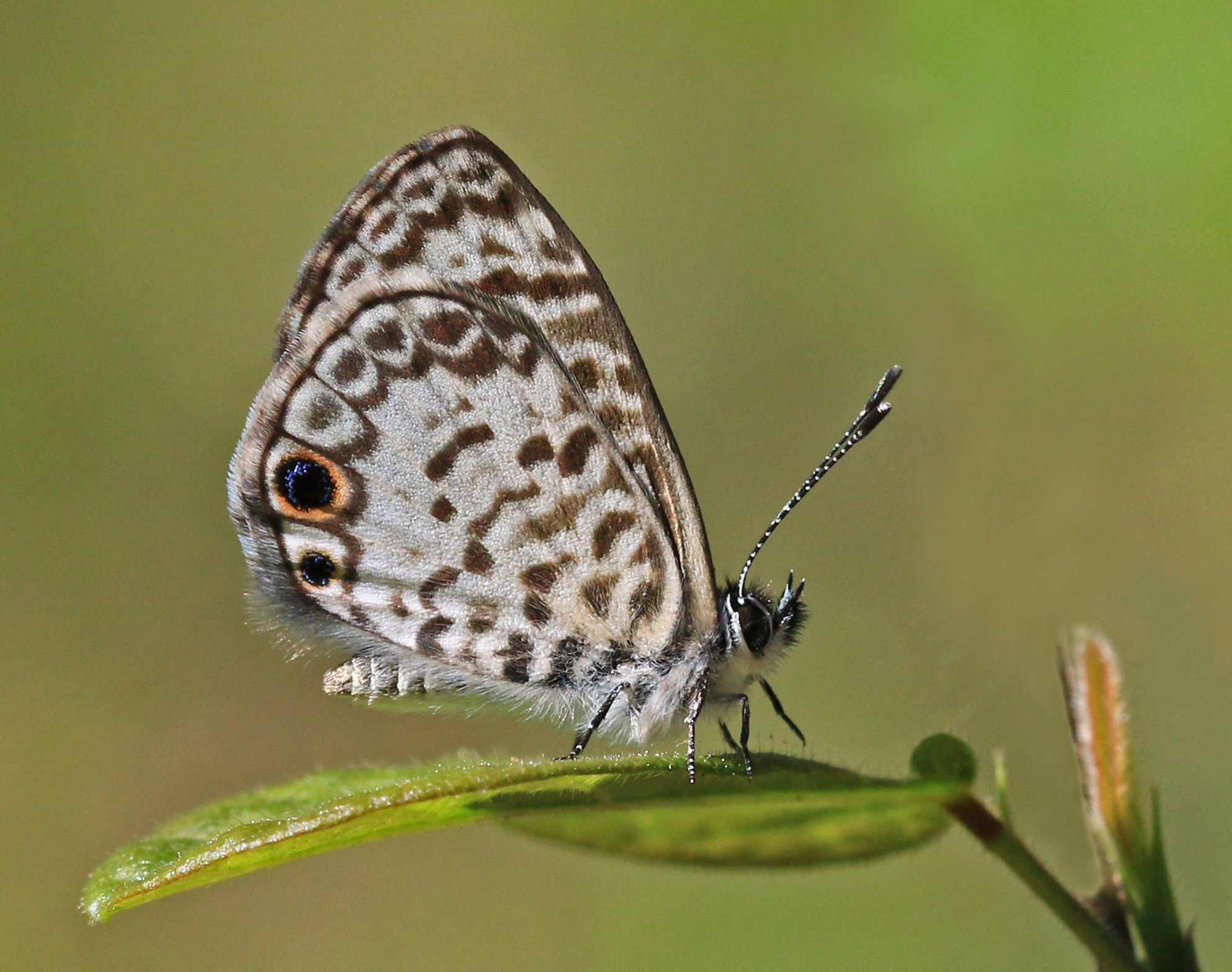
Leptotes cassius

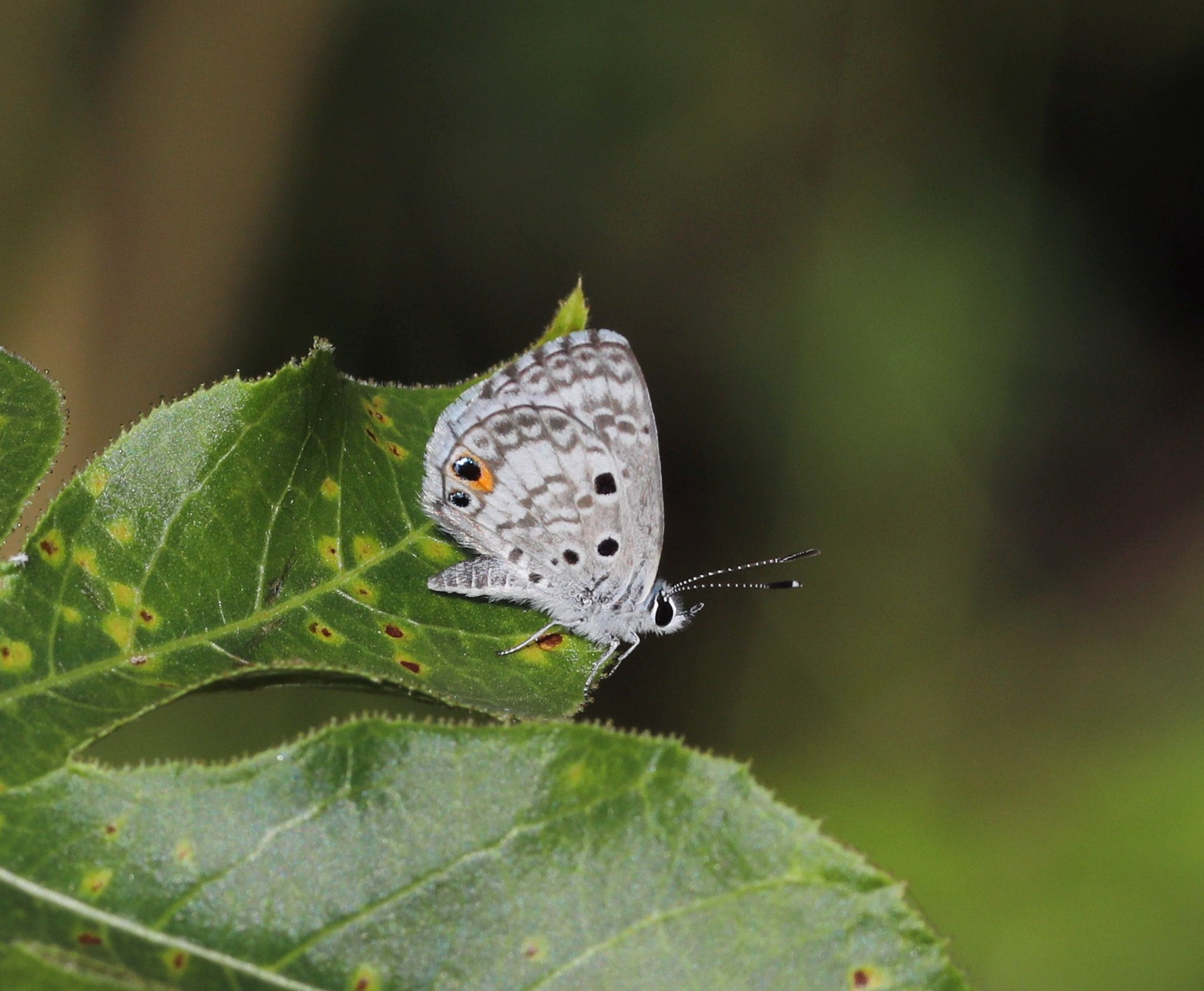
Cyclargus thomasi

- Brephidium exilis (Herrich-Schäffer, 1862)
- Cyclargus ammon (Lucas, 1857)
- Cyclargus thomasi (Clench, 1941)
- Hemiargus hanno (Poey, 1832)
- Leptotes cassius (Lucas, 1857)
- Leptotes hedgesi Schwartz & Johnson, 1992
- Pseudochrysops bornoi Smith & Hernández, 1992

==== Nymphalidae ====
===== Apaturinae =====
- Asterocampa idyja (Geyer, [1828])
- Doxocopa laure (Hübner, 1823)

===== Biblidinae =====
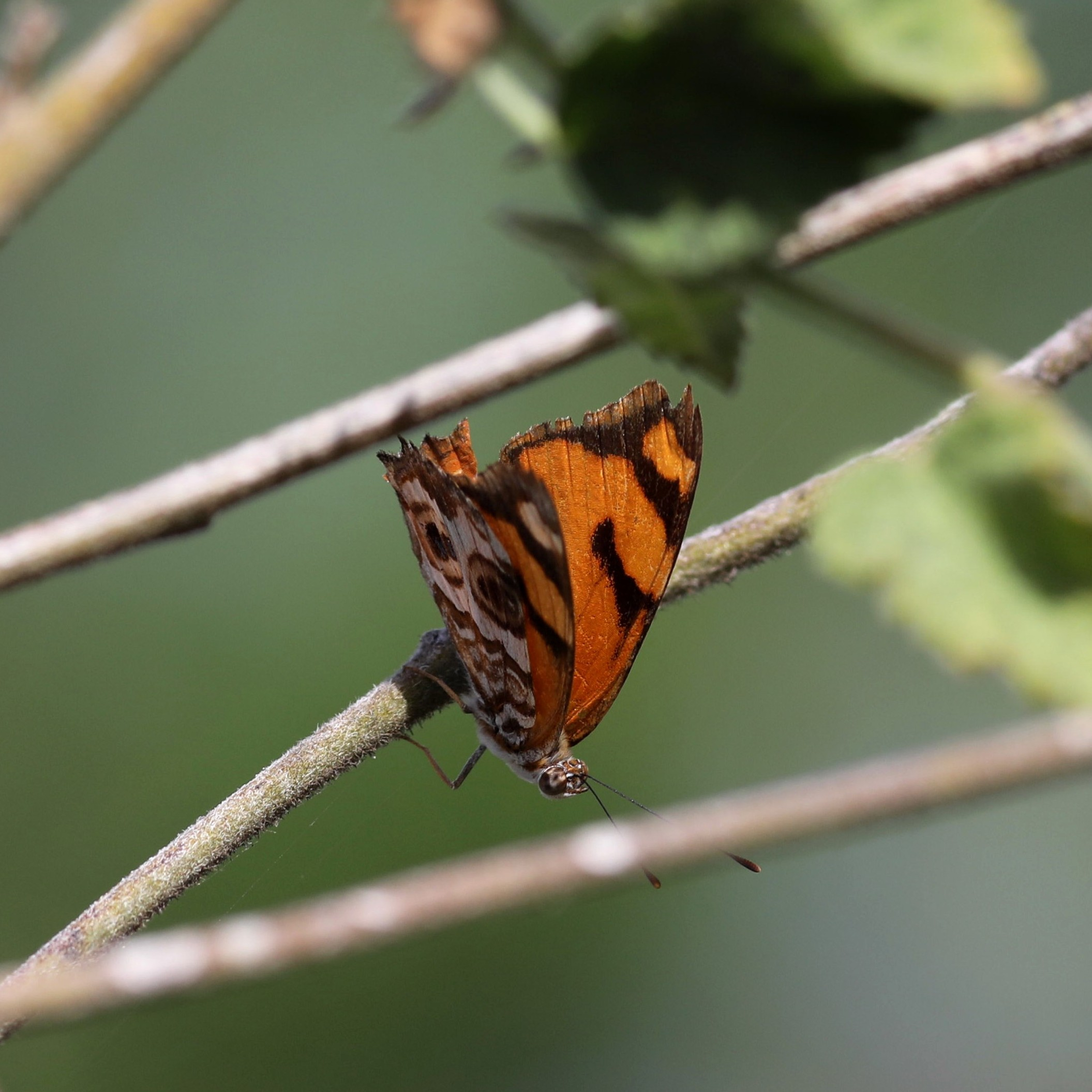
Lucinia sida

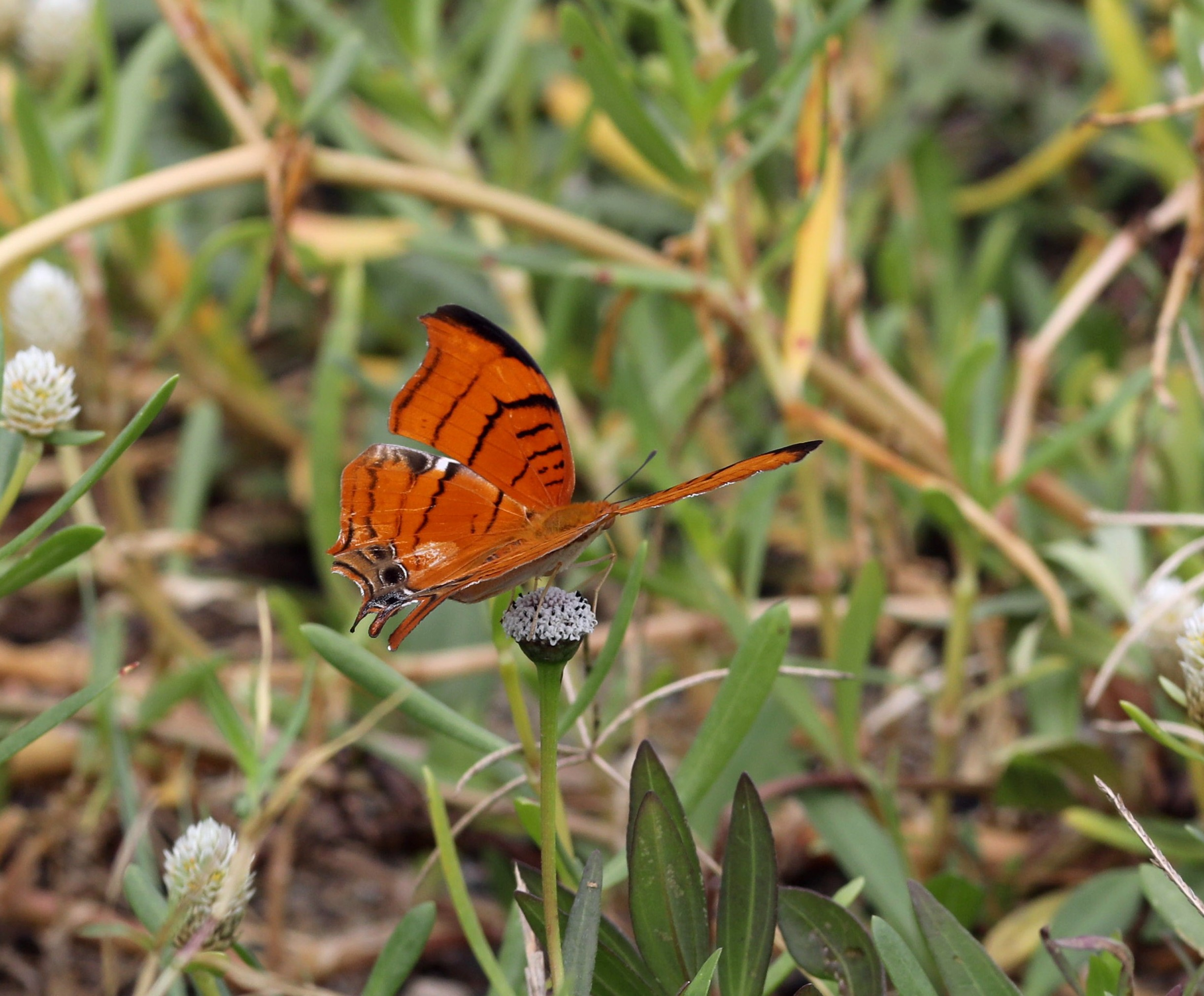
Marpesia eleuchea

- Dynamine serina Bates, 1934
- Dynamine postverta d'Almeida, 1952
- Eunica heraclitus (Poey, 1847)
- Eunica monima (Cramer, 1782)
- Eunica tatila Kaye, 1926
- Hamadryas amphichloe (Fruhstorfer, 1916)
- Hamadryas amphinome (Lucas, 1853)
- Hamadryas februa (Linnaeus, 1758)
- Lucinia sida Hübner, [1823]
- Marpesia chiron (Fabricius, 1775)
- Marpesia eleuchea (Hübner, 1818)

===== Charaxinae =====
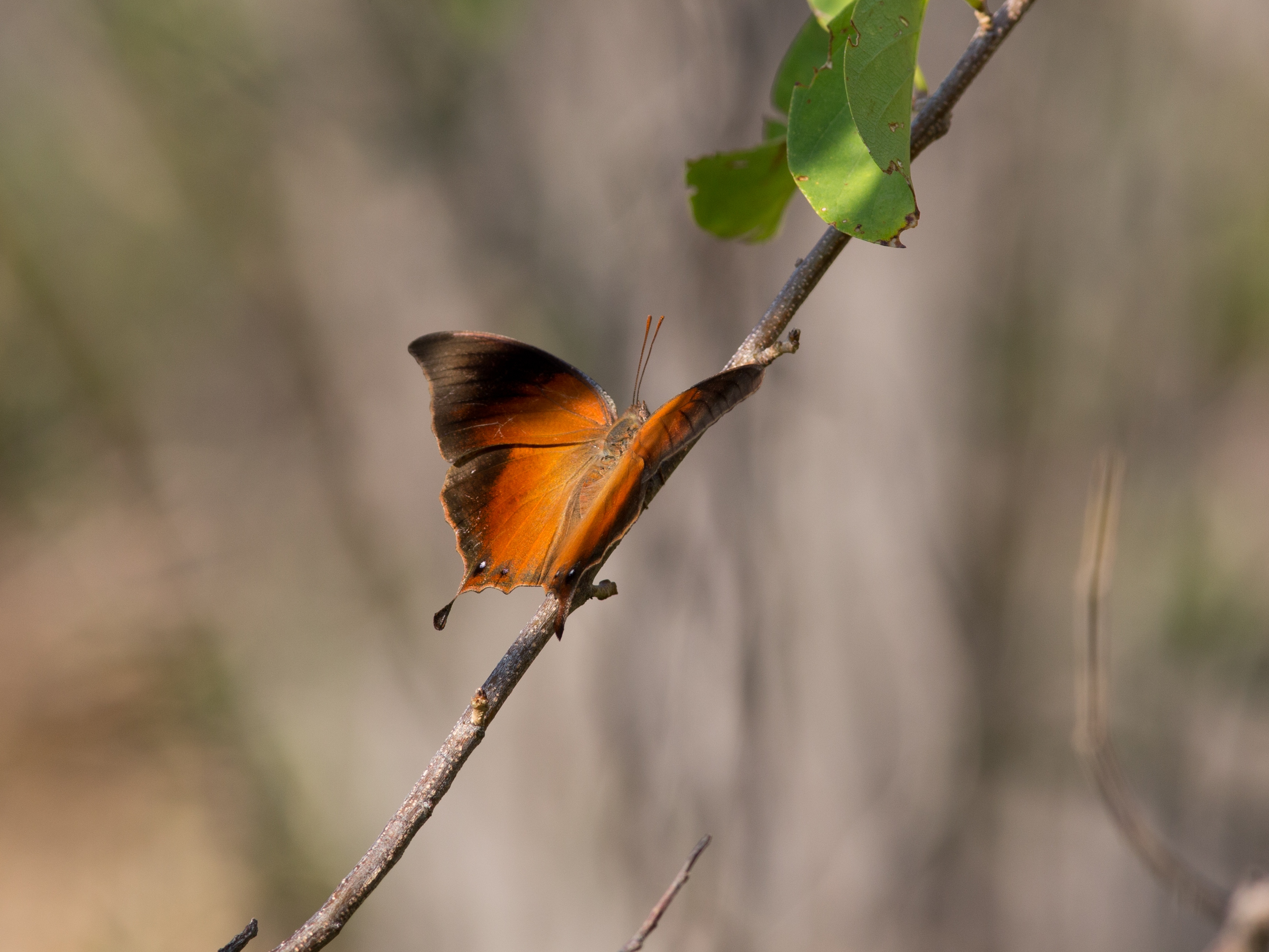
Memphis echemus

- Anaea cubana (Druce, 1905)
- Archaeoprepona demophon (Fruhstorfer, 1904)
- Hypna clytemnestra (Herrich-Schäffer, 1862)
- Memphis verticordia (Doubleday, [1849])
- Memphis echemus (Doubleday, [1849])
- Siderone galanthis (Illiger, 1802)

===== Danainae =====
- Anetia briarea Hübner, 1823
- Anetia cubana (Salvin, 1869)
- Anetia pantherata (Hall, 1925)
- Danaus eresimus Forbes, 1943
- Danaus gilippus (Cramer, 1779)
- Danaus plexippus (Linnaeus, 1758)
- Greta cubana (Herrich-Schäffer, 1862)
- Lycorea halia Felder & Felder, 1865

===== Heliconiinae =====
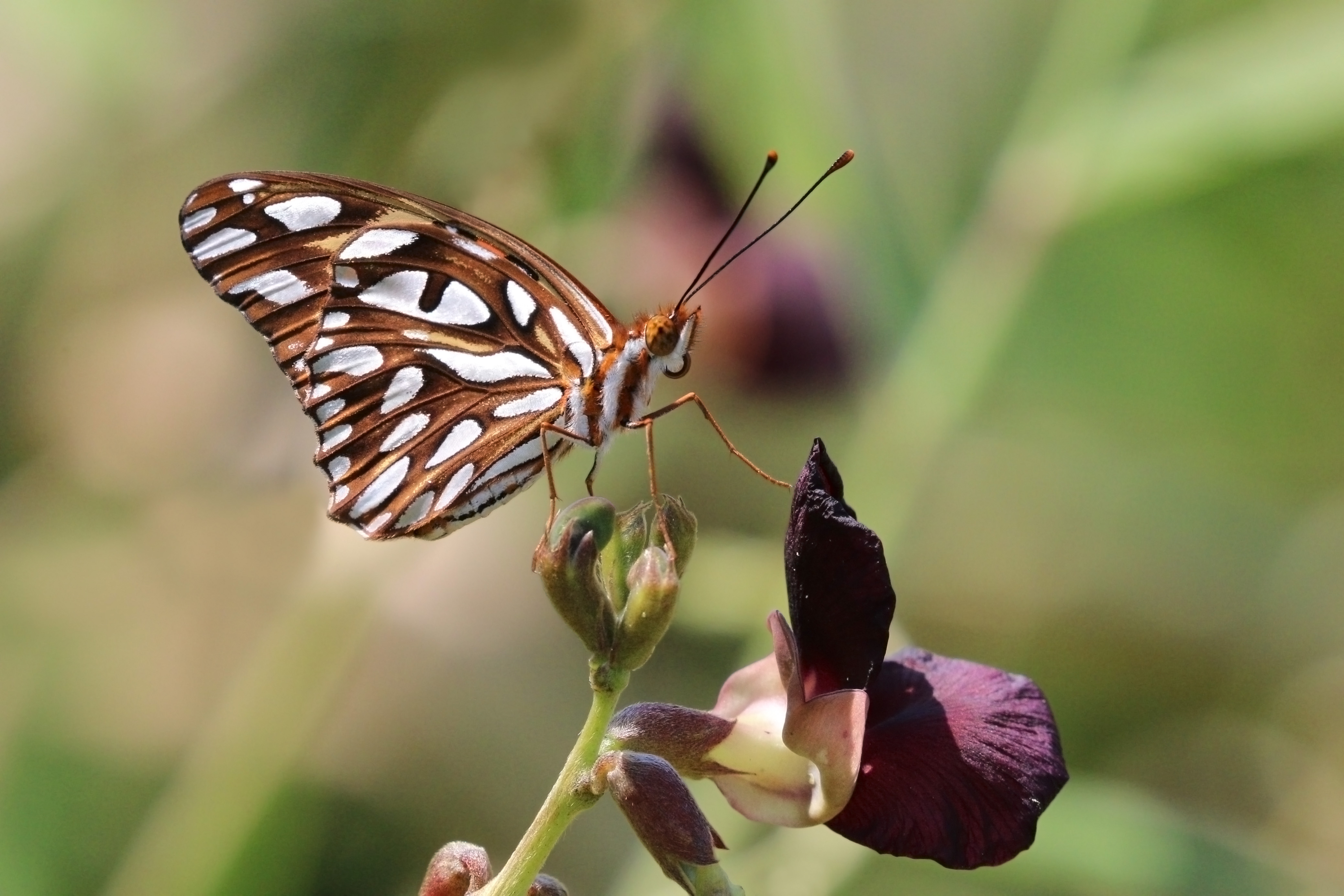
Agraulis vanillae insularis

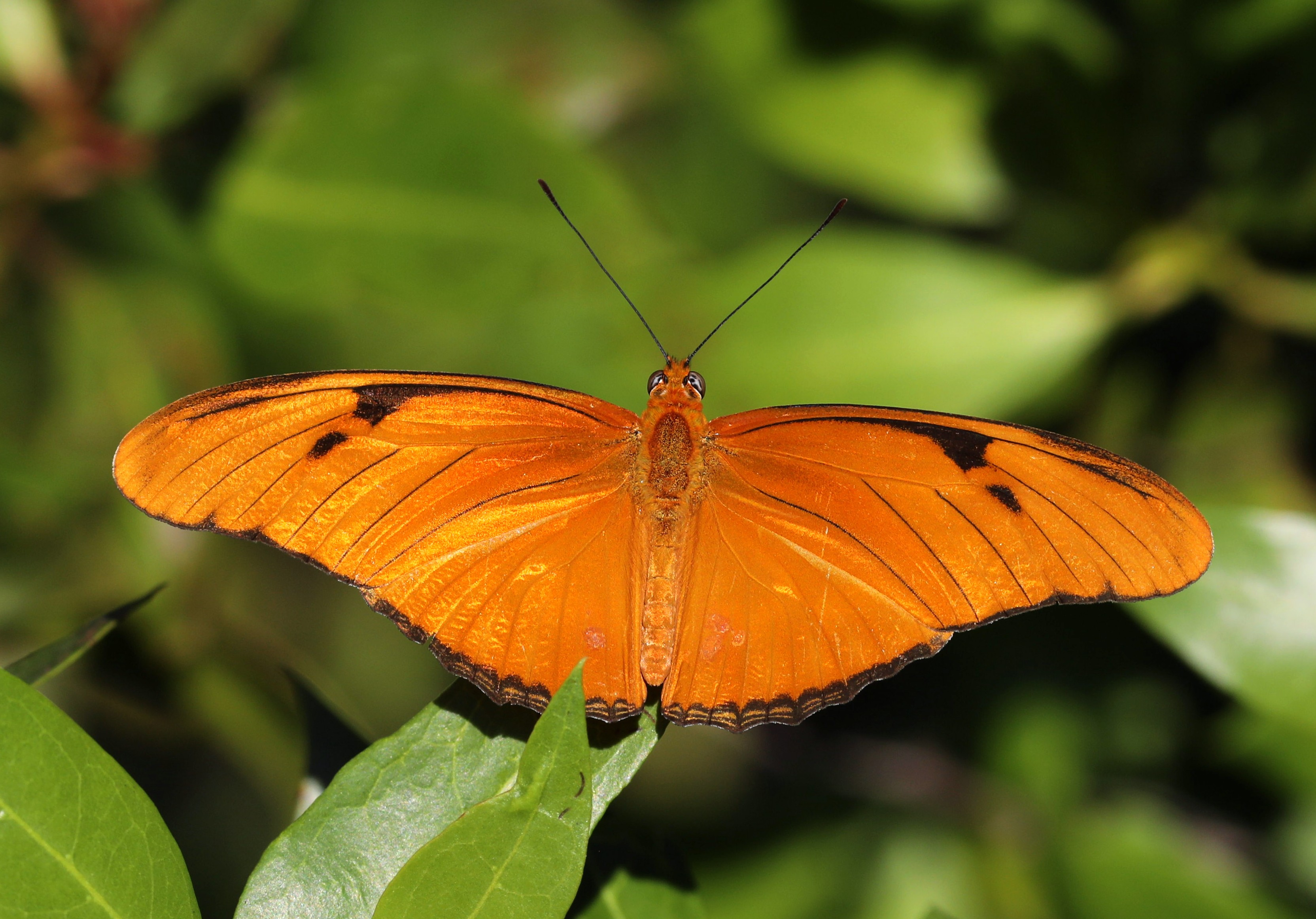
Dryas iulia

- Agraulis vanillae Maynard, 1869
- Dryas iulia (Bates, 1934)
- Eueides isabella Geyer, 1832
- Heliconius charithonia Comstock & Brown, 1950

===== Libytheinae =====
- Libytheana carinenta (Kirtland, 1851)
- Libytheana motya (Hübner, 1826)
- Libytheana terena Godart, 1819

===== Limenitinae =====
- Adelpha iphicleola Fruhstorfer, 1915
- Limenitis archippus (Strecker, 1878)

===== Nymphalinae =====
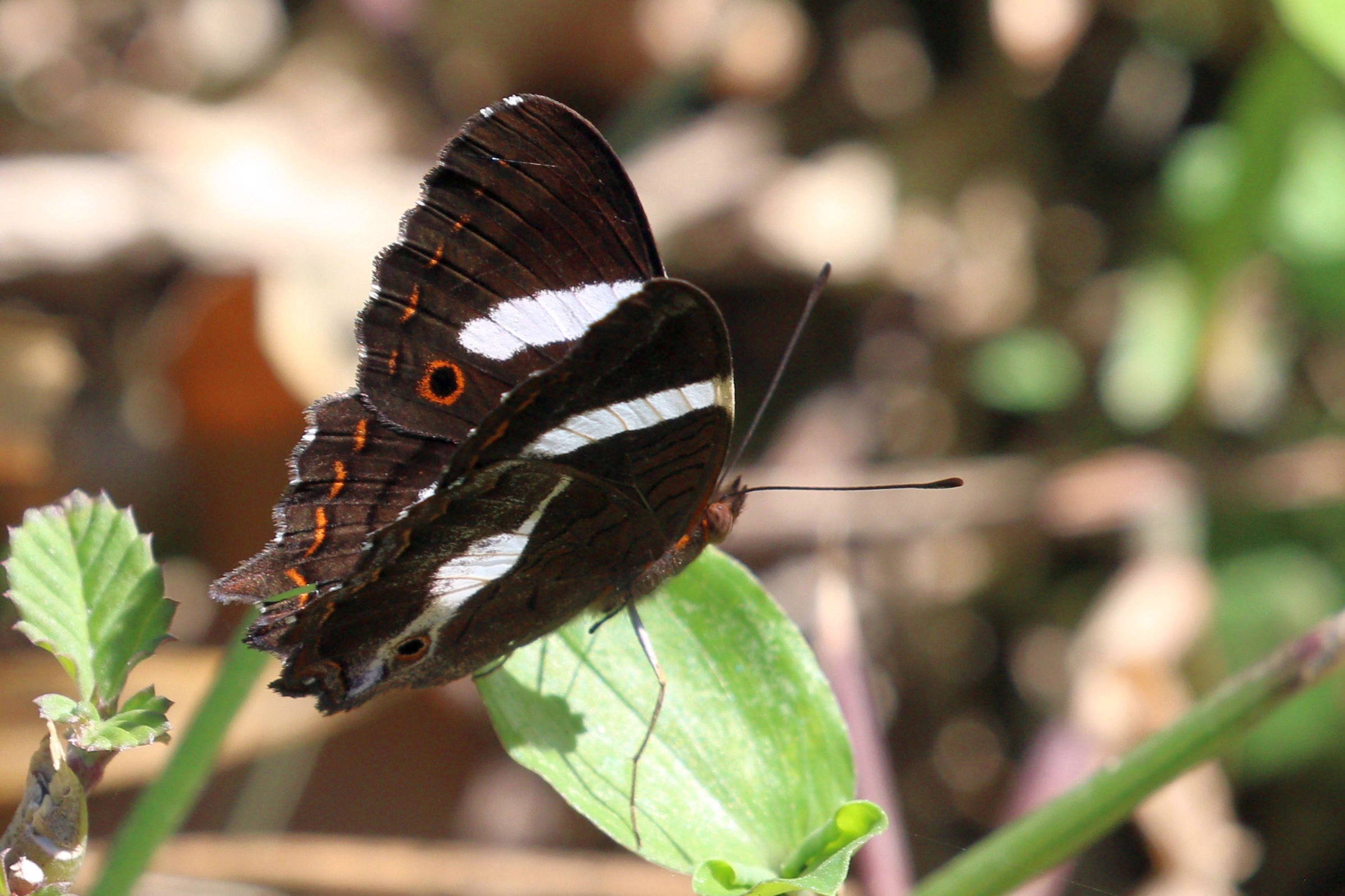
Anartia chrysopelia

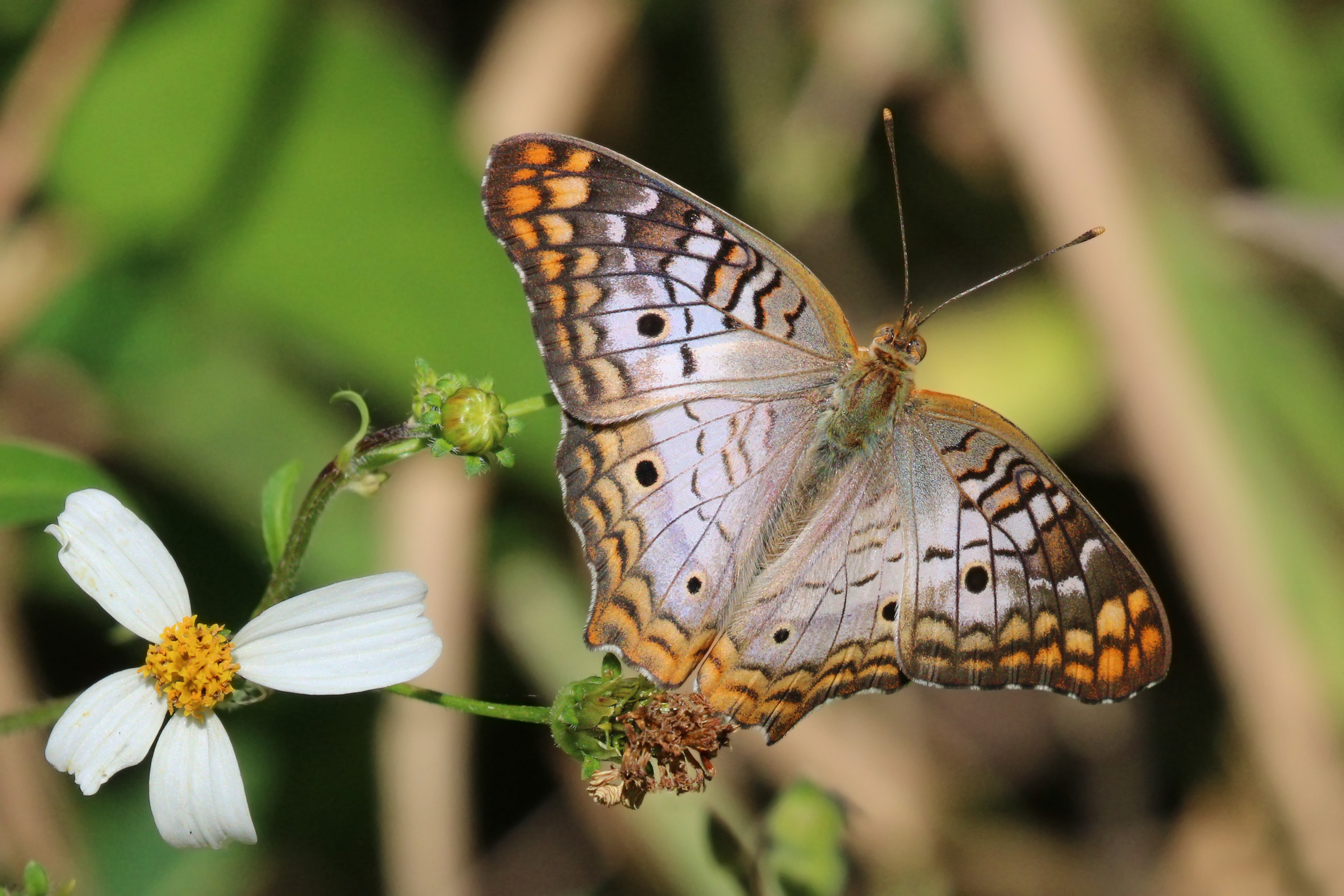
Anartia jatrophae guantanamo

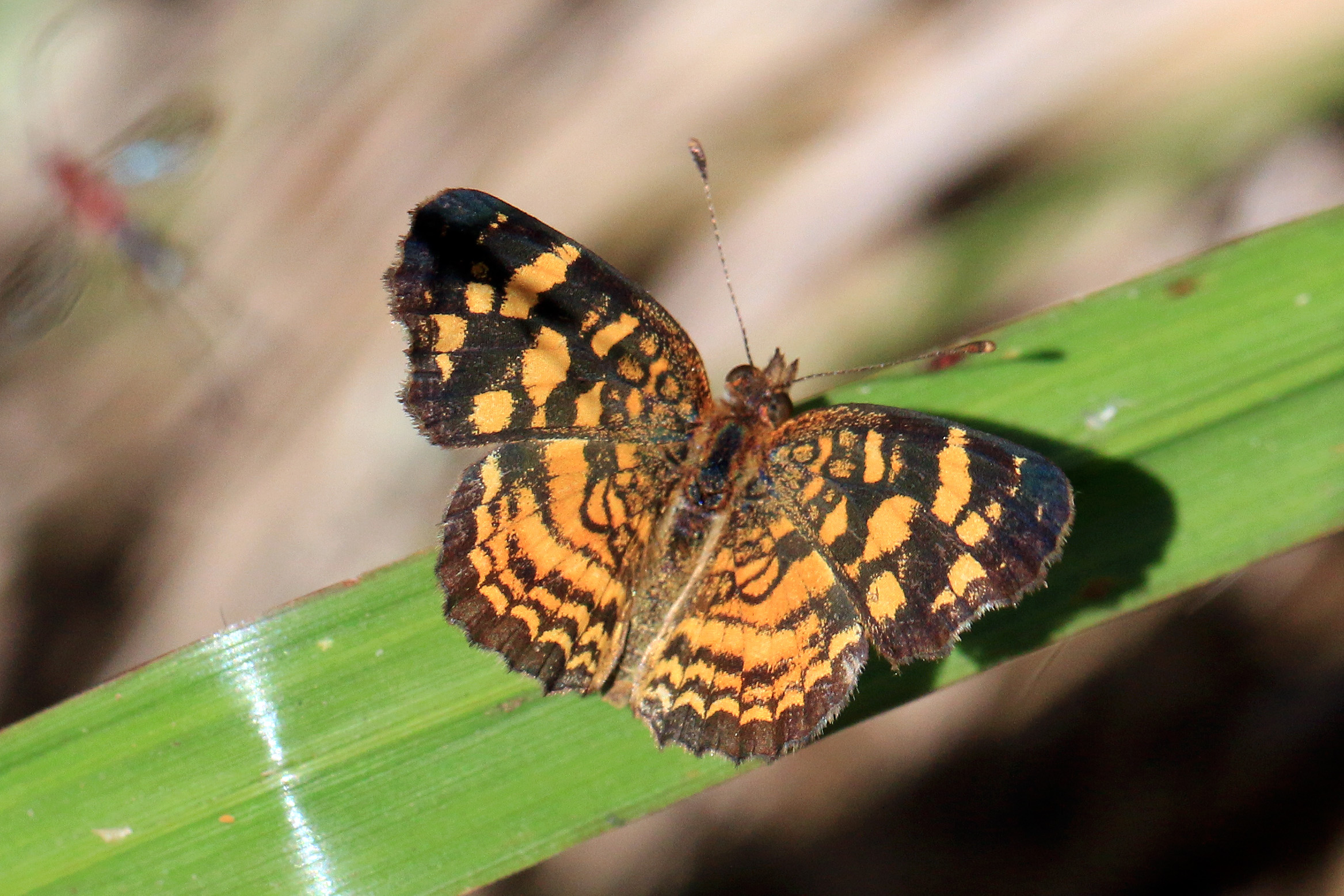
Anthanassa frisia frisia

- Anartia chrysopelea Hübner, 1825
- Anartia jatrophae Munroe, 1942
- Anthanassa frisia (Poey, 1832)
- Antillea pelops (Herrich-Schäffer, 1864)
- Atlantea perezi (Herrich-Schäffer, 1862)
- Colobura dirce (Comstock, 1942)
- Euptoieta claudia (Cramer, 1779)
- Euptoieta hegesia (Cramer, 1779)
- Historis acheronta (Bates, 1939)
- Historis odius (Fabricius, 1775)
- Hypanartia paullus (Fabricius, 1793)
- Hypolimnas misippus (Linnaeus, 1764)
- Junonia coenia Hübner, 1822
- Junonia evarete Felder & Felder, 1867
- Junonia genoveva (Stoll, 1782)
- Phyciodes phaon (Edwards, 1864)
- Polygonia interrogationis (Fabricius, 1798)
- Siproeta stelenes (Fruhstorfer, 1907)
- Vanessa atalanta (Fruhstorfer, 1909)
- Vanessa cardui (Linnaeus, 1758)
- Vanessa virginiensis (Drury, 1773)

===== Satyrinae =====
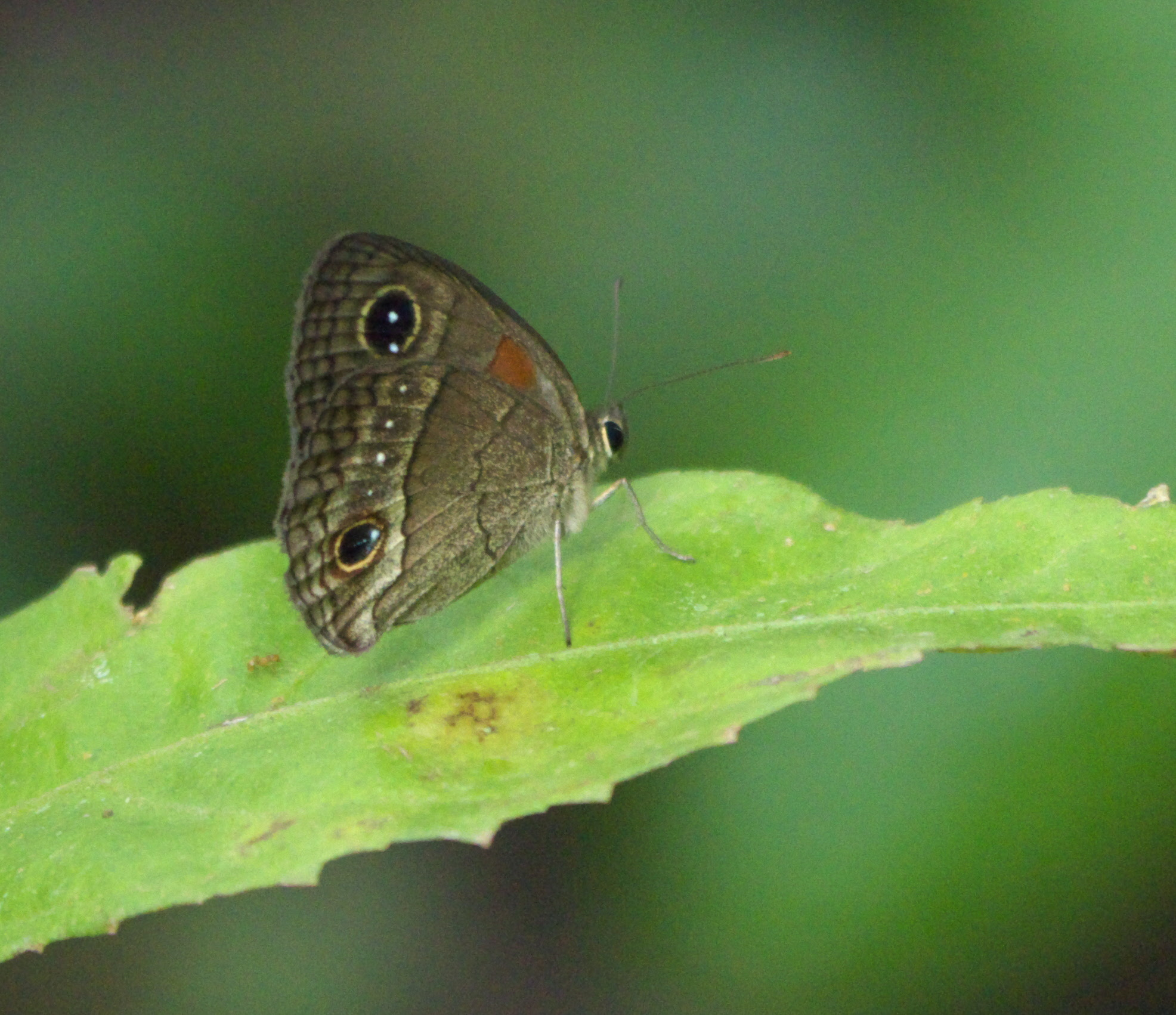
Calisto herophile

- Calisto bradleyi Munroe, 1950
- Calisto brochei Torre, 1973
- Calisto bruneri Michener, 1949
- Calisto herophile Hübner, 1823
- Calisto hysius (Godart, 1819)
- Calisto israeli Torre, 1973
- Calisto muripetens Bates, 1939
- Calisto occulta Núñez, 2012
- Calisto smintheus Bates, 1935

== Moths ==
=== Nepticuloidea ===
==== Nepticulidae ====
===== Nepticulinae =====
- Enteucha gilvafascia (Davis, 1978)
- Manoneura basidactyla (Davis, 1978)

==== Opostegidae ====
- Pseudopostega adusta (Walsingham, 1897)
- Pseudopostega crassifurcata Davis & Stonis, 2007
- Pseudopostega mignonae Davis & Stonis, 2007
- Pseudopostega saltatrix (Walsingham, 1897)
- Pseudopostega turquinoensis Davis & Stonis, 2007

=== Adeloidea ===
==== Heliozelidae ====
- Heliozela ahenea Walsingham, 1897

=== Tineoidea ===
==== Psychidae ====
===== Psychinae =====
- Cryptothelea surinamensis (Möschler, 1878)
- Paucivena cubana Núñez, 2006
- Paucivena ferruginea Núñez, 2006
- Paucivena fusca Núñez, 2006
- Paucivena hoffmanni (Koehler, 1939)
- Paucivena orientalis Núñez, 2006
- Paucivena pinarensis Núñez, 2006
- Prochalia licheniphilus (Koehler, 1939)

===== Oiketicinae =====
- Biopsyche thoracica (Grote, 1865)
- Oiketicus kirbyi Guilding, 1827
- Thyridopteryx ephemeraeformis (Haworth, 1803)

==== Tineidae ====
===== Acrolophinae =====
- Acrolophus arcanella (Clemens, 1859)
- Acrolophus basistriatus Davis, 1987
- Acrolophus dimidiella (Walsingham, 1892)
- Acrolophus fuscisignatus Davis, 1987
- Acrolophus guttatus Davis, 1987
- Acrolophus leucodocis (Zeller, 1877)
- Acrolophus niveipunctatus Walsingham, 1892
- Acrolophus noctuina (Walsingham, 1892)
- Acrolophus plumifrontella (Clemens, 1859)
- Acrolophus popeanellus (Clemens, 1859)
- Acrolophus vitellus Poey, 1833

===== Harmacloninae =====
- Harmaclona cossidella Busck, 1914

===== Meessiinae =====
- Antipolistes anthracella Forbes, 1933
- Eudarctia tischeriella (Forbes, 1931)
- Homostinea curviliniella Dietz, 1905
- Oenoe pumiliella (Walsingham, 1897)

===== Setomorphinae =====
- Setomorpha rutella Zeller, 1852

===== Tineinae =====
- Cubotinea orghidani Capuse & Georgescu, 1977
- Niditinea praeumbrata (Meyrick, 1919)
- Phereoeca uterella (Walsingham, 1897)
- Praeacedes atomosella (Walker, 1863)
- Tinea cretella Walsingham, 1897
- Tinea pallidorsella Zeller, 1877

===== Erechthiinae =====
- Erechthias minuscula (Walsingham, 1897)
- Erechthias zebrina (Butler, 1881)
- Ereunetis aeneoalbida (Walsingham, 1897)
- Ereunetis particolor (Walsingham, 1897)

===== Hieroxestinae =====
- Opogona antistacta Meyrick, 1937

=== Gracillaroidea ===
==== Gracillariidae ====
===== Gracillariinae =====
- Acrocercops albomarginatum (Walsingham, 1897)
- Acrocercops cissiella Busck, 1934
- Acrocercops clitoriella Busck, 1934
- Acrocercops cordiella Busck, 1934
- Acrocercops inconspicua Forbes, 1930
- Acrocercops ipomoeae Busck, 1934
- Acrocercops maranthaceae Busck, 1934
- Acrocercops melantherella Busck, 1934
- Acrocercops undifraga Meyrick, 1931
- Caloptilia aeneocapitella (Walsingham, 1891)
- Caloptilia burserella (Busck, 1900)
- Caloptilia perseae (Busck, 1920)
- Chilocampyla psidiella Busck, 1934
- Dialectica rendalli Walsingham, 1897
- Dialectica sanctaecrucis Walsingham, 1897
- Eucosmophora cupreella Walsingham, 1897
- Eucosmophora sideroxylonella Busck, 1900
- Marmara gulosa Guillén & Davis, 2001
- Metriochroa psychotriella Busck, 1900
- Neurobathra curcassi Busck, 1934
- Neurostrota gunniella (Busck, 1906)
- Neurostrota pithecolobiella Busck, 1934
- Spanioptila spinosum Walsingham, 1897

===== Lithocolletinae =====
- Phyllonorycter stigmaphyllae Busck, 1934
- Phyllonorycter tenuicaudella (Walsingham, 1897)
- Porphyrosela desmodiella (Clemens, 1859)

===== Phyllocnistinae =====
- Phyllocnistis citrella Stainton, 1856

=== Yponomeutoidea ===
==== Yponomeutidae ====
===== Yponomeutinae =====
- Yponomeuta triangularis Möschler, 1890

==== Argyresthiidae ====
- Argyresthia diffractella Zeller, 1877

==== Plutellidae ====
===== Plutellinae =====
- Plutella xylostella (Linnaeus, 1758)

==== Glyphipterigidae ====
===== Glyphipteriginae =====
- Glyphipterix paradisea Walsingham, 1897
- Ussara eurythmiella Busck, 1914

===== Acrolepiinae =====
- Acrolepiopsis cestrella (Busck, 1934)

==== Attevidae ====
- Atteva aurea (Fitch, 1856)
- Atteva gemmata (Grote, 1873)

==== Heliodinidae ====
- Aetole schulzella (Fabricius, 1794)

==== Bedeliidae ====
- Bedellia minor Busck, 1900

==== Lyonetiidae ====
===== Cemiostominae =====
- Leucoptera coffeella (Guérin– Méneville, 1842)

=== Gelechioidea ===
==== Blastobasidae ====
===== Blastobasinae =====
- Auximobasis insularis Walsingham, 1897

==== Schistoneidae ====
- Schistonoea fulvidella (Walshingham, 1897)

==== Elachistidae ====
===== Agonoxeninae =====
- Prochola fuscula Forbes, 1931

===== Depressariinae =====
- Gonionota bruneri Busck, 1934
- Gonionota rosacea (Forbes, 1931)
- Psittacastis stigmaphylli (Walsingham, 1912)

===== Elachistinae =====
- Dicranoctetes saccharella (Busck, 1934)

===== Ethmiinae =====
- Ethmia abraxasella Busck, 1914
- Ethmia confusella (Walker, 1863)
- Ethmia confusellastra Powell, 1973
- Ethmia cubensis Busck, 1934
- Ethmia decui Capuse, 1981
- Ethmia hiramella Busck, 1914
- Ethmia julia Powell, 1973
- Ethmia nivosella (Walker, 1864)
- Ethmia notatella (Walker, 1864)
- Ethmia oterosella Busck, 1934
- Ethmia parabittenella Capuse, 1981
- Ethmia piperella Powell, 1973
- Ethmia phylacis Busck, 1934
- Ethmia phylacops Powell, 1973
- Ethmia scythropa Walsingham, 1912
- Ethmia sibonensis Capuse, 1981
- Ethmia submissa Busck, 1914
- Ethmia subsimilis Walsingham, 1897
- Ethmia termenalbata Capuse, 1981
- Ethmia unilongistriella Capuse, 1981

===== Stenomatinae =====
- Mothonica cubana Duckworth, 1969
- Mothonica ocellea Forbes, 1930
- Stenoma comma Busck, 1911

==== Batrachedridae ====
===== Batrachedrinae =====
- Homaledra sabalella (Chambers, 1880)

==== Cosmopterigidae ====
===== Cosmopteriginae =====
- Cosmopterix adrastea Koster, 2010
- Cosmopterix amalthea Koster, 2010
- Cosmopterix attenuatella (Walker, 1864)
- Cosmopterix dapifera Hodges, 1962
- Cosmopterix floridanella Beutenmüller, 1889
- Cosmopterix similis Walsingham, 1897
- Cosmopterix teligera Meyrick, 1915
- Pebobs elara Koster, 2010
- Pebobs sanctivincenti (Walsingham, 1892)
- Pyroderces rileyi (Walsingham, 1882)

===== Chrysopeleiinae =====
- Ascalenia pancrypta (Meyrick, 1915)
- Ithome curvipunctella (Walsingham, 1892)
- Ithome pernigrella (Forbes, 1931)
- Perimede purpurescens Forbes, 1931
- Stilbosis lonchocarpella Busck, 1934
- Walshia miscecolorella (Chambers, 1875)

==== Gelechiidae ====
===== Anacampsinae =====
- Anacampsis desectella (Zeller, 1877)
- Anacampsis lagunculariella Busck, 1900
- Anacampsis meibomiella Forbes, 1931
- Battaristis concisa Meyrick, 1929
- Brachyacma palpigera (Walsingham, 1892)
- Strobisia iridipennella Clemens, 1860

===== Dichomeridinae =====
- Dichomeris acuminata (Staudinger, 1876)
- Dichomeris piperata (Walsingham, 1892)
- Helcystogramma hibisci (Stainton, 1859)
- Helcystogramma melissia (Walsingham, 1911)

===== Gelechiinae =====
- Aristotelia eupatoriella Busck, 1934
- Chionodes phalacra (Walsingham, 1911)
- Evippe evippella (Forbes, 1931)
- Keiferia lycopersicella (Walsingham, 1897)
- Nealyda pisoniae Busck, 1900
- Nealyda neopisoniae Clarke, 1946
- Phthorimaea operculella (Zeller, 1873)
- Polyhymno luteostrigella Chambers, 1874
- Stegasta bosqueella (Chambers, 1875)
- Stegasta capitella (Fabricius, 1794)
- Stegasta postpallescens (Walsingham, 1897)
- Symmetrischema striatella (Murtfeldt, 1900)
- Telphusa perspicua (Walsingham, 1897)
- Thiotricha godmani (Walsingham, 1892)
- Thiotricha sciurella (Walsingham, 1897)
- Tildenia gudmannella (Walsingham, 1897)

===== Pexicopinae =====
- Pectinophora gossypiella (Saunders, 1844)
- Prostomeus brunneus Busck, 1903
- Sitotroga cerealella (Olivier, 1789)

=== Pterophoroidea ===
==== Pterophoridae ====
===== Ochyroticinae =====
- Ochyrotica fasciata Walsingham, 1891

===== Pterophorinae =====
- Adaina bipunctatus (Möschler, 1890)
- Adaina ipomoeae Bigot & Etienne, 2009
- Adaina perplexus (Grossbeck, 1917)
- Adaina praeusta (Möschler, 1890)
- Adaina thomae (Zeller, 1877)
- Dejongia californicus (Walsingham, 1880)
- Exelastis montischristi (Walsingham, 1897)
- Exelastis pumilio (Zeller, 1873)
- Lantanophaga pusillidactylus (Walker, 1864)
- Lioptilodes albistriolatus (Zeller, 1877)
- Megalorhipida leucodactylus (Fabricius, 1794)
- Michaelophorus dentiger (Meyrick, 1916)
- Postplatyptilia antillae Gielis, 2006
- Sphenarches anisodactylus (Walker, 1864)

=== Schreckensteinioidea ===
==== Schreckensteiniidae ====
- Schreckensteinia festaliella (Hübner, [1819])

=== Urodoidea ===
==== Urodidae ====
===== Urodinae =====
- Urodus calligera (Zeller, 1877)
- Urodus ovata (Zeller, 1877)

=== Choreutoidea ===
==== Choreutidae ====
===== Choreutinae =====
- Brenthia confluxana (Walker, 1863)
- Brenthia cubana Heppner, 1985
- Brenthia gregori Heppner, 1985
- Brenthia hibiscusae Heppner, 1985
- Brenthia sapindella Busck, 1934
- Hemerophila diva (Riley, 1889)
- Hemerophila rimulalis (Zeller, 1875)
- Tebenna leptilonella (Busck, 1934)
- Tortyra ignita (Zeller, 1877)
- Tortyra iocyaneus Heppner, 1991
- Tortyra vividis Busck, 1934

=== Tortricoidea ===
==== Tortricidae ====
===== Chlidanotinae =====
- Ardeutica melidora Razowski, 1984
- Ardeutica mezion Razowski, 1984
- Auratonota paidosocia Razowski & Becker, 1999
- Auratonota cubana Razowski & Becker, 1999
- Thaumatographa cubensis Heppner, 1983

===== Olethreutinae =====
- Ancylis bauhiniae Busck, 1934
- Ancylis cordiae Busck, 1934
- Bactra philocherda Diakonoff, 1964
- Bactra verutana Zeller, 1875
- Cacocharis albimacula (Walsingham, 1892)
- Crocidosema plebejana Zeller, 1847
- Cryptaspasma bipenicilla Brown & Brown, 2004
- Cydia largo Heppner, 1981
- Cydia latiferreana (Walsingham, 1879)
- Cydia rana (Forbes, 1924)
- Endothenia anthracana (Forbes, 1931)
- Epiblema strenuana (Walker, 1863)
- Episimus argutana (Clemens, 1860)
- Episimus augmentana (Zeller, 1877)
- Episimus guiana (Busck, 1913)
- Episimus kimballi Heppner, 1994
- Episimus nesoites (Walsingham, 1897)
- Episimus rufatus Razowski & Brown, 2008
- Episimus semicirculanus Walker, 1863
- Episimus transferrana (Walker, 1863)
- Episimus tyrius Heinrich, 1923
- Ethelgoda texanana (Walsingham, 1879)
- Eucosma gomonana Kearfott, 1907
- Gymnandrosoma aurantianum Lima, 1927
- Gymnandrosoma leucothorax Adamski & Brown, 2001
- Rhyacionia frustrana (Comstock, 1880)
- Rhyacionia subtropica Miller, 1960
- Ricula incisiva Razowski & Becker, 2011
- Ricula maculana (Fernald, 1901)
- Strepsicrates smithiana Walsingham, 1892

===== Tortricinae =====
- Aethes pinara Razowski & Becker, 2007
- Aethes seriatana (Zeller, 1875)
- Aethesoides distigmatana (Walsingham, 1897)
- Amorbia concavana (Zeller, 1877)
- Amorbia effoetana Möschler, 1890
- Amorbia revolutana (Zeller, 1877)
- Apotoforma rotundipennis (Walsingham, 1897)
- Argyrotaenia cubae Razowski & Becker, 2010
- Argyrotaenia granpiedrae Razowski & Becker, 2010
- Argyrotaenia vinalesiae Razowski & Becker, 2010
- Clepsis peritana (Clemens, 1860)
- Cochylis parallelana Walsingham, 1887
- Cochylis sierraemaestrae Razowski & Becker, 2007
- Eugnosta fraudulenta Razowski & Becker, 2007
- Lasiothyris subsorbia Razowski & Becker, 2007
- Lorita lepidulana Forbes, 1931
- Lorita scarificata (Meyrick, 1917)
- Mictopsichia cubae Razowski, 2009
- Mimeugnosta particeps Razowski, 1986
- Platphalonidia holguina Razowski & Becker, 2007
- Platphalonidia remissa Razowski & Becker, 2007
- Platynota calidana (Zeller, 1877)
- Platynota rostrana (Walker, 1863)
- Saphenista cubana Razowski & Becker, 2007
- Saphenista mayarina Razowski & Becker, 2007
- Saphenista rosariana Razowski & Becker, 2007
- Saphenista simillima Razowski & Becker, 2007
- Saphenista turguinoa Razowski & Becker, 2007
- Sparganothis sulfureana (Clemens, 1860)
- Talponia geton Razowski & Becker, 2011
- Talponia necopina Razowski & Becker, 2011
- Talponia phantolinea Razowski & Becker, 2011
- Teras jamaicana Walker, 1863

=== Cossoidea ===
==== Cossidae ====
===== Cossinae =====
- Prionoxystus piger (Grote, 1865)

===== Zeuzerinae =====
- Psychonoctua personalis Grote, 1865

==== Sesiidae ====
===== Sesiinae =====
- Sannina uroceriformis Walker, 1856
- Synanthedon cubana (Herrich-Schäffer, 1866)

=== Zygaenoidea ===
==== Lacturidae ====
- Lactura subfervens (Walker, 1854)

==== Limacodidae ====
- Alarodia immaculata (Grote, 1865)
- Alarodia minuscula Dyar, 1927
- Alarodia pygmaea (Grote, 1867)
- Leucophobetron argentiflua (Geyer, 1827)

==== Megalopygidae ====
===== Megalopyginae =====
- Megalopyge krugii (Dewitz, 1877)
- Perola bistrigata Hampson, 1898

===== Unplaced =====
- Hysterocladia latiunca Hopp, 1927

==== Zygaenidae ====
===== Procridinae =====
- Setiodes nana (Herrich-Schäffer, 1866)

=== Thyridoidea ===
==== Thyrididae ====
===== Siculodinae =====
- Hexeris enhydris Grote, 1875
- Rhodoneura sparsireta Hampson, 1906
- Rhodoneura thiastoralis (Walker, 1859)
- Zeuzerodes maculata Warren, 1907

===== Striglininae =====
- Banisia myrsusalis (Walker, 1859)

=== Hyblaeoidea ===
==== Hyblaeidae ====
- Hyblaea puera (Cramer, 1777)

==== Hedylidae ====
- Macrosoma rubedinaria Walker, 1862

=== Pyraloidea ===
==== Pyralidae ====
===== Chrysauginae =====
- Bonchis munitalis (Lederer, 1863)
- Caphys biliniata (Stoll, 1781)
- Carcha hersilialis Walker, 1859
- Epitamyra albomaculalis (Möschler, 1890)
- Lepidomys irrenosa Guenée, 1852
- Murgisca subductellus (Möschler, 1890)
- Pachypalpia dispilalis Hampson, 1895
- Penthesilea difficilis (Felder & Rogenhofer, 1875)
- Salobrena recurvata (Möschler, 1886)
- Salobrena vacuana (Walker, 1863)
- Streptopalpia minusculalis (Möschler, 1890)
- Tosale oviplagalis (Walker, [1866])

===== Galleriinae =====
- Achroia grisella (Fabricius, 1794)
- Corcyra cephalonica (Stainton, 1866)
- Galleria mellonella (Linnaeus, 1758)
- Omphalocera cariosa Lederer, 1863

===== Epipaschiinae =====
- Carthara abrupta (Zeller, 1881)
- Dasyvesica cyrilla (Schaus, 1922)
- Deuterollyta majuscula (Herrich-Schäffer, 1871)
- Deuterollyta maroa (Schaus, 1922)
- Deuterollyta ragonoti (Möschler, 1890)
- Homura nocturnalis (Lederer, 1863)
- Macalla phaeobasalis Hampson, 1916
- Macalla thyrsisalis Walker, [1859]
- Phidotricha erigens Ragonot, 1888
- Phidotricha vedastella (Schaus, 1922)
- Pococera iogalis Schaus, 1922
- Pococera jovita Schaus, 1922
- Tallula atramentalis (Lederer, 1863)

===== Phycitinae =====
- Amegarthria cervicalis (Dyar, 1919)
- Amyelois transitella (Walker, 1863)
- Anabasis ochrodesma (Zeller, 1881)
- Anadelosemia texanella (Hulst, 1892)
- Ancylostomia stercorea (Zeller, 1848)
- Anegcephalesis arctella (Ragonot, 1887)
- Anypsipyla univitella Dyar, 1914
- Atheloca subrufella (Hulst, 1887)
- Baphala homoeosomella (Zeller, 1881)
- Bema neuricella (Zeller, 1848)
- Bema yddiopsis (Dyar, 1919)
- Cactoblastis cactorum (Berg, 1885)
- Cadra cautella (Walker, 1863)
- Chorrera extrincica (Dyar, 1919)
- Crocidomera turbidella Zeller, 1848
- Davara caricae (Dyar, 1913)
- Dioryctria clarioralis (Walker, 1863)
- Dioryctria horneana (Dyar, 1919)
- Ectomyelois ceratoniae (Zeller, 1839)
- Ectomyelois decolor (Zeller, 1881)
- Ectomyelois muriscis (Dyar, 1914)
- Elasmopalpus lignosellus (Zeller, 1848)
- Ephestia elutella (Hübner, 1796)
- Ephestia kuehniella Zeller, 1879
- Erelieva quantulella (Hulst, 1887)
- Etiella zinckenella (Treitschke, 1832)
- Eurythmasis ignifatua Dyar, 1914
- Fundella argentina Dyar, 1919
- Fundella ignobilis Heinrich, 1956
- Fundella pellucens Zeller, 1848
- Homoeosoma electella (Hulst, 1887)
- Hypsipyla grandella (Zeller, 1848)
- Laetilia coccidivora Dyar, 1918
- Laetilia obscura Dyar, 1918
- Mescinia bacerella Dyar, 1919
- Moodna ostrinella (Clemens, 1860)
- Oncolabis anticella Zeller, 1848
- Oryctometopia fossulatella Ragonot, 1888
- Ozamia lucidalis (Walker, 1863)
- Phycitodes olivacella (Ragonot, 1888)
- Piesmopoda xanthopolys Dyar, 1914
- Plodia interpunctella (Hübner, [1810–13])
- Ribua innoxia Heinrich, 1940
- Ribua patriciella (Dyar, 1918)
- Sarasota furculella (Dyar, 1919)
- Scorylus cubensis Heinrich, 1956
- Strephomescinia schausella Dyar, 1919
- Stylopalpia lunigerella Hampson, 1901
- Ufa rubedinella (Zeller, 1848)
- Ulophora guarinella (Zeller, 1881)
- Unadilla maturella (Zeller, 1881)
- Zamagiria fraterna Heinrich, 1956
- Zamagiria hospitabilis Dyar, 1919
- Zamagiria laidion (Zeller, 1881)
- Zonula fulgidula (Heinrich, 1956)

===== Pyralinae =====
- Ocrasa tripartitalis Herrich– Schäffer, 1871
- Hypsopygia nostralis (Guenée, 1854)
- Pyralis manihotalis Guenée, 1854

==== Crambidae ====
===== Crambinae =====
- Argyria diplomochalis Dyar, 1913
- Argyria lacteella (Fabricius, 1794)
- Argyria venatella (Schaus, 1922)
- Catharylla contiguella Zeller, 1872
- Crambus moeschleralis Schaus, 1940
- Diatraea lineolata (Walker, 1856)
- Diatraea saccharalis (Fabricius, 1794)
- Epina dichromella Walker, 1866
- Erupa argentescens Hampson, 1896
- Fissicrambus haytiellus (Zincken, 1821)
- Fissicrambus minuellus (Walker, 1863)
- Fissicrambus profanellus (Walker, 1866)
- Microcausta flavipunctalis Barnes & McDunnough, 1913
- Microcrambus atristrigellus (Hampson, 1919)
- Microcrambus biguttellus (Forbes, 1920)
- Microcrambus discludellus (Möschler, 1890)
- Microcrambus subretusellus Błeszyński, 1967
- Parapediasia detomatella (Möschler, 1890)
- Parapediasia ligonella (Zeller, 1881)
- Prionapteryx achatina (Zeller, 1863)
- Prionapteryx elongata (Zeller, 1877)
- Prionapteryx eugraphis Walker, 1863
- Thaumatopsis floridella Barnes & McDunnough, 1913
- Urola nivalis (Drury, 1773)

===== Schoenobiinae =====
- Carectocultus perstrialis (Hübner, [1825])
- Donacaula montivagella (Zeller, 1863)
- Leptosteges xantholeucalis (Guenée, 1854)
- Rupela leucatea (Zeller, 1863)
- Rupela tinctella (Walker, 1863)
- Schoenobius molybdoplectus (Dyar, 1914)

===== Glaphyriinae =====
- Aethiophysa savoralis (Schaus, 1920)
- Chalcoela iphitalis (Walker, 1859)
- Chalcoela pegasalis (Walker, [1866])
- Contortipalpia santiagalis (Schaus, 1920)
- Dicymolomia julianalis (Walker, 1859)
- Dicymolomia metalophota (Hampson, 1897)
- Glaphyria badierana (Fabricius, 1794)
- Glaphyria cedroalis (Schaus, 1924)
- Glaphyria decisa (Walker, [1866])
- Glaphyria cappsi Munroe, 1972
- Glaphyria matanzalis (Schaus, 1920)
- Glaphyria tanamoalis (Schaus, 1920)
- Hellula phidilealis (Walker, 1859)
- Hellula simplicalis Herrich-Schäffer, 1871
- Lipocosma chiralis Schaus, 1920

===== Dichogaminae =====
- Dichogama amabilis Möschler, 1890
- Dichogama decoralis (Walker, 1865)
- Dichogama redtenbacheri Lederer, 1863

===== Musotiminae =====
- Neurophyseta avertinalis (Schaus, 1924)
- Neurophyseta normalis Hampson, 1912
- Odilla noralis Schaus, 1940
- Undulambia albitessellalis (Hampson, 1906)
- Undulambia leucostictalis (Hampson, 1895)
- Undulambia polystichalis Capps, 1965

===== Acentropinae =====
- Chrysendeton anicitalis (Schaus, 1924)
- Chrysendeton claudialis Walker, 1859
- Chrysendeton medicinalis Grote, 1881
- Chrysendeton minimalis (Herrich-Schäffer, 1871)
- Munroessa maralis (Schaus, 1920)
- Neargyractis plusialis (Herrich-Schäffer, 1871)
- Neargyractis slossonalis (Dyar, 1906)
- Parapoynx allionealis Walker, 1859
- Parapoynx diminutalis Snellen, 1880
- Parapoynx fluctuosalis (Zeller, 1852)
- Parapoynx rugosalis Möschler, 1890
- Parapoynx seminealis (Walker, 1859)
- Petrophila albulalis (Hampson, 1906)
- Petrophila opulentalis (Lederer, 1863)
- Synclita obliteralis (Walker, 1859)
- Usingeriessa psalmoidalis (Schaus, 1924)

===== Odontiinae =====
- Cliniodes nacrealis Munroe, 1964
- Cliniodes nomadalis Dyar, 1912
- Cliniodes opalalis Guenée, 1854
- Microtheoris ophionalis (Walker, 1859)
- Mimoschinia rufofascialis (Stephens, 1834)

===== Evergestinae =====
- Evergestella evincalis (Möschler, 1890)
- Symphisa amoenalis (Walker, 1862)
- Trischistognatha pyrenealis (Walker, 1859)

===== Pyraustinae =====
- Achyra bifidalis (Fabricius, 1794)
- Achyra rantalis (Guenée, 1854)
- Achyra similalis (Guenée, 1854)
- Agathodes designalis Guenée, 1854
- Anania nerissalis (Walker, 1859)
- Apogeshna stenialis (Guenée, 1854)
- Aponia insularis Munroe, 1964
- Arthromastix lauralis (Walker, 1859)
- Asciodes gordialis Guenée, 1854
- Asturodes fimbriauralis (Guenée, 1854)
- Ategumia ebulealis (Guenée, 1854)
- Ategumia matutinalis (Guenée, 1854)
- Atomopteryx pterophoralis (Walker, 1866)
- Atomopteryx serpentifera (Hampson, 1913)
- Azochis rufidiscalis Hampson, 1904
- Bicilia iarchasalis (Walker, 1859)
- Bicilia olivia Butler, 1875
- Blepharomastix achroalis (Hampson, 1913)
- Blepharomastix schistisemalis (Hampson, 1912)
- Bocchoropsis pharaxalis (Druce, 1895)
- Bocchoropsis plenilinealis (Dyar, 1917)
- Ceratocilia liberalis (Guenée, 1854)
- Ceratoclasis delimitalis (Guenée, 1854)
- Chilochromopsis sceletogramma (Dyar, 1925)
- Coenostolopsis apicalis (Lederer, 1863)
- Conchylodes diphteralis (Geyer, 1832)
- Conchylodes hedonialis (Walker, 1859)
- Condylorrhiza oculatalis (Möschler, 1890)
- Condylorrhiza vestigialis (Guenée, 1854)
- Crocidocnemis pellucidalis (Möschler, 1890)
- Cryptobotys zoilusalis (Walker, 1859)
- Cyclocena lelex (Cramer, 1777)
- Desmia ceresalis (Walker, 1859)
- Desmia deploralis Hampson, 1912
- Desmia funebralis Guenée, 1854
- Desmia naclialis Snellen, 1875
- Desmia ploralis (Guenée, 1854)
- Desmia quadrinotalis (Herrich– Schäffer, 1871)
- Desmia recurvalis Schaus, 1940
- Desmia repandalis Schaus, 1920
- Desmia tages (Cramer, 1777)
- Desmia ufeus (Cramer, 1777)
- Deuterophysa baracoalis Schaus, 1924
- Deuterophysa fernaldi Munroe, 1983
- Deuterophysa subrosea (Warren, 1892)
- Diacme mopsalis (Walker, 1859)
- Diacme phyllisalis (Walker, 1859)
- Diaphania albifascialis (Hampson, 1912)
- Diaphania antillia Munroe, 1960
- Diaphania costata (Fabricius, 1794)
- Diaphania elegans (Möschler, 1890)
- Diaphania hyalinata (Linnaeus, 1767)
- Diaphania immaculalis (Guenée, 1854)
- Diaphania infimalis (Guenée, 1854)
- Diaphania lualis (Herrich-Schäffer, 1871)
- Diaphania lucidalis (Hübner, 1823)
- Diaphania nitidalis (Cramer, 1781)
- Diaphania oeditornalis (Hampson, 1912)
- Diaphantania ceresalis (Walker, 1859)
- Diaphantania impulsalis (Herrich-Schäffer, 1871)
- Diasemiopsis leodocusalis (Walker, 1859)
- Diastictis holguinalis Munroe, 1956
- Diathrausta cubanalis Dyar, 1913
- Epicorsia oedipodalis (Guenée, 1854)
- Epipagis fenestralis (Hübner, 1796)
- Ercta vittata (Fabricius, 1794)
- Erilusa leucoplagalis (Hampson, 1898)
- Eulepte concordalis Hübner, [1825]
- Eulepte gastralis (Guenée, 1854)
- Eulepte inguinalis (Guenée, 1854)
- Geshna cannalis (Quaintance, 1898)
- Glyphodes rubrocinctalis (Guenée, 1854)
- Glyphodes sibillalis Walker, 1859
- Hahncappsia ramsdenalis (Schaus, 1920)
- Herpetogramma antillalis (Schaus, 1920)
- Herpetogramma bipunctalis (Fabricius, 1794)
- Herpetogramma cora (Dyar, 1914)
- Herpetogramma infuscalis (Guenée, 1854)
- Herpetogramma innotalis (Hampson, 1899)
- Herpetogramma phaeopteralis (Guenée, 1854)
- Herpetogramma semilaniata (Hampson, 1895)
- Hileithia differentialis (Dyar, 1914)
- Hileithia ductalis Möschler, 1890
- Hileithia magualis (Guenée, 1854)
- Hoterodes ausonia (Cramer, 1777)
- Hyalorista limasalis (Walker, [1866])
- Hyalorista taeniolalis (Guenée, 1854)
- Hydriris ornatalis (Duponchel, 1832)
- Hymenia perspectalis (Hübner, 1796)
- Lamprosema santialis Schaus, 1920
- Leucochroma corope (Cramer, 1781)
- Leucochroma jamaicensis Hampson, 1912
- Lineodes contortalis Guenée, 1854
- Lineodes gracilalis Herrich-Schäffer, 1871
- Lineodes integra (Zeller, 1873)
- Lineodes multisignalis Herrich-Schäffer, 1868
- Lineodes triangulalis Möschler, 1890
- Loxomorpha cambogialis (Guenée, 1854)
- Lygropia fusalis Hampson, 1904
- Lygropia imparalis (Walker, [1866])
- Lygropia tripunctata (Fabricius, 1794)
- Lypotigris reginalis (Cramer, 1781)
- Marasmia cochrusalis (Walker, 1859)
- Marasmia trapezalis (Guenée, 1854)
- Maruca vitrata (Fabricius, 1787)
- Microphysetica hermeasalis (Walker, 1859)
- Microthyris anormalis (Guenée, 1854)
- Microthyris prolongalis (Guenée, 1854)
- Mimophobetron pyropsalis (Hampson, 1904)
- Mimorista botydalis (Guenée, 1854)
- Mimorista tristigmalis (Hampson, 1899)
- Neohelvibotys neohelvialis (Capps, 1967)
- Neoleucinodes elegantalis (Guenée, 1854)
- Neoleucinodes torvis Capps, 1948
- Oenobotys glirialis (Herrich-Schäffer, 1871)
- Oenobotys vinotinctalis (Hampson, 1895)
- Omiodes cuniculalis Guenée, 1854
- Omiodes indicata (Fabricius, 1775)
- Omiodes insolutalis Möschler, 1890
- Omiodes martyralis (Lederer, 1863)
- Omiodes simialis Guenée, 1854
- Omiodes stigmosalis (Warren, 1892)
- Ommatospila narcaeusalis (Walker, 1859)
- Ostrinia penitalis (Hampson, 1913)
- Palpita flegia (Cramer, 1777)
- Palpita isoscelalis Munroe, 1959
- Palpita kimballi Munroe, 1959
- Palpita persimilis Munroe, 1959
- Palpita quadristigmalis (Guenée, 1854)
- Palpusia eurypalpalis (Hampson, 1912)
- Pantographa suffusalis Druce, 1895
- Penestola bufalis (Guenée, 1854)
- Penestola simplicialis (Barnes & McDunnough, 1913)
- Phaedropsis illepidalis (Herrich-Schäffer, 1871)
- Phaedropsis impeditalis (Herrich-Schäffer, 1871)
- Phaedropsis placendalis (Möschler, 1890)
- Phaedropsis principaloides (Möschler, 1890)
- Phaedropsis stictigramma (Hampson, 1912)
- Phlyctaenia fovifera (Hampson, 1913)
- Pilocrocis ramentalis Lederer, 1863
- Pleuroptya silicalis (Guenée, 1854)
- Polygrammodes elevata (Fabricius, 1794)
- Polygrammodes ostrealis (Guenée, 1854)
- Polygrammodes ponderalis (Guenée, 1854)
- Portentomorpha xanthialis (Guenée, 1854)
- Praeacrospila melanoproctis (Hampson, 1899)
- Prenesta quadrifenestralis (Herrich-Schäffer, 1871)
- Psara dryalis (Walker, 1859)
- Psara hesperialis (Herrich-Schäffer, 1871)
- Psara pargialis (Schaus, 1920)
- Psara subaurantialis (Herrich-Schäffer, 1871)
- Pseudopyrausta cubanalis (Schaus, 1920)
- Pyrausta cardinalis (Guenée, 1854)
- Pyrausta episcopalis (Herrich-Schäffer, 1871)
- Pyrausta germanalis (Herrich-Schäffer, 1871)
- Pyrausta gracilalis (Herrich-Schäffer, 1871)
- Pyrausta insignitalis (Guenée, 1854)
- Pyrausta panopealis (Walker, 1859)
- Pyrausta phyllidalis (Schaus, 1940)
- Pyrausta signatalis (Walker, [1866])
- Pyrausta tyralis (Guenée, 1854)
- Rhectocraspeda periusalis (Walker, 1859)
- Salbia cassidalis Guenée, 1854
- Salbia haemorrhoidalis Guenée, 1854
- Samea carettalis Schaus, 1940
- Samea conjunctalis Schaus, 1940
- Samea ecclesialis Guenée, 1854
- Samea multiplicalis (Guenée, 1854)
- Sathria internitalis (Guenée, 1854)
- Sisyracera inabsconsalis (Möschler, 1890)
- Sisyracera subulalis (Guenée, 1854)
- Sparagmia gonoptera Munroe, 1958
- Spilomela minoralis Hampson, 1912
- Spilomela personalis (Herrich-Schäffer, 1871)
- Spilomela pervialis (Herrich-Schäffer, 1871)
- Spoladea recurvalis (Fabricius, 1775)
- Steniodes mendica (Hedemann, 1894)
- Sufetula diminutalis (Walker, [1866])
- Sufetula grumalis Schaus, 1920
- Syllepis marialis Poey, 1832
- Syllepte amando (Cramer, 1777)
- Syllepte belialis (Walker, 1859)
- Syllepte patagialis Zeller, 1852
- Syllepte viridivertex Schaus, 1920
- Synclera jarbusalis (Walker, 1859)
- Syngamia florella (Cramer, 1781)
- Tanaophysa adornatalis Warren, 1898
- Terastia meticulosalis Guenée, 1854
- Trichaea pilicornis Herrich-Schäffer, 1866
- Triuncidia eupalusalis (Walker, 1859)
- Udea rubigalis (Guenée, 1854)
- Zenamorpha discophoralis (Hampson, 1899)

=== Mimallonoidea ===
==== Mimallonidae ====
- Cicinnus packardii (Grote, 1865)

=== Drepanoidea ===
==== Doidae ====
- Doa cubana Schaus, 1906

=== Lasiocampoidea ===
==== Lasiocampidae ====
===== Macromphaliinae =====
- Artace cribrarius (Ljungh, 1825)

=== Bombycoidea ===
==== Bombycidae ====
===== Bombycinae =====
- Bombyx mori (Linnaeus, 1758)

==== Saturniidae ====
===== Saturniinae =====
- Samia ricini (Jones, 1791)
- Copaxa denda Druce, 1894

==== Sphingidae ====
===== Macroglossinae =====
- Aellopos blaini Herrich-Schäffer, [1869]
- Aellopos clavipes (Rothschild & Jordan, 1903)
- Aellopos fadus (Cramer, 1775)
- Aellopos tantalus (Drury, 1773)
- Aellopos titan (Clark, 1936)
- Callionima calliomenae (Schaufuss, 1870)
- Callionima gracilis (Jordan, 1923)
- Callionima parce (Fabricius, 1775)
- Callionima ramsdeni (Clark, 1920)
- Cautethia grotei Edwards, 1882
- Enyo boisduvali (Oberthür, 1904)
- Enyo lugubris (Linnaeus, 1771)
- Enyo ocypete (Linnaeus, 1758)
- Erinnyis alope (Drury, 1773)
- Erinnyis crameri (Schaus, 1898)
- Erinnyis ello (Linnaeus, 1758)
- Erinnyis guttularis (Walker, 1856)
- Erinnyis lassauxii (Boisduval, 1859)
- Erinnyis obscura (Fabricius, 1775)
- Erinnyis oenotrus (Cramer, 1780)
- Erinnyis pallida Grote, 1865
- Eumorpha fasciatus (Sulzer, 1776)
- Eumorpha labruscae (Linnaeus, 1758)
- Eumorpha satellitia (Grote, 1865)
- Eumorpha mirificatus (Grote, 1875)
- Eumorpha vitis (Linnaeus, 1758)
- Eupyrrhoglossum sagra (Poey, 1832)
- Hyles lineata (Fabricius, 1775)
- Isognathus rimosa (Grote, 1865)
- Madoryx pseudothyreus (Grote, 1865)
- Pachylia ficus (Linnaeus, 1758)
- Pachylia syces Hübner, [1819]
- Pachylioides resumens (Walker, 1856)
- Perigonia divisa Grote & Robinson, 1865
- Perigonia lefebvrii (Lucas, 1857)
- Perigonia lusca (Fabricius, 1777)
- Phryxus caicus (Cramer, 1777)
- Pseudosphinx tetrio (Linnaeus, 1771)
- Xylophanes chiron Rothschild & Jordan, 1906
- Xylophanes clarki Ramsden, 1921
- Xylophanes gundlachi (Herrich-Schäffer, 1863)
- Xylophanes irrorata (Grote, 1865)
- Xylophanes pluto (Fabricius, 1777)
- Xylophanes porcus (Hübner, [1823])
- Xylophanes robinsoni (Grote, 1865)
- Xylophanes tersa (Linnaeus, 1771)

===== Sphinginae =====
- Adhemarius daphne (Rothschild & Jordan, 1903)
- Agrius cingulata (Fabricius, 1775)
- Cocytius antaeus (Drury, 1773)
- Cocytius duponchel (Poey, 1832)
- Cocytius haxairei Cadiou, 2006
- Cocytius vitrinus Rothschild & Jordan, 1910
- Manduca afflicta (Grote, 1865)
- Manduca brontes (Grote, 1865)
- Manduca rustica (Wood, 1915)
- Manduca sexta (Butler, 1875)
- Nannoparce poeyi (Grote, 1865)
- Neococytius cluentius (Cramer, 1775)
- Protambulyx strigilis (Linnaeus, 1771)

=== Geometroidea ===
==== Sematuridae ====
- Mania aegisthus (Fabricius, 1793)

==== Uraniidae ====
===== Epipleminae =====
- Antiplecta triangularis Warren, 1906
- Coeluromima reticularia (Möschler, 1890)
- Epiplema incolorata (Guenée, 1857)
- Gymnoplocia mamillata (Felder & Rogenhofer, 1875)
- Nedusia fimbriata Herrich-Schäffer, 1870
- Philagraula slossoniae Hulst, 1896
- Powondrella cingillaria Geyer, 1837
- Schidax anosectaria Guenée, [1858]
- Schidax squamaria Hübner, 1818
- Syngria ramosaria (Möschler, 1890)
- Trotorhombia metachromata (Walker, 1861)

===== Uraniinae =====
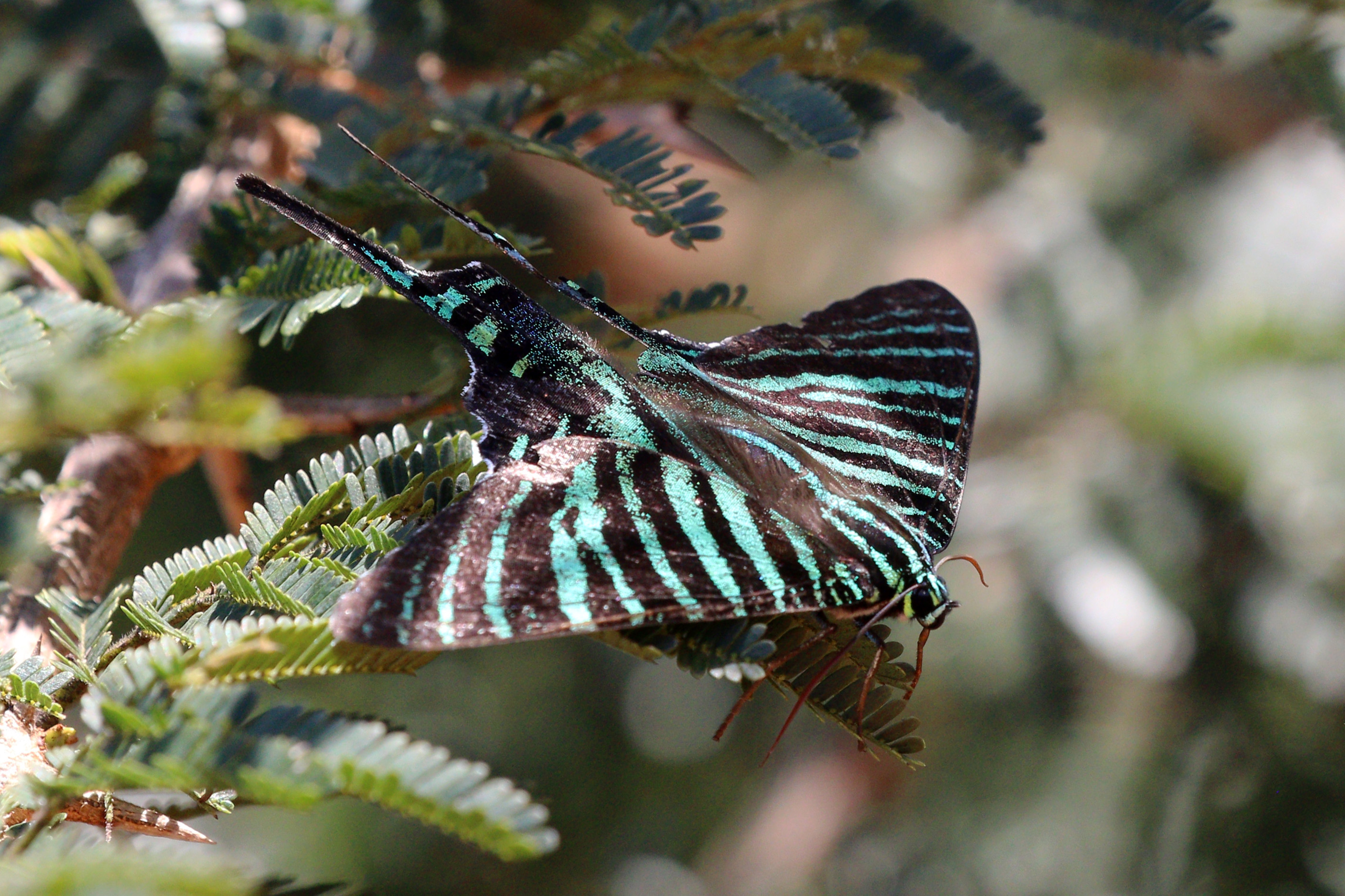
Urania boisduvalii

- Urania boisduvalii (Guérin, 1829)
- Urania poeyi (Herrich-Schäffer, 1868)

==== Geometridae ====
===== Oenochrominae =====
- Almodes terraria Guenée, [1858]
- Ametris nitocris (Cramer, 1780)
- Ergavia subrufa Warren, 1897

===== Ennominae =====
- Bagodares rectisignaria (Herrich-Schäffer, 1870)
- Covellia procrastinata Ferguson, 2009
- Cyclomia mopsaria (Guenée, [1858])
- Cyclomia plagaria (Guenée, [1858])
- Cymatophora insularis (Warren, 1906)
- Epimecis detexta (Walker, 1860)
- Epimecis scolopaiae (Drury, 1773)
- Erastria decrepitaria (Hübner, [1823])
- Erosina hyberniata Guenée, [1858]
- Hydatoscia ategua (Druce, 1892)
- Iridopsis divisata Warren, 1905
- Iridopsis eupepla Warren, 1906
- Iridopsis idonearia (Walker, 1860)
- Iridopsis rufisparsa Warren, 1906
- Leucula simplicaria (Guenée, [1858])
- Lomographa angelica (Schaus, 1923)
- Macaria acutaria (Walker, 1863)
- Macaria centrosignatha Herrich-Schäffer, 1870
- Macaria distribuaria Hübner, [1825])
- Macaria regulata (Fabricius, 1775)
- Melanochroia chephise (Stoll, 1782)
- Melanochroia geometroides (Walker, 1854)
- Melanochroia regnatrix Grote & Robinson, 1867
- Nepheloleuca complicata (Guenée, [1858])
- Nepheloleuca politia (Guenée, [1858])
- Nereidania opalina (Warren, 1908)
- Numia albisecta Warren, 1906
- Numia terebintharia Guenée, [1858]
- Oenoptila paluma (Schaus, 1938)
- Oxydia cubana (Warren, 1906)
- Oxydia vesulia (Walker, 1860)
- Parilexia antilleata Ferguson, 2009
- Parilexia nicetaria (Guenée, 1857)
- Parilexia proditata (Walker, 1861)
- Patalene ephyrata (Guenée, [1858])
- Patalene epionata (Guenée, [1858])
- Patalene hamulata (Guenée, [1858])
- Patalene olyzonaria (Walker, 1860)
- Pero amanda (Druce, 1898)
- Pero cubana Herbulot, 1994
- Pero nerisaria (Walker, 1860)
- Pero zalissaria (Walker, 1860)
- Phrygionis auriferaria (Hulst, 1887)
- Phrygionis paradoxata (Guenée, 1857)
- Phyllodonta decisaria (Herrich-Schäffer, 1870)
- Pityeja nazada (Druce, 1892)
- Prochoerodes exiliata (Herrich-Schäffer, 1870)
- Prochoerodes gundlachi Becker, 2002
- Psamatodes pernicata (Guenée, [1858])
- Psamatodes trientata (Herrich-Schäffer, 1870)
- Sabulodes laticlavia Rindge, 1978
- Sabulodes subopalaria (Walker, 1860)
- Semiothisa cellulata (Herrich-Schäffer, 1870)
- Semiothisa acepsimaria Schaus, 1923
- Semiothisa debiliata (Warren, 1897)
- Semiothisa pacianaria Schaus, 1923
- Semiothisa santiagaria (Schaus, 1923)
- Sericoptera virginaria (Hulst, 1886)
- Sphacelodes fusilineata (Walker, 1860)
- Sphacelodes vulneraria (Hübner, 1823)
- Thyrinteina arnobia (Herrich-Schäffer, 1870)
- Thysanopyga apicitruncaria Herrich-Schäffer, [1856]
- Thysanopyga subpusaria (Herrich-Schäffer, 1870)
- Trigrammia quadrinotaria Herrich-Schäffer, [1855]

===== Geometrinae =====
- Chlorochlamys chloroleucaria (Guenée, [1858])
- Chloropteryx paularia (Möschler, 1886)
- Eucrostes dominicaria (Guenée, [1858])
- Eueana niveociliaria (Herrich-Schäffer, 1870)
- Nemoria lixaria (Guenée, [1858])
- Nemoria rectilinea (Warren, 1906)
- Oospila confundaria (Möschler, 1890)
- Oospila decoloraria (Walker, 1861)
- Phrudocentra centrifugaria (Herrich-Schäffer, 1870)
- Synchlora cupedinaria (Grote, 1880)
- Synchlora frondaria Guenée, [1858]
- Synchlora herbaria (Fabricius, 1794)
- Synchlora xysteraria (Hulst, 1886)

===== Sterrhinae =====
- Cyclophora nanaria (Walker, 1861)
- Cyclophora ordinata Walker, 1862
- Cyclophora urcearia Guenée, [1858]
- Idaea eupitheciata (Guenée, [1858])
- Idaea furciferata (Packard, 1873)
- Idaea insulensis (Rindge, 1958)
- Idaea tenebrica (Warren, 1906)
- Leptostales crossii (Hulst, 1900)
- Leptostales laevitaria Geyer, 1837
- Leptostales nigrofasciaria (Herrich-Schäffer, 1870)
- Leptostales oblinataria (Möschler, 1890)
- Leptostales pannaria (Guenée, [1858])
- Leptostales penthemaria Dyar, 1913
- Leptostales phorcaria (Guenée, [1858])
- Leptostales praepeditaria (Möschler, 1890)
- Leptostales terminata (Guenée, [1858])
- Lobocleta nataria (Walker, 1866)
- Lobocleta tenellata Möschler, 1886
- Lophosis labeculata (Hulst, 1887)
- Pleuroprucha asthenaria (Walker, 1861)
- Pleuroprucha molitaria (Möschler, 1890)
- Pleuroprucha rudimentaria (Guenée, [1858])
- Pseudasellodes fenestraria (Guenée, 1857)
- Ptychamalia perlata (Warren, 1900)
- Scopula apparitaria (Walker, 1861)
- Scopula canularia (Herrich-Schäffer, 1870)
- Scopula chionaeata (Herrich-Schäffer, 1870)
- Scopula compensata (Walker, 1861)
- Scopula fernaria Schaus, 1940
- Scopula juruana (Butler, 1881)
- Scopula umbilicata (Fabricius, 1794)
- Semaeopus caecaria (Hübner, [1823])
- Semaeopus callichroa Prout, 1938
- Semaeopus castaria (Guenée, [1858])
- Semaeopus concomitans (Warren, 1906)
- Semaeopus curta (Warren, 1906)
- Semaeopus perletaria (Warren, 1906)

===== Larentiinae =====
- Disclisioprocta stellata (Guenée, [1858])
- Dyspteris abortivaria (Herrich-Schäffer, [1855])
- Eois isographata (Walker, 1863)
- Eois tegularia (Guenée, [1858])
- Eubaphe pumilata (D. S. Fletcher, 1954)
- Euphyia moeraria (Guenée, [1858])
- Eupithecia succernata Möschler, 1886
- Hagnagora ephestris (Felder & Rogenhofer, 1875)
- Hammaptera parinotata (Zeller, 1872)
- Heterusia lymnadoides (Prout, 1931)
- Obila defensata (Walker, 1862)
- Obila pannosata (Guenée, [1858])
- Obila praecurraria (Möschler, 1890)
- Psaliodes subochreofusa Herbulot, 1988
- Spargania clementi Prout, 1931
- Triphosa affirmata (Guenée, [1858])
- Xanthorhoe herbicolor Prout, 1931

=== Noctuoidea ===
==== Notodontidae ====
===== Notodontinae =====
- Cerura rarata (Walker, 1865)

===== Dudusinae =====
- Antillisa lucedia Schaus, 1937
- Antillisa toddi Torre & Alayo, 1959
- Crinodes besckei Hübner, 1824
- Hapigia directa Schaus, 1904

===== Heterocampinae =====
- Boriza crossaea (Druce, 1894)
- Heterocampa albidiscata Schaus, 1904
- Heterocampa baracoana Schaus, 1904
- Heterocampa cubana Grote, 1865
- Heterocampa santiago Schaus, 1904
- Heterocampa zayasi (Torre & Alayo, 1959)
- Ianassa violascens (Herrich-Schäffer, 1855)
- Malocampa punctata (Cramer, 1782)
- Malocampa sida (Schaus, 1892)
- Misogada pallida Schaus, 1904
- Rifargia bichorda (Hampson, 1901)
- Rifargia distinguenda (Walker, 1856)
- Schizura pelialis Schaus, 1937

===== Nystaleinae =====
- Bardaxima lucilinea (Walker, 1858)
- Elasmia insularis (Grote, 1867)
- Elymiotis morana Schaus, 1928
- Hippia insularis (Grote, 1866)
- Lepasta bractea (Felder, 1874)
- Nystalea aequipars (Walker, 1858)
- Nystalea ebalea (Stoll, 1779)
- Nystalea indiana Grote, 1884
- Nystalea superciliosa Guenée, 1852

===== Dioptinae =====
- Eremonidiopsis aggregata Aguila, 2013

==== Erebidae ====
===== Lymantriinae =====
- Dasychira manto (Strecker, 1900)
- Eloria cubana Schaus, 1906
- Orgyia leucostigma (Smith, 1797)

===== Arctiinae =====
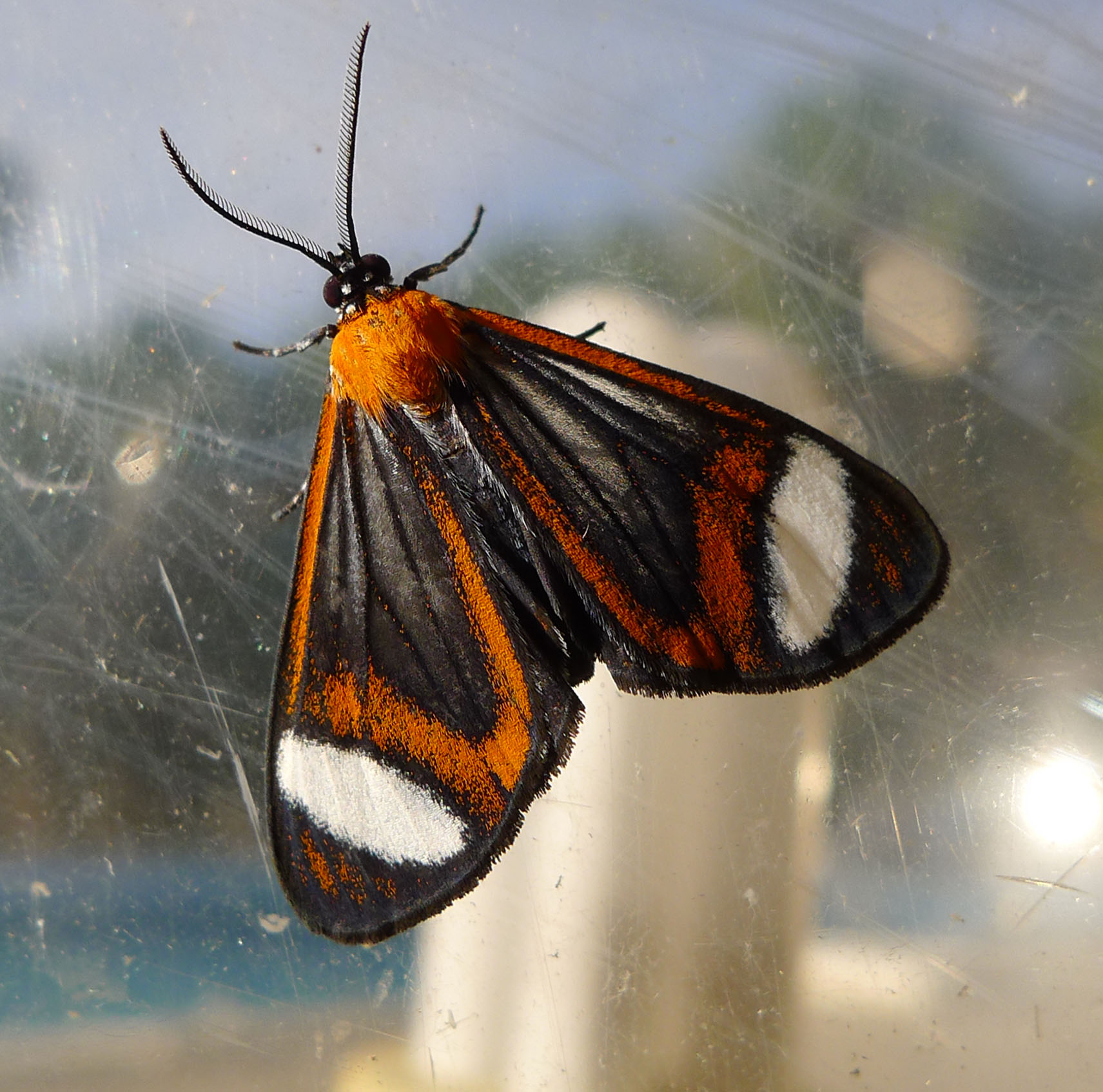
Hyalurga vinosa

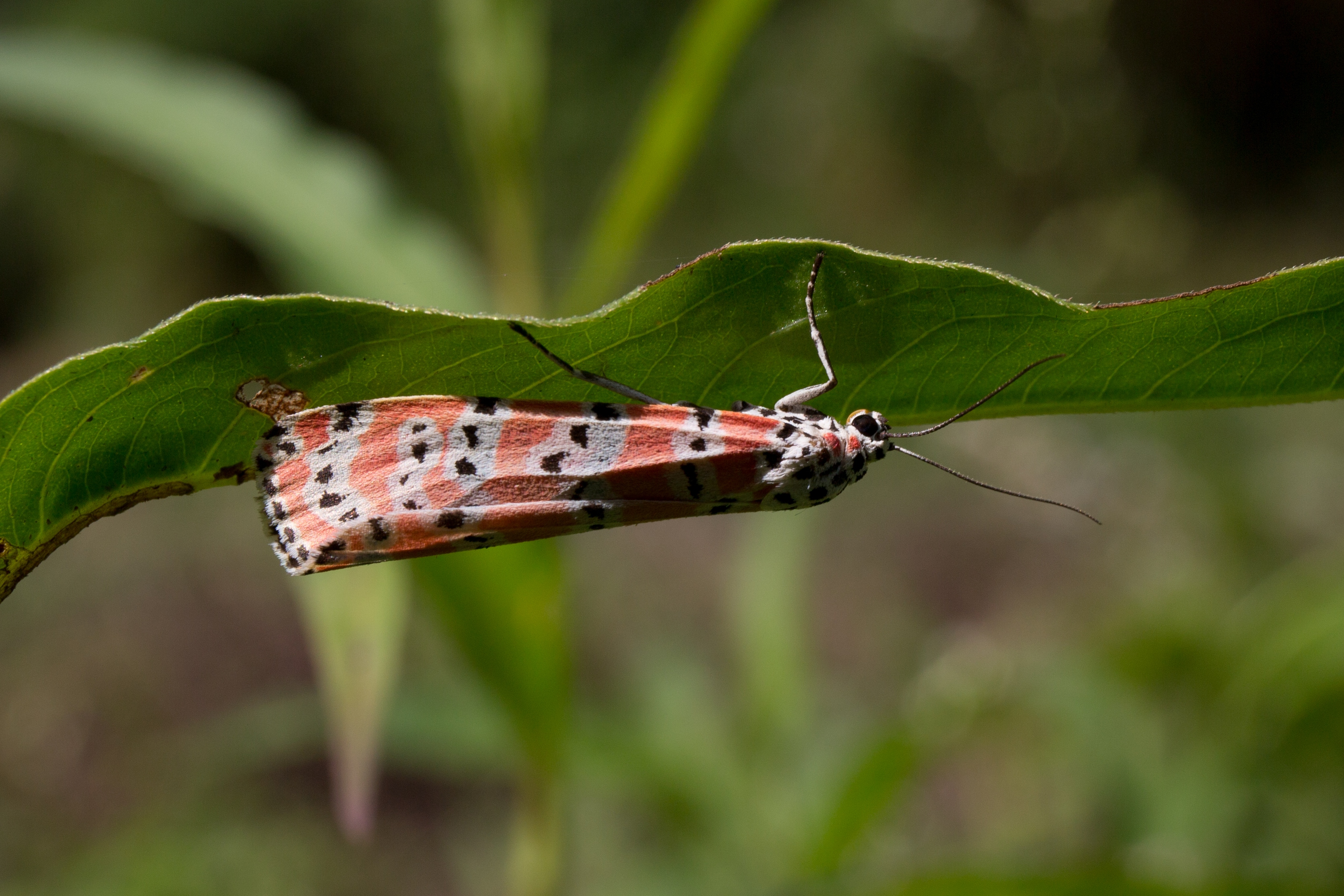
Utetheisa ornatrix

- Aclytia heber (Cramer, 1780)
- Aethria dorsolineata Hampson, 1898
- Agyrta dux (Walker, 1854)
- Ammalo helops (Cramer, 1775)
- Ammalo ramsdeni Schaus, 1925
- Antichloris clementi Schaus, 1938
- Apistosia humeralis Grote, 1867
- Boenasa tricolor (Herrich-Schäffer, 1866)
- Burtia cruenta (Herrich-Schäffer, 1866)
- Burtia rubella Grote, 1866
- Calidota cubensis (Grote, 1865)
- Calidota strigosa (Walker, 1855)
- Carales astur (Rothschild, 1909)
- Carathis gortynoides Grote, 1865
- Carathis alayorum Becker, 2011
- Composia credula (Fabiricius, 1775)
- Composia fidelissima Herrich-Schäffer, 1866
- Correbidia terminalis (Walker, 1866)
- Cosmosoma achemon (Fabricius, 1781)
- Cosmosoma auge (Linnaeus, 1767)
- Cosmosoma fenestrata (Drury, 1773)
- Cosmosoma juanita Neumogen, 1894
- Ctenucha bruneri Schaus, 1938
- Ctenucha hilliana Dyar, 1915
- Ctenuchidia gundlachia (Schaus, 1904)
- Ctenuchidia virgo (Herrich-Schäffer, [1855])
- Dahana cubana Schaus, 1904
- Darantasia rumolda Schaus, 1925
- Didaphne cyanomela (Neumogen, 1894)
- Elysius barnesi Schaus, 1904
- Empyreuma pugione (Linnaeus, 1767)
- Episcepsis leneus (Cramer, 1779)
- Episcepsis tethis (Linnaeus, 1771)
- Estigmene acrea (Drury, 1773)
- Eucereon guacolda (Poey, 1832)
- Eucereon irrorata Schaus, 1904
- Eudoliche osvalda Schaus, 1925
- Eunomia caymanensis Hampson, 1911
- Eunomia insularis Grote, 1866
- Eunomia nitidula (Herrich-Schäffer, 1866)
- Eupseudosoma involuta (Sepp, [1855])
- Haemanota sanguinidorsia (Schaus, 1905)
- Haemaphlebiella formona (Schaus, 1905)
- Halysidota cinctipes Grote, 1865
- Horama diffisa Grote, 1866
- Horama margarita McCabe, 1992
- Horama panthalon (Fabricius, 1793)
- Horama pennipes (Grote, 1866)
- Horama pretus (Cramer, 1777)
- Horama zapata Dietz & Duckworth, 1976
- Hyalurga vinosa (Drury, 1773)
- Hypercompe albicornis (Grote, 1865)
- Hypercompe decora (Walker, 1855)
- Isanthrene ustrina Hübner, 1827
- Lepidolutzia baucis (Dalman, 1823)
- Leucanopsis tanamo (Schaus, 1904)
- Lophocampa alternata (Grote, 1867)
- Lophocampa atomosa (Walker, 1855)
- Lophocampa grotei (Schaus, 1904)
- Lophocampa luxa (Grote, 1865)
- Lophocampa scripta (Grote, 1867)
- Lymire albipennis (Herrich-Schäffer, 1866)
- Lymire edwardsii Grote, 1881
- Lymire lacina Schaus, 1925
- Lymire subochrea (Herrich-Schäffer, 1866)
- Lymire vedada Schaus, 1938
- Mulona barnesi Field, 1952
- Mulona schausi Field, 1952
- Mydromera carmina Shaus, 1938
- Nelphe carolina (H, Edwards, 1887)
- Nyridela chalciope (Hübner, [1831])
- Paramulona albulata (Herrich-Schäffer, 1866)
- Paramulona baracoa Field, 1951
- Paramulona nephelistis (Hampson, 1905)
- Paramulona schwarzi Field, 1951
- Pareuchaetes insulata (Walker, 1855)
- Phaio longipennis Neumogen, 1894
- Phoenicoprocta capistrata (Fabricius, 1775)
- Pseudaclytia bambusana Schaus, 1938
- Pseudocharis minima (Grote, 1867)
- Robinsonia dewitzi Gundlach, 1881
- Robinsonia evanida Schaus, 1905
- Robinsonia formula Grote, 1865
- Seripha plumbeola Hampson, 1909
- Soritena habanera Schaus, 1924
- Sphaeromachia cubana (Herrich-Schäffer, 1866)
- Spilosoma jussiaeae (Poey, 1832)
- Sthenognatha cinda (Schaus, 1938)
- Syntomeida epilais (Walker, 1854)
- Syntomeida wrighti (Gundlach, 1881)
- Syntomidopsis gundlachiana (Neumogen, 1890)
- Syntomidopsis variegata (Walker, 1854)
- Tricypha proxima (Grote, 1867)
- Uranophora chalybaea Hübner, [1831]
- Utetheisa ornatrix (Linnaeus, 1758)
- Virbia disparilis (Grote, 1865)
- Virbia heros (Grote, 1865)
- Virbia latus (Grote, 1865)
- Virbia pallicornis (Grote, 1867)
- Zellatilla columbia Dyar, 1914

===== Herminiinae =====
- Aristaria bleptinalis Schaus, 1916
- Aristaria theroalis (Walker, [1859])
- Bleptina acastusalis Walker, [1859]
- Bleptina araealis (Hampson, 1901)
- Bleptina athusalis Schaus, 1916
- Bleptina atymnusalis (Walker, [1859])
- Bleptina baracoana Schaus, 1916
- Bleptina caradrinalis Guenée, 1854
- Bleptina carlona Schaus, 1916
- Bleptina diopis (Hampson, 1904)
- Bleptina hydrillalis Guenée, 1854
- Bleptina menalcasalis Walker, [1859]
- Bleptina muricolor Schaus, 1916
- Bleptina pudesta Schaus, 1916
- Carteris lineata (Druce, 1898)
- Carteris oculatalis (Möschler, 1890)
- Compsenia gracillima (Herrich-Schäffer, 1870)
- Compsenia insulalis Schaus, 1916
- Drepanoplapia lunifera (Butler, 1878)
- Heterogramma terminalis (Herrich-Schäffer, 1870)
- Hypenula deleona Schaus, 1916
- Hypenula miriam Schaus, 1916
- Lascoria alucitalis (Guenée, 1854)
- Lascoria nigrirena (Herrich-Schäffer, 1870)
- Lascoria orneodalis (Guenée, 1854)
- Lophoditta tuberculata (Herrich-Schäffer, 1870)
- Macristis geminipunctalis Schaus, 1916
- Mastigophorus latipennis Herrich-Schäffer, 1870
- Mastigophorus parra Poey, 1832
- Phalaenophana eudorcalis (Guenée, 1854)
- Phalaenophana santiagonis (Schaus, 1916)
- Phlyctaina irrigualis Möschler, 1890
- Physula acutalis Herrich-Schäffer, 1870
- Physula albipunctilla Schaus, 1916
- Physula albirenalis Herrich-Schäffer, 1870
- Physula apicalis Herrich-Schäffer, 1870
- Physula herminialis Herrich-Schäffer, 1870
- Physula limonalis (Schaus, 1913)
- Physula tristigalis Herrich-Schäffer, 1870
- Physula variegalis Herrich-Schäffer, 1870
- Rejectaria lysandria (Druce, 1891)
- Salia ferrigeralis Walker, [1866]
- Santiaxis copima Schaus, 1916
- Sorygaza ramsdeni Schaus, 1916
- Synomera isthmialis Schaus, 1916
- Tetanolita mutatalis (Möschler, 1890)
- Thursania aristarioides Schaus, 1916
- Thursania costigutta (Herrich-Schäffer, 1870)
- Thursania hobsonalis Schaus, 1916
- Thursania miaralis Schaus, 1916
- Thursania voodoalis Schaus, 1916

===== Hypeninae =====
- Arrade linecites Schaus, 1916
- Hypena abscisalis (Walker, 1858)
- Hypena androna (Druce, 1890)
- Hypena degesalis Walker, 1859
- Hypena exoletalis Guenée, 1854
- Hypena lividalis (Hübner, 1790)
- Hypena mactatalis Walker, [1859]
- Hypena minualis Guenée, 1854
- Hypena porrectalis (Fabricius, 1794)
- Hypena scabra (Fabricius, 1798)
- Hypena subidalis Guenée, 1854
- Hypena umbralis (Smith, 1884)
- Hypena vetustalis Guenée, 1854

===== Rivulinae =====
- Rivula pusilla Möschler, 1890

===== Scoliopteryginae =====
- Alabama argillacea (Hübner, 1823)
- Anomis catarhodois Dyar, 1913
- Anomis editrix (Guenée, 1852)
- Anomis erosa Hübner, 1821
- Anomis exacta Hübner, 1822
- Anomis flava (Stephens, 1829)
- Anomis gundlachi Schaus, 1940
- Anomis hedys (Dyar, 1913)
- Anomis illita Guenée, 1852
- Anomis impasta Guenée, 1852
- Anomis innocua Schaus, 1940
- Anomis orthopasta Dyar, 1913
- Anomis tingenscens Dyar, 1913

===== Calpinae =====
- Adiopa disgrega (Möschler, 1890)
- Dialithis gemmifera Hübner, [1821]
- Eudocima apta (Walker, [1858])
- Eudocima serpentifera (Walker, [1858])
- Eudocima toddi (Zayas, 1965)
- Gonodonta bidens Geyer, 1832
- Gonodonta clotilda (Stoll, 1790)
- Gonodonta incurva (Sepp, [1840])
- Gonodonta nitidimacula Guenée, 1852
- Gonodonta nutrix (Stoll, 1780)
- Gonodonta sicheas (Cramer, 1777)
- Gonodonta unica Neumoegen, 1891
- Gonodonta uxor (Cramer, 1780)
- Graphigona regina (Guenée, 1852)
- Ipnista marina (Druce, 1891)
- Oraesia excitans Walker, [1858]
- Parachabora abydas (Herrich-Schäffer, [1869])
- Parachabora triangulifera Hampson, 1901
- Plusiodonta clavifera (Walker, 1869)
- Plusiodonta stimulans (Walker, [1858])
- Plusiodonta thomae Guenée, 1852

===== Hypocalinae =====
- Hypocala andremona (Stoll, 1781)
- Hypsoropha adeona Druce, 1889

===== Scoleocampinae =====
- Palpidia pallidior Dyar, 1898

===== Hypenodinae =====
- Schrankia macula (Druce, 1891)

===== Boletobiinae =====
- Metalectra analis Schaus, 1916
- Metalectra geminicincta Schaus, 1916
- Metalectra tanamensis Schaus, 1916

===== Eublemminae =====
- Eublemma cinnamomea (Herrich-Schäffer, 1868)
- Eublemma minima (Guenée, 1852)
- Eublemma recta (Guenée, 1852)

===== Phytometrinae =====
- Aglaonice otignatha Hampson, 1924
- Bradunia guanabana Schaus, 1916
- Cecharismena abarusalis (Walker, 1859)
- Cecharismena cara Möschler, 1890
- Cecharismena nectarea Möschler, 1890
- Glympis arenalis (Walker, [1866])
- Glympis concors (Hübner, 1823)
- Glympis eubolialis (Walker, [1866])
- Glympis holothermes Hampson, 1926
- Hemeroplanis apicigutta Herrich-Schäffer, 1869
- Hemeroplanis scopulepes (Haworth, 1809)
- Hemeroplanis zayasi Todd, 1960
- Hormoschista latipalpis (Walker, 1858)
- Isogona scindens (Walker, 1858)
- Janseodes melanospila (Guenée, 1852)
- Mursa gracilis (Möschler, 1890)
- Mursa phtisialis (Guenée, 1854)
- Mursa sotiusalis (Walker, 1859)
- Ommatochila mundula (Zeller, 1872)
- Phytometra ernestinana (Blanchard, 1840)
- Radara nealcesalis (Walker, 1859)

===== Anobinae =====
- Anoba pohli Felder, 1894
- Baniana relapsa (Walker, 1858)
- Deinopa biligula (Guenée, 1852)

===== Erebinae =====
- Acanthodica grandis Schaus, 1894
- Achaea ablunaris (Guenée, 1852)
- Argidia subvelata (Walker, 1865)
- Ascalapha odorata (Linnaeus, 1758)
- Bulia confirmans Walker, [1858]
- Caenurgia chloropha (Hübner, 1818)
- Calyptis iter Guenée, 1852
- Celiptera cometophora Hampson, 1913
- Celiptera frustulum Guenée, 1852
- Celiptera levina (Stoll, 1782)
- Celiptera remigioides Guenée, 1852
- Coenipeta bibitrix (Hübner, 1823)
- Coenipeta medina Guenée, 1852
- Doryodes insularia Hampson, 1914
- Dyops chromatophila (Walker, 1858)
- Elousa albicans Walker, [1858]
- Epidromia lienaris (Hübner, 1823)
- Euclystis angularis (Möschler, 1886)
- Euclystis guerini (Guenée, 1852)
- Gonodontodes dispar Hampson, 1913
- Hemeroblemma numeria (Drury, [1773])
- Hemeroblemma opigena (Drury, 1773)
- Hemicephalis phoenicias (Hampson, 1926)
- Itomia xylina Herrich-Schäffer, 1869
- Kakopoda progenies (Guenée, 1852)
- Latebraria amphipyroides Guenée, 1852
- Lesmone detrahens (Walker, 1858)
- Lesmone formularis (Zeller, 1837)
- Lesmone gurda (Guenée, 1852)
- Lesmone hinna (Geyer, 1837)
- Letis hypnois (Hübner, [1821])
- Letis mycerina (Cramer, 1777)
- Letis xylia Guenée, 1852
- Melipotis acontioides (Guenée, 1852)
- Melipotis contorta (Guenée, 1852)
- Melipotis famelica (Guenée, 1852)
- Melipotis fasciolaris (Hübner, [1831])
- Melipotis januaris (Guenée, 1852)
- Melipotis ochrodes (Guenée, 1852)
- Melipotis prolata (Walker, [1858])
- Metria acharia (Stoll, 1781)
- Metria decessa (Walker, 1857)
- Metria irresoluta (Walker, 1858)
- Mimophisma forbesi Schaus, 1940
- Mocis cubana Hampson, 1913
- Mocis diffluens (Guenée, 1852)
- Mocis disseverans (Walker, 1858)
- Mocis latipes (Guenée, 1852)
- Mocis marcida (Guenée, 1852)
- Mocis repanda (Fabricius, 1794)
- Ophisma tropicalis Guenée, 1852
- Orodesma apicina Herrich-Schäffer, 1868
- Panula inconstans Guenée, 1852
- Pararcte immanis (Walker, 1858)
- Perasia garnoti (Guenée, 1852)
- Perasia helvina (Guenée, 1852)
- Perasia lineolaris (Hübner, 1809)
- Polionycta attina (Druce, 1898)
- Ptichodis bistriga (Herrich-Schäffer, 1869)
- Ptichodis immunis (Guenée, 1852)
- Selenisa suero (Cramer, 1777)
- Selenisa sueroides (Guenée, 1852)
- Thysania zenobia (Cramer, 1777)
- Toxonprucha diffundens (Walker, 1858)
- Tyrissa recurva Walker, 1866
- Zale albidula (Walker, 1865)
- Zale fictilis (Guenée, 1852)
- Zale lunata (Drury, [1773])
- Zale peruncta (Walker, 1858)
- Zale setipes (Guenée, 1852)

===== Eulepidotinae =====
- Antiblemma harmodia Schaus, 1901
- Antiblemma inconspicuum (Herrich-Schäffer, 1870)
- Antiblemma mundicola (Walker, 1865)
- Antiblemma nannodes Hampson, 1926
- Antiblemma punctistriga (Herrich-Schäffer, 1870)
- Antiblemma rufinans (Guenée, 1852)
- Antiblemma sterope (Stoll, 1780)
- Antiblemma versicolor (Herrich-Schäffer, 1870)
- Anticarsia gemmatalis Hübner, 1818
- Athyrma adjutrix of authors (not Cramer, 1780)
- Azeta quassa Walker, 1858
- Azeta versicolor (Fabricius, 1794)
- Azeta uncas Guenée, 1852
- Chamyna homichlodes Hübner, [1821]
- Chamyna modesta Schaus, 1912
- Coenobela joha (Druce, 1898)
- Coenobela paucula (Walker, 1858)
- Dyomyx inferior (Herrich-Schäffer, 1869)
- Dyomyx juno Möschler, 1890
- Ephyrodes cacata Guenée, 1852
- Ephyrodes omicron Guenée, 1852
- Epitausa coppryi (Guenée, 1852)
- Eulepidotis addens (Walker, 1858)
- Eulepidotis hebe (Möschler, 1890)
- Eulepidotis merricki (Holland, 1902)
- Eulepidotis metamorpha Dyar, 1914
- Eulepidotis modestula (Herrich-Schäffer, 1869)
- Eulepidotis reflexa (Herrich-Schäffer, 1869)
- Eulepidotis striaepuncta (Herrich-Schäffer, 1868)
- Glenopteris occulifera Hübner, [1821]
- Goniocarsia electrica (Schaus, 1894)
- Litoprosopus hatuey (Poey, 1832)
- Macrodes cynara (Cramer, 1775)
- Manbuta pyraliformis (Walker, 1858)
- Massala abdara (Herrich-Schäffer, [1869])
- Massala obvertens (Walker, 1858)
- Metallata absumens (Walker, 1862)
- Phyprosopus pardan Dyar, 1921
- Phyprosopus tristriga (Möschler, 1890)
- Renodes aequalis (Walker, [1866])
- Renodes eupithecioides (Walker, 1858)
- Syllectra congemmalis Hübner, 1823
- Syllectra erycata (Cramer, 1780)

==== Euteliidae ====
===== Euteliinae =====
- Eutelia ablatrix (Guenée, 1852)
- Eutelia caustiplaga Hampson, 1905
- Eutelia furcata (Walker, 1865)
- Paectes abrostoloides (Guenée, 1852)
- Paectes arcigera (Guenée, 1852)
- Paectes canofusa (Hampson, 1898)
- Paectes devincta (Walker, 1858)
- Paectes lunodes (Guenée, 1852)
- Paectes obrotunda (Guenée, 1852)
- Paectes vittata (Möschler, 1890)

===== Stictopterinae =====
- Nagara vitrea (Guenée, 1852)

==== Nolidae ====
===== Nolinae =====
- Nola baracoa Schaus, 1921
- Nola bistriga (Möschler, 1890)
- Nola cereella (Bosc, [1800])
- Nola cubensis Schaus, 1921
- Nola folgona Schaus, 1921

===== Chloephorinae =====
- Garella nilotica (Rogenhofer, 1881)
- Iscadia aperta Walker, 1857
- Iscadia furcifera (Walker, 1865)

===== Collomeninae =====
- Collomena filifera (Walker, 1857)
- Concana mundissima Walker, [1858]
- Motya abseuzalis Walker, 1859
- Motya ferrocana (Walker, 1857)

===== Afridinae =====
- Afrida charientisma Dyar, 1913
- Afrida cosmiogramma Dyar, 1913
- Afrida interdicta Dyar, 1913

==== Noctuidae ====
===== Plusiinae =====
- Argyrogramma verruca (Fabricius, 1794)
- Autoplusia egena (Guenée, 1852)
- Chrysodeixis includens (Walker, [1858])
- Ctenoplusia calceolaris (Walker, [1858])
- Ctenoplusia oxygramma (Geyer, 1832)
- Enigmogramma admonens (Walker, [1858])
- Enigmogramma antillea Becker, 2001
- Enigmogramma basigera (Walker, 1865)
- Mouralia tinctoides (Guenée, 1852)
- Notioplusia illustrata (Guenée, 1852)
- Rachiplusia ou (Guenée, 1852)
- Trichoplusia ni (Hübner, [1803])

===== Bagisarinae =====
- Amyna axis (Guenée, 1852)
- Bagisara repanda (Fabricius, 1793)
- Bagisara tristicta (Hampson, 1898)

===== Cydosiinae =====
- Cydosia nobilitella (Cramer, [1780])

===== Eustrotiinae =====
- Chobata discalis Walker, [1858]
- Cobubatha metaspilaris Walker, 1863
- Eustrotia girba Druce, 1889
- Marimatha tripuncta (Möschler, 1890)
- Marimatha botyoides (Guenée, 1852)
- Marimatha obliquata (Herrich-Schäffer, 1868)
- Tripudia goyanensis (Hampson, 1910)
- Tripudia grapholithoides (Möschler, 1890)
- Tripudia lamina Pogue, 2009
- Tripudia luda (Druce, 1898)

===== Acontiinae =====
- Ponometia bicolorata (Barnes & McDunnough, 1912)
- Ponometia exigua (Fabricius, 1793)
- Ponometia semiflava (Guenée, 1852)
- Ponometia septuosa (Blanchard & Knudson, 1986)
- Spragueia apicalis (Herrich-Schäffer, 1868)
- Spragueia dama (Guenée, 1852)
- Spragueia margana (Fabricius, 1794)
- Spragueia pantherula (Herrich-Schäffer, 1868)
- Spragueia perstructana (Walker, 1865)
- Tarache isolata (Todd, 1960)
- Tarache tetragona (Walker, [1858])

===== Diphtherinae =====
- Diphthera festiva (Fabricius, 1775)

===== Acronictinae =====
- Chytonidia chloe Schaus, 1914
- Simyra insularis (Herrich-Schäffer, 1868)

===== Amphipyrinae =====
- Cropia connecta (Smith, 1894)
- Cropia indigna (Walker, [1858])
- Cropia infusa (Walker, [1858])
- Cropia subapicalis (Walker, 1858)
- Cropia templada (Schaus, 1906)
- Fracara viridata (Stoll, 1782)
- Metaponpneumata rogenhoferi Möschler, 1890
- Paratrachaea berylloides (Hampson, 1908)

===== Oncocnemidinae =====
- Antachara diminuta (Guenée, 1852)
- Catabenoides vitrina (Walker, 1857)
- Neogalea sunia (Guenée, 1852)

===== Agaristinae =====
- Caularis lunata Hampson, 1904
- Eudryas unio (Hübner, [1831])
- Euscirrhopterus poeyi Grote, 1866
- Neotuerta hemicycla (Hampson, 1904)
- Neotuerta sabulosa (Todd, 1966)
- Seirocastnia tribuna (Hübner, [1821])

===== Condicinae =====
- Condica albigera (Guenée, 1852)
- Condica berinda Druce, 1889
- Condica circuita (Guenée, 1852)
- Condica concisa (Walker, 1856)
- Condica cupentia (Cramer, 1780)
- Condica mimica Hampson, 1908
- Condica mobilis (Walker, [1857])
- Condica punctifera (Walker, [1857])
- Condica selenosa Guenée, 1852
- Condica stelligera (Guenée, 1852)
- Condica subaurea (Guenée, 1852)
- Condica subornata Walker, 1865
- Condica sutor (Guenée, 1852)
- Homophoberia apicosa (Haworth, [1809])
- Micrathetis dasarada (Druce, 1898)
- Micrathetis triplex (Walker, 1857)
- Perigea funerea Schaus, 1911
- Perigea glaucoptera (Guenée, 1852)
- Perigea pectinata (Herrich-Schäffer, 1868)

===== Heliothinae =====
- Helicoverpa zea (Boddie, 1850)
- Heliothis subflexa (Guenée, 1852)
- Heliothis virescens (Fabricius, 1777)

===== Eriopinae =====
- Callopistria floridensis (Guenée, 1852)
- Callopistria jamaicensis (Möschler, 1886)
- Callopistria mollissima (Guenée, 1852)

===== Noctuinae =====
- Agrotis apicalis Herrich-Schäffer, 1868
- Agrotis malefida Guenée, 1852
- Anarta florida (Smith, 1900)
- Anicla infecta (Ochsenheimer, 1816)
- Anicla recondita (Möschler, 1890)
- Bellura matanzasensis (Dyar, 1922)
- Dargida quadrannulata (Morrison, 1876)
- Dypterygia lignaris (Schaus, 1898)
- Dypterygia ordinarius (Butler, 1879)
- Elaphria agrotina (Guenée, 1852)
- Elaphria deliriosa (Walker, 1857)
- Elaphria deltoides (Möschler, 1880)
- Elaphria devara (Druce, 1898)
- Elaphria guttula (Herrich-Schäffer, 1868)
- Elaphria haemassa (Hampson, 1909)
- Elaphria hypophaea (Hampson, 1920)
- Elaphria nucicolora (Guenée, 1852)
- Feltia repleta Walker, 1857
- Feltia subterranea (Fabricius, 1794)
- Galgula partita Guenée, 1852
- Glaucicodia leuconephra Hampson, 1910
- Gonodes trapezoides (Herrich-Schäffer, 1868)
- Iodopepla alayoi Todd, 1964
- Lacinipolia calcaricosta Todd & Poole, 1981
- Lacinipolia distributa (Möschler, 1886)
- Lacinipolia parvula (Herrich-Schäffer, 1868)
- Leucania chejela (Schaus, 1921)
- Leucania clarescens Möschler, 1890
- Leucania dorsalis Walker, 1856
- Leucania educata Adams, 2001
- Leucania humidicola Guenée, 1852
- Leucania incognita (Barnes & McDunnough, 1918)
- Leucania inconspicua Herrich-Schäffer, 1868
- Leucania latiuscula Herrich-Schäffer, 1868
- Leucania lobrega Adams, 2001
- Leucania rawlinsi Adams, 2001
- Leucania secta Herrich-Schäffer, 1868
- Leucania senescens Möschler, 1890
- Leucania toddi Adams, 2001
- Magusa orbifera (Walker, 1857)
- Mamestra soligena Möschler, 1886
- Marilopteryx lamptera (Druce, 1890)
- Marilopteryx lutina (Smith, 1902)
- Mythimna sequax (Franclemont, 1951)
- Mythimna unipuncta (Haworth, 1809)
- Neophaenis respondens (Walker, 1858)
- Orthodes jamaicensis Hampson, 1905
- Orthodes majuscula Herrich-Schäffer, 1868
- Peridroma saucia (Hübner, [1808])
- Phuphena tura (Druce, 1889)
- Prasinopyra metacausta (Hampson, 1910)
- Sesamia cretica Lederer, 1857
- Speocropia scriptura (Walker, 1858)
- Speocropia trichroma (Herrich-Schäffer, 1868)
- Spodoptera albula (Walker, 1859)
- Spodoptera androgea (Stoll, 1782)
- Spodoptera dolichos (Fabricius, 1794)
- Spodoptera eridania (Stoll, 1782)
- Spodoptera frugiperda (Smith, 1797)
- Spodoptera latifascia (Walker, 1856)
- Spodoptera ornithogalli (Guenée, 1852)
- Spodoptera pulchella (Herrich-Schäffer, 1868)
- Tiracola grandirena (Herrich-Schäffer, 1868)
- Xanthopastis regnatrix (Grote, 1863)
