= Erinnyis yucatana =

- Erinnyis yucatana ♂
- Erinnyis yucatana ♂ △

Scientific classification
- Domain: Eukaryota
- Kingdom: Animalia
- Phylum: Arthropoda
- Class: Insecta
- Order: Lepidoptera
- Family: Sphingidae
- Genus: Erinnyis
- Species: E. yucatana

Binomial name
- Erinnyis yucatana (H. Druce, 1888)

Synonyms
- Isognathus yucatana H. Druce, 1888

Species of moth

Erinnyis yucatana is a moth of the family Sphingidae first described by Herbert Druce in 1888. It is found from Mexico and Belize south to at least Costa Rica.

The wingspan is 92–96 mm. Adults are probably on wing year round.
