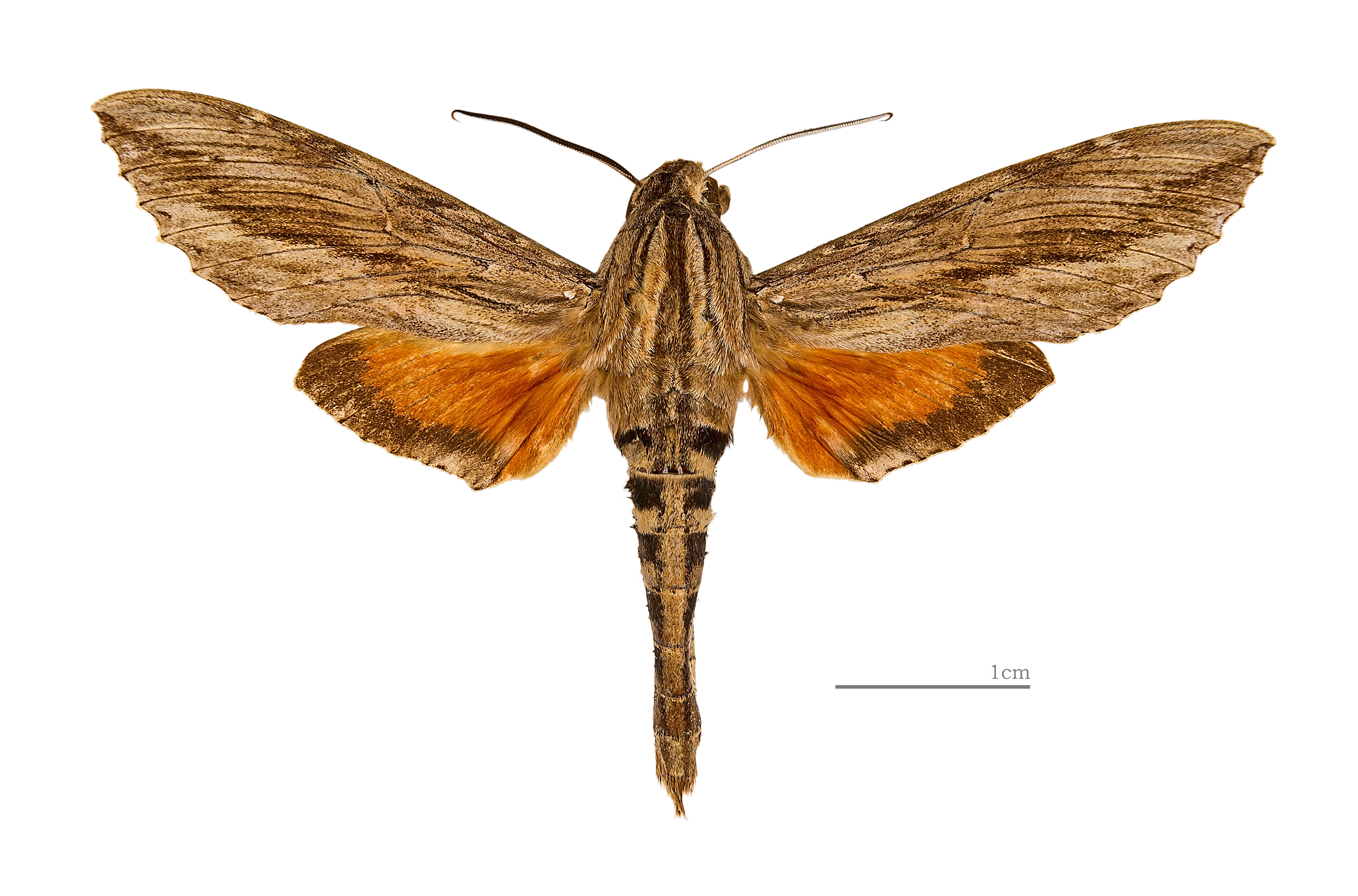
- Erinnyis ello - type species for the genus

Scientific classification
- Domain: Eukaryota
- Kingdom: Animalia
- Phylum: Arthropoda
- Class: Insecta
- Order: Lepidoptera
- Family: Sphingidae
- Subtribe: Dilophonotina
- Genus: Erinnyis; Hübner, 1819

Synonyms
- Anceryx Lucas, 1857; Anceryx Walker, 1856; Dilophonota Burmeister, 1855

= Erinnyis =

Genus of moths

Erinnyis is a genus of moths in the family Sphingidae first described by Jacob Hübner in 1819.

== Species ==
- Erinnyis alope (Drury, 1773)
- Erinnyis crameri (Schaus, 1898)
- Erinnyis ello (Linnaeus, 1758)
- Erinnyis guttularis (Walker, 1856)
- Erinnyis impunctata Rothschild & Jordan, 1903
- Erinnyis lassauxii (Boisduval, 1859)
- Erinnyis obscura (Fabricius, 1775)
- Erinnyis oenotrus (Cramer, 1780)
- Erinnyis pallida Grote, 1865
- Erinnyis stheno (Geyer, 1829)
- Erinnyis yucatana (H. Druce, 1888)

== Gallery ==
Erinnyis alope

Erinnyis crameri

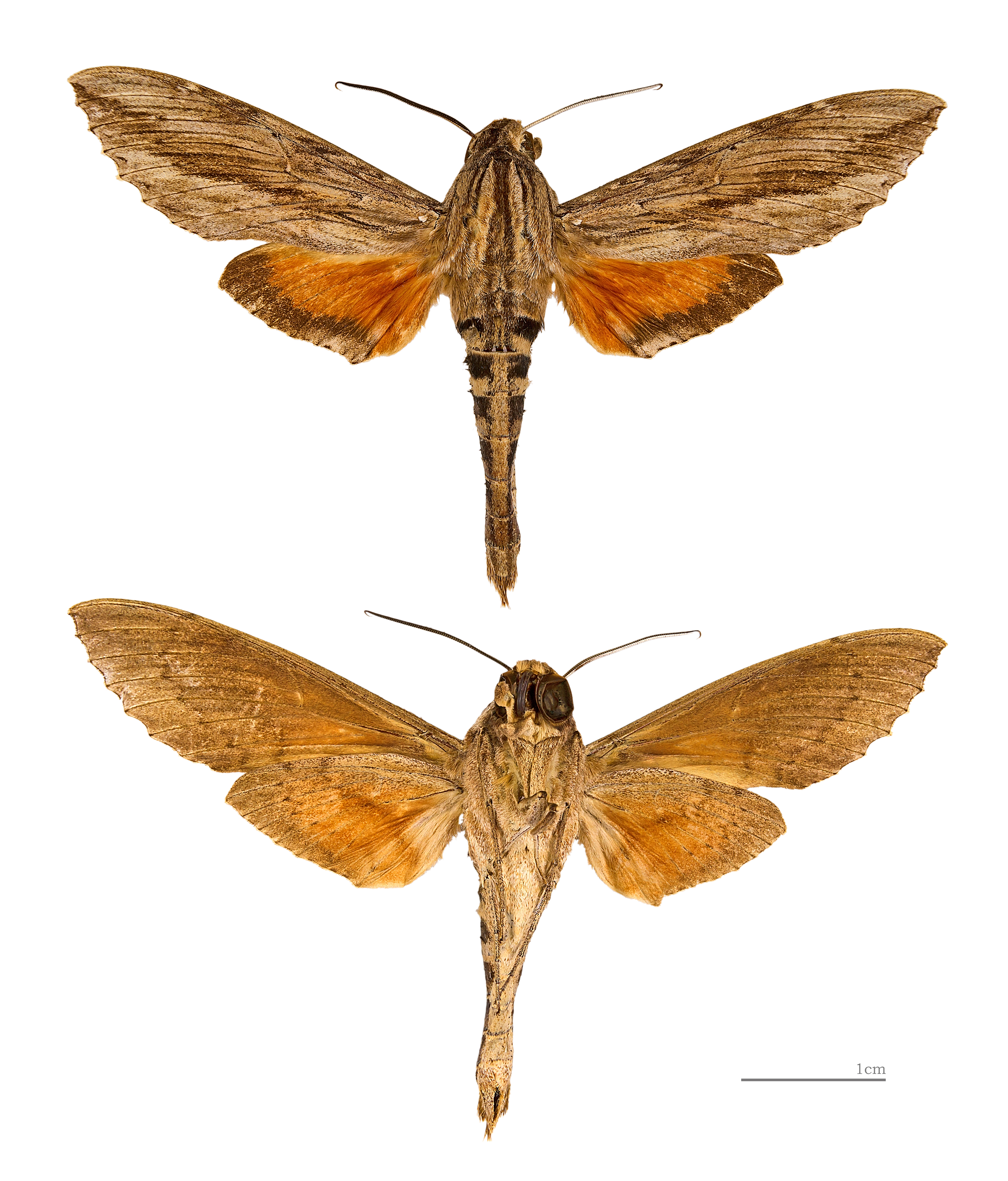
Erinnyis ello

Erinnyis guttularis

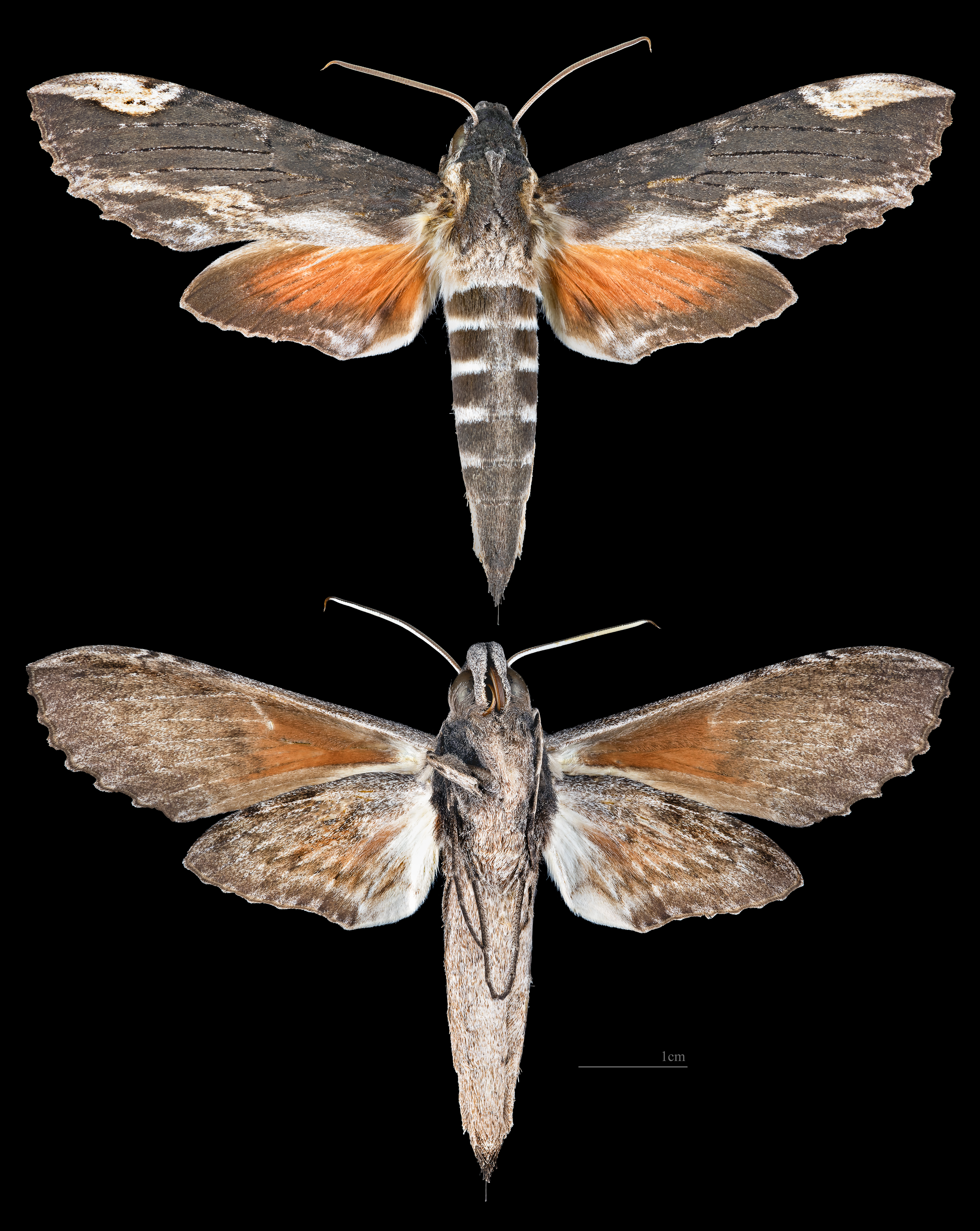
Erinnyis impunctata

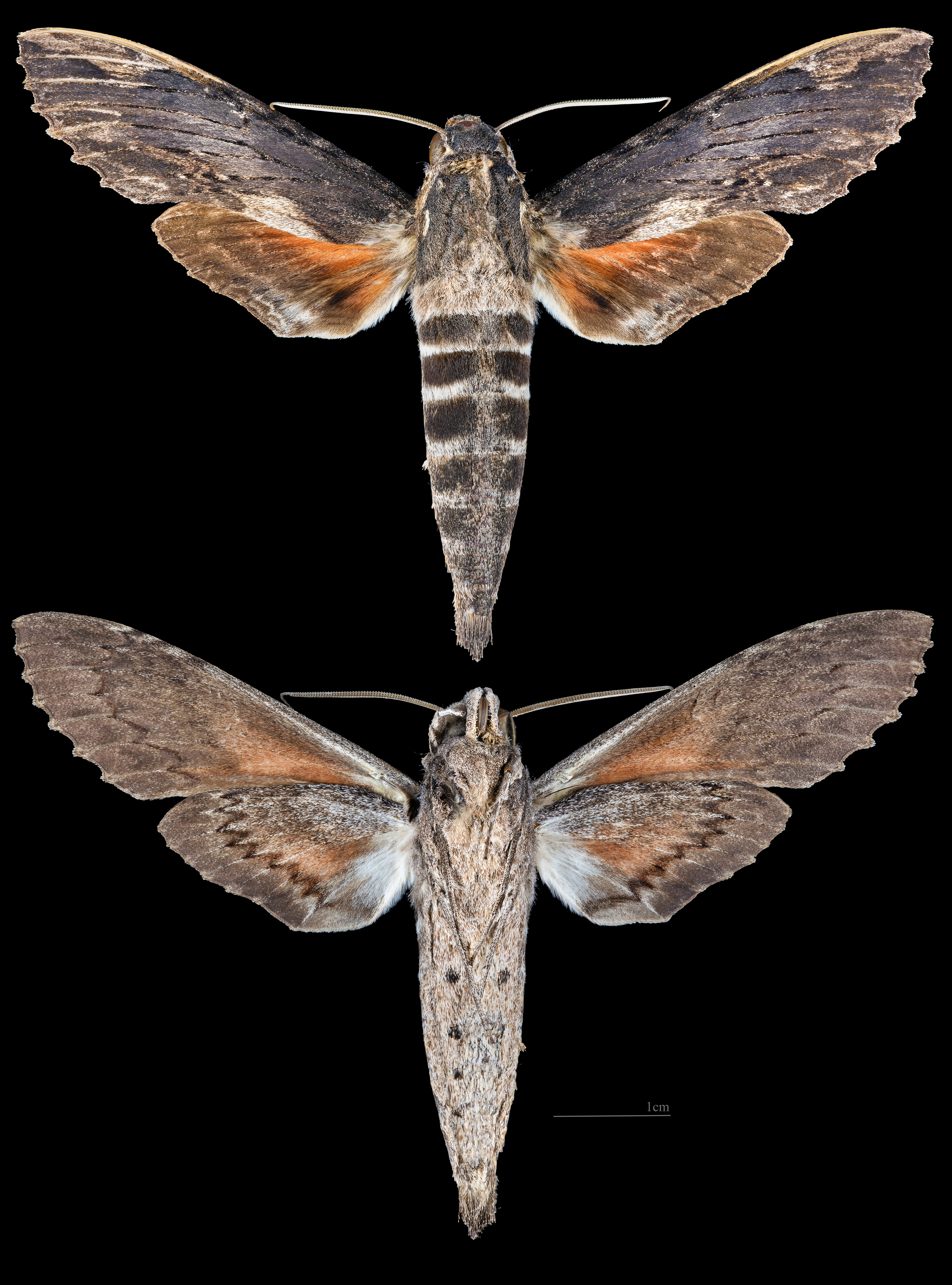
Erinnyis lassauxi

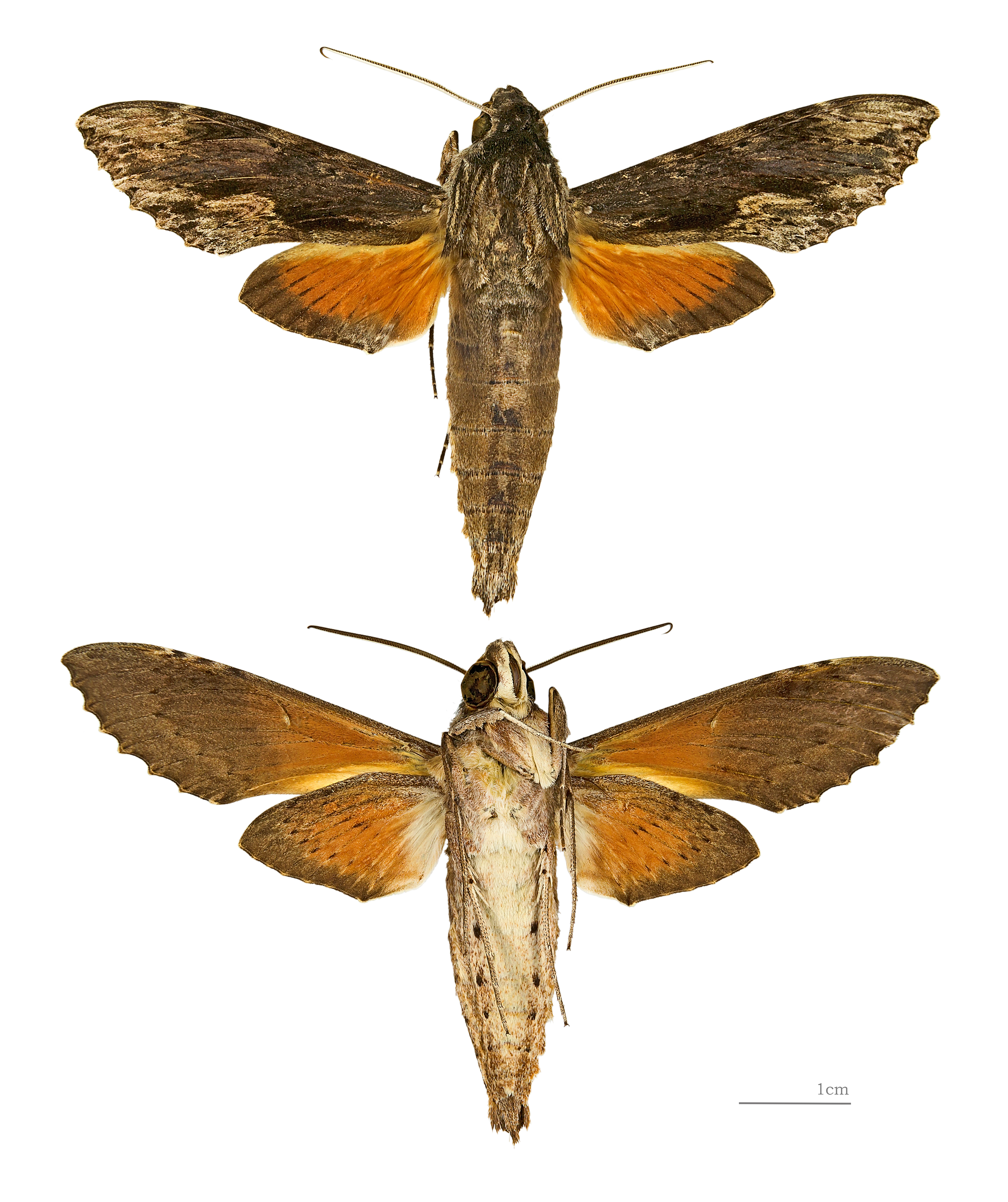
Erinnyis oenotrus

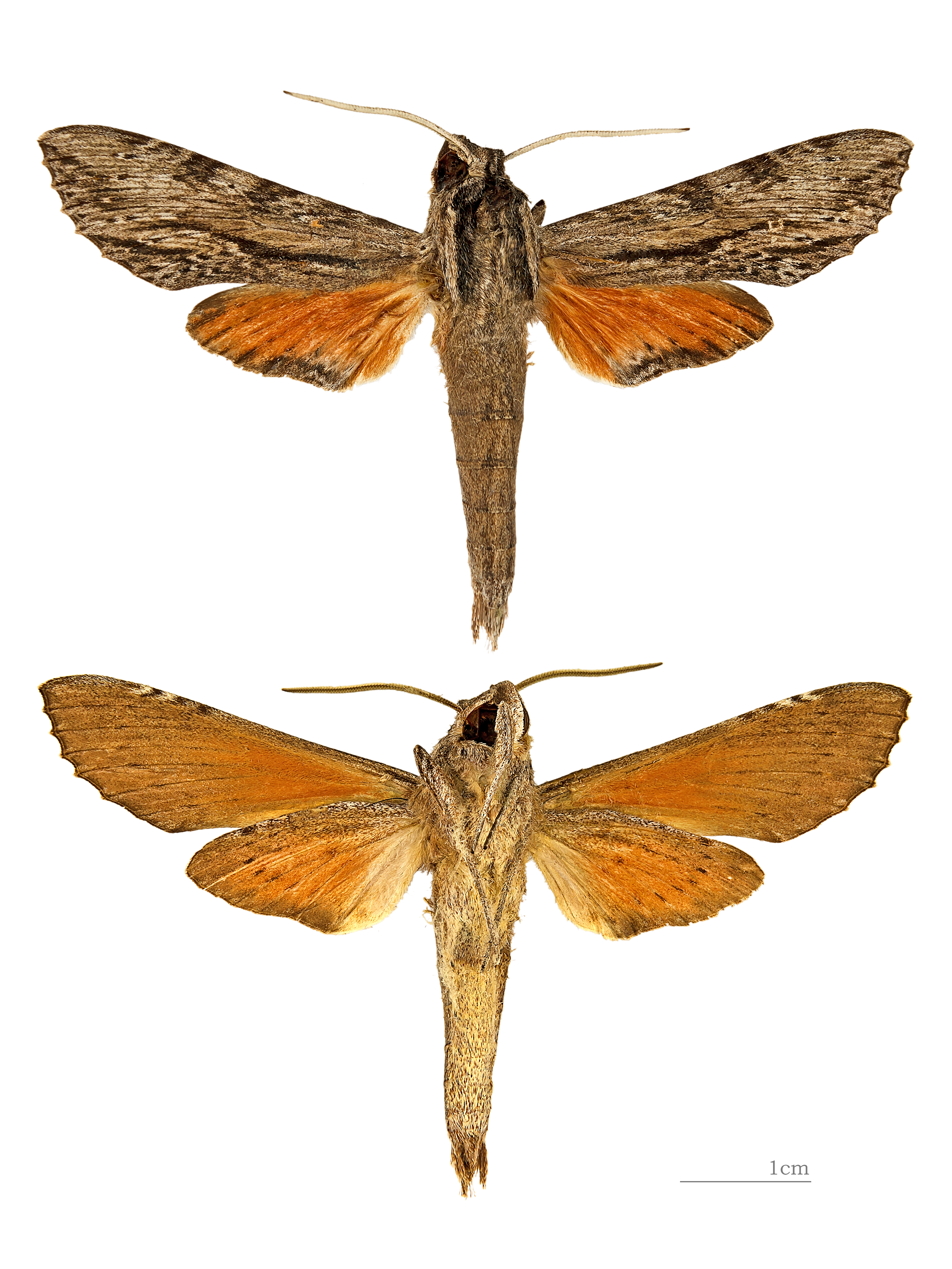
Erinnyis obscura

Erinnyis yucatana
