= Erinnyis alope =

Alope sphinx
- Erinnyis alope ♂
- Erinnyis alope ♂ △

Conservation status
- Secure (NatureServe)

Scientific classification
- Kingdom: Animalia
- Phylum: Arthropoda
- Class: Insecta
- Order: Lepidoptera
- Family: Sphingidae
- Genus: Erinnyis
- Species: E. alope

Binomial name
- Erinnyis alope (Drury, 1770)

Synonyms
- Sphinx alope Drury, 1773; Sphinx fasciata Swainson, 1823; Sphinx flavicans Goeze, 1780; Anceryx edwardsii Butler, 1881

Species of moth

Erinnyis alope, the Alope sphinx, is a moth of the family Sphingidae. It lives from the northern part of South America, through Central America, up to Northern Mexico and the very south of the United States, although strays have been recorded as far north as Arkansas and Kansas.

== Subspecies ==
- Erinnyis alope alope (from northern Argentina and Uruguay north through Central America, Mexico, and the West Indies to southern Florida, southern Texas, southern New Mexico and southern Arizona)
- Erinnyis alope dispersa Kernbach, 1962 (Galapagos Islands)
