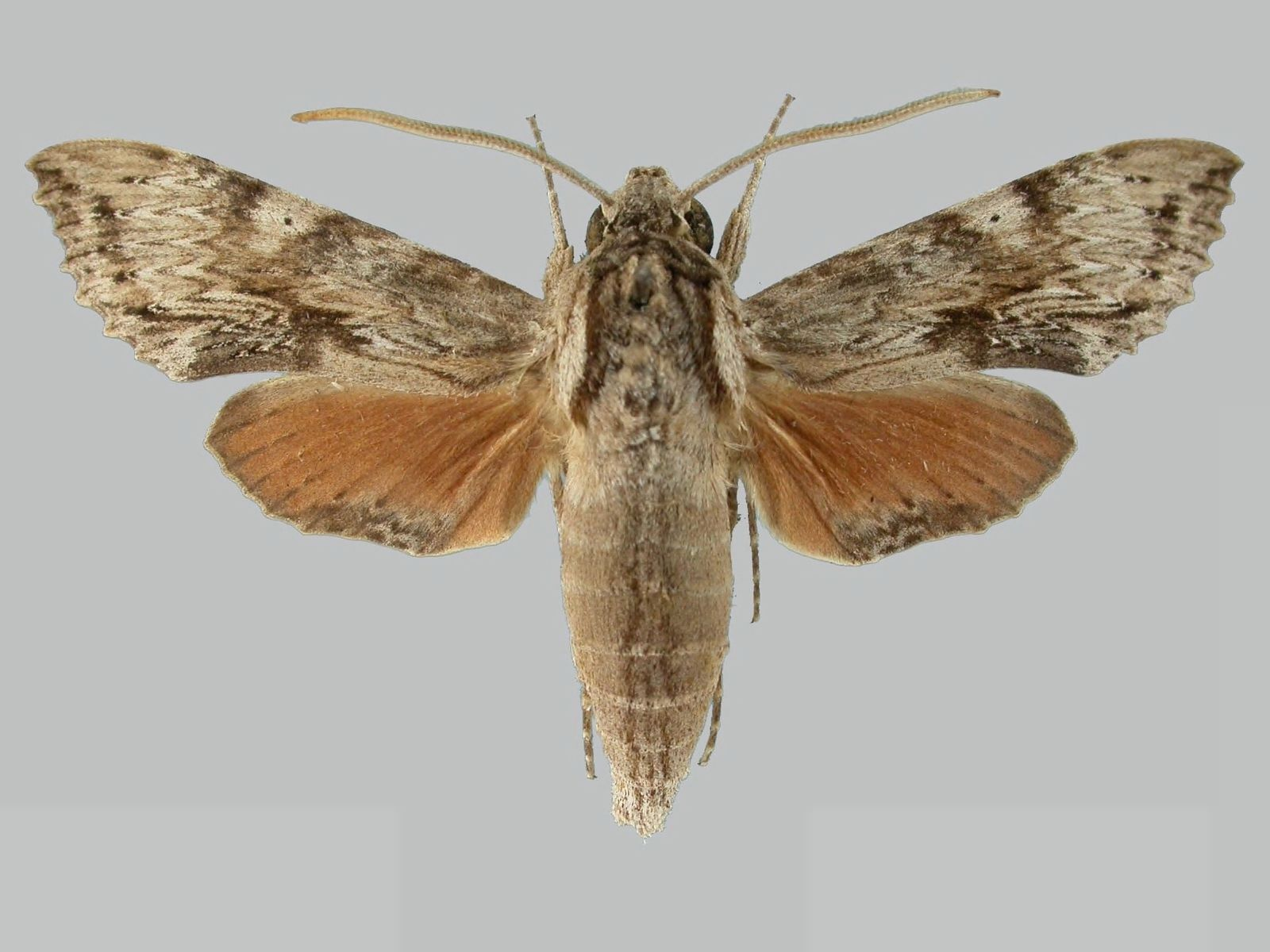

Scientific classification
- Domain: Eukaryota
- Kingdom: Animalia
- Phylum: Arthropoda
- Class: Insecta
- Order: Lepidoptera
- Family: Sphingidae
- Genus: Erinnyis
- Species: E. stheno

Binomial name
- Erinnyis stheno Geyer, 1829

= Erinnyis stheno =

Species of moth

Erinnyis stheno is a moth of the family Sphingidae. It is known from Barbados.
