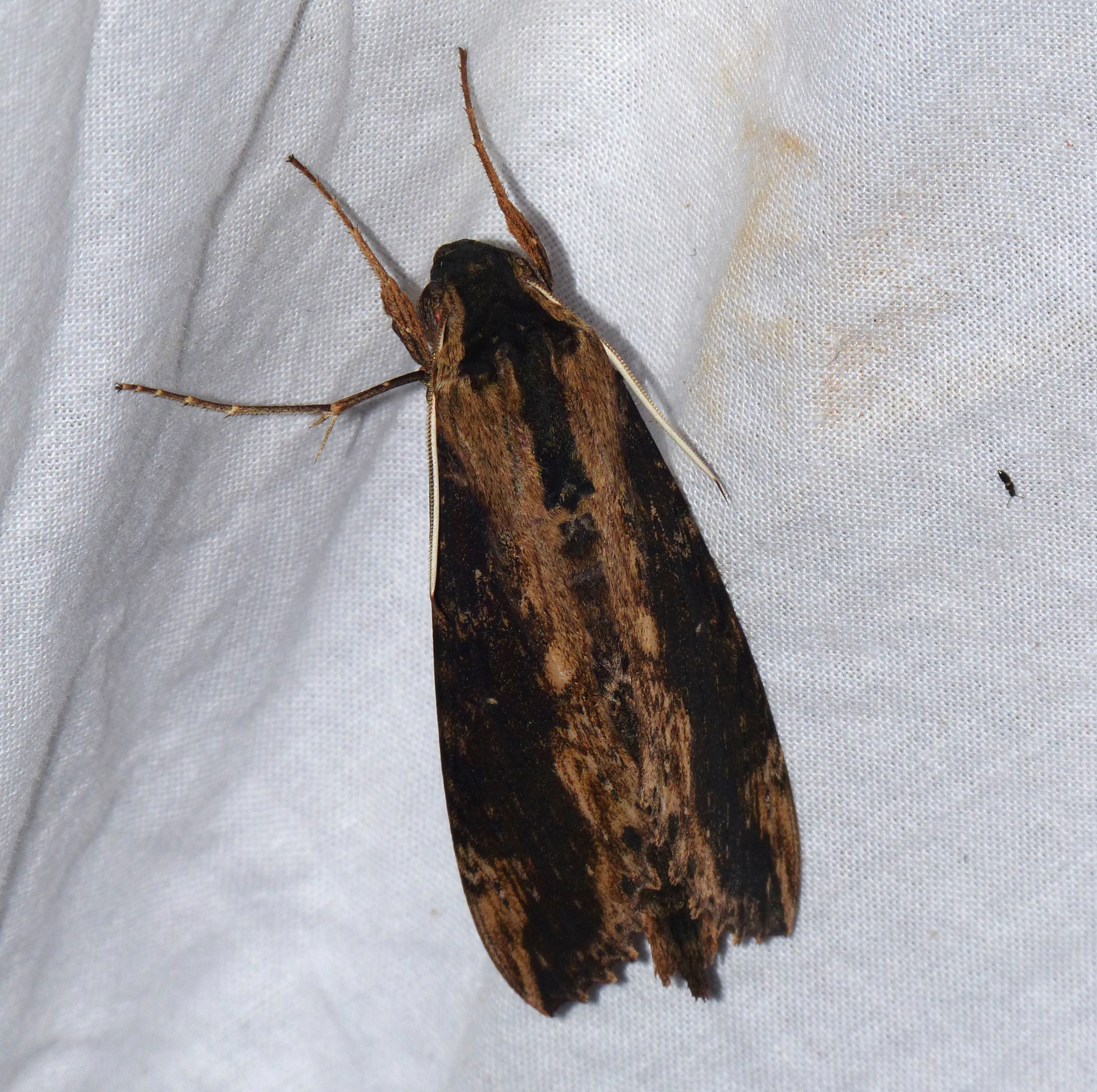

Scientific classification
- Domain: Eukaryota
- Kingdom: Animalia
- Phylum: Arthropoda
- Class: Insecta
- Order: Lepidoptera
- Family: Sphingidae
- Genus: Erinnyis
- Species: E. crameri

Binomial name
- Erinnyis crameri (Schaus, 1898)

Synonyms
- Dilophonota crameri Schaus, 1898

= Erinnyis crameri =

Species of moth

Erinnyis crameri, or Cramer's sphinx, is a small member of the family Sphingidae. The species was first described by William Schaus in 1898.

== Distribution ==
It lives from northern South America, through Central America, and into the lower regions of the United States (Texas and Florida).

== Description ==
Erinnyis crameri ♂

Erinnyis crameri ♂ △

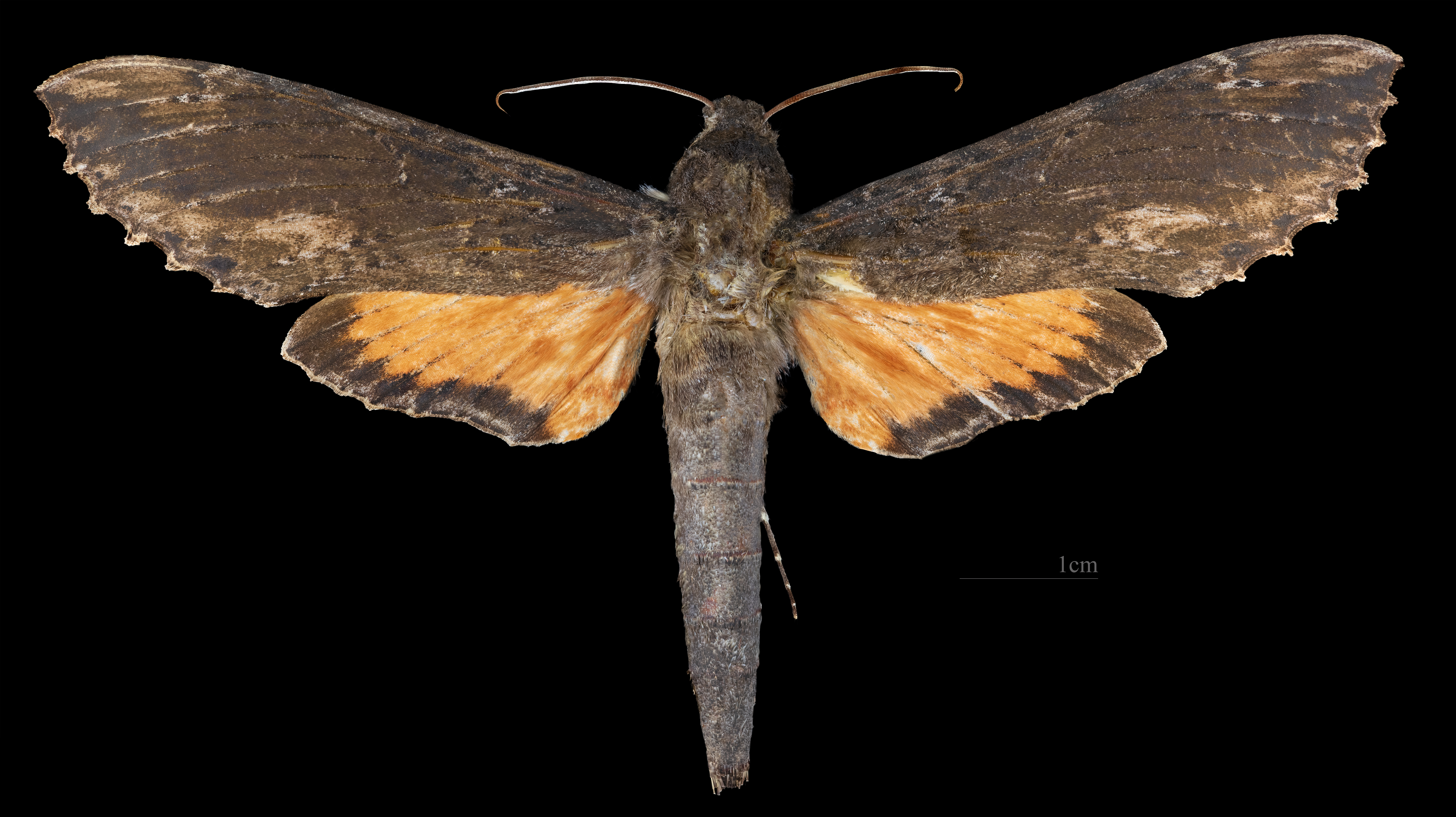
Erinnyis crameri ♀

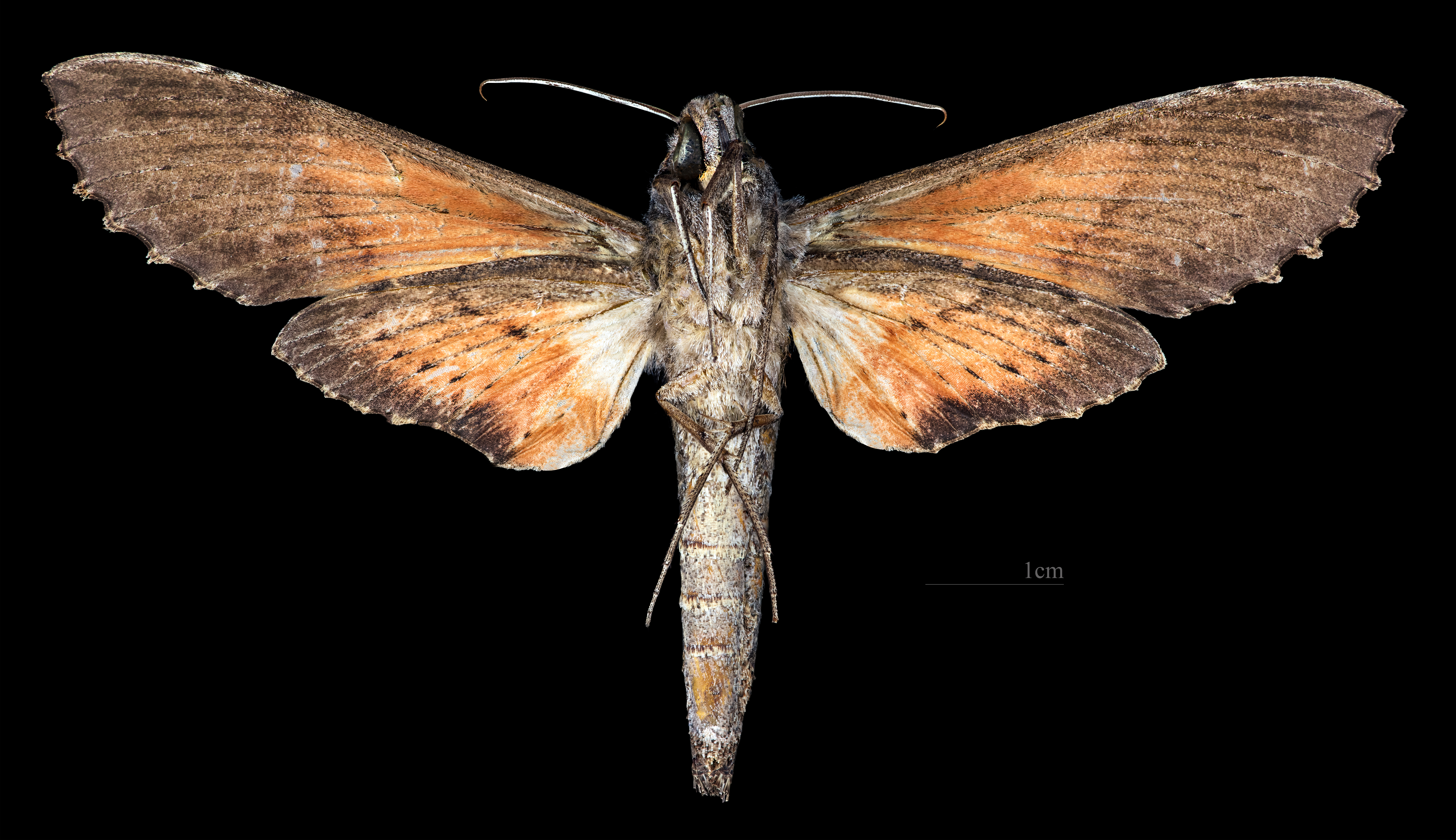
Erinnyis crameri ♀ △
