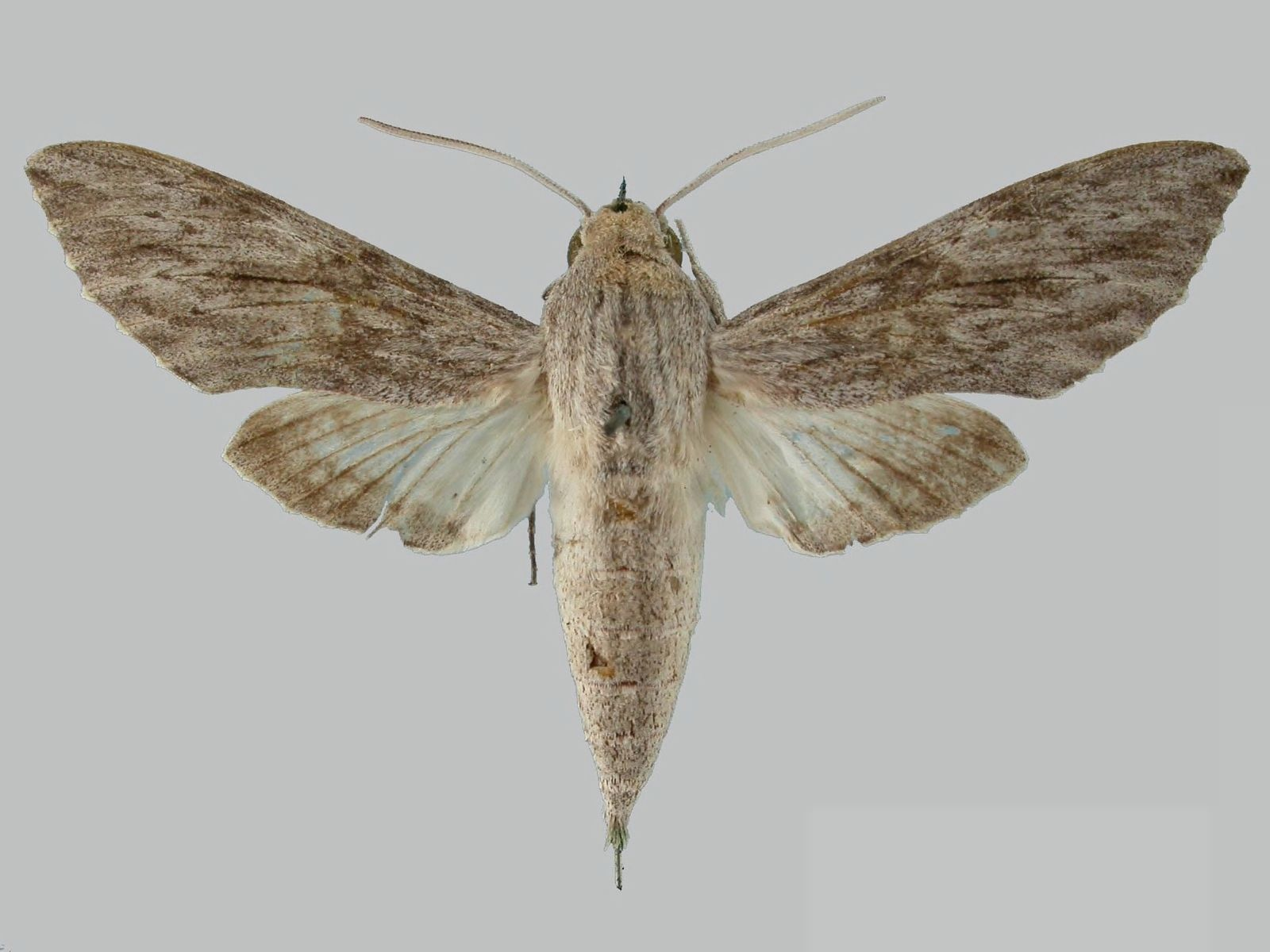

Scientific classification
- Kingdom: Animalia
- Phylum: Arthropoda
- Class: Insecta
- Order: Lepidoptera
- Family: Sphingidae
- Genus: Erinnyis
- Species: E. pallida

Binomial name
- Erinnyis pallida Grote, 1865

Synonyms
- Anceryx suillus Boisduval, 1875 This article incorporates text from this source, which is in the public domain.

= Erinnyis pallida =

Pallid sphinx

Species of moth

Erinnyis pallida, the pallid sphinx, is a moth of the family Sphingidae. The species was first described by Augustus Radcliffe Grote in 1865. It is known to be common in Cuba.

The wingspan is 56–65 mm. Adults are probably on wing year round and possibly feed on the nectar of various flowers, including Saponaria officinalis and Asystasia gangetica.
