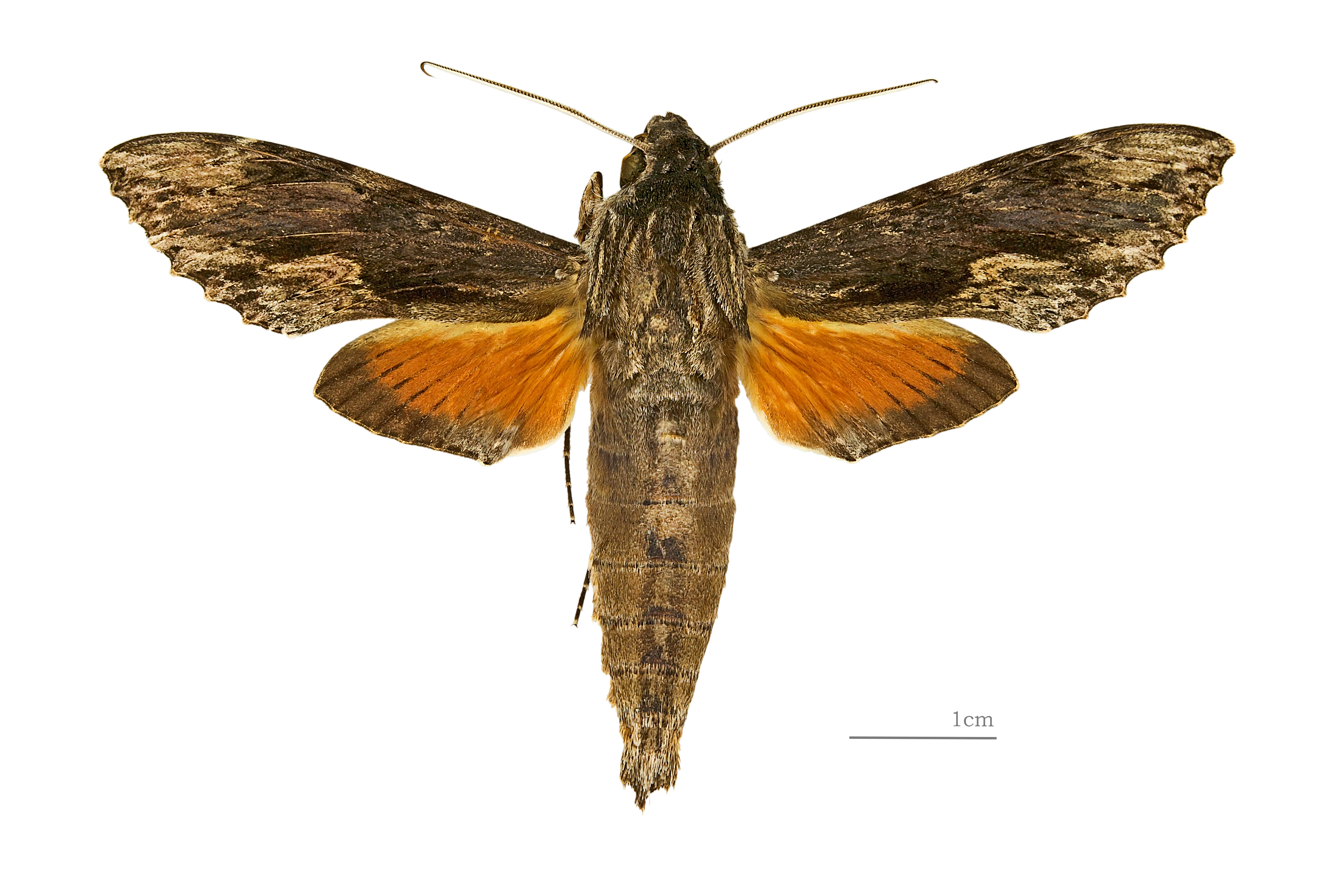
- Erinnyis oenotrus ♂ - MHNT
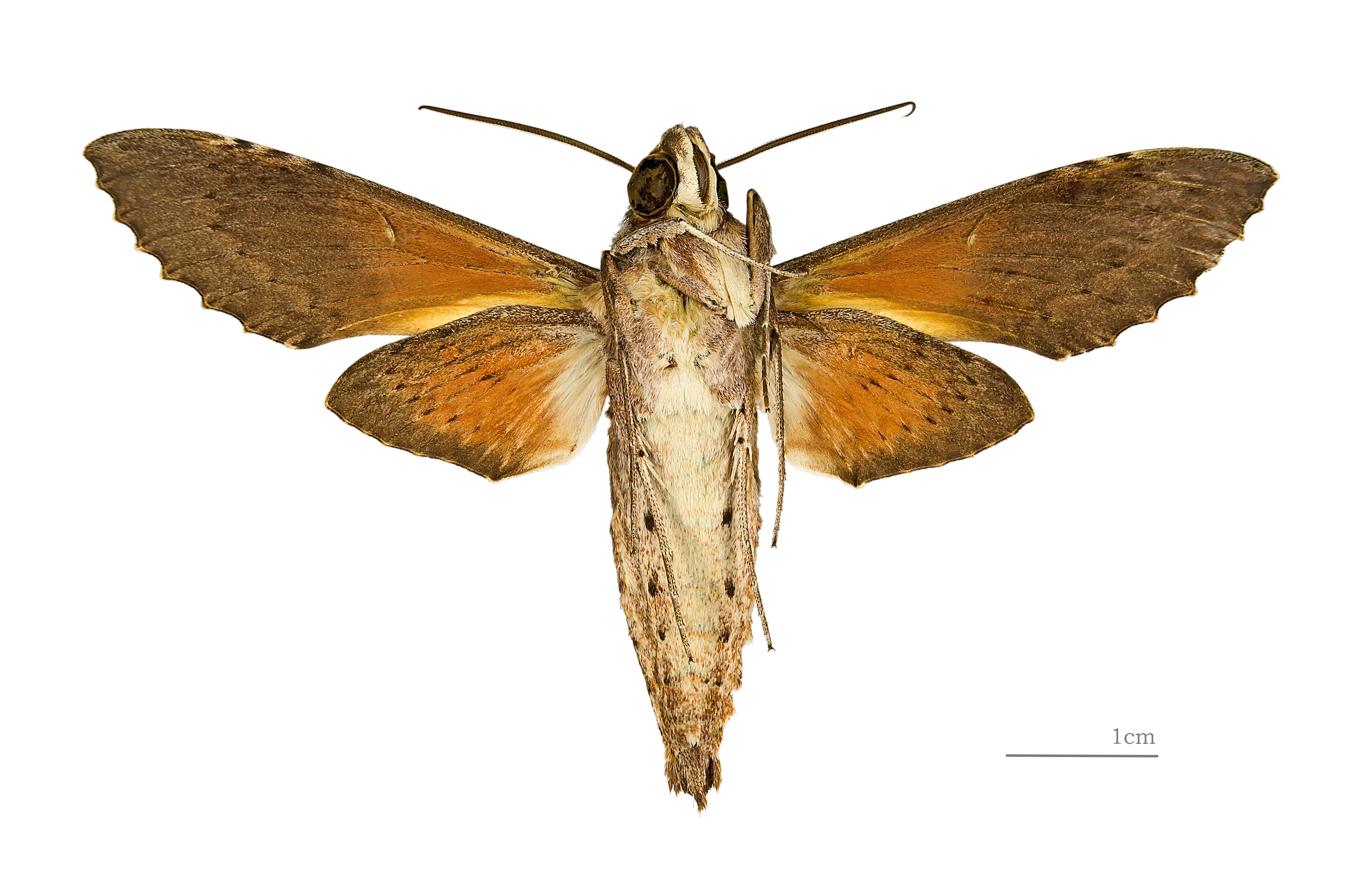
- Erinnyis oenotrus ♂ △ - MHNT

Scientific classification
- Domain: Eukaryota
- Kingdom: Animalia
- Phylum: Arthropoda
- Class: Insecta
- Order: Lepidoptera
- Family: Sphingidae
- Genus: Erinnyis
- Species: E. oenotrus

Binomial name
- Erinnyis oenotrus (Cramer, 1780)

Synonyms
- Sphinx oenotrus Cramer, 1780; Sphinx penaeus Fabricius, 1787; Erinnyis melancholica Grote, 1865; Dilophonota hippothoon Burmeister, 1878; Anceryx piperis Boisduval, 1875

= Erinnyis oenotrus =

Oenotrus sphinx

Species of moth

Erinnyis oenotrus, the Oenotrus sphinx, is a moth of the family Sphingidae.

== Distribution ==
It is found in tropical and subtropical lowlands in Paraguay, Brazil, Bolivia and Argentina, north through Central America, Mexico and the West Indies. Occasional strays have been recorded from Florida and southern Texas.

== Description ==
Erinnyis oenotrus♀

Erinnyis oenotrus♀ △
