= Erinnyis ello =

Ello sphinx
- Male - MHNT
- Male underside - MHNT

Scientific classification
- Kingdom: Animalia
- Phylum: Arthropoda
- Class: Insecta
- Order: Lepidoptera
- Family: Sphingidae
- Genus: Erinnyis
- Species: E. ello

Binomial name
- Erinnyis ello (Linnaeus, 1758)

Synonyms
- Sphinx ello Linnaeus, 1758; Erinnyis cinifera Zikán, 1934; Erinnyis ello omorfia (Mooser, 1942)

Species of moth

Erinnyis ello, the ello sphinx, is a moth of the family Sphingidae. The species was first described by Carl Linnaeus in his 1758 10th edition of Systema Naturae. It is distributed from Argentina through Central America to the United States as far north as Nevada.

The ello sphinx can be parasitized by the braconid wasp Microplitis figueresi.

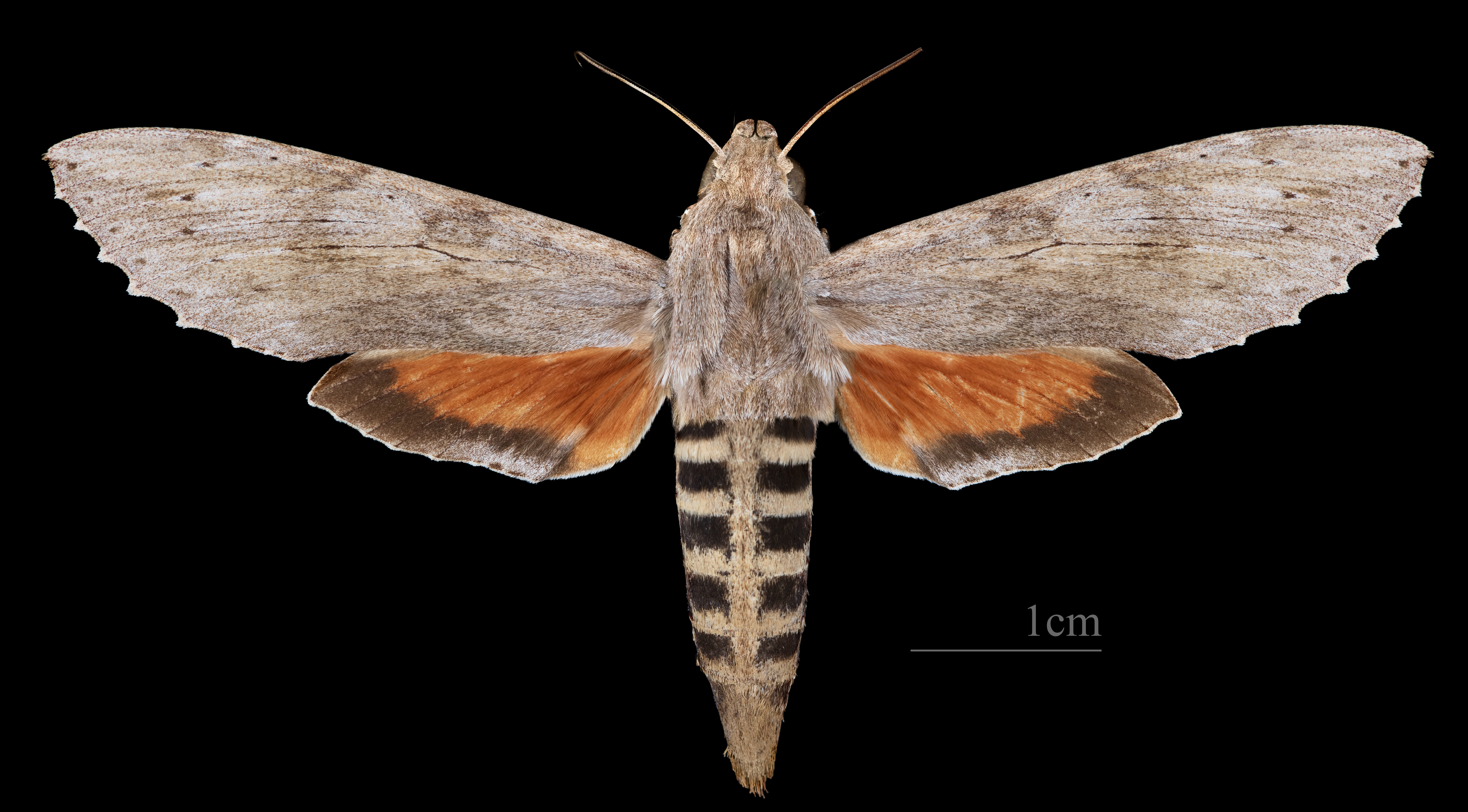
Erinnyis ello ♀

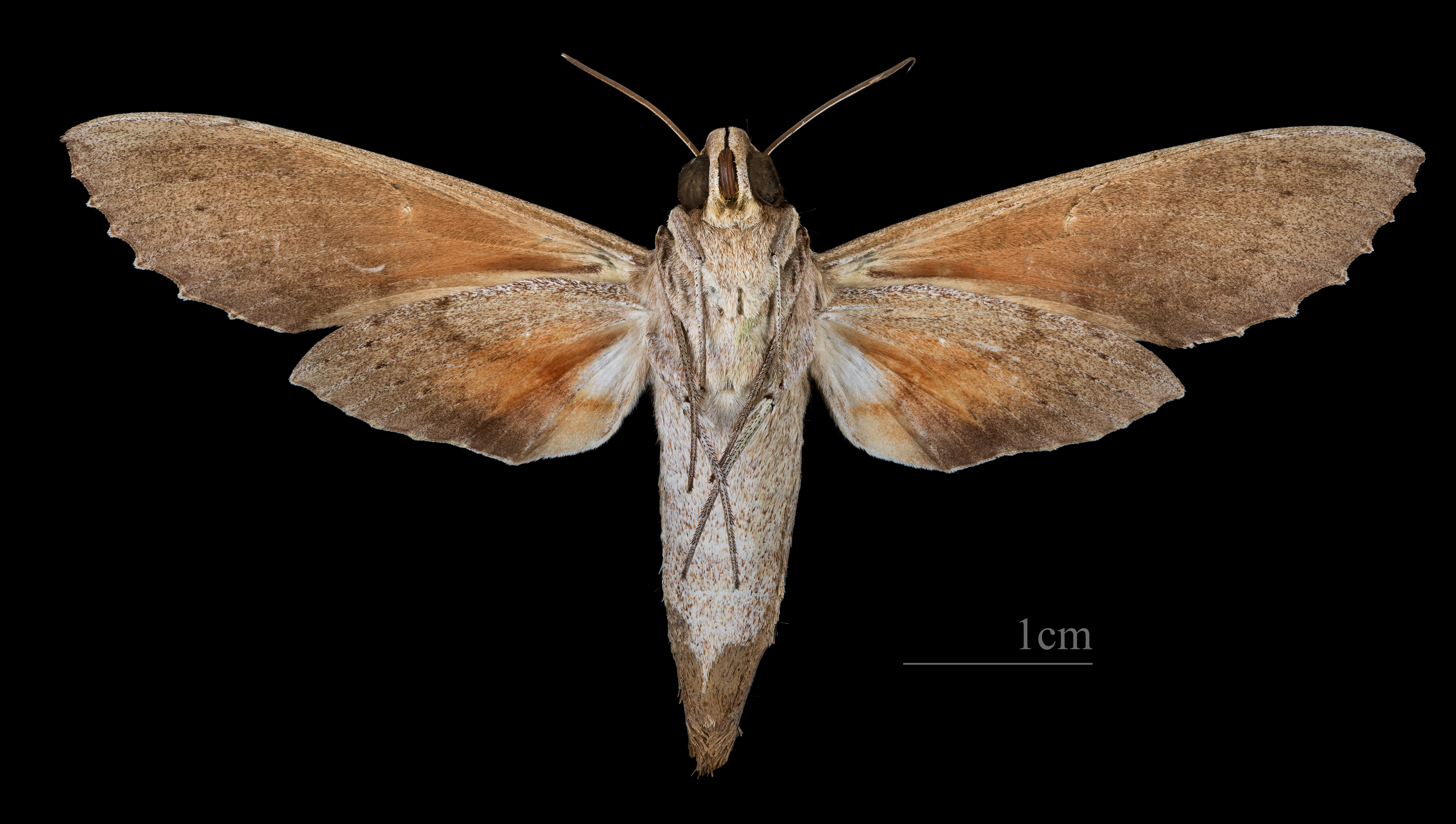
Erinnyis ello ♀ △

== Subspecies ==
- Erinnyis ello ello (Americas)
- Erinnyis ello encantada Kernbach, 1962 (Galápagos Islands)

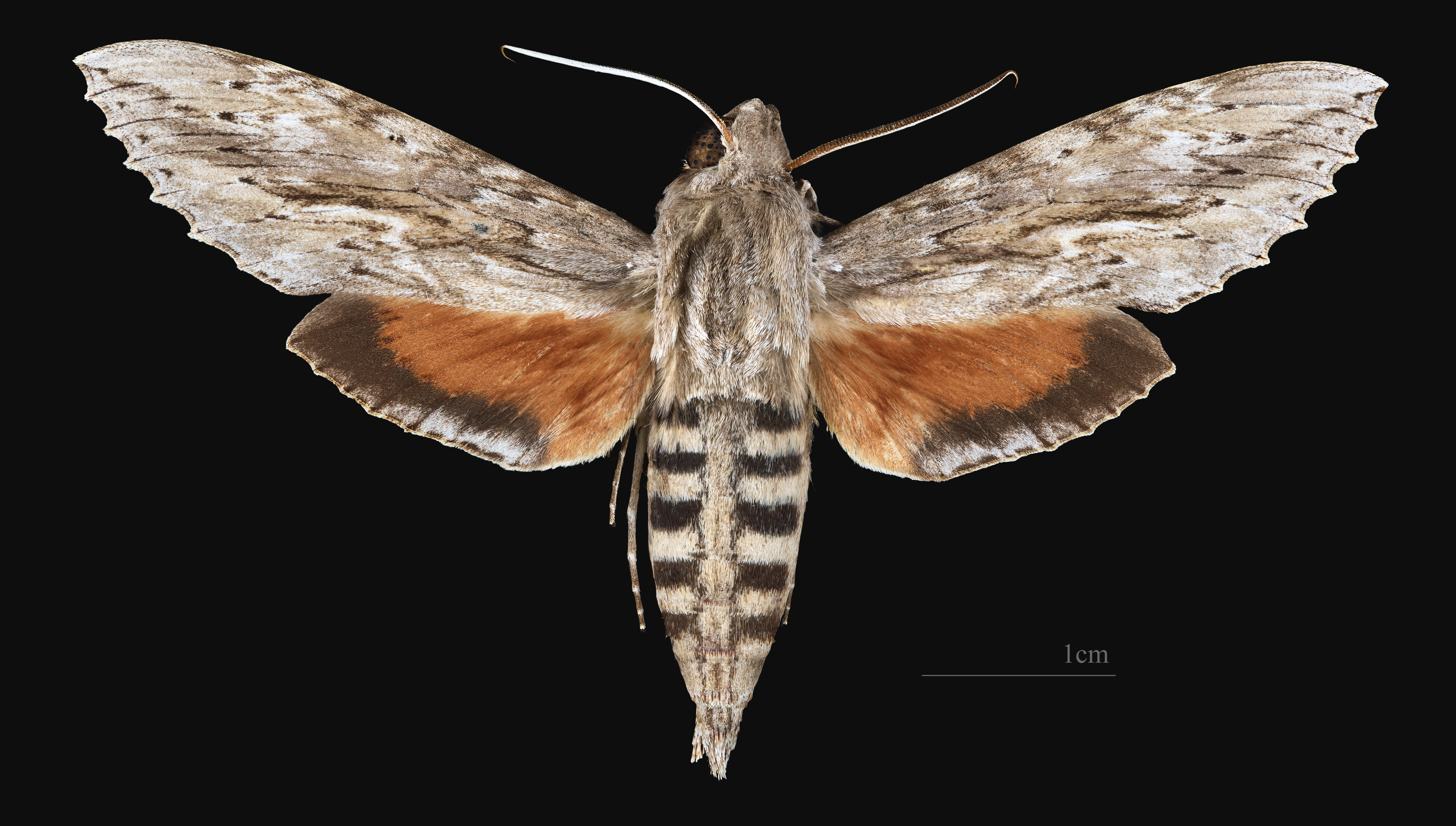
Erinnyis ello encantada ♂

Erinnyis ello encantada ♂ △

Erinnyis ello encantada ♀

Erinnyis ello encantada ♀△
