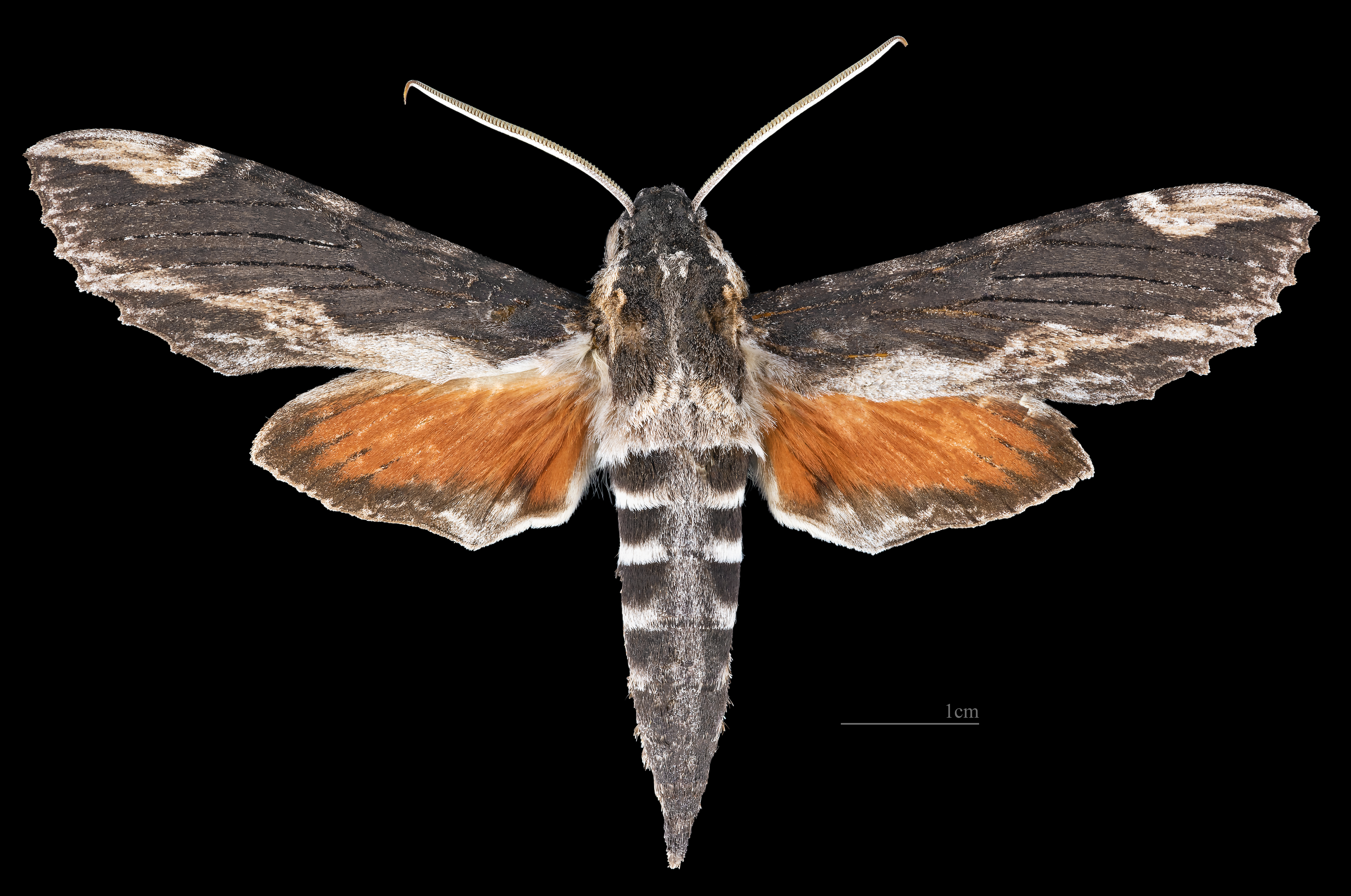
- Male dorsal view
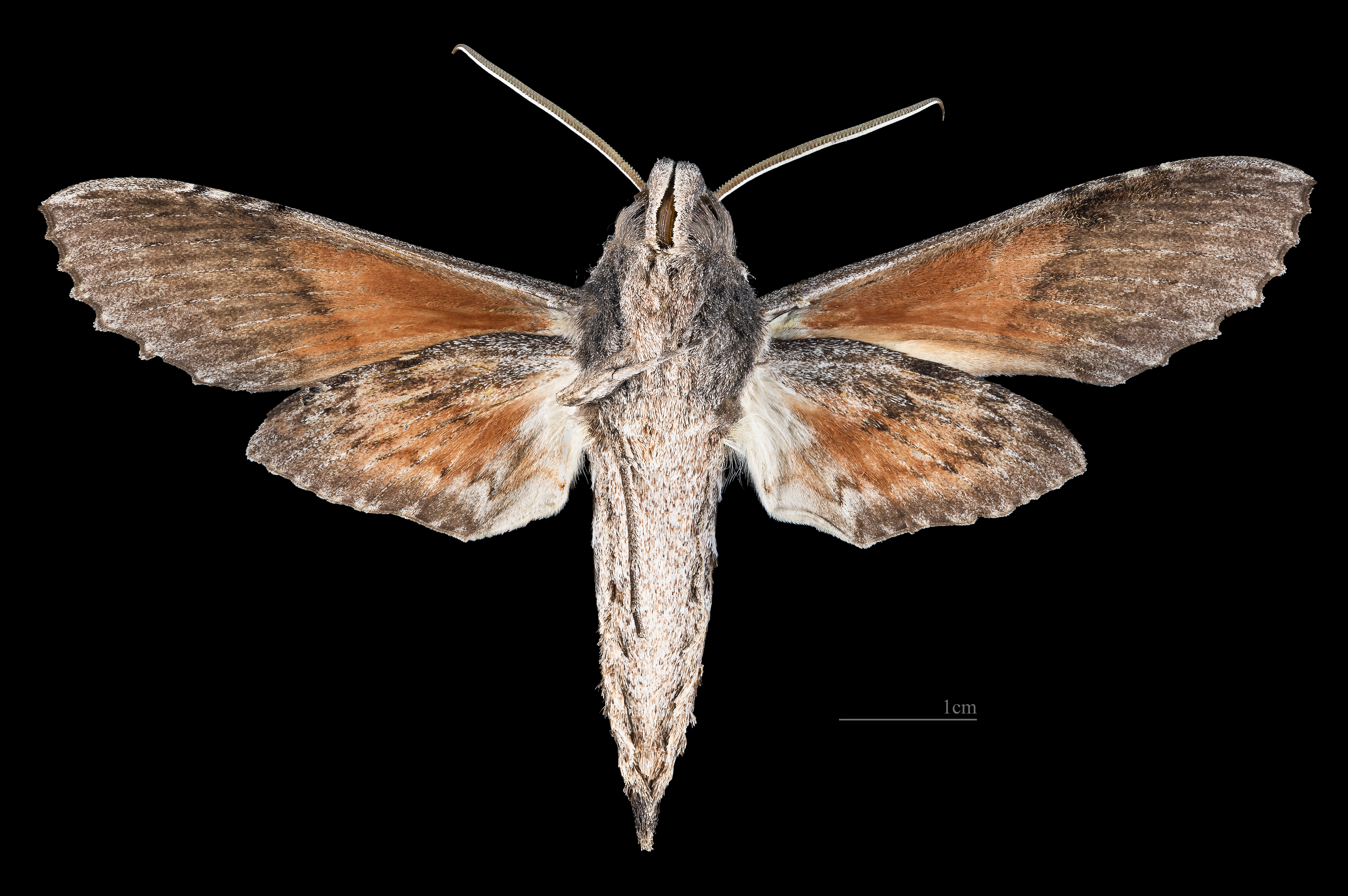
- Male ventral view

Scientific classification
- Domain: Eukaryota
- Kingdom: Animalia
- Phylum: Arthropoda
- Class: Insecta
- Order: Lepidoptera
- Family: Sphingidae
- Genus: Erinnyis
- Species: E. impunctata

Binomial name
- Erinnyis impunctata Rothschild & Jordan, 1903

= Erinnyis impunctata =

Species of moth

Erinnyis impunctata is a species of moth in the family Sphingidae.

== Description ==
It was described by Walter Rothschild and Karl Jordan in 1903.

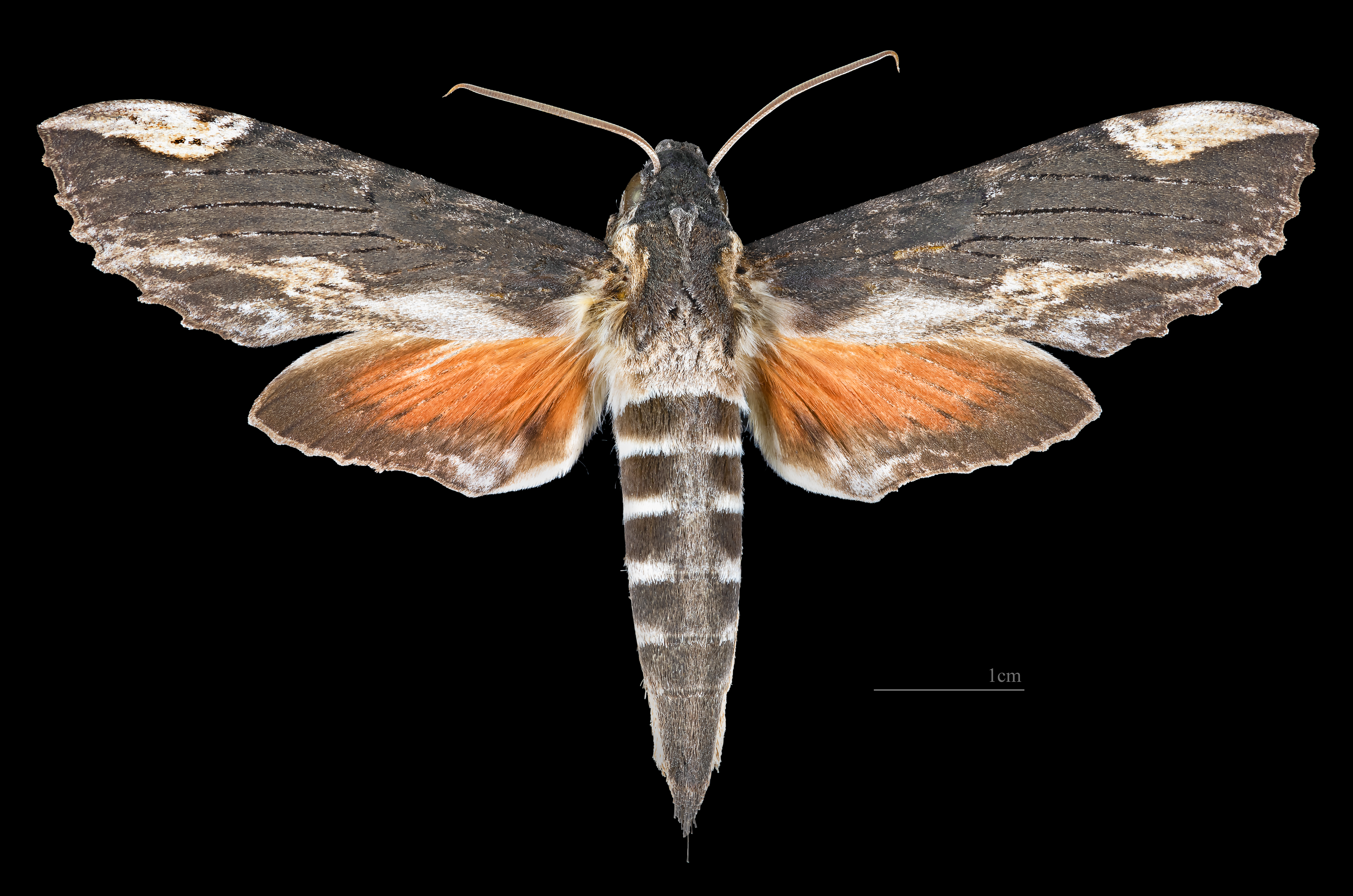
Female dorsal view

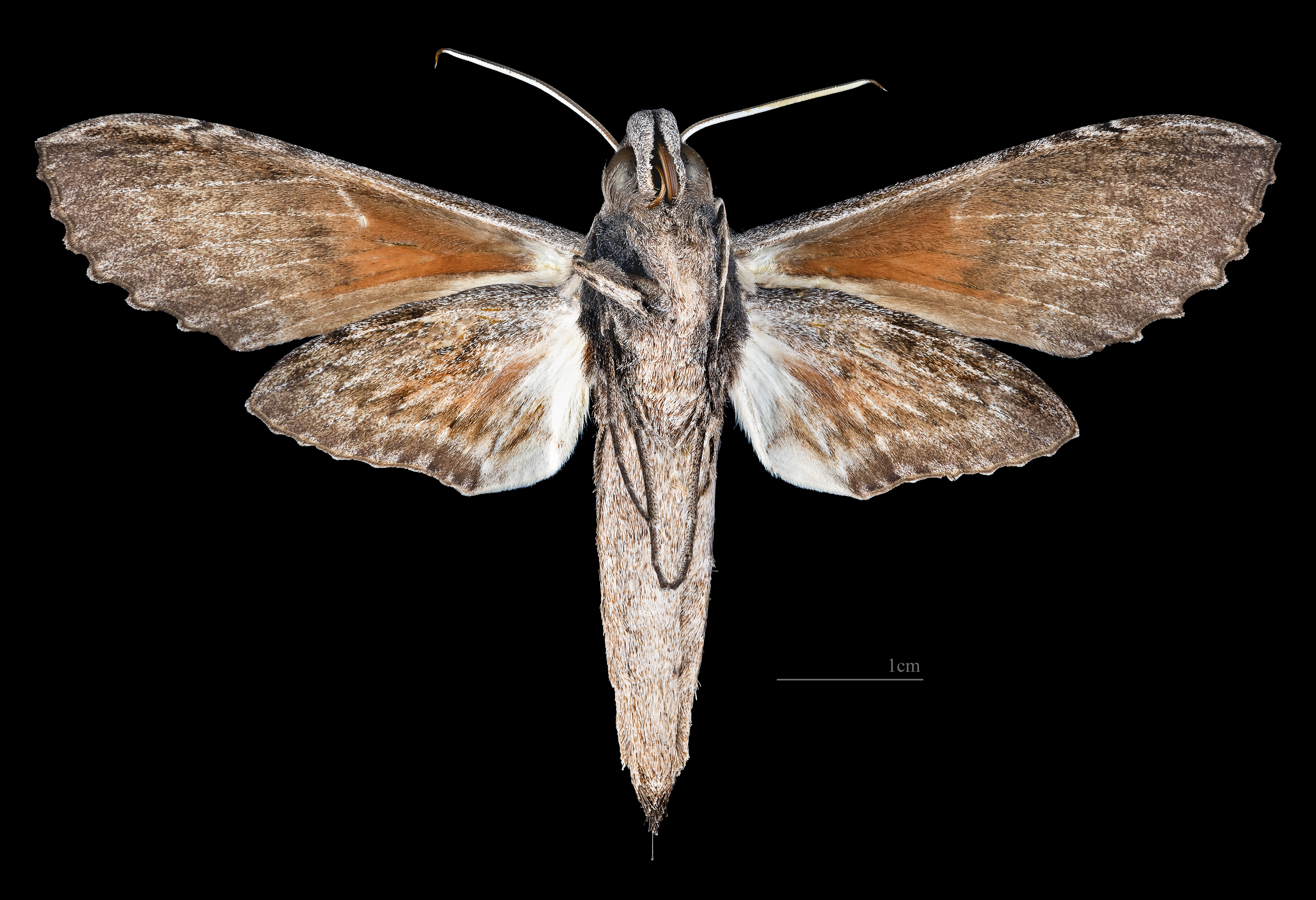
Female ventral view

== Distribution ==
It is known from Peru, Bolivia, Argentina and Venezuela.

== Biology ==
Adults are probably on wing year round, they have been reported in January in Argentina. Adults nectar at flowers.
