= Erinnyis guttularis =

- Erinnyis guttularis ♂
- Erinnyis guttularis ♂ △

Scientific classification
- Domain: Eukaryota
- Kingdom: Animalia
- Phylum: Arthropoda
- Class: Insecta
- Order: Lepidoptera
- Family: Sphingidae
- Genus: Erinnyis
- Species: E. guttularis

Binomial name
- Erinnyis guttularis (Walker, 1856)

Synonyms
- Anceryx guttularis Walker, 1856

Species of moth

Erinnyis guttularis is a species of moth in the family Sphingidae. It was described by Francis Walker in 1856. It is known from Cuba, Jamaica and the Dominican Republic.
