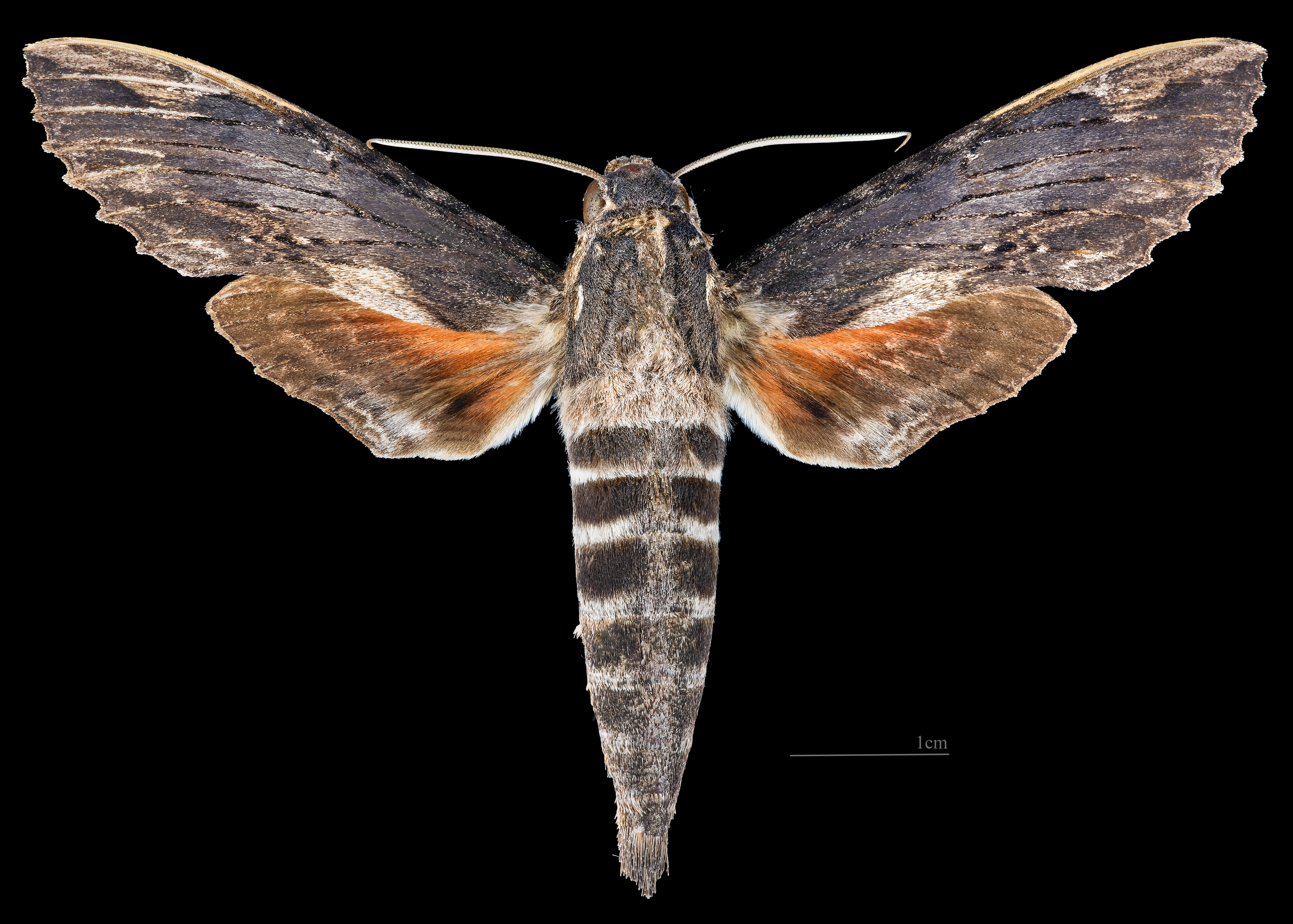
- Male dorsal
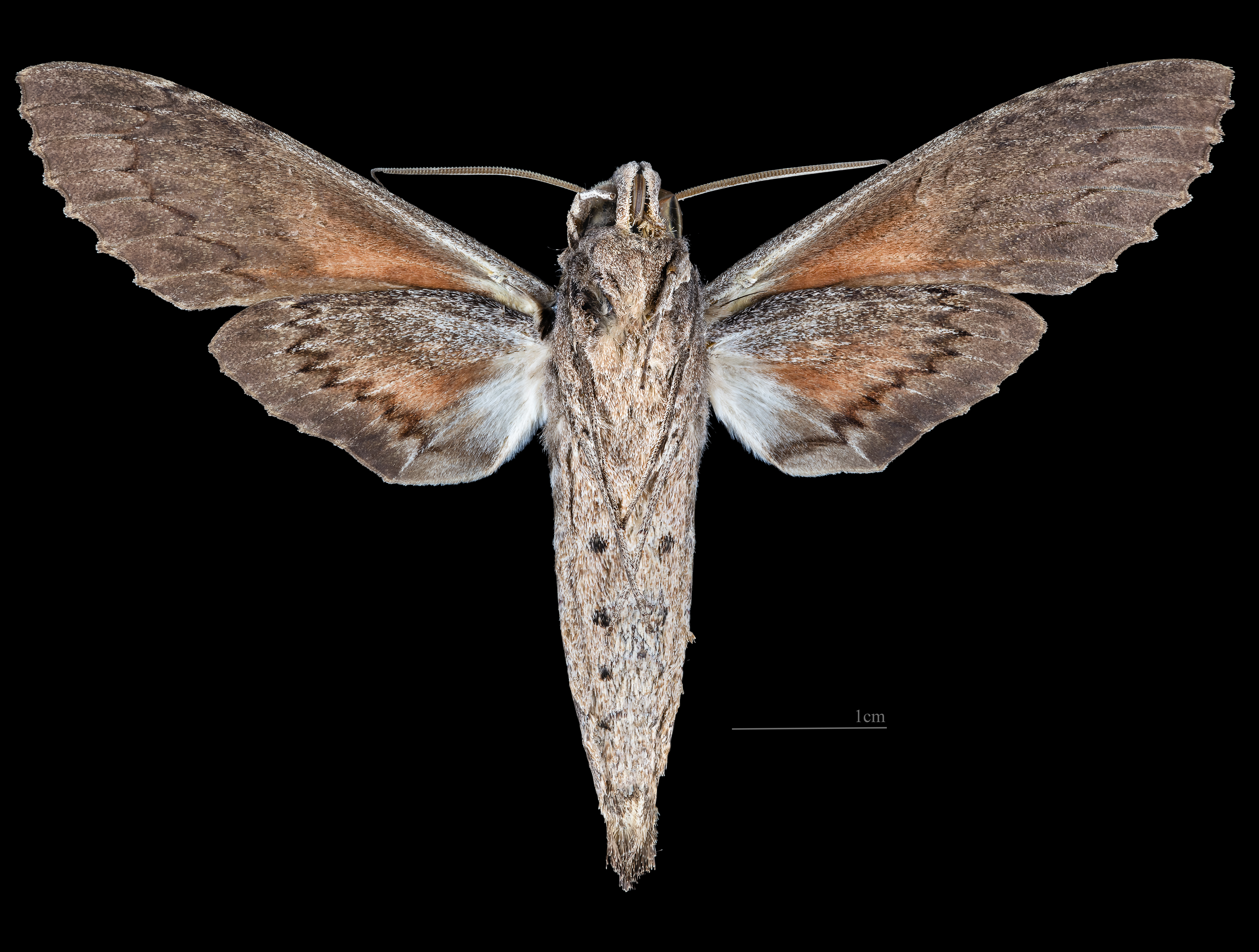
- Male ventral

Conservation status
- Secure (NatureServe)

Scientific classification
- Kingdom: Animalia
- Phylum: Arthropoda
- Class: Insecta
- Order: Lepidoptera
- Family: Sphingidae
- Genus: Erinnyis
- Species: E. lassauxii

Binomial name
- Erinnyis lassauxii (Boisduval, 1859)

Synonyms
- Anceryx lassauxii Boisduval, 1859; Anceryx janiphae Boisduval, 1875; Anceryx omphaleae Boisduval, 1870; Anceryx piperis Schaufuss, 1870; Dilophonota cercyon Burmeister, 1878; Erinnyis merianae Grote, 1865

= Erinnyis lassauxii =

Lassaux's sphinx

Species of moth

Erinnyis lassauxii, or Lassaux's sphinx, is a moth of the family Sphingidae.

== Description ==
The species was first described by Jean Baptiste Boisduval in 1859. It lives from northern Argentina, through Central America, and into the lower United States (Texas, New Mexico, and Arizona).

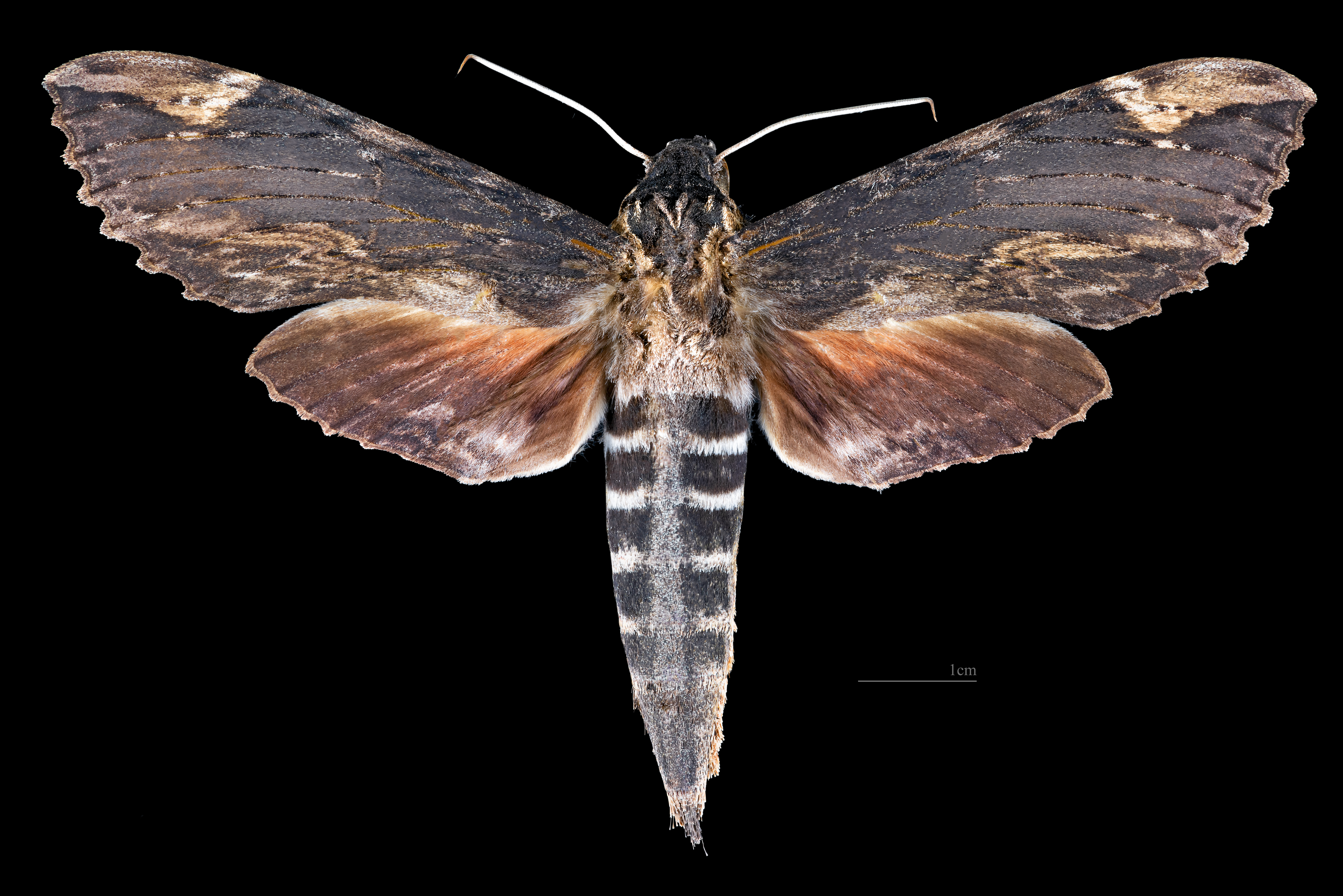
Female dorsal

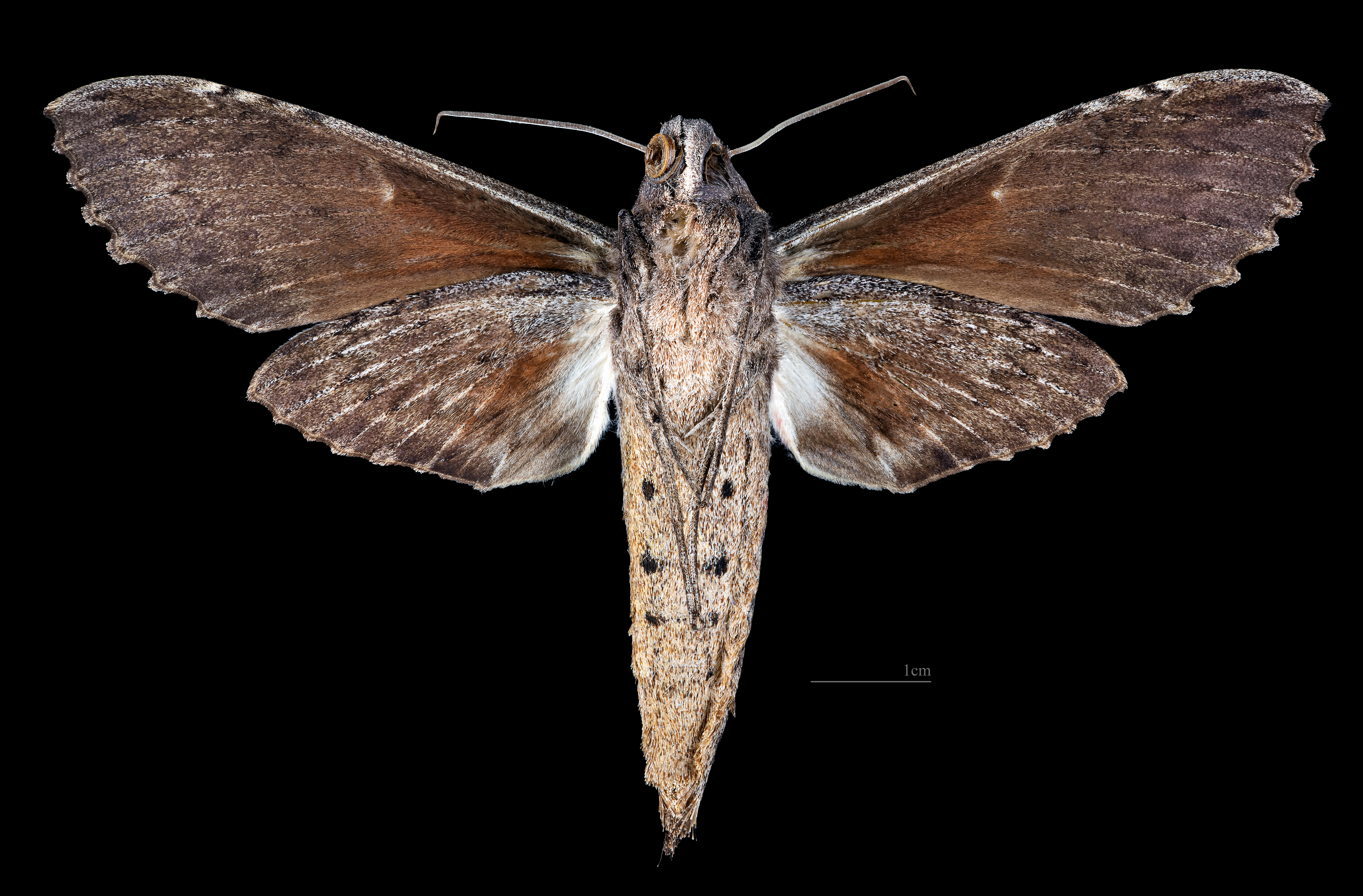
Female ventral
