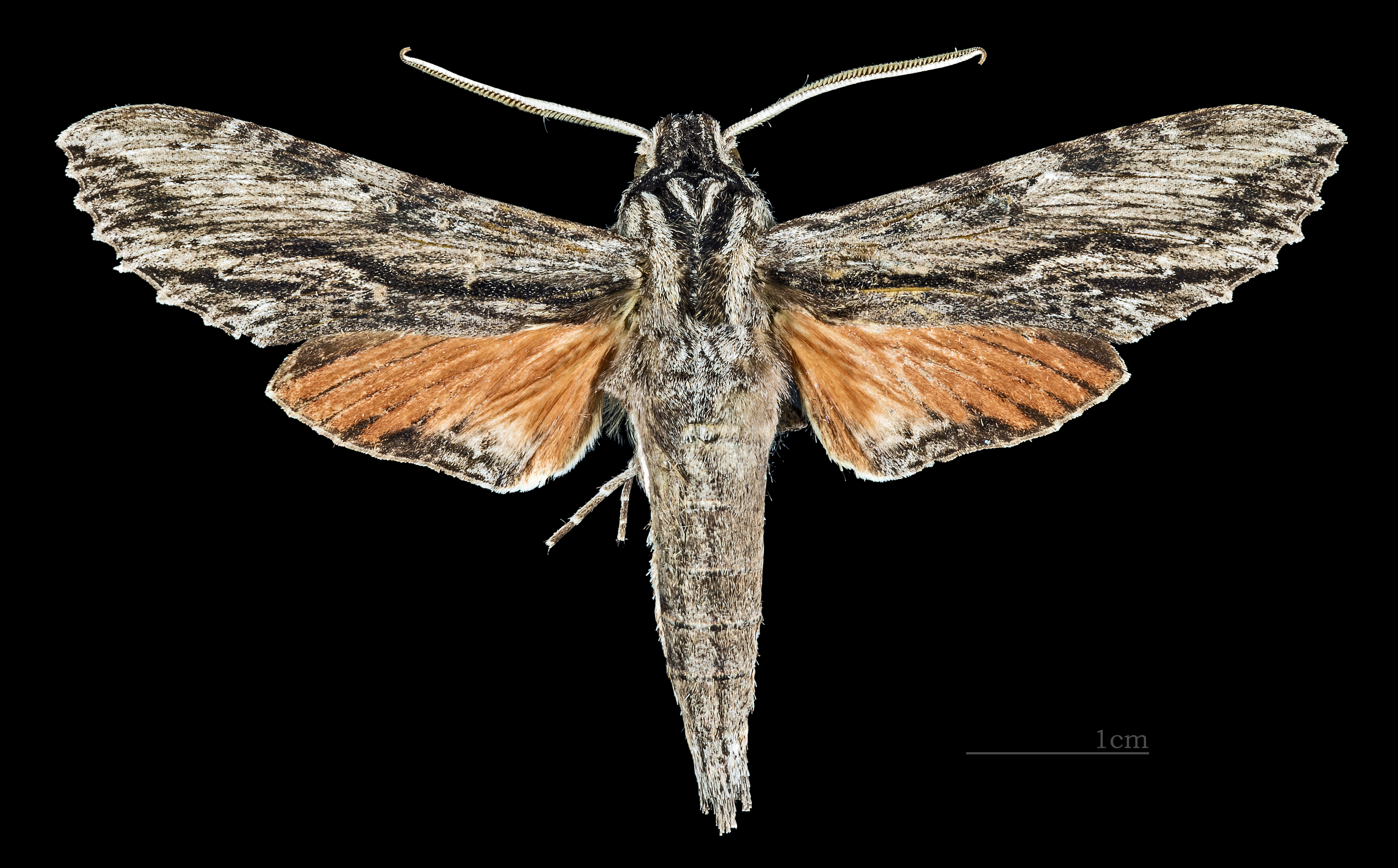
- Erinnyis obscura obscura ♂
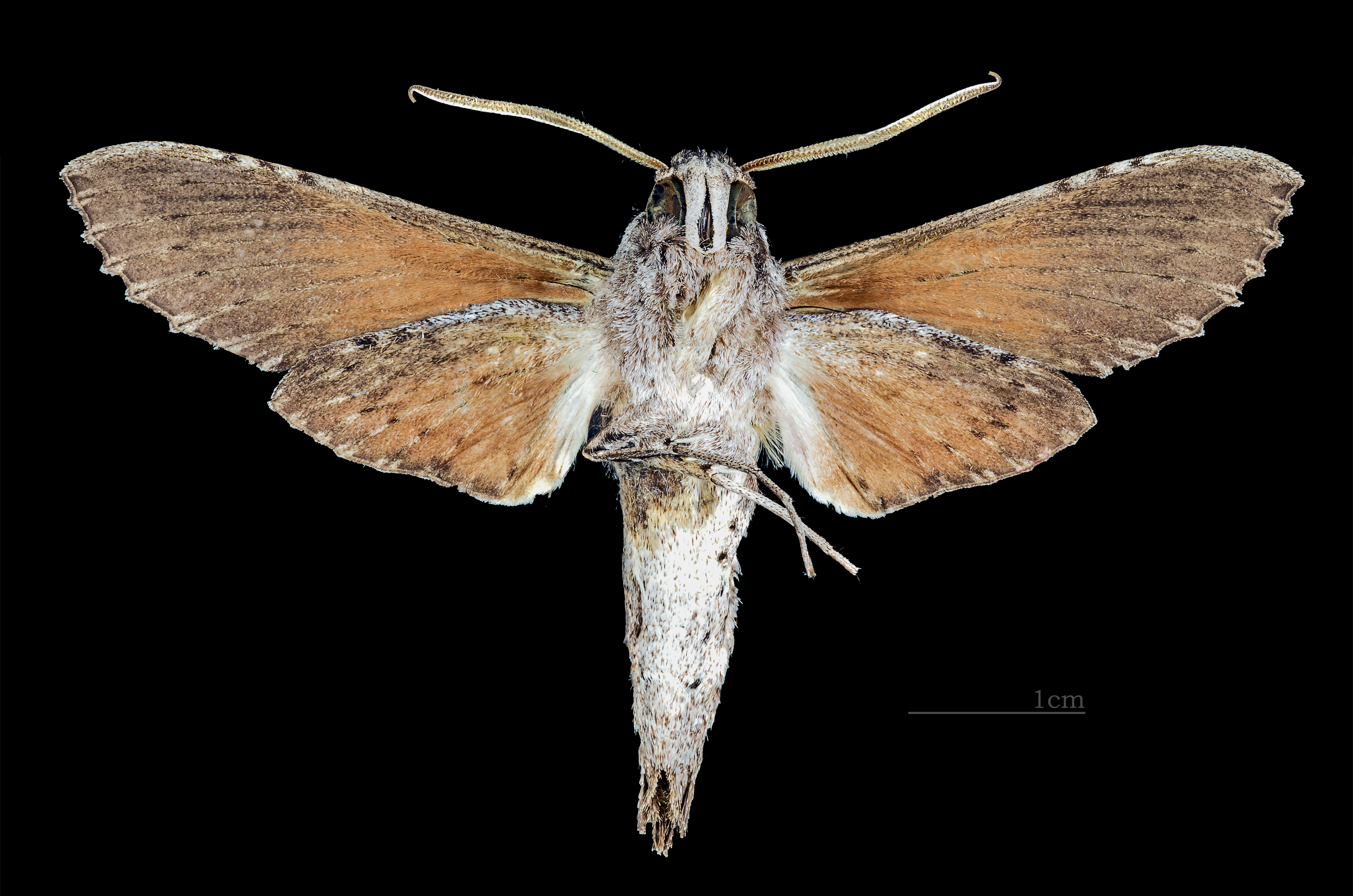
- Erinnyis obscura obscura ♂ △

Scientific classification
- Kingdom: Animalia
- Phylum: Arthropoda
- Clade: Pancrustacea
- Class: Insecta
- Order: Lepidoptera
- Family: Sphingidae
- Genus: Erinnyis
- Species: E. obscura

Binomial name
- Erinnyis obscura (Fabricius 1775)

Synonyms
- Sphinx obscura Fabricius, 1775; Sphinx picta Sepp, 1848; Sphinx rustica Schaller, 1788; Anceryx rhaebus Boisduval, 1870; Dilophonota festa Edwards, 1882; Erinnyis cinerosa Grote, 1865; Erinnyis domingonis (Butler, 1875); Erinnyis domingonis pallescens Clark, 1936; Erinnyis obscura jamaicensis Clark, 1935

= Erinnyis obscura =

Obscure sphinx

Species of moth

Erinnyis obscura, the obscure sphinx, is a moth of the family Sphingidae. The species was first described by Johann Christian Fabricius in 1775.

== Distribution ==
It lives from the northern part of South America up to the central United States.

== Description ==
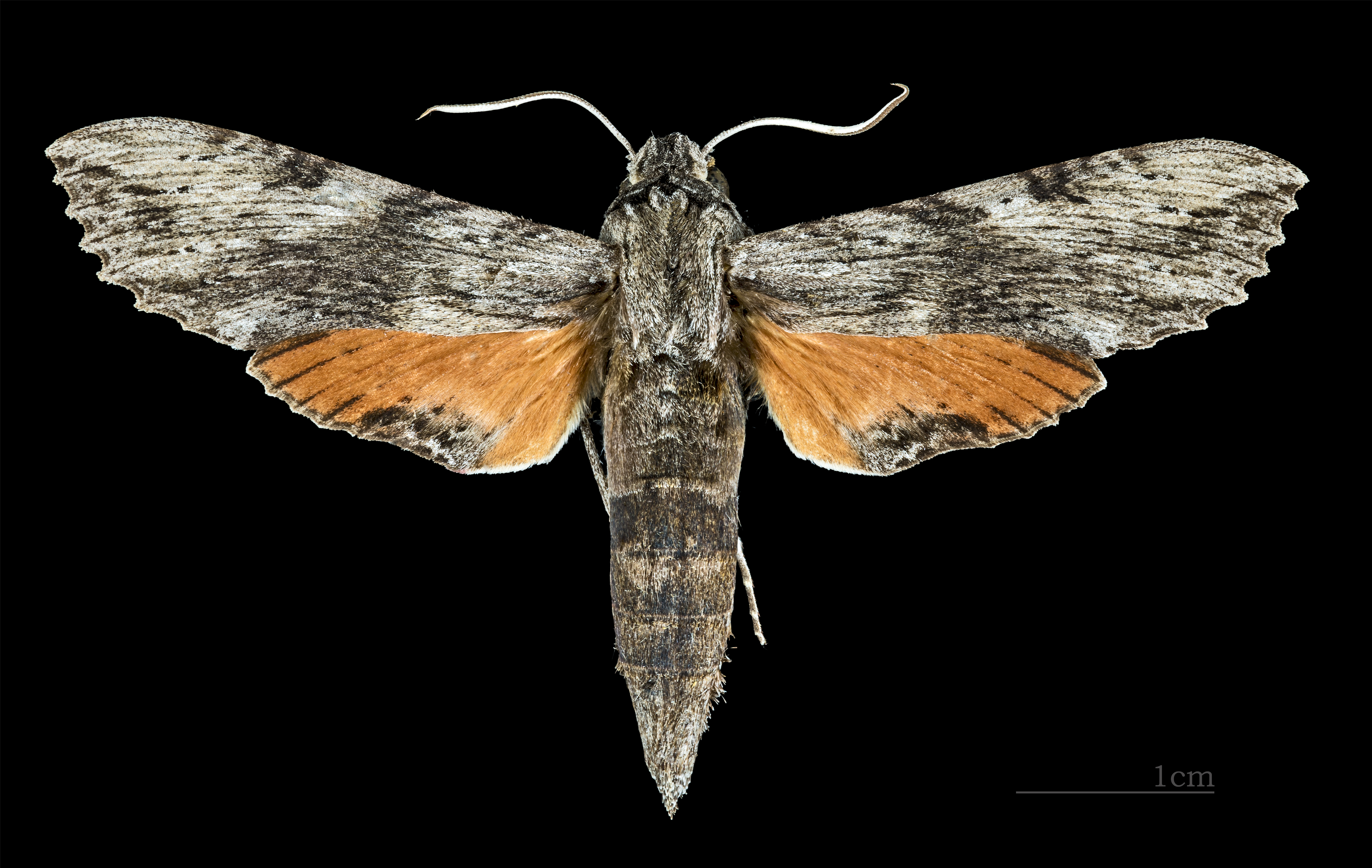
Erinnyis obscura obscura ♀

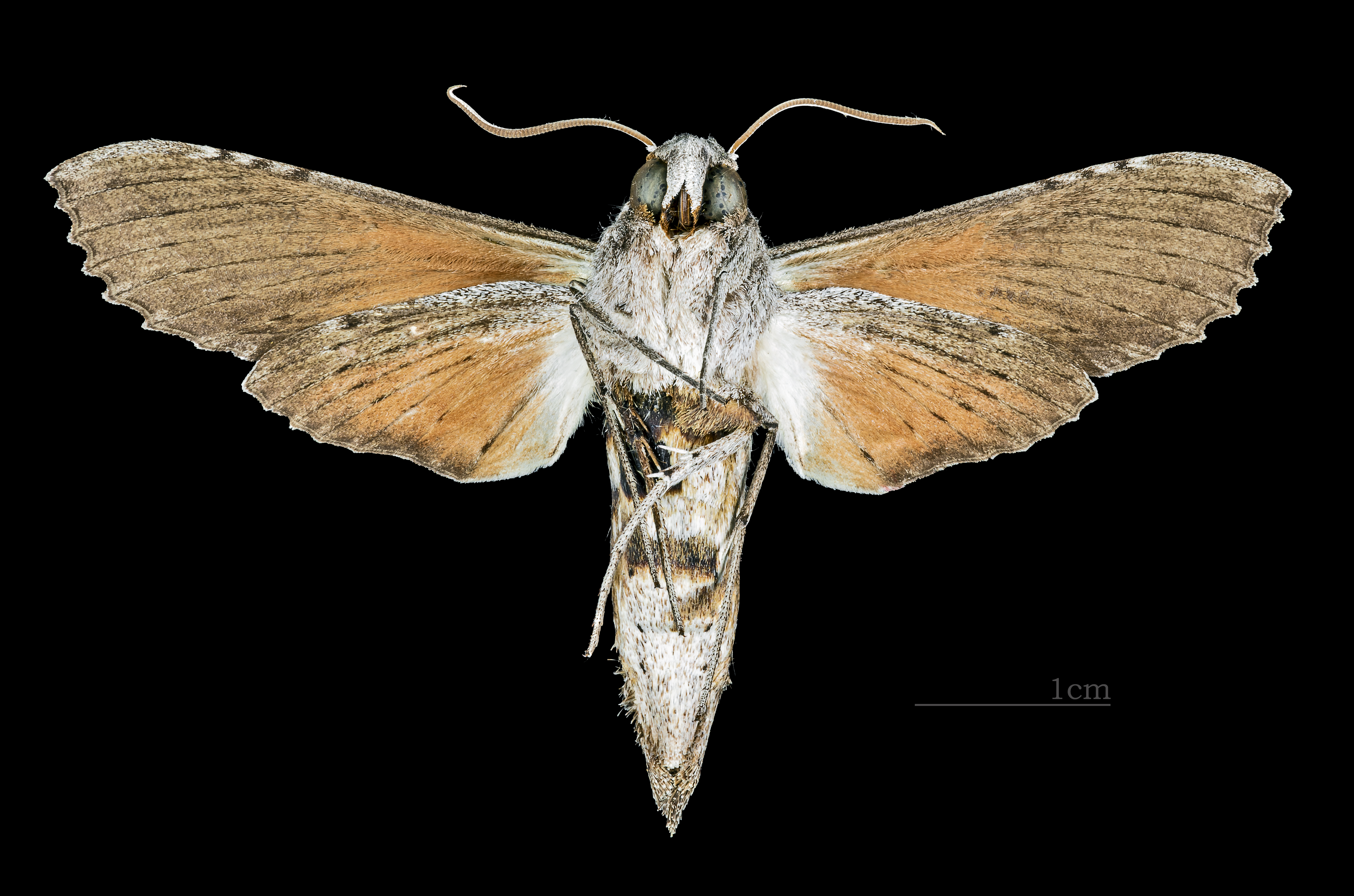
Erinnyis obscura obscura ♀ △

== Biology ==
Adults are on wing year round in the tropics, southern Florida and southern Texas. A single specimen has been added to the Cornell University Insect Collection after being collected by John Dombrowski in Ithaca New York, Tompkins County. The species was identified by curator Jason Dombroeski. This suggests that E. obscura's range is much more northern than expected. [see Cornell Insect Collection Data Base].

The caterpillars feed on various members of the family Apocynaceae, including Rauvolfia ligustrina, Rauvolfia tetraphylla, Stemmadenia obovata, Philibertia, Cynanchum and Carica papaya as well as Asclepiadaceae and spurge species, including Blepharodon mucronatum, Funastrum clausum and Morrenia odorata.

== Subspecies ==
- Erinnyis obscura obscura (tropical and subtropical lowlands from Uruguay west to Bolivia and Argentina and north through Central America, Mexico, and the West Indies to Florida, Mississippi, Texas, New Mexico, Arizona, and southern California. Strays recorded up to Arkansas, Oklahoma, Nebraska, North Dakota and Pennsylvania)
- Erinnyis obscura conformis Rothschild & Jordan, 1903 (Galapagos Islands)
- Erinnyis obscura socorroensis Clark, 1926 (Revillagigedo Islands)
Erinnyis obscura conformis ♂

Erinnyis obscura conformis ♂△

Erinnyis obscura conformis ♀

Erinnyis obscura conformis ♀ △
