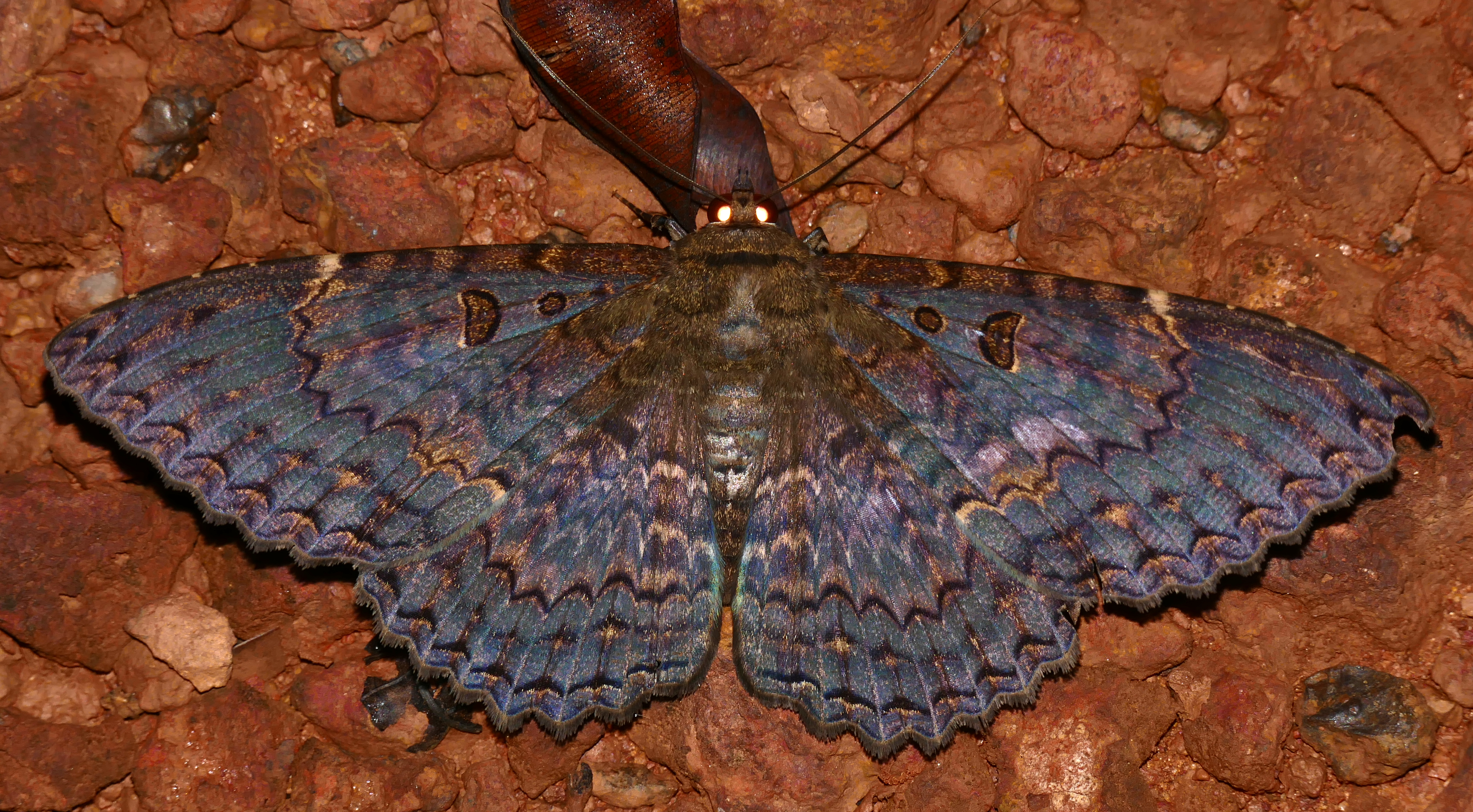
- Feigeria scops

Scientific classification
- Kingdom: Animalia
- Phylum: Arthropoda
- Clade: Pancrustacea
- Class: Insecta
- Order: Lepidoptera
- Superfamily: Noctuoidea
- Family: Erebidae
- Tribe: Thermesiini
- Genus: Feigeria; Berio, 1991

= Feigeria =

Genus of moths

Feigeria is a genus of moths of the family Erebidae. The genus was erected by Emilio Berio in 1991.

== Species ==
- Feigeria alauda (Guenée, 1852) - Brazil, Chile
- Feigeria arpi (Prout, 1921) - Brazil
- Feigeria buteo (Guenée, 1852) - Venezuela, Brazil
- Feigeria caligula (Maassen, 1890) - Ecuador
- Feigeria claricostata (Dognin, 1912) - Colombia, Peru
- Feigeria dichroa (Hampson, 1926) - Venezuela
- Feigeria feigei Berio, 1991 - ?
- Feigeria hercyna (Drury, 1775) - Jamaica
- Feigeria herilia (Stoll, 1780) - Suriname, Colombia
- Feigeria letiformis (Guenée, 1852) - Brazil, French Guiana
- Feigeria lignitis (Hampson, 1926) - Venezuela
- Feigeria maculicollis (Walker, 1858) - Venezuela
- Feigeria magna (Gmelin, 1790) - Panama, Venezuela, Suriname
- Feigeria melba (Felder & Rogenhofer, 1874) - Brazil, Peru, Suriname
- Feigeria mineis (Geyer, 1827) - Brazil
- Feigeria mycerina (Cramer, 1777) - Suriname, Haiti
- Feigeria nero (Feige, 1975) - Venezuela
- Feigeria orcynia (Druce, 1890) - Mexico, Panama
- Feigeria pinasi Zilli, 2003 - Ecuador
- Feigeria scops (Guenée, 1852) - Uruguay
- Feigeria scopsoides Berio, 1991 - ?
- Feigeria tiasa (Druce, 1890) - Costa Rica
- Feigeria vultura (Druce, 1890) - Belize, Guatemala, Panama
- [?] Feigeria xylia (Guenée, 1852) - USA (Texas), Mexico, Suriname. (Elsewhere as Letis xylia Guenée, 1852).
- Feigeria xylina Berio in Feige, 1991 - ?
