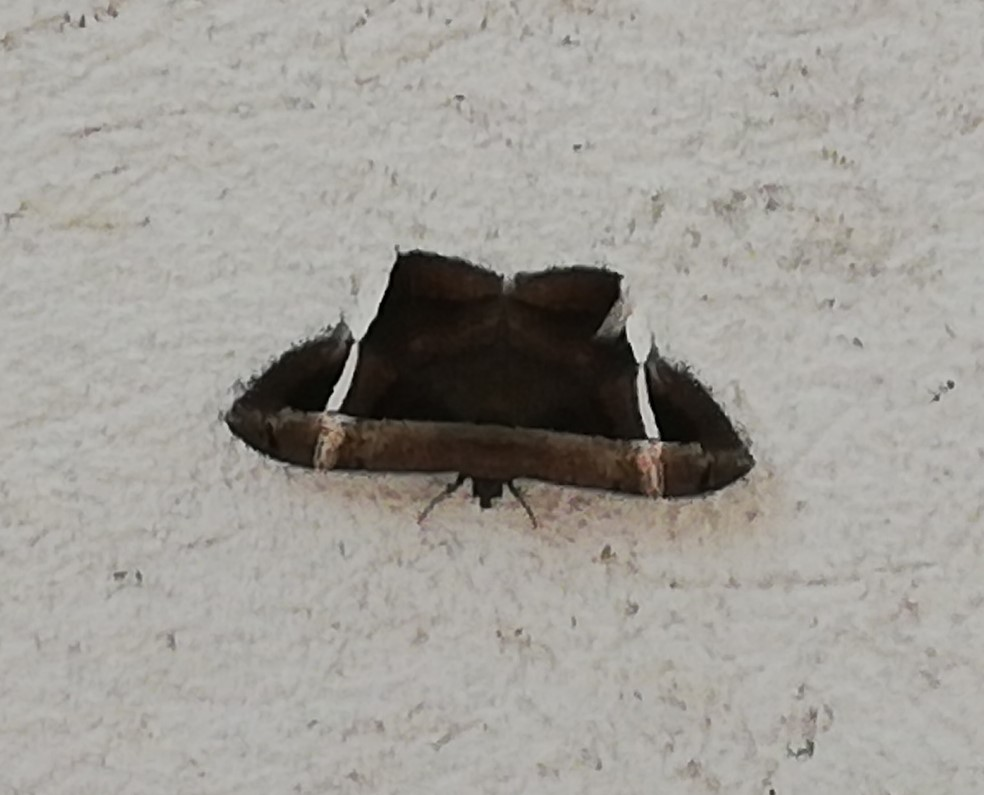

Scientific classification
- Kingdom: Animalia
- Phylum: Arthropoda
- Class: Insecta
- Order: Lepidoptera
- Superfamily: Noctuoidea
- Family: Erebidae
- Genus: Hemeroblemma
- Species: H. mexicana

Binomial name
- Hemeroblemma mexicana (Guenée, 1852)

Synonyms
- Peosina mexicana Guenee, 1852

= Hemeroblemma mexicana =

Species of moth

Hemeroblemma mexicana is a species of moth in the family Erebidae. The species is found in Mexico and Central America, including Honduras. A female was collected in Starr County, Texas, US, in 2012.

The larvae are injurious to the leaves of cacao in some years.
