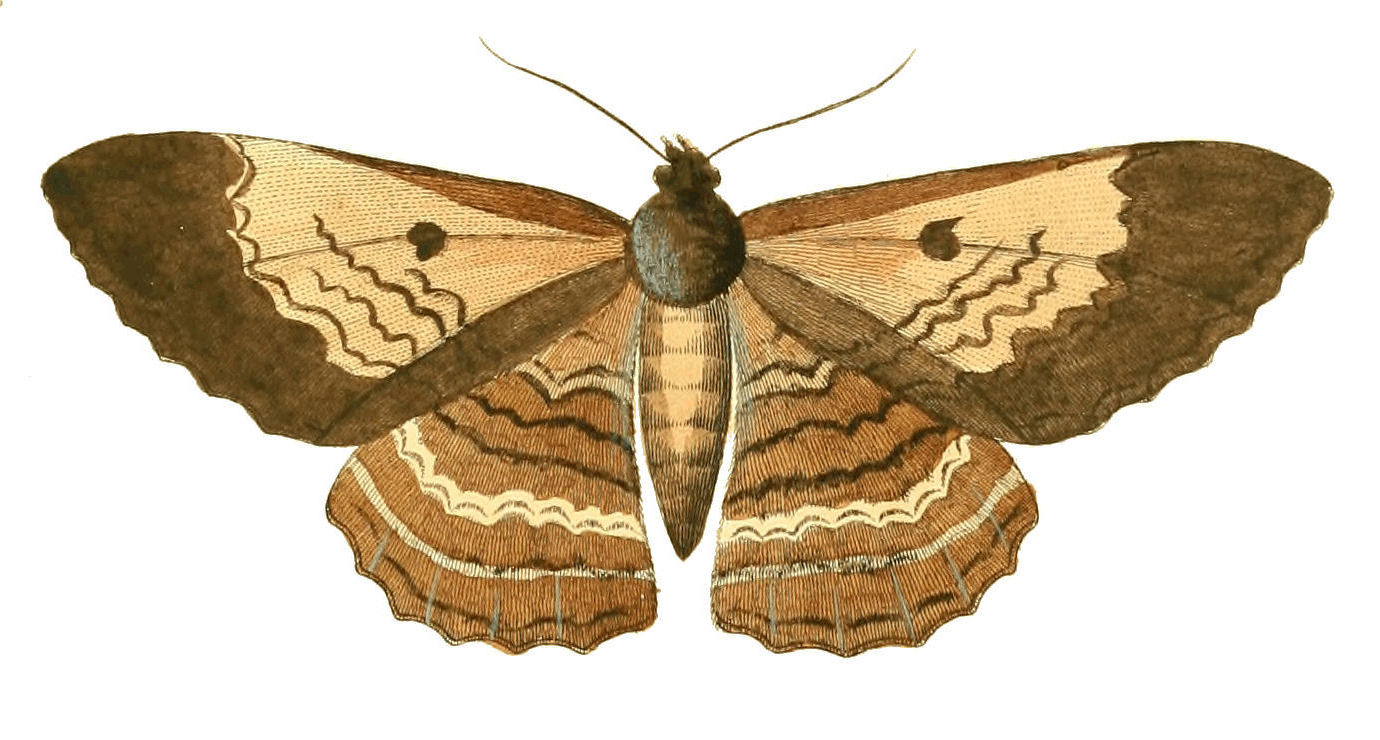
- Dorsal view
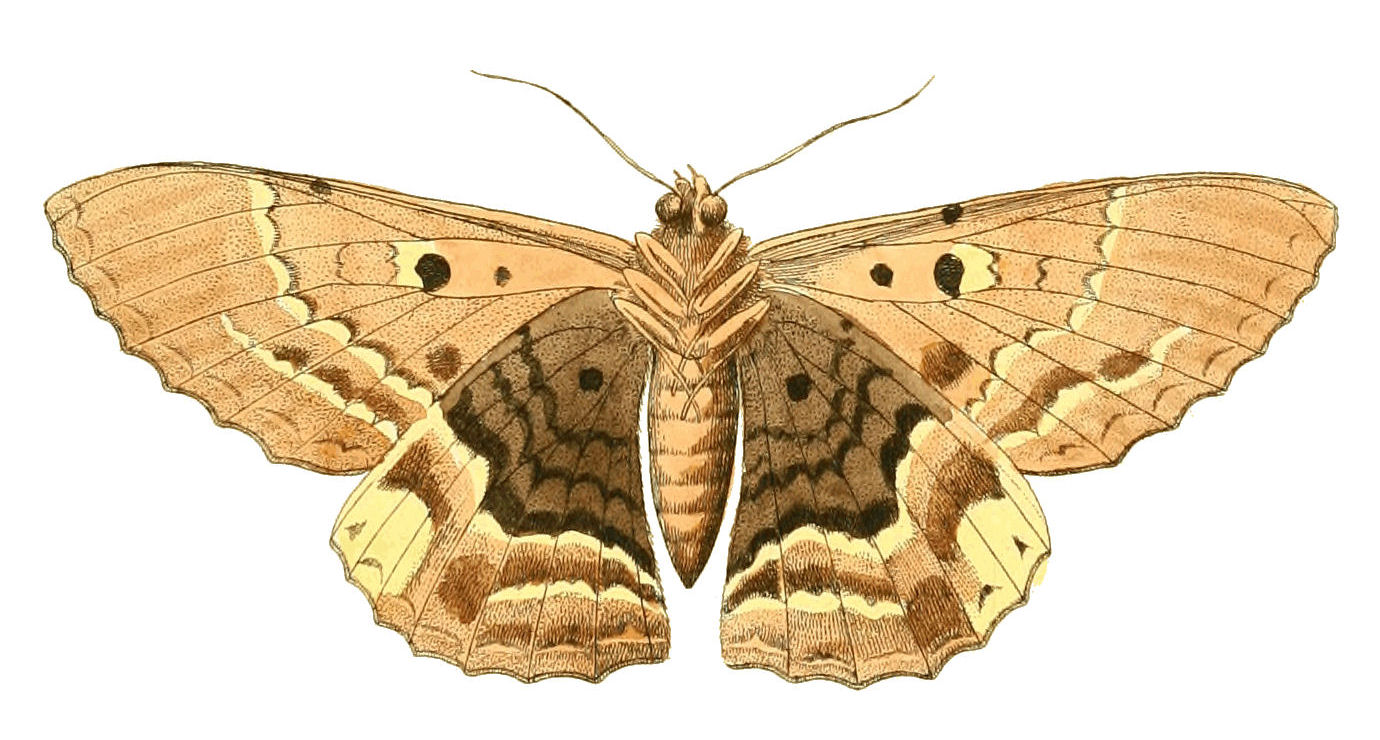
- Ventral view

Scientific classification
- Domain: Eukaryota
- Kingdom: Animalia
- Phylum: Arthropoda
- Class: Insecta
- Order: Lepidoptera
- Superfamily: Noctuoidea
- Family: Erebidae
- Genus: Letis
- Species: L. hercyna

Binomial name
- Letis hercyna (Drury, 1773)

Synonyms
- Phalaena hercyna Drury, 1773; Erebus hercyna (Drury, 1773)

= Letis hercyna =

Species of moth

Letis hercyna is a species of moth in the family Erebidae. It was first described by Dru Drury in 1773 from Jamaica.

== Description ==
Upper side: antennae filiform, brown, and thread-like. Head, thorax, abdomen, and wings greyish brown. The anterior wings having about two-thirds, next the shoulders, of a lighter brown, being separated from the darker part by a narrow, black, undulated line, similar to one which runs along the external edges from the tips to the lower corners; near the shoulders are placed two brown spots on each wing, one round, the other squarish. Posterior wings having two narrow, black, undulated lines crossing them, one next the external edges, the other about a quarter of an inch above them; the latter being edged with white.

Under side: palpi, breast, and sides greyish brown. Tongue spiral. Anterior wings rather lighter than on the upper side; having a dark undulated line crossing them, near the middle, from the anterior to the posterior edges; near the shoulders are two brown spots, one exactly like a comma, the other round and smaller; a white streak, edged at the top with brown, is placed near the lower corners; and along the external edges is a row of faint angulated brown spots placed over each scallop. Posterior wings greyish brown; having a small, square, brown spot near the shoulders, and a patch of a whitish colour at the upper corners. A dark brown undulated line, edged with white, begins near the middle of the anterior edges, which crossing the wings ends at the extremity of the body; and along the external edges runs a series of brown spots, placed over each scollop. All the wings are dentated. Wing-span nearly 4¼ inches (108 mm).
