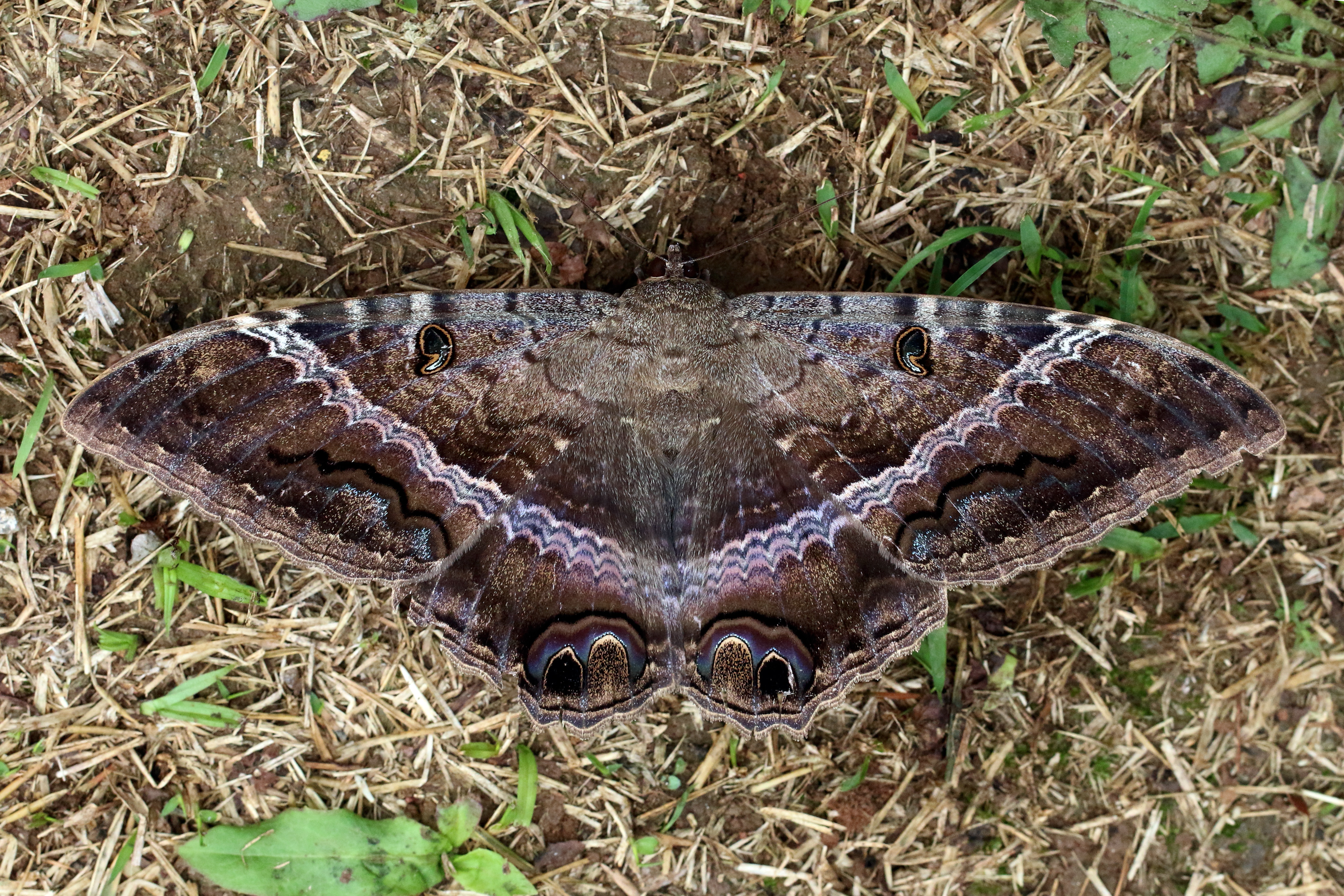
- Female in São Paulo, Brazil

Scientific classification
- Kingdom: Animalia
- Phylum: Arthropoda
- Clade: Pancrustacea
- Class: Insecta
- Order: Lepidoptera
- Superfamily: Noctuoidea
- Family: Erebidae
- Genus: Ascalapha
- Species: A. odorata

Binomial name
- Ascalapha odorata (Linnaeus, 1758)

Synonyms
- Erebus odora; Otosema odora; Phalaena Bombyx odorata Linnaeus, 1758; Phalaena Bombyx odora Linnaeus, 1764; Erebus agarista Cramer, 1779; Erebus marquesi Paulsen in Philippi, 1871

= Ascalapha odorata =

Black witch

Species of moth

The erebid moth Ascalapha odorata, commonly known as the black witch, is a large bat-shaped, dark-colored nocturnal moth, normally ranging from the southern United States to Brazil. Ascalapha odorata is also migratory into Canada and most states of the United States. It is the largest noctuoid in the continental United States. In the folklore of many Central and South American cultures, it is associated with death or misfortune.

== Physical description ==
Female moths can attain a wingspan of 24 cm. The dorsal surfaces of their wings are mottled brown with hints of iridescent purple and pink, and, in females, crossed by a white bar. The diagnostic marking is a small spot on each forewing shaped like a number nine or a comma. This spot is often green with orange highlights. Males are somewhat smaller, reaching 12 cm in width, darker in color and lacking the white bar crossing the wings. The larva is a large caterpillar up to 7 cm in length with intricate patterns of black and greenish-brown spots and stripes.

== Geographical range ==
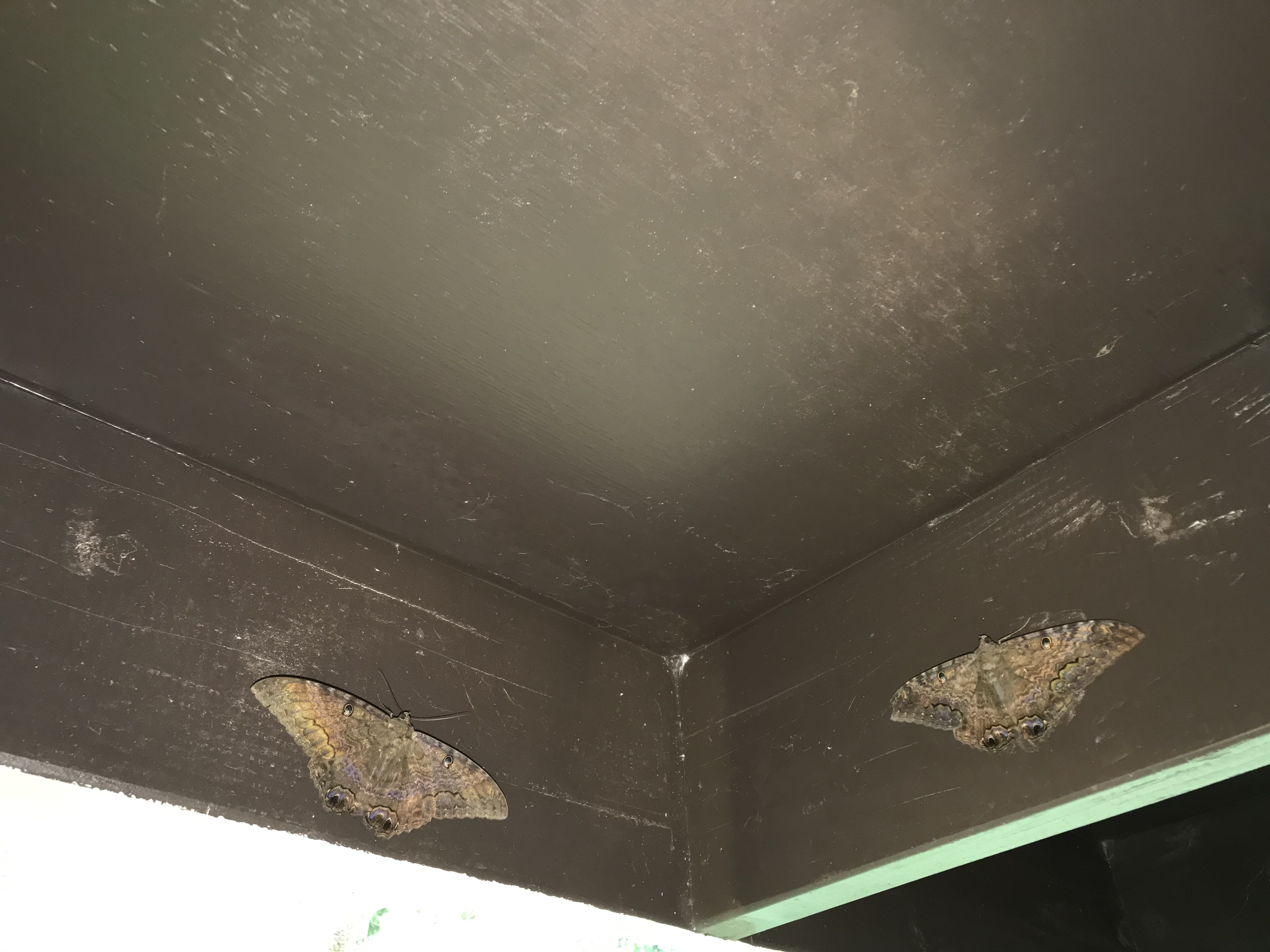
Black witch moths in Hawaii

The black witch lives from the southern United States, Mexico and Central America to Brazil, and even Argentina. Also, the moth has apparently been introduced to Hawaii.

The black witch flies north during late spring and summer. One was caught during an owl banding project at the Whitefish Point lighthouse on the shoreline of Lake Superior in July 2020.

== Host plants ==
Adults feed on overripe rainforest fruit, especially bananas, and larvae consume the leaves of plants. Most of its host plants are legumes. It favors Acacia species, Kentucky coffeetree (Gymnocladus dioicus), and candle bush (Senna alata). It attacks mesquite and ficus, and can be an agricultural pest.

== Folklore and mythology ==
The black witch is considered a harbinger of death in Mexican and Caribbean folklore. In many cultures, one of these moths flying into the house is considered bad luck: e.g., in Mexico, when there is sickness in a house and this moth enters, it is believed the sick person will die, though a variation on this theme (in the lower Rio Grande Valley, Texas) is that death only occurs if the moth flies in and visits all four corners of one's house (in Mesoamerica, from the pre-Hispanic era until the present time, moths have been associated with death and the number four). In some parts of Mexico, people joke that if one flies over someone's head, the person will lose their hair.

In Jamaica, under the name duppy bat, the black witch is seen as the embodiment of a lost soul or a soul not at rest. In Jamaican English, the word duppy is associated with malevolent spirits returning to inflict harm upon the living and bat refers to anything other than a bird that flies. The word "duppy" (also: "duppie") is also used in other West Indian countries, generally meaning "ghost".

In Brazil it is called "mariposa-bruxa", "mariposa-negra", "bruxa-negra", and "bruxa", and it is also believed that when a moth of this type enters the house it can bring some "bad omen", signaling the death of a resident. In the Ecuadorian highlands they are called Tandacuchi and in Peru Taparacuy or Taparaco. These countries share the belief that if this moth, a messenger of death, appears in your home, someone will die very soon.

In Hawaii, black witch mythology, though associated with death, has a happier note in that if a loved one has just died, the moth is an embodiment of the person's soul returning to say goodbye. In the Bahamas, where they are locally known as money moths or money bats, the legend is that if they land on you, you will come into money, and similarly, in South Texas, if a black witch lands above your door and stays there for a while, you will supposedly win the lottery.

In Paraguay and Argentina, this insect is mostly known as "ura", and there is a popular belief that this moth urinates and leaves worms on the skin of people and animals. However, the insect that lays eggs in the skin and whose larvae become embedded in the flesh is the colmoyote or screwworm (Dermatobia hominis).

In Spanish, the black witch is known as "mariposa de la muerte" (Mexico and Costa Rica), "pirpinto de la yeta" (Argentina), "tara bruja" (Venezuela) or simply "mariposa negra" (Colombia); in Nahuatl (Mexico) it is "Miquipapalotl" or "Tepanpapalotl" (miqui = death, black + papalotl = moth); in Quechua (Peru) it is "Taparaco"; in Mayan (Yucatán) it is "X-mahan-nah" (mahan = to borrow + nah = house). Other names for the moth include the papillion-devil, la sorcière noire, the mourning moth or the sorrow moth.

== In popular culture ==
Black witch moth pupae were placed in the mouths of victims of serial killer 'Buffalo Bill' in the novel The Silence of the Lambs. In the movie adaptation, they were replaced by death's-head hawkmoth pupae.

The Black Witch Moth is featured on an alternative cover of Kendrick Lamar's 2016 album, To Pimp a Butterfly.

== Related migratory moths ==
- Thysania agrippina – white witch
- Thysania zenobia – owl moth
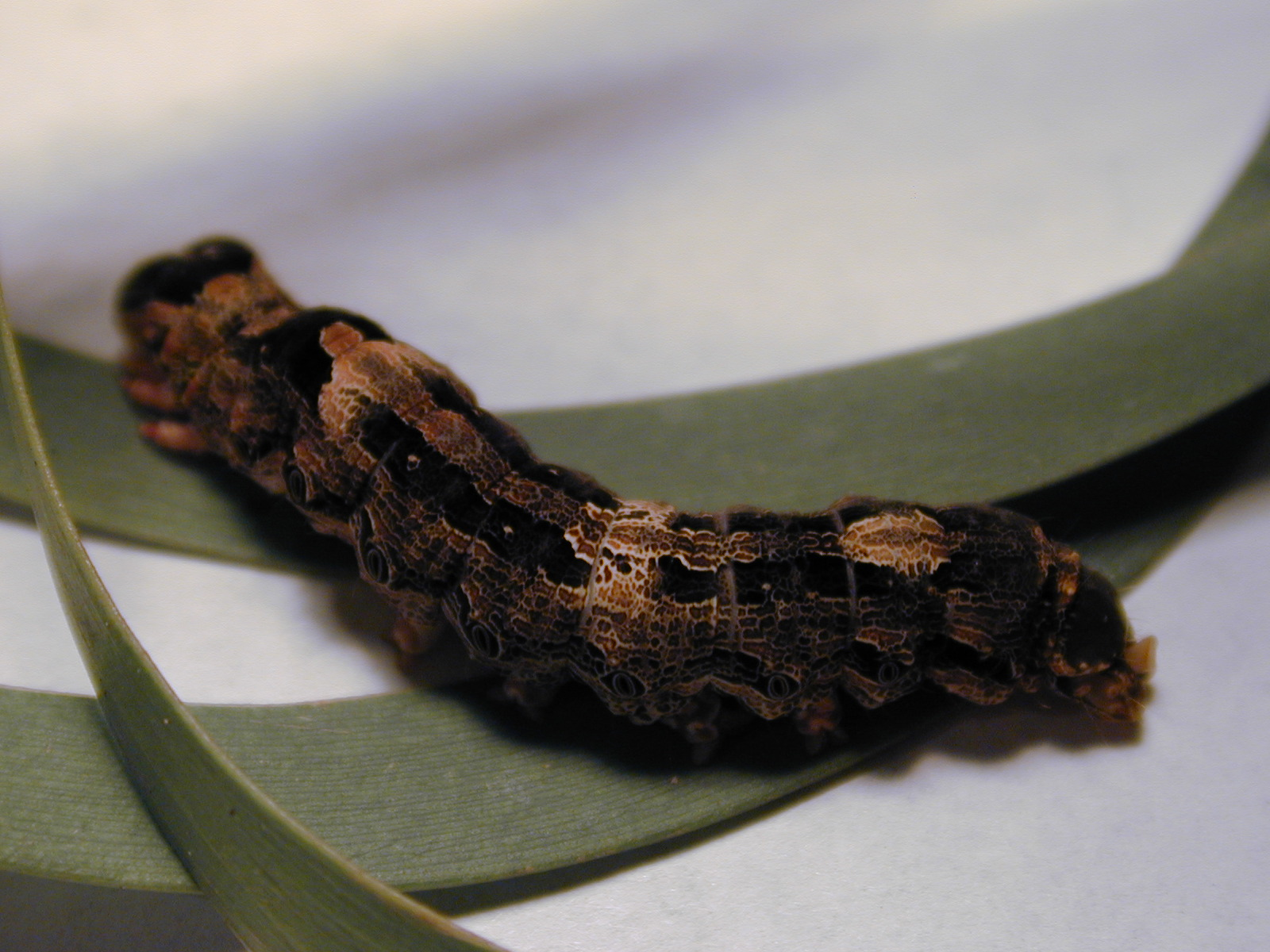
Larva

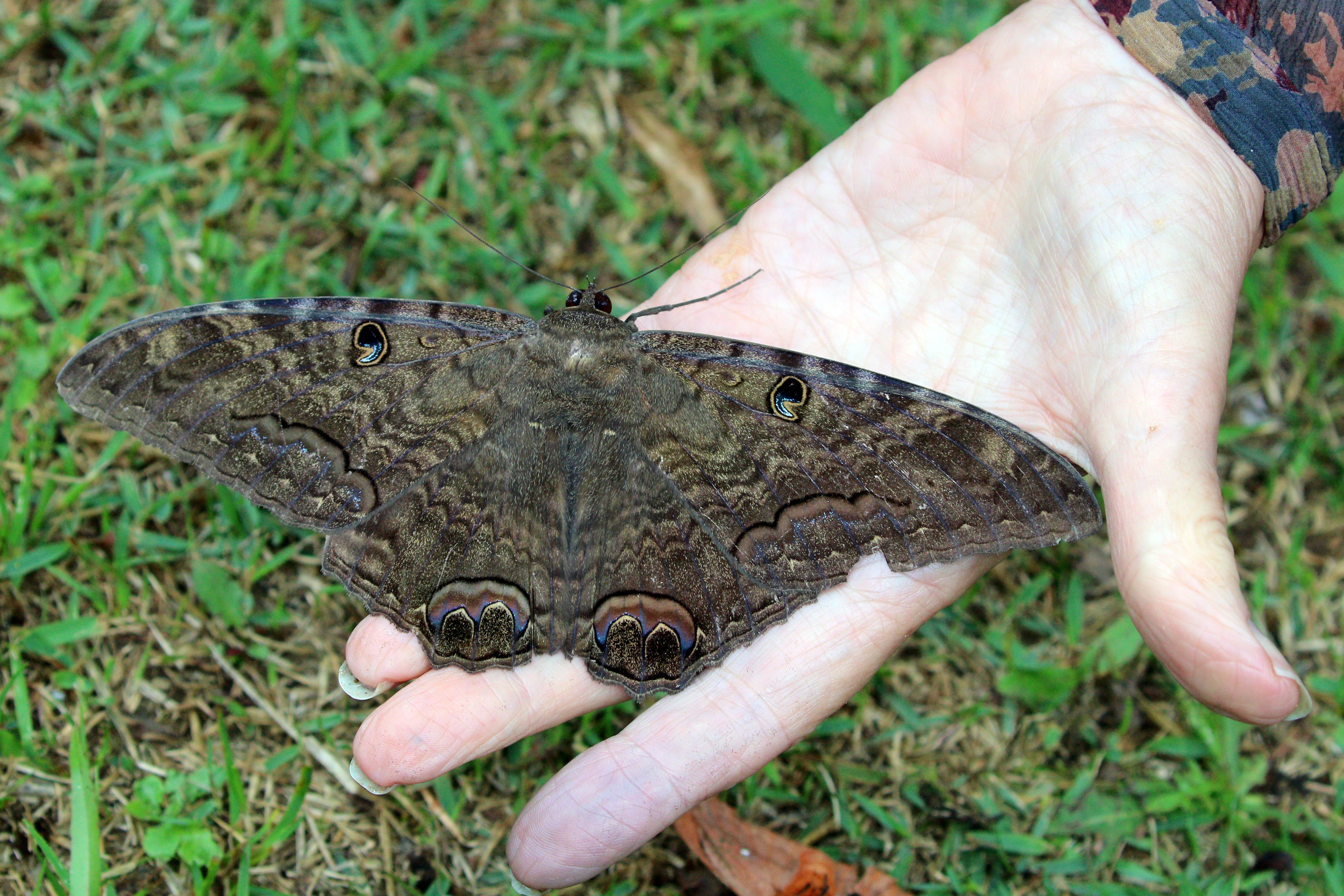
On an adult's hand
