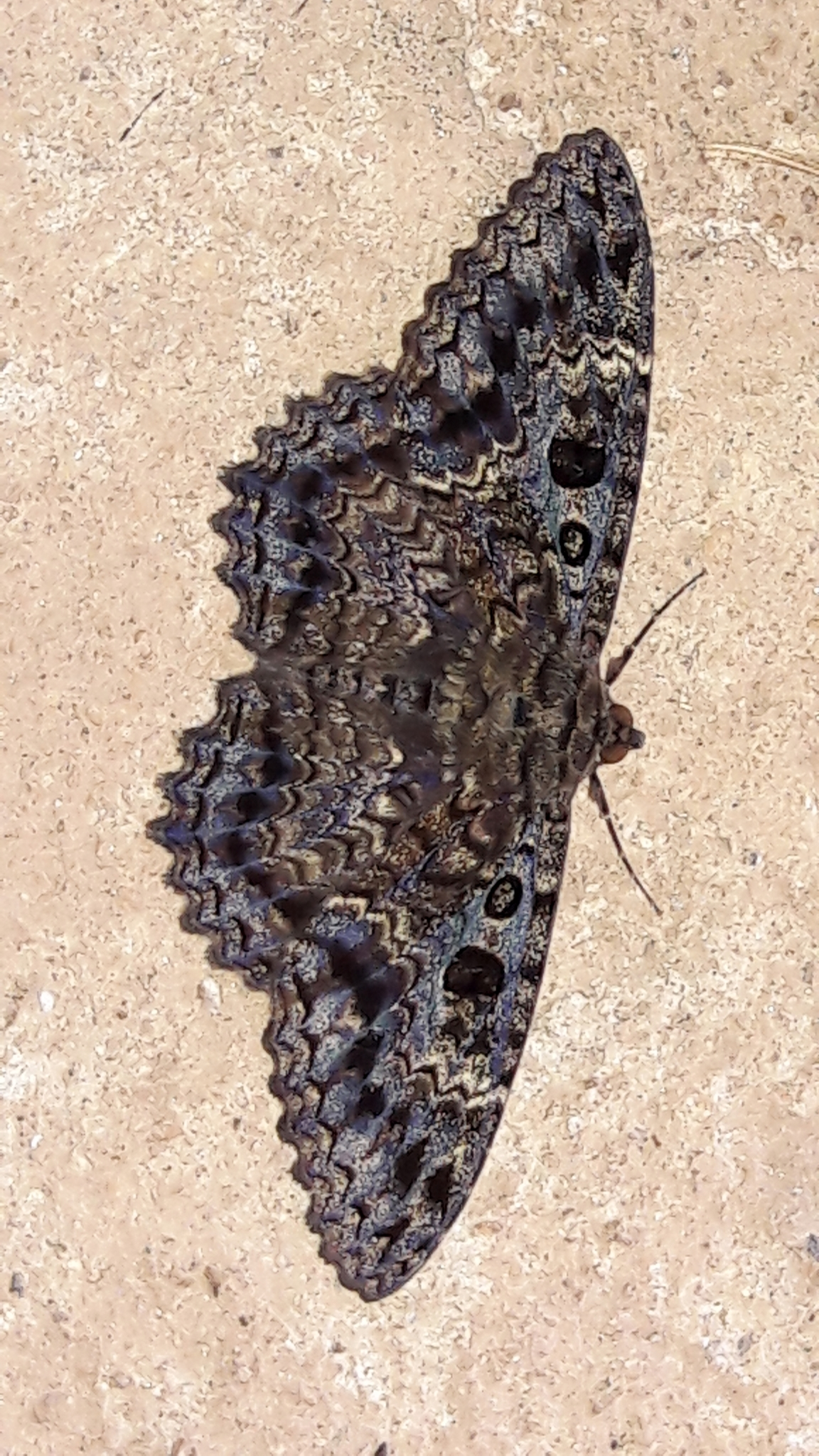

Scientific classification
- Domain: Eukaryota
- Kingdom: Animalia
- Phylum: Arthropoda
- Class: Insecta
- Order: Lepidoptera
- Superfamily: Noctuoidea
- Family: Erebidae
- Genus: Feigeria
- Species: F. scops

Binomial name
- Feigeria scops (Guénée, 1852)

= Feigeria scops =

Species of moth

Feigeria scops is a species of moth from the genus Feigeria. It is known from Trinidad.

Feigeria scops resembles Feigera alauda, but the latter has a smaller wing span and is less variable in appearance than F. scops.
