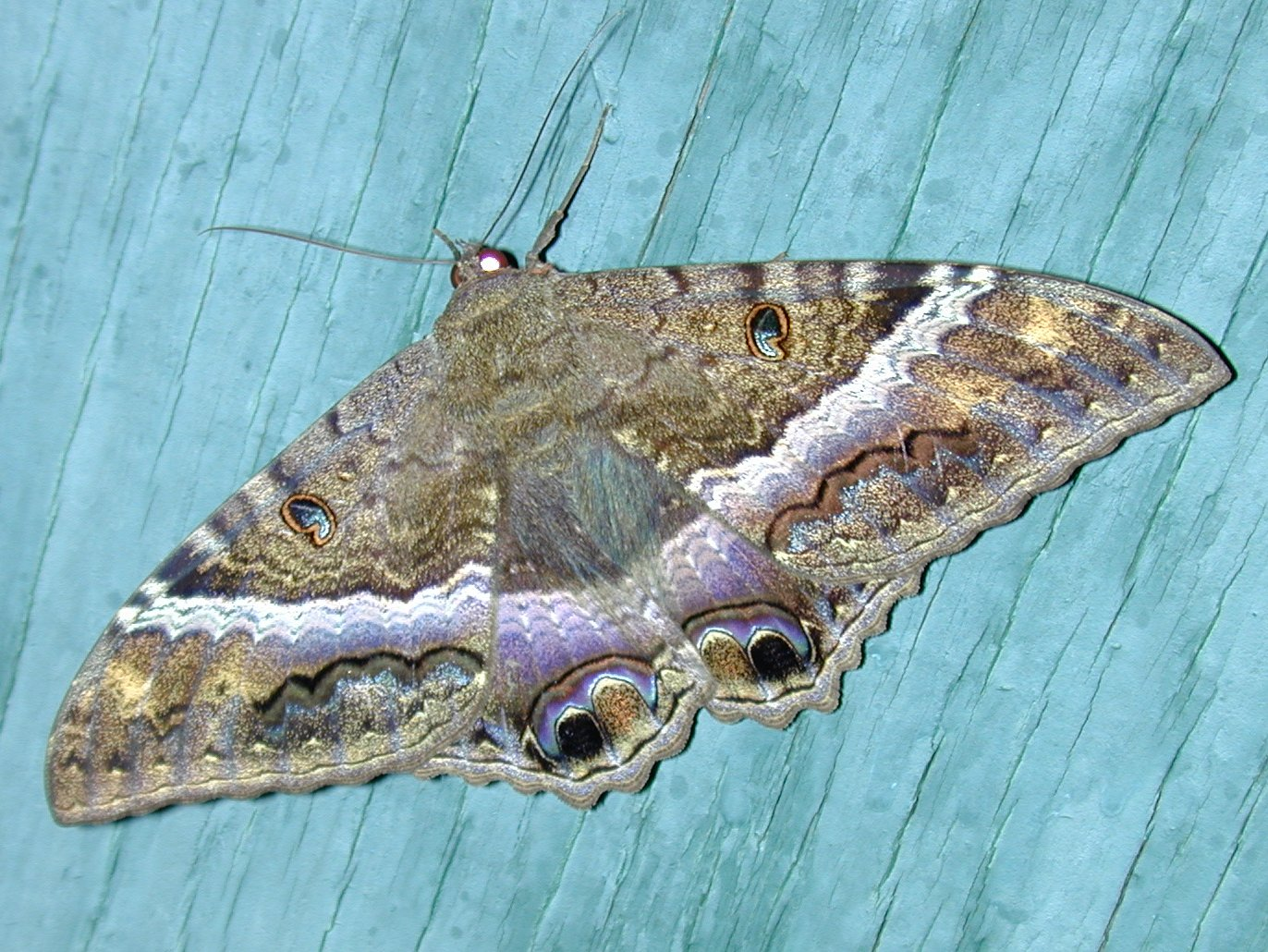
- Ascalapha odorata

Scientific classification
- Kingdom: Animalia
- Phylum: Arthropoda
- Clade: Pancrustacea
- Class: Insecta
- Order: Lepidoptera
- Superfamily: Noctuoidea
- Family: Erebidae
- Tribe: Thermesiini
- Genus: Ascalapha; Hübner, [1809]

Synonyms
- Idechthis Hubner, 1821; Otosema Hubner, 1823

= Ascalapha =

Genus of moths

Ascalapha is a genus of moths in the family Erebidae. The genus was erected by Jacob Hübner in 1809.

== Species ==
- Ascalapha odorata (Linnaeus, 1758) – black witch
