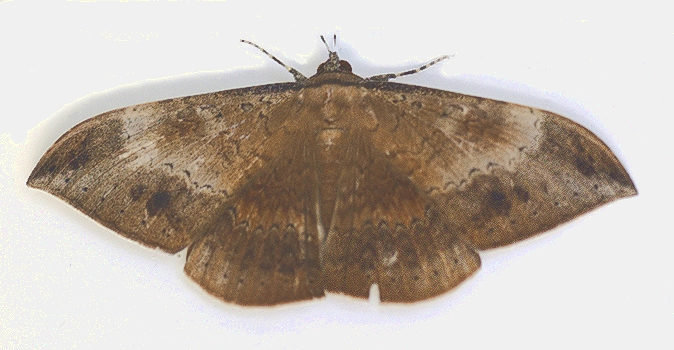
- Female Hemeroblemma opigena

Scientific classification
- Kingdom: Animalia
- Phylum: Arthropoda
- Clade: Pancrustacea
- Class: Insecta
- Order: Lepidoptera
- Superfamily: Noctuoidea
- Family: Erebidae
- Tribe: Thermesiini
- Genus: Hemeroblemma; Hübner, 1818

Synonyms
- Blosyris; Thermesia; Peosina; Brujas; Obucola; Brunjia

= Hemeroblemma =

Genus of moths

Hemeroblemma is a genus of moths in the family Erebidae. The genus was erected by Jacob Hübner in 1818.

== Species ==
- Hemeroblemma dolon (Cramer, 1777)
- Hemeroblemma dolosa (Walker, 1858)
- Hemeroblemma helima (Stoll [1782])
- Hemeroblemma intracta Hübner [1823]
- Hemeroblemma mexicana (Guenée, 1852)
- Hemeroblemma opigena Drury, 1773
