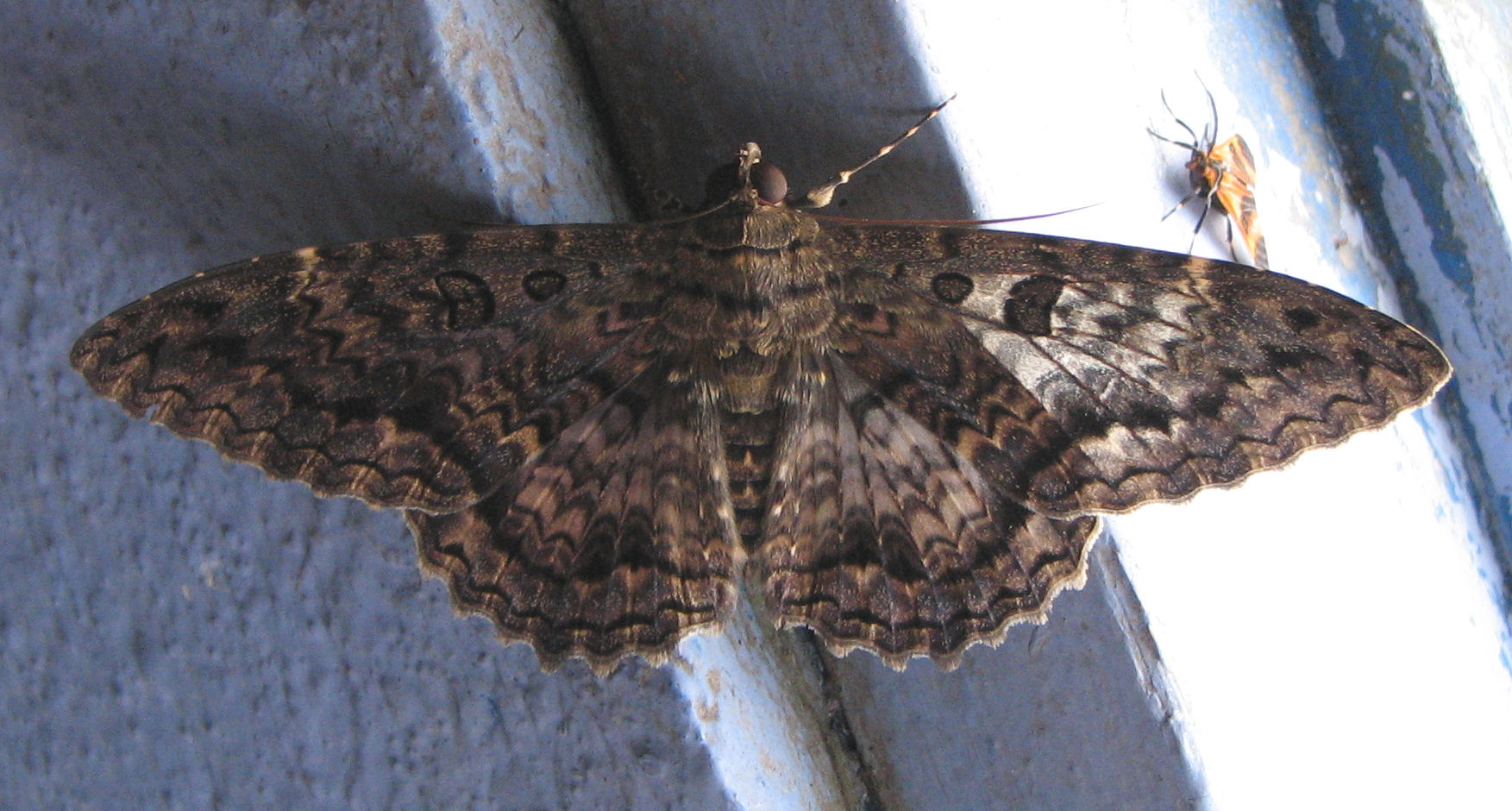
- Latebraria amphipyroides, Monteverde, Costa Rica

Scientific classification
- Kingdom: Animalia
- Phylum: Arthropoda
- Class: Insecta
- Order: Lepidoptera
- Superfamily: Noctuoidea
- Family: Erebidae
- Tribe: Thermesiini
- Genus: Latebraria; Guenée, 1852

= Latebraria =

Genus of moths

Latebraria is a genus of moths in the family Erebidae. The genus was erected by Achille Guenée in 1852. The moths are found in southern North and Central America.

== Species ==
- Latebraria amphipyroides Guenée, 1852
- Latebraria errans Walker, 1858
- Latebraria janthinula Guenée, 1852
