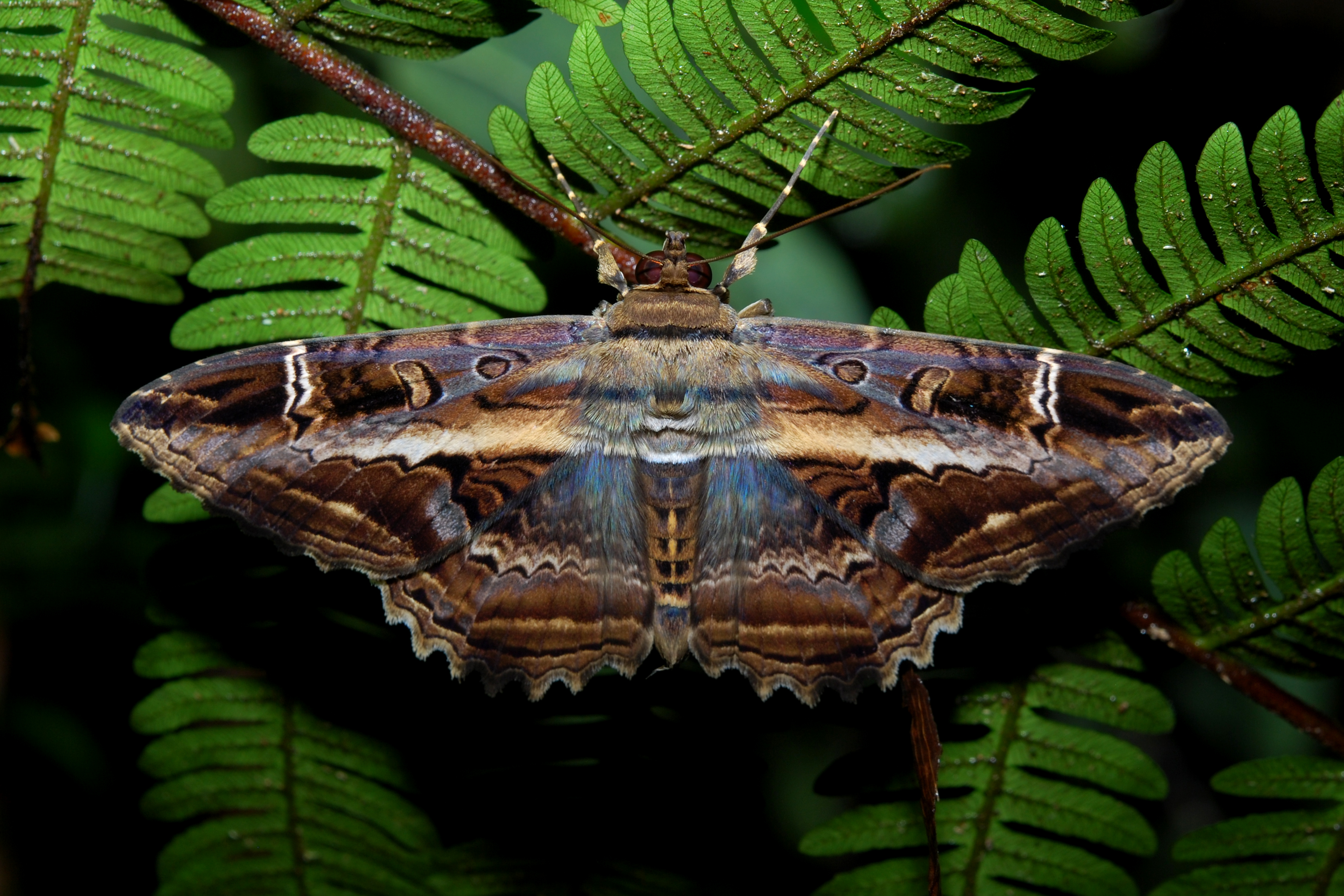
- Letis buteo

Scientific classification
- Kingdom: Animalia
- Phylum: Arthropoda
- Clade: Pancrustacea
- Class: Insecta
- Order: Lepidoptera
- Superfamily: Noctuoidea
- Family: Erebidae
- Tribe: Thermesiini
- Genus: Letis; Hübner, 1821

= Letis =

Genus of moths

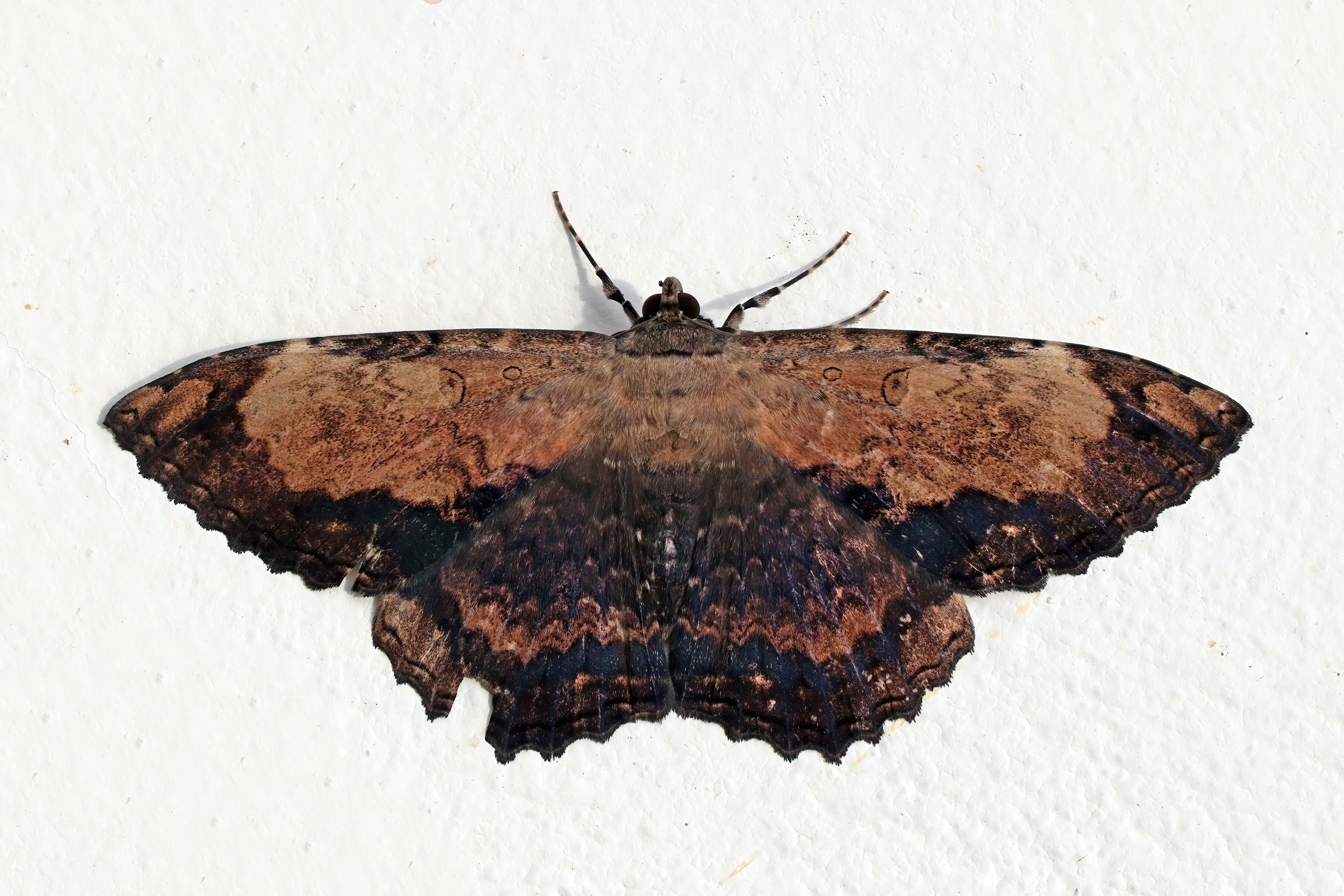
L. vultura, Panama

Letis is a genus of moths in the family Erebidae. The genus was erected by Jacob Hübner in 1821.

== Selected species ==
- Letis hercyna (Drury, 1773)
- Letis magna Gmelin, 1789
- Letis orcynia Druce, 1890 – marbled witch
- Letis scops Guenée, 1852 – scops witch moth
- Letis specularis Hübner, 1821 (type species)
- Letis xylia Guenée, 1852
