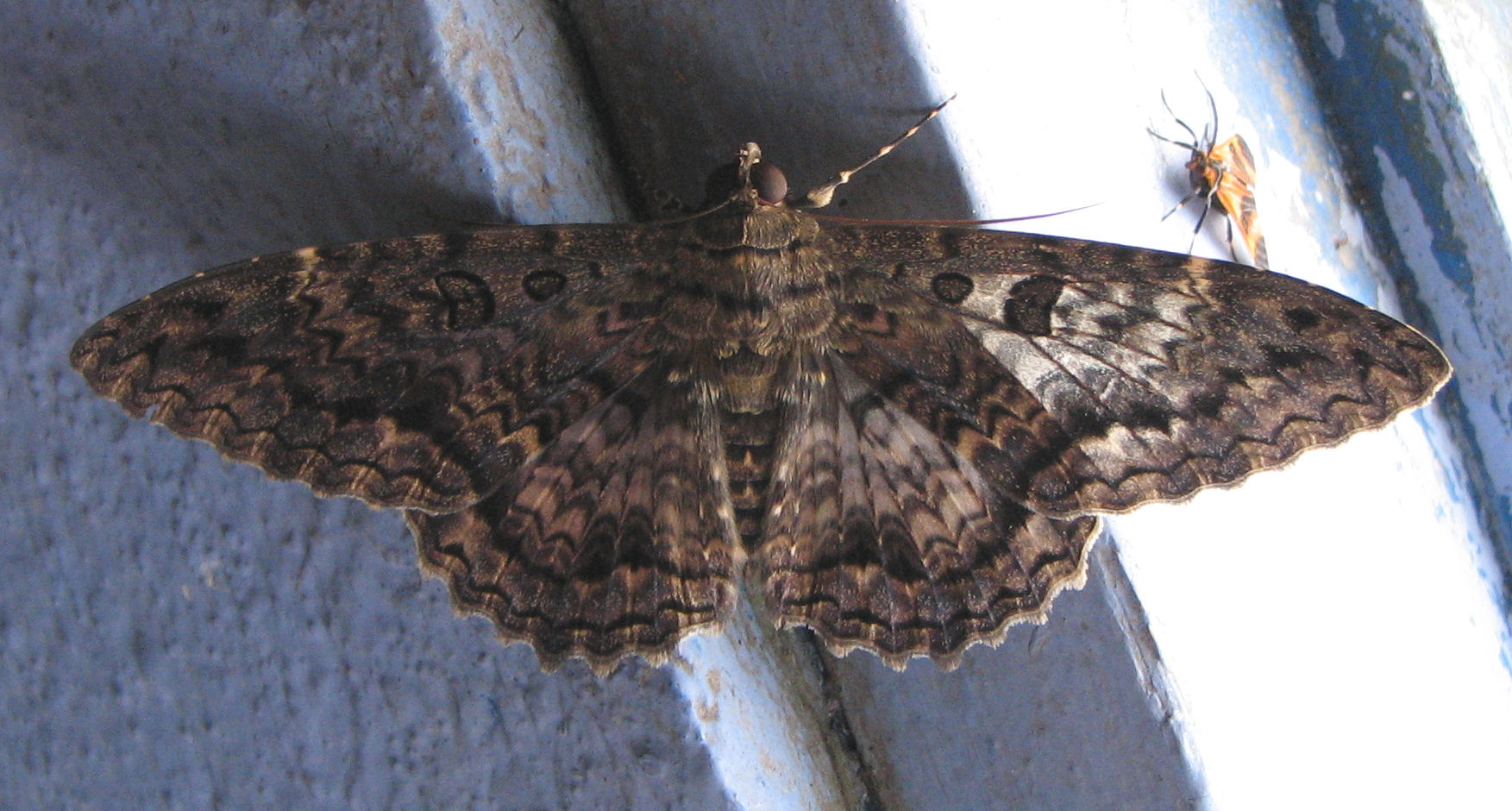
- In Monteverde, Costa Rica

Scientific classification
- Kingdom: Animalia
- Phylum: Arthropoda
- Class: Insecta
- Order: Lepidoptera
- Superfamily: Noctuoidea
- Family: Erebidae
- Genus: Latebraria
- Species: L. amphipyroides

Binomial name
- Latebraria amphipyroides Guenée, 1852

= Latebraria amphipyroides =

Species of moth

Latebraria amphipyroides is a species of moth in the family Erebidae. The species is found in southern North America and Central America, south at least to Cuba and Costa Rica.
