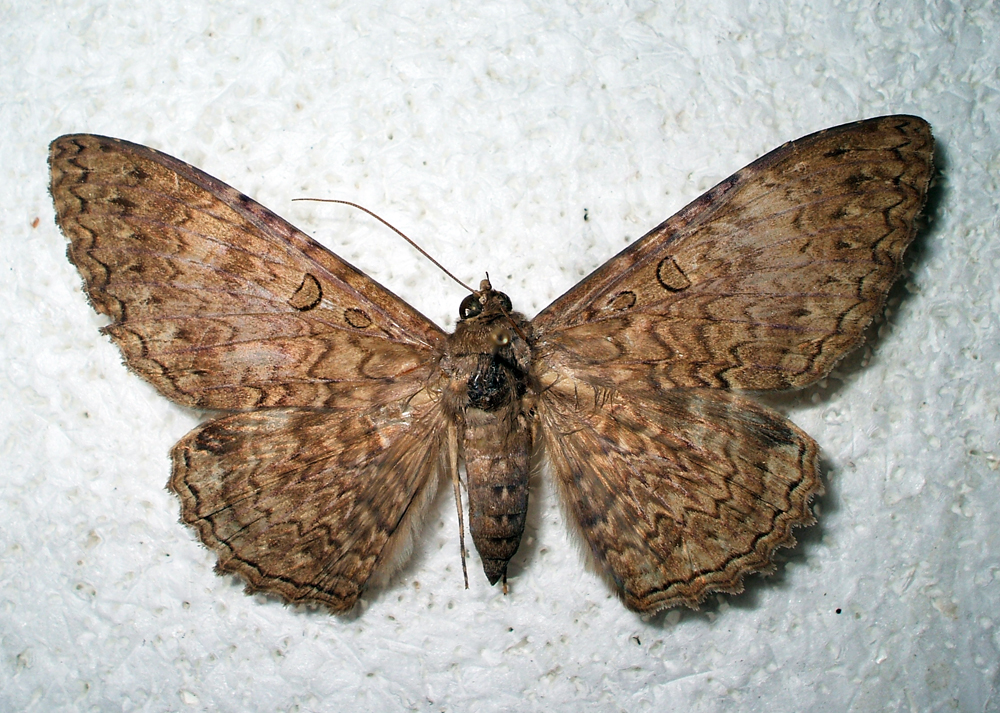

Scientific classification
- Kingdom: Animalia
- Phylum: Arthropoda
- Class: Insecta
- Order: Lepidoptera
- Superfamily: Noctuoidea
- Family: Erebidae
- Tribe: Thermesiini
- Genus: Letis
- Species: L. xylia

Binomial name
- Letis xylia Guenée, 1852

= Letis xylia =

Species of moth

Letis xylia is a species of moth in the family Erebidae first described by Achille Guenée in 1852. It is found in North America.

The MONA or Hodges number for Letis xylia is 8646.1.
