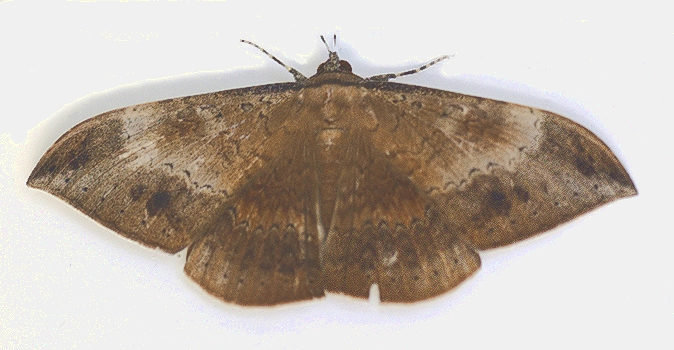
- Female

Scientific classification
- Domain: Eukaryota
- Kingdom: Animalia
- Phylum: Arthropoda
- Class: Insecta
- Order: Lepidoptera
- Superfamily: Noctuoidea
- Family: Erebidae
- Genus: Hemeroblemma
- Species: H. opigena

Binomial name
- Hemeroblemma opigena Drury, 1773

Synonyms
- Hemeroblemma pandrosa; Hemeroblemma repellens; Hemeroblemma respiciens

= Hemeroblemma opigena =

Species of moth

Hemeroblemma opigena is a species of moth in the family Erebidae first described by Dru Drury in 1773. The species is found from Florida to Brazil.

The wingspan is about 80 mm for the females. In Florida, adults are on wing in March.
