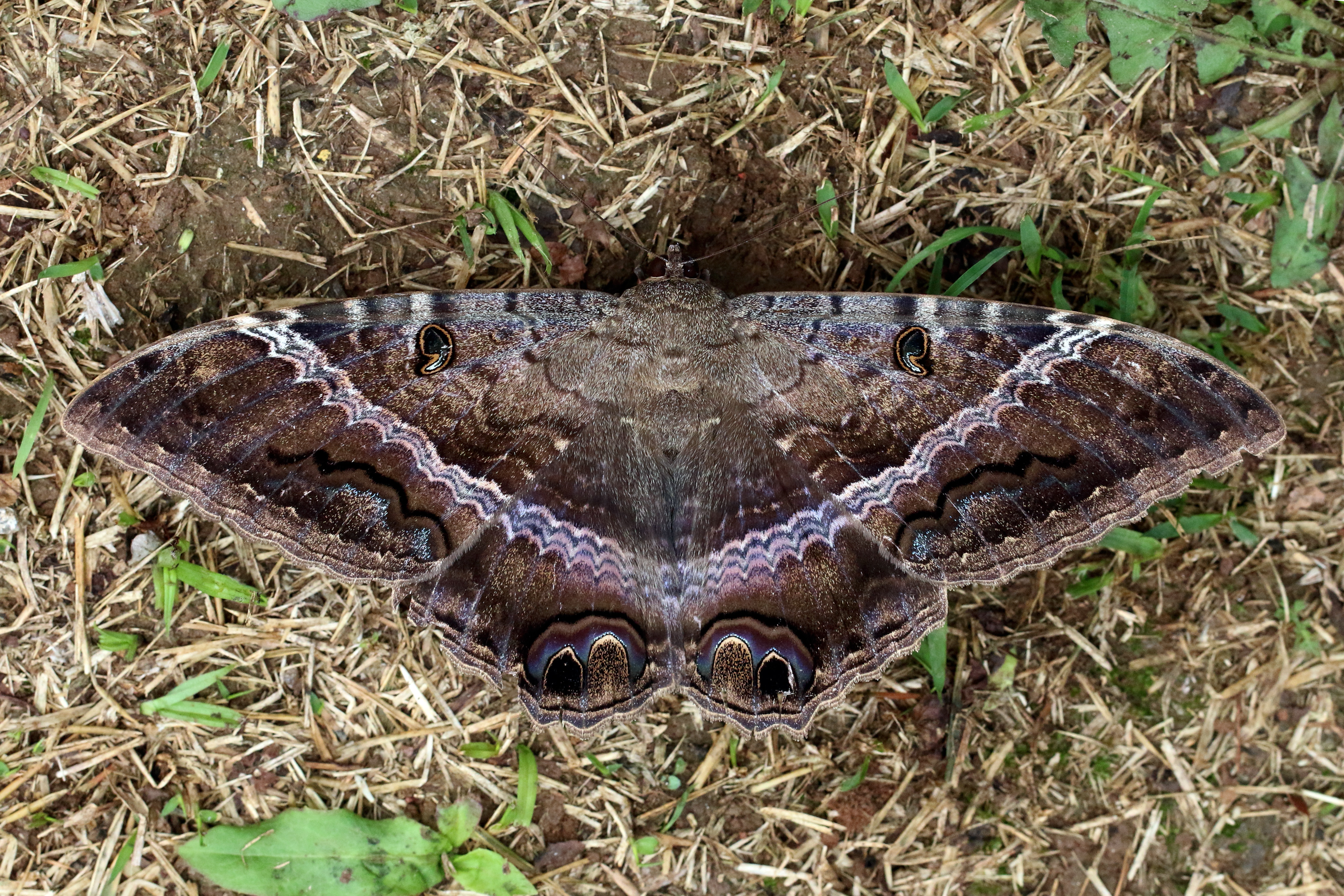
- Ascalapha odorata

Scientific classification
- Kingdom: Animalia
- Phylum: Arthropoda
- Class: Insecta
- Order: Lepidoptera
- Superfamily: Noctuoidea
- Family: Erebidae
- Subfamily: Erebinae
- Tribe: Thermesiini; Guenée, 1852

= Thermesiini =

Tribe of moths

The Thermesiini are a tribe of moths in the family Erebidae.

== Genera ==
- Ascalapha
- Feigeria
- Hemeroblemma
- Latebraria
- Letis
- Thysania
