= Pococera albimedialis =

Scientific classification
- Kingdom: Animalia
- Phylum: Arthropoda
- Class: Insecta
- Order: Lepidoptera
- Family: Pyralidae
- Genus: Jocara
- Species: J. albimedialis

Binomial name
- Jocara albimedialis (Hampson, 1906)

Synonyms
- Pococera albimedialis Hampson, 1906; Pococera albimedium Schaus, 1912

Species of moth

Jocara albimedialis is a species of snout moth. It is found in Mexico and Costa Rica.

== Taxonomy ==
The name albimedialis is preoccupied by Jocara albimedialis.
