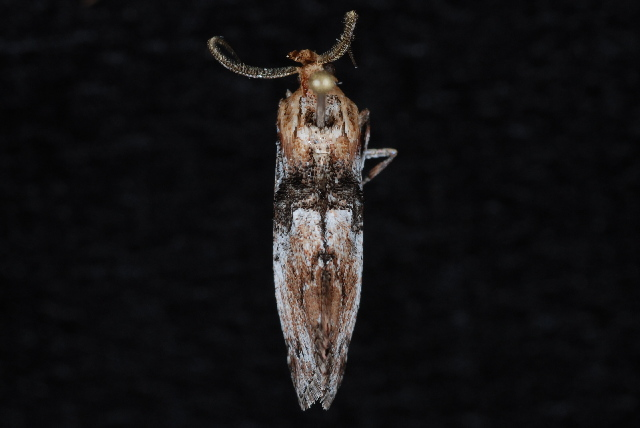

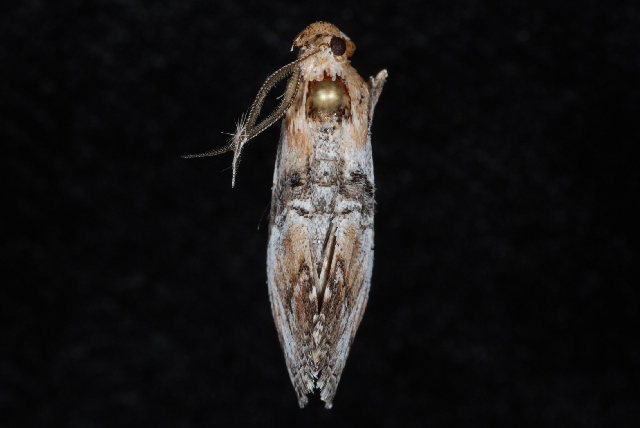

Scientific classification
- Domain: Eukaryota
- Kingdom: Animalia
- Phylum: Arthropoda
- Class: Insecta
- Order: Lepidoptera
- Family: Pyralidae
- Genus: Toripalpus
- Species: T. trabalis

Binomial name
- Toripalpus trabalis Grote, 1881

Synonyms
- Jocara trabalis; Toripalpus adulatalis Hulst, 1887

= Toripalpus trabalis =

Species of moth

Toripalpus trabalis is a species of snout moth in the genus Toripalpus. It was first described by Augustus Radcliffe Grote in 1881. It is found in North America, including Alabama, Arizona, British Columbia, California, Colorado, Nevada, New Mexico, Texas and Washington.

The larvae have been recorded on Abies balsamea.

== Taxonomic history ==
For a time, genus Toripalpus was deemed a synonym of Jocara, and the species was (alongside Toripalpus breviornatalis) included in genus Jocara in the 1983 Hodges checklist. In 1993, the original genus was revived by M. Alma Solis, with both J. breviornatalis and J. trabalis transferred back to Toripalpus.
