= Jocara pagiroa =

Scientific classification
- Domain: Eukaryota
- Kingdom: Animalia
- Phylum: Arthropoda
- Class: Insecta
- Order: Lepidoptera
- Family: Pyralidae
- Genus: Jocara
- Species: J. pagiroa

Binomial name
- Jocara pagiroa (Schaus, 1906)

Synonyms
- Deuterollyta pagiroa Schaus, 1906

Species of moth

Jocara pagiroa is a species of snout moth in the genus Jocara. It is found in Brazil.
