= Jocara fuscifusalis =

Scientific classification
- Kingdom: Animalia
- Phylum: Arthropoda
- Class: Insecta
- Order: Lepidoptera
- Family: Pyralidae
- Genus: Jocara
- Species: J. fuscifusalis

Binomial name
- Jocara fuscifusalis (Hampson, 1916)

Synonyms
- Pococera fuscifusalis Hampson, 1916; Deuterollyta fuscifusalis

Species of moth

Jocara fuscifusalis is a species of snout moth in the genus Jocara. It is found in South America.
