= Jocara nigrisquama =

Scientific classification
- Domain: Eukaryota
- Kingdom: Animalia
- Phylum: Arthropoda
- Class: Insecta
- Order: Lepidoptera
- Family: Pyralidae
- Genus: Jocara
- Species: J. nigrisquama

Binomial name
- Jocara nigrisquama (Dognin, 1904)

Synonyms
- Stericta nigrisquama Dognin, 1904

Species of moth

Jocara nigrisquama is a species of snout moth. It is found in Argentina. It was first described by Paul Dognin in 1904.
