= Jocara francesca =

Scientific classification
- Domain: Eukaryota
- Kingdom: Animalia
- Phylum: Arthropoda
- Class: Insecta
- Order: Lepidoptera
- Family: Pyralidae
- Genus: Jocara
- Species: J. francesca

Binomial name
- Jocara francesca (E. D. Jones, 1912)

Synonyms
- Deuterollyta francesca E. D. Jones, 1912; Tioga egvina Schaus, 1922

Species of moth

Jocara francesca is a species of snout moth in the genus Jocara. The species was first described by E. Dukinfield Jones in 1912. It is found in French Guiana and Brazil.
