= Jocara venezuelensis =

Scientific classification
- Domain: Eukaryota
- Kingdom: Animalia
- Phylum: Arthropoda
- Class: Insecta
- Order: Lepidoptera
- Family: Pyralidae
- Genus: Jocara
- Species: J. venezuelensis

Binomial name
- Jocara venezuelensis Amsel, 1956

Species of moth

Jocara venezuelensis is a species of snout moth. It is found in Venezuela.
