= Jocara anastasia =

Scientific classification
- Domain: Eukaryota
- Kingdom: Animalia
- Phylum: Arthropoda
- Class: Insecta
- Order: Lepidoptera
- Family: Pyralidae
- Genus: Jocara
- Species: J. anastasia

Binomial name
- Jocara anastasia Schaus, 1922

Synonyms
- Deuterollyta anastasia

Species of moth

Jocara anastasia is a species of snout moth in the genus Jocara. It is found in Guatemala.
