= Jocara conspicualis =

Scientific classification
- Domain: Eukaryota
- Kingdom: Animalia
- Phylum: Arthropoda
- Class: Insecta
- Order: Lepidoptera
- Family: Pyralidae
- Genus: Jocara
- Species: J. conspicualis

Binomial name
- Jocara conspicualis (Lederer, 1863)

Synonyms
- Stericta conspicualis Lederer, 1863; Deuterollyta conspicualis; Stericta medusa Druce, 1902

Species of moth

Jocara conspicualis is a species of snout moth in the genus Jocara. It was described by Julius Lederer in 1863, and is known from Brazil and Colombia.
