= Jocara nana =

Scientific classification
- Domain: Eukaryota
- Kingdom: Animalia
- Phylum: Arthropoda
- Class: Insecta
- Order: Lepidoptera
- Family: Pyralidae
- Genus: Jocara
- Species: J. nana

Binomial name
- Jocara nana Schaus, 1912

Species of moth

Jocara nana is a species of snout moth. It is found in Costa Rica.
