= Jocara olivescens =

Scientific classification
- Domain: Eukaryota
- Kingdom: Animalia
- Phylum: Arthropoda
- Class: Insecta
- Order: Lepidoptera
- Family: Pyralidae
- Genus: Jocara
- Species: J. olivescens

Binomial name
- Jocara olivescens (H. Druce, 1902)

Synonyms
- Stericta olivescens H. Druce, 1902; Jocara albulatalis Dognin, 1904

Species of moth

Jocara olivescens is a species of snout moth first described by Herbert Druce in 1902. It is found in South America, including Colombia.
