= Jocara claudalis =

Scientific classification
- Domain: Eukaryota
- Kingdom: Animalia
- Phylum: Arthropoda
- Class: Insecta
- Order: Lepidoptera
- Family: Pyralidae
- Genus: Jocara
- Species: J. claudalis

Binomial name
- Jocara claudalis Möschler, 1886

Synonyms
- Deuterollyta claudalis

Species of moth

Jocara claudalis is a species of snout moth in the genus Jocara. It is found on Jamaica.
