= Jocara cristalis =

Scientific classification
- Domain: Eukaryota
- Kingdom: Animalia
- Phylum: Arthropoda
- Class: Insecta
- Order: Lepidoptera
- Family: Pyralidae
- Genus: Jocara
- Species: J. cristalis

Binomial name
- Jocara cristalis (C. Felder, R. Felder & Rogenhofer, 1875)

Synonyms
- Deuterollyta cristalis C. Felder, R. Felder & Rogenhofer, 1875

Species of snout moth

Jocara cristalis is a species of snout moth in the genus Jocara. It was described by Cajetan Felder, Rudolf Felder and Alois Friedrich Rogenhofer in 1875. It is found in Brazil.
