= Jocara multicolor =

Scientific classification
- Kingdom: Animalia
- Phylum: Arthropoda
- Clade: Pancrustacea
- Class: Insecta
- Order: Lepidoptera
- Family: Pyralidae
- Genus: Jocara
- Species: J. multicolor

Binomial name
- Jocara multicolor Dognin, 1904

Synonyms
- Deuterollyta multicolor

Species of moth

Jocara multicolor is a species of snout moth in the genus Jocara. It is found in South America.
