= Jocara subfusca =

Scientific classification
- Domain: Eukaryota
- Kingdom: Animalia
- Phylum: Arthropoda
- Class: Insecta
- Order: Lepidoptera
- Family: Pyralidae
- Genus: Jocara
- Species: J. subfusca

Binomial name
- Jocara subfusca Schaus, 1912

Synonyms
- Deuterollyta subfusca

Species of moth

Jocara subfusca is a species of snout moth in the genus Jocara. It is found in Costa Rica.
