= Jocara monosemia =

Scientific classification
- Kingdom: Animalia
- Phylum: Arthropoda
- Clade: Pancrustacea
- Class: Insecta
- Order: Lepidoptera
- Family: Pyralidae
- Genus: Jocara
- Species: J. monosemia

Binomial name
- Jocara monosemia Zeller, 1881

Synonyms
- Deuterollyta monosemia

Species of moth

Jocara monosemia is a species of snout moth in the genus Jocara. It is found in Brazil.
