= Jocara extensa =

Scientific classification
- Kingdom: Animalia
- Phylum: Arthropoda
- Class: Insecta
- Order: Lepidoptera
- Family: Pyralidae
- Genus: Jocara
- Species: J. extensa

Binomial name
- Jocara extensa (Walker, 1863)

Synonyms
- Stericta extensa Walker, 1863; Nephopteryx extensa; Deuterollyta extensa; Deuterollyta variegata Warren, 1891

Species of moth

Jocara extensa is a species of snout moth in the genus Jocara. It was described by Francis Walker in 1863. It is found in the Guyanas and Brazil.
