= Jocara nigripuncta =

Scientific classification
- Kingdom: Animalia
- Phylum: Arthropoda
- Class: Insecta
- Order: Lepidoptera
- Family: Pyralidae
- Genus: Jocara
- Species: J. nigripuncta

Binomial name
- Jocara nigripuncta Schaus, 1912

Synonyms
- Deuterollyta nigripuncta

Species of moth

Jocara nigripuncta is a species of snout moth in the genus Jocara. It is found in Costa Rica.
