= Jocara ragonoti =

Scientific classification
- Domain: Eukaryota
- Kingdom: Animalia
- Phylum: Arthropoda
- Class: Insecta
- Order: Lepidoptera
- Family: Pyralidae
- Genus: Jocara
- Species: J. ragonoti

Binomial name
- Jocara ragonoti (Möschler, 1890)

Synonyms
- Deuterollyta ragonoti Möschler, 1890

Species of moth

Jocara ragonoti is a species of snout moth in the genus Jocara. It is found in Puerto Rico.

The larvae have been recorded feeding on Conocarpus erectus.
