= Jocara oediperalis =

Scientific classification
- Kingdom: Animalia
- Phylum: Arthropoda
- Class: Insecta
- Order: Lepidoptera
- Family: Pyralidae
- Genus: Jocara
- Species: J. oediperalis

Binomial name
- Jocara oediperalis Hampson, 1906

Synonyms
- Deuterollyta oediperalis; Ajacara phileasalis Schaus, 1925

Species of moth

Jocara oediperalis is a species of snout moth in the genus Jocara. It is found in Panama and South America.
