= Jocara =

Scientific classification
- Kingdom: Animalia
- Phylum: Arthropoda
- Class: Insecta
- Order: Lepidoptera
- Family: Pyralidae
- Subfamily: Epipaschiinae
- Genus: Jocara; Walker, 1863

Type species
- Jocara fragilis Walker, 1863

Synonyms
- Deuterollyta Lederer, 1863; Winona Hulst, 1888; Oedomia Dognin, 1906; Ajacania Schaus, 1925; Ajocara Schaus, 1925

Genus of moths

Jocara is a genus of snout moths. It was described by Francis Walker in 1863.

== Species ==
- Jocara abachuma
- Jocara aidana
- Jocara albiferalis
- Jocara albimedialis
- Jocara albimedialis
- Jocara amazonalis
- Jocara anacita
- Jocara anastasia
- Jocara andeola
- Jocara ansberti
- Jocara athanasia
- Jocara basilata
- Jocara bryoxantha
- Jocara cacalis (C. Felder, R. Felder & Rogenhofer, 1875)
- Jocara cantianilla
- Jocara chlorisalis
- Jocara chrysoderas
- Jocara claudalis
- Jocara cononalis
- Jocara conrana
- Jocara conspicualis Lederer, 1863
- Jocara cristalis C. Felder, R. Felder & Rogenhofer, 1875
- Jocara dapha
- Jocara desideria
- Jocara extensa (Walker, 1863)
- Jocara fragilis Walker, 1863
- Jocara francesca
- Jocara fuscifusalis
- Jocara gillalis
- Jocara hemizonalis
- Jocara hispida (Dognin, 1906)
- Jocara hospitia
- Jocara lactiferalis
- Jocara lutosalis (Amsel, 1956)
- Jocara majuscula
- Jocara malrubia
- Jocara marchiana
- Jocara maroa
- Jocara martinia
- Jocara maurontia
- Jocara mava
- Jocara mediosinalis
- Jocara monosemia
- Jocara multicolor
- Jocara nana
- Jocara nigripuncta
- Jocara nigrisquama
- Jocara noloides
- Jocara oduvalda
- Jocara oediperalis
- Jocara olivescens
- Jocara pagiroa
- Jocara parallelalis
- Jocara pictalis
- Jocara prudentia
- Jocara pyropicta
- Jocara ragonoti
- Jocara raymonda
- Jocara rubralis
- Jocara rufitinctalis (Hampson, 1906)
- Jocara sara
- Jocara sisinnia
- Jocara subcurvalis
- Jocara subfusca
- Jocara suiferens
- Jocara tenebrosa
- Jocara terrenalis
- Jocara thermochroalis
- Jocara theliana
- Jocara thilloa
- Jocara translinea
- Jocara umbrosalis
- Jocara venezuelensis
- Jocara yva
- Jocara zetila

== Former species ==
- Jocara breviornatalis (Grote, 1877), transferred back to revived Toripalpus in 1993 (now Toripalpus breviornatalis)
- Jocara trabalis, same as prior (now Toripalpus trabalis)
