= Jocara zetila =

Scientific classification
- Domain: Eukaryota
- Kingdom: Animalia
- Phylum: Arthropoda
- Class: Insecta
- Order: Lepidoptera
- Family: Pyralidae
- Genus: Jocara
- Species: J. zetila

Binomial name
- Jocara zetila (H. Druce, 1902)

Synonyms
- Stericta zetila H. Druce, 1902; Deuterollyta zetila; Jocara luciana Schaus, 1922

Species of moth

Jocara zetila is a species of snout moth in the genus Jocara. The species was first described by Herbert Druce in 1902. It is found in Guatemala and Colombia.
