= Jocara aidana =

Scientific classification
- Domain: Eukaryota
- Kingdom: Animalia
- Phylum: Arthropoda
- Class: Insecta
- Order: Lepidoptera
- Family: Pyralidae
- Genus: Jocara
- Species: J. aidana

Binomial name
- Jocara aidana Schaus, 1922

Synonyms
- Deuterollyta aidana

Species of moth

Jocara aidana is a species of snout moth in the genus Jocara. It is found in Brazil.
