= Jocara rufitinctalis =

Scientific classification
- Kingdom: Animalia
- Phylum: Arthropoda
- Class: Insecta
- Order: Lepidoptera
- Family: Pyralidae
- Genus: Jocara
- Species: J. rufitinctalis

Binomial name
- Jocara rufitinctalis (Hampson, 1906)

Synonyms
- Tetralopha rufitinctalis Hampson, 1906; Pococera rufitinctalis; Deuterollyta rufitinctalis; Auradisa corumba Schaus, 1922

Species of moth

Jocara rufitinctalis is a species of snout moth in the genus Jocara. It was described by George Hampson in 1906. It is found in Paraguay and Brazil.
