= Jocara hispida =

Scientific classification
- Domain: Eukaryota
- Kingdom: Animalia
- Phylum: Arthropoda
- Class: Insecta
- Order: Lepidoptera
- Family: Pyralidae
- Genus: Jocara
- Species: J. hispida

Binomial name
- Jocara hispida (Dognin, 1906)

Synonyms
- Oedamia hispida Dognin, 1906; Deuterollyta hispida; Ajacaria amazona Schaus, 1925

Species of moth

Jocara hispida is a species of snout moth in the genus Jocara. It was described by Paul Dognin in 1906. It is found in South America.
