= Jocara umbrosalis =

Scientific classification
- Domain: Eukaryota
- Kingdom: Animalia
- Phylum: Arthropoda
- Class: Insecta
- Order: Lepidoptera
- Family: Pyralidae
- Genus: Jocara
- Species: J. umbrosalis

Binomial name
- Jocara umbrosalis (Schaus, 1912)

Synonyms
- Stericta umbrosalis Schaus, 1912; Deuterollyta umbrosalis

Species of moth

Jocara umbrosalis is a species of snout moth in the genus Jocara. It is found in Costa Rica.
