= Jocara theliana =

Scientific classification
- Domain: Eukaryota
- Kingdom: Animalia
- Phylum: Arthropoda
- Class: Insecta
- Order: Lepidoptera
- Family: Pyralidae
- Genus: Jocara
- Species: J. theliana

Binomial name
- Jocara theliana Schaus, 1922

Species of moth

Jocara theliana is a species of snout moth. It is found in Guatemala.
