= Jocara fragilis =

Scientific classification
- Kingdom: Animalia
- Phylum: Arthropoda
- Class: Insecta
- Order: Lepidoptera
- Family: Pyralidae
- Genus: Jocara
- Species: J. fragilis

Binomial name
- Jocara fragilis Walker, 1863

Species of moth

Jocara fragilis is a species of snout moth in the genus Jocara. It was described by Francis Walker in 1863. It is found in the Dominican Republic.
