= Jocara pictalis =

Scientific classification
- Kingdom: Animalia
- Phylum: Arthropoda
- Class: Insecta
- Order: Lepidoptera
- Family: Pyralidae
- Genus: Jocara
- Species: J. pictalis

Binomial name
- Jocara pictalis Hampson, 1906

Species of moth

Jocara pictalis is a species of snout moth. It is found in Brazil.
