= Jocara raymonda =

Scientific classification
- Kingdom: Animalia
- Phylum: Arthropoda
- Class: Insecta
- Order: Lepidoptera
- Family: Pyralidae
- Genus: Jocara
- Species: J. raymonda

Binomial name
- Jocara raymonda Schaus, 1922

Synonyms
- Deuterollyta raymonda

Species of moth

Jocara raymonda is a species of snout moth in the genus Jocara. It is found in French Guiana.
