= Jocara chrysoderas =

Scientific classification
- Domain: Eukaryota
- Kingdom: Animalia
- Phylum: Arthropoda
- Class: Insecta
- Order: Lepidoptera
- Family: Pyralidae
- Genus: Jocara
- Species: J. chrysoderas

Binomial name
- Jocara chrysoderas (Dyar, 1917)

Synonyms
- Pococera chrysoderas Dyar, 1917; Deuterollyta chrysoderas

Species of moth

Jocara chrysoderas is a species of snout moth in the genus Jocara. It is found in Guyana.
