= Jocara thilloa =

Scientific classification
- Domain: Eukaryota
- Kingdom: Animalia
- Phylum: Arthropoda
- Class: Insecta
- Order: Lepidoptera
- Family: Pyralidae
- Genus: Jocara
- Species: J. thilloa

Binomial name
- Jocara thilloa Schaus, 1922

Species of moth

Jocara thilloa is a species of snout moth. It is found in Guatemala.
