= Jocara parallelalis =

Scientific classification
- Kingdom: Animalia
- Phylum: Arthropoda
- Class: Insecta
- Order: Lepidoptera
- Family: Pyralidae
- Genus: Jocara
- Species: J. parallelalis

Binomial name
- Jocara parallelalis Hampson, 1916

Species of moth

Jocara parallelalis is a species of snout moth. It is found in Peru.
