= Jocara hospitia =

Scientific classification
- Domain: Eukaryota
- Kingdom: Animalia
- Phylum: Arthropoda
- Class: Insecta
- Order: Lepidoptera
- Family: Pyralidae
- Genus: Jocara
- Species: J. hospitia

Binomial name
- Jocara hospitia Schaus, 1925

Synonyms
- Deuterollyta hospitia

Species of moth

Jocara hospitia is a species of snout moth in the genus Jocara. It is found in South America.
