= Jocara basilata =

Scientific classification
- Domain: Eukaryota
- Kingdom: Animalia
- Phylum: Arthropoda
- Class: Insecta
- Order: Lepidoptera
- Family: Pyralidae
- Genus: Jocara
- Species: J. basilata

Binomial name
- Jocara basilata (Schaus, 1912)

Synonyms
- Isolopha basilata Schaus, 1912; Deuterollyta basilata

Species of moth

Jocara basilata is a species of snout moth in the genus Jocara. It is found in Costa Rica.
