= Jocara martinia =

Scientific classification
- Domain: Eukaryota
- Kingdom: Animalia
- Phylum: Arthropoda
- Class: Insecta
- Order: Lepidoptera
- Family: Pyralidae
- Genus: Jocara
- Species: J. martinia

Binomial name
- Jocara martinia Schaus, 1922

Synonyms
- Deuterollyta martinia

Species of moth

Jocara martinia is a species of snout moth in the genus Jocara. It is found in Guatemala.
