= Jocara malrubia =

Scientific classification
- Domain: Eukaryota
- Kingdom: Animalia
- Phylum: Arthropoda
- Class: Insecta
- Order: Lepidoptera
- Family: Pyralidae
- Genus: Jocara
- Species: J. malrubia

Binomial name
- Jocara malrubia (Schaus, 1934)

Synonyms
- Cecidipta malrubia Schaus, 1934; Deuterollyta malrubia

Species of moth

Jocara malrubia is a species of snout moth in the genus Jocara. It is found in Brazil.
