= Jocara mediosinalis =

Scientific classification
- Kingdom: Animalia
- Phylum: Arthropoda
- Clade: Pancrustacea
- Class: Insecta
- Order: Lepidoptera
- Family: Pyralidae
- Genus: Jocara
- Species: J. mediosinalis

Binomial name
- Jocara mediosinalis (Hampson, 1916)

Synonyms
- Pococera mediosinalis Hampson, 1916; Deuterollyta mediosinalis

Species of moth

Jocara mediosinalis is a species of snout moth in the genus Jocara. It is found in South America.
