= Jocara pyropicta =

Scientific classification
- Kingdom: Animalia
- Phylum: Arthropoda
- Class: Insecta
- Order: Lepidoptera
- Family: Pyralidae
- Genus: Jocara
- Species: J. pyropicta

Binomial name
- Jocara pyropicta Schaus, 1934

Synonyms
- Deuterollyta pyropicta

Species of moth

Jocara pyropicta is a species of snout moth in the genus Jocara. It is found in Brazil.
