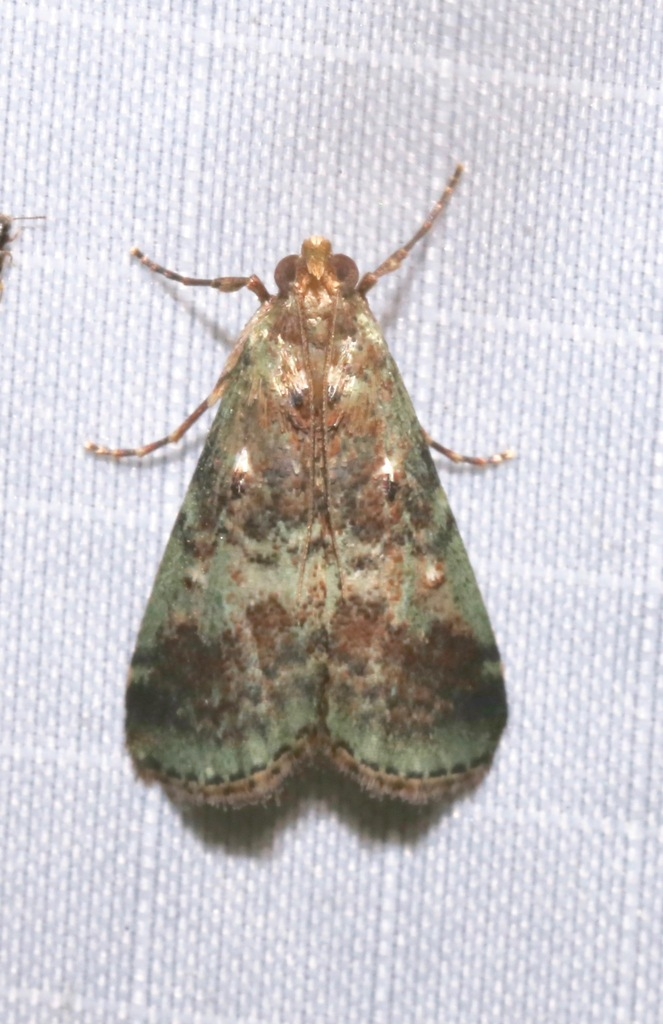

Scientific classification
- Domain: Eukaryota
- Kingdom: Animalia
- Phylum: Arthropoda
- Class: Insecta
- Order: Lepidoptera
- Family: Pyralidae
- Genus: Jocara
- Species: J. majuscula

Binomial name
- Jocara majuscula (Herrich-Schäffer, 1871)

Synonyms
- Deuterollyta majuscula Herrich-Schäffer, 1871; Toripalpus incrustalis Hulst, 1887; Deuterollyta infectalis Moeschler, 1890; Jocara ferrifusalis Hampson, 1906; Jocara obscuralis Schaus, 1912; Jocara perseella Barnes & McDunnough, 1913; Jocara musettalis Schaus, 1934

= Jocara majuscula =

Species of moth

Jocara majuscula is a species of snout moth in the genus Jocara. It was described by Gottlieb August Wilhelm Herrich-Schäffer in 1871, and it is found in California, Florida, Central America, Cuba, Puerto Rico and Jamaica.
