= Jocara suiferens =

Scientific classification
- Domain: Eukaryota
- Kingdom: Animalia
- Phylum: Arthropoda
- Class: Insecta
- Order: Lepidoptera
- Family: Pyralidae
- Genus: Jocara
- Species: J. suiferens

Binomial name
- Jocara suiferens Dyar, 1913

Synonyms
- Deuterollyta suiferens

Species of moth

Jocara suiferens is a species of snout moth in the genus Jocara. It was described by Harrison Gray Dyar Jr. in 1913, and is known from Peru.
