= Jocara cacalis =

Scientific classification
- Domain: Eukaryota
- Kingdom: Animalia
- Phylum: Arthropoda
- Class: Insecta
- Order: Lepidoptera
- Family: Pyralidae
- Genus: Jocara
- Species: J. cacalis

Binomial name
- Jocara cacalis (C. Felder, R. Felder & Rogenhofer, 1875)

Synonyms
- Hemimatia cacalis C. Felder, R. Felder & Rogenhofer, 1875; Deuterollyta cacalis

Species of moth

Jocara cacalis is a species of snout moth in the genus Jocara It was described by Cajetan Felder, Rudolf Felder and Alois Friedrich Rogenhofer in 1875. It is found in French Guiana.
