= Jocara ansberti =

Scientific classification
- Domain: Eukaryota
- Kingdom: Animalia
- Phylum: Arthropoda
- Class: Insecta
- Order: Lepidoptera
- Family: Pyralidae
- Genus: Jocara
- Species: J. ansberti

Binomial name
- Jocara ansberti Schaus, 1922

Synonyms
- Deuterollyta ansberti

Species of moth

Jocara ansberti is a species of snout moth in the genus Jocara. It is found in French Guiana.
