= Jocara dapha =

Scientific classification
- Domain: Eukaryota
- Kingdom: Animalia
- Phylum: Arthropoda
- Class: Insecta
- Order: Lepidoptera
- Family: Pyralidae
- Genus: Jocara
- Species: J. dapha

Binomial name
- Jocara dapha (H. Druce, 1895)

Synonyms
- Stericta dapha H. Druce, 1895; Deuterollyta dapha; Stericta nigropunctata H. Druce, 1902

Species of moth

Jocara dapha is a species of snout moth in the genus Jocara first described by Herbert Druce in 1895. It is found in Colombia and Central America.
