= Jocara lactiferalis =

Scientific classification
- Kingdom: Animalia
- Phylum: Arthropoda
- Class: Insecta
- Order: Lepidoptera
- Family: Pyralidae
- Genus: Jocara
- Species: J. lactiferalis

Binomial name
- Jocara lactiferalis Hampson, 1916

Synonyms
- Deuterollyta lactiferalis

Species of moth

Jocara lactiferalis is a species of snout moth in the genus Jocara. It is found in South America.
