= Jocara noloides =

Scientific classification
- Kingdom: Animalia
- Phylum: Arthropoda
- Class: Insecta
- Order: Lepidoptera
- Family: Pyralidae
- Genus: Jocara
- Species: J. noloides

Binomial name
- Jocara noloides Hampson, 1916

Species of moth

Jocara noloides is a species of snout moth. It is found on the Bahamas.
