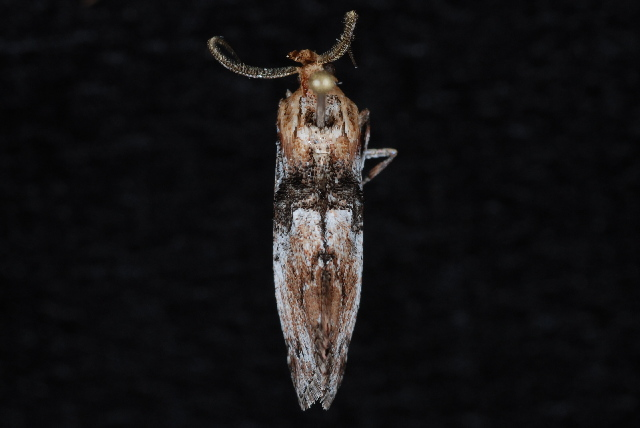
- Toripalpus trabalis

Scientific classification
- Kingdom: Animalia
- Phylum: Arthropoda
- Clade: Pancrustacea
- Class: Insecta
- Order: Lepidoptera
- Family: Pyralidae
- Subfamily: Epipaschiinae
- Genus: Toripalpus; Grote, 1878

Type species
- Toripalpus breviornatalis Grote, 1878

= Toripalpus =

Genus of moths

Toripalpus is a genus of snout moths. It was described by Augustus Radcliffe Grote in 1878, and was formerly considered synonymous to Jocara, but resurrected as valid taxon in 1993.

== Species ==
- Toripalpus breviornatalis Grote, 1878
- Toripalpus trabalis Grote, 1881
