= Jocara lutosalis =

Scientific classification
- Domain: Eukaryota
- Kingdom: Animalia
- Phylum: Arthropoda
- Class: Insecta
- Order: Lepidoptera
- Family: Pyralidae
- Genus: Jocara
- Species: J. lutosalis

Binomial name
- Jocara lutosalis Amsel, 1956

Synonyms
- Deuterollyta lutosalis

Species of moth

Jocara lutosalis is a species of snout moth in the genus Jocara. It was described by Hans Georg Amsel in 1956. It is found in Venezuela.
