= Jocara bryoxantha =

Scientific classification
- Kingdom: Animalia
- Phylum: Arthropoda
- Class: Insecta
- Order: Lepidoptera
- Family: Pyralidae
- Genus: Jocara
- Species: J. bryoxantha

Binomial name
- Jocara bryoxantha Meyrick, 1936

Synonyms
- Deuterollyta bryoxantha

Species of moth

Jocara bryoxantha is a species of snout moth in the genus Jocara. It is found in Bolivia.
