= Jocara conrana =

Scientific classification
- Domain: Eukaryota
- Kingdom: Animalia
- Phylum: Arthropoda
- Class: Insecta
- Order: Lepidoptera
- Family: Pyralidae
- Genus: Jocara
- Species: J. conrana

Binomial name
- Jocara conrana Schaus, 1922

Synonyms
- Deuterollyta conrana

Species of moth

Jocara conrana is a species of snout moth in the genus Jocara. It is found in Peru.
