= Jocara albimedialis =

Scientific classification
- Kingdom: Animalia
- Phylum: Arthropoda
- Class: Insecta
- Order: Lepidoptera
- Family: Pyralidae
- Genus: Jocara
- Species: J. albimedialis

Binomial name
- Jocara albimedialis Hampson, 1916

Synonyms
- Deuterollyta albimedialis

Species of moth

Jocara albimedialis is a species of snout moth in the genus Jocara. It is found in Peru.
