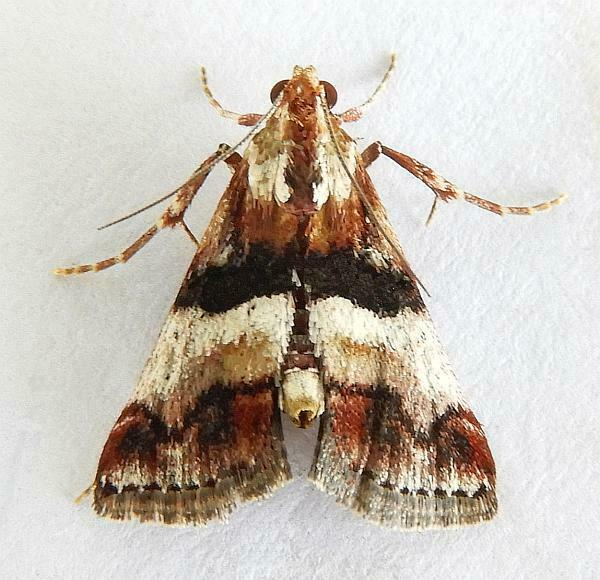

Scientific classification
- Kingdom: Animalia
- Phylum: Arthropoda
- Class: Insecta
- Order: Lepidoptera
- Family: Pyralidae
- Genus: Toripalpus
- Species: T. breviornatalis

Binomial name
- Toripalpus breviornatalis Grote, 1878

Synonyms
- Jocara breviornatalis (Grote, 1878)

= Toripalpus breviornatalis =

Species of moth

Toripalpus breviornatalis is a species of snout moth, and type species of the genus Toripalpus. It is found in the U.S. states of Texas, Oklahoma and Florida.

== Taxonomic history ==
Both species and genus were first described in 1878 by Augustus Radcliffe Grote.

For a time, Toripalpus was deemed a synonym of Jocara, and the species was included as Jocara breviornatalis in the 1983 Hodges checklist. In 1993, the original genus was revived by M. Alma Solis, with both J. breviornatalis and J. trabalis transferred back to Toripalpus, where they remain placed as of December 2024.
