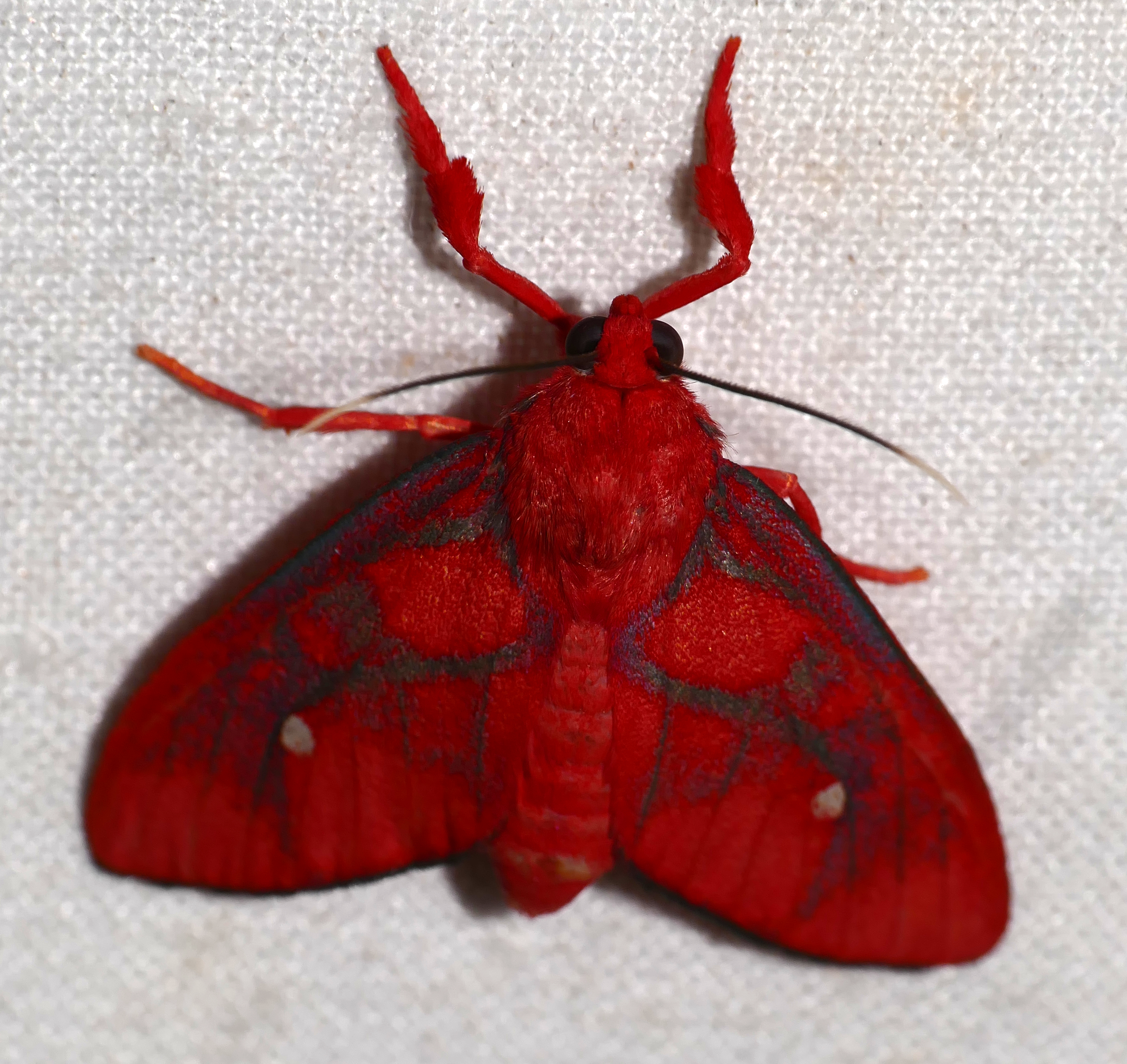

Scientific classification
- Domain: Eukaryota
- Kingdom: Animalia
- Phylum: Arthropoda
- Class: Insecta
- Order: Lepidoptera
- Superfamily: Noctuoidea
- Family: Erebidae
- Subfamily: Arctiinae
- Genus: Ernassa
- Species: E. cruenta

Binomial name
- Ernassa cruenta (Rothschild, 1909)

Synonyms
- Automolis cruenta Rothschild, 1909

= Ernassa cruenta =

Species of moth

Ernassa cruenta is a moth of the family Erebidae first described by Walter Rothschild in 1909. It is found in French Guiana, Ecuador, Peru and the Brazilian state of Amazonas.
