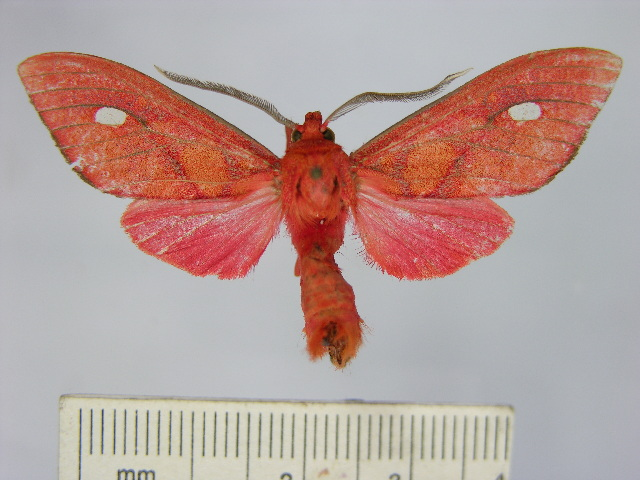

Scientific classification
- Domain: Eukaryota
- Kingdom: Animalia
- Phylum: Arthropoda
- Class: Insecta
- Order: Lepidoptera
- Superfamily: Noctuoidea
- Family: Erebidae
- Subfamily: Arctiinae
- Genus: Ernassa
- Species: E. justina

Binomial name
- Ernassa justina (Stoll, [1782])

Synonyms
- Phalaena justina Stoll, [1782]

= Ernassa justina =

Species of moth

Ernassa justina is a moth of the family Erebidae first described by Caspar Stoll in 1782. It is found in French Guiana and Suriname.
