= Ernassa gabriellae =

Scientific classification
- Domain: Eukaryota
- Kingdom: Animalia
- Phylum: Arthropoda
- Class: Insecta
- Order: Lepidoptera
- Superfamily: Noctuoidea
- Family: Erebidae
- Subfamily: Arctiinae
- Genus: Ernassa
- Species: E. gabriellae

Binomial name
- Ernassa gabriellae Travassos, 1954

Species of moth

Ernassa gabriellae is a moth of the family Erebidae first described by Travassos in 1954. It is found in Brazil.
