= Leucochroma colombiensis =

Scientific classification
- Kingdom: Animalia
- Phylum: Arthropoda
- Class: Insecta
- Order: Lepidoptera
- Family: Crambidae
- Genus: Leucochroma
- Species: L. colombiensis

Binomial name
- Leucochroma colombiensis Hampson, 1912

Synonyms
- Leucochroma colombensis; Leucochroma columbiensis

Species of moth

Leucochroma colombiensis is a moth in the family Crambidae. It was described by George Hampson in 1912. It is found in Colombia.
