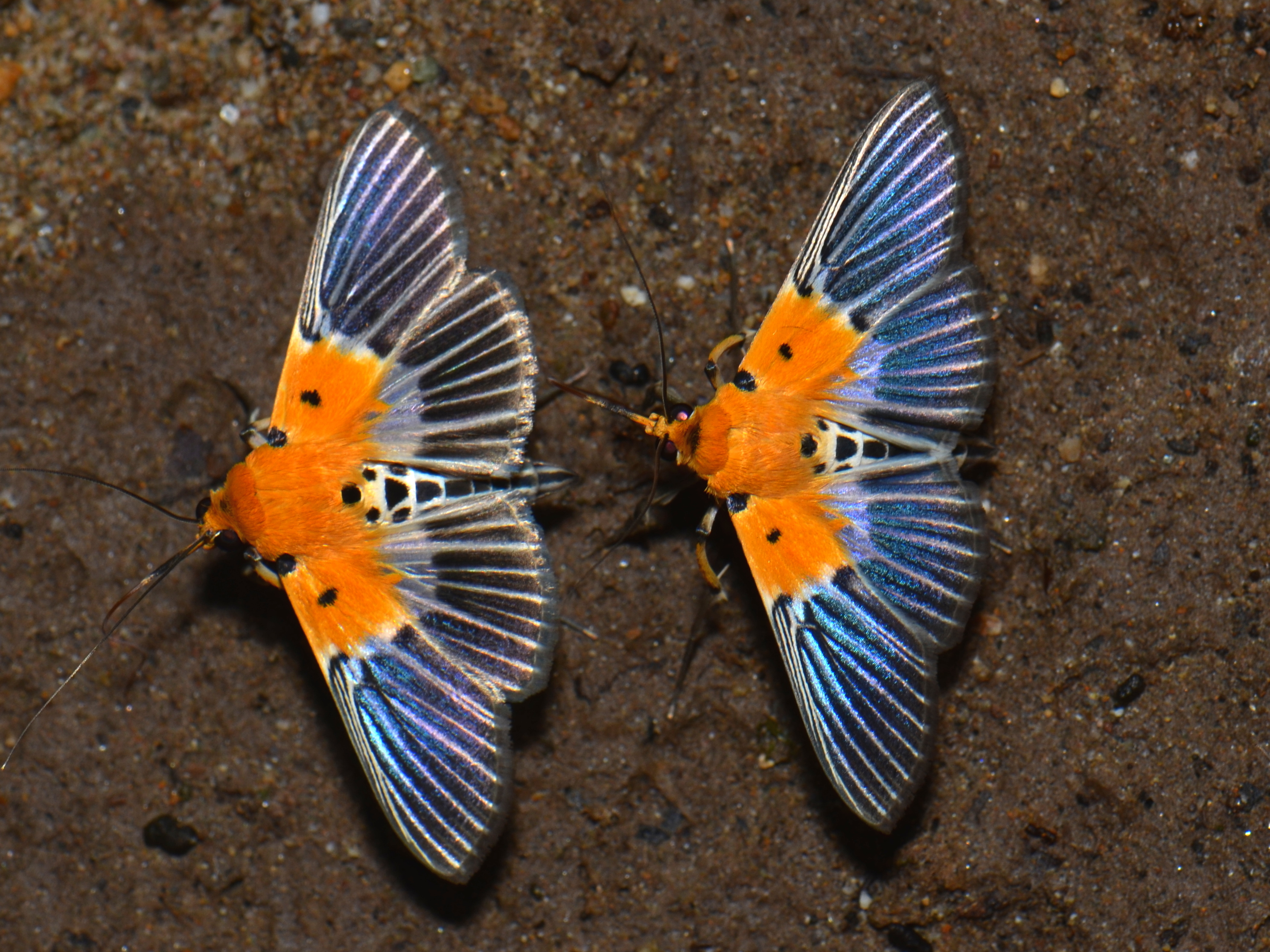
- Nevrina procopia

Scientific classification
- Domain: Eukaryota
- Kingdom: Animalia
- Phylum: Arthropoda
- Class: Insecta
- Order: Lepidoptera
- Family: Crambidae
- Subfamily: Pyraustinae
- Genus: Nevrina; Guenée, 1854

Synonyms
- Neurina Moore, 1886

= Nevrina =

Genus of moths

Nevrina is a genus of moths of the family Crambidae.

== Species ==
- Nevrina procopia (Stoll in Cramer & Stoll, 1781)
- Nevrina radiata Ghesquière, 1942
- Nevrina verlainei Ghesquière, 1942
