= Leucochroma jamaicensis =

Scientific classification
- Kingdom: Animalia
- Phylum: Arthropoda
- Class: Insecta
- Order: Lepidoptera
- Family: Crambidae
- Genus: Leucochroma
- Species: L. jamaicensis

Binomial name
- Leucochroma jamaicensis Hampson, 1912

Species of moth

Leucochroma jamaicensis is a moth in the family Crambidae. It was described by George Hampson in 1912. It is found in Jamaica. It is also found in Cuba.
