= Nevrina radiata =

Scientific classification
- Domain: Eukaryota
- Kingdom: Animalia
- Phylum: Arthropoda
- Class: Insecta
- Order: Lepidoptera
- Family: Crambidae
- Genus: Nevrina
- Species: N. radiata

Binomial name
- Nevrina radiata Ghesquière, 1942

Species of moth

Nevrina radiata is a moth in the family Crambidae. It was described by Jean Ghesquière in 1942. It is found in the Democratic Republic of the Congo, where it has been recorded from Équateur and Kasai-Oriental.
