= Leucochroma neutralis =

Scientific classification
- Kingdom: Animalia
- Phylum: Arthropoda
- Class: Insecta
- Order: Lepidoptera
- Family: Crambidae
- Genus: Leucochroma
- Species: L. neutralis

Binomial name
- Leucochroma neutralis Dognin, 1904

Species of moth

Leucochroma neutralis is a moth in the family Crambidae. It is found in Ecuador.
