= Leucochroma formosalis =

Scientific classification
- Kingdom: Animalia
- Phylum: Arthropoda
- Class: Insecta
- Order: Lepidoptera
- Family: Crambidae
- Genus: Leucochroma
- Species: L. formosalis

Binomial name
- Leucochroma formosalis Amsel, 1956

Species of moth

Leucochroma formosalis is a moth in the family Crambidae. It was described by Hans Georg Amsel in 1956 and is found in Venezuela.
