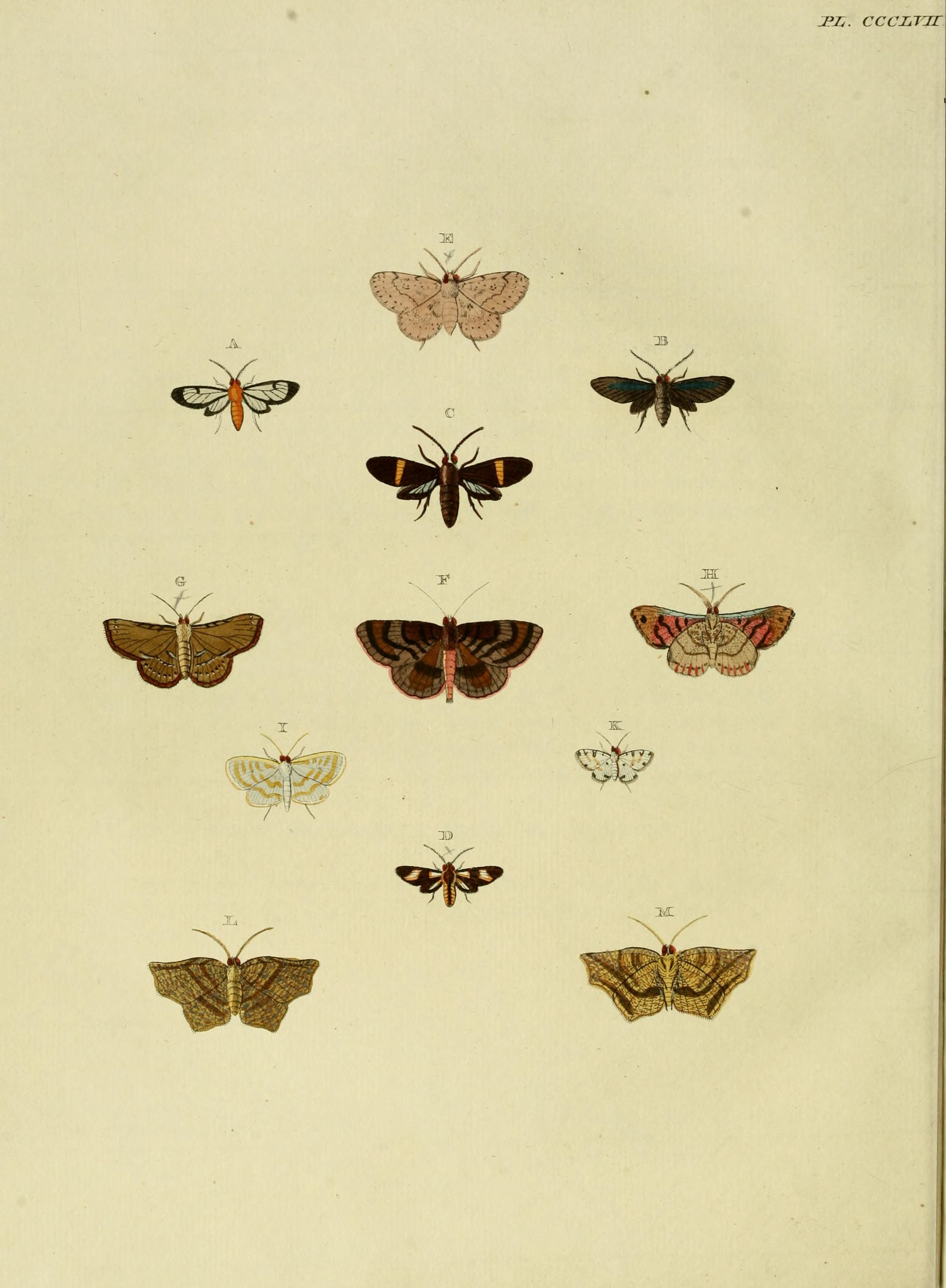
- I: "(Phalaena) Corope" ( = Leucochroma corope (Stoll, [1781])

Scientific classification
- Kingdom: Animalia
- Phylum: Arthropoda
- Clade: Pancrustacea
- Class: Insecta
- Order: Lepidoptera
- Family: Crambidae
- Genus: Leucochroma
- Species: L. corope

Binomial name
- Leucochroma corope (Stoll in Cramer & Stoll, 1781)

Synonyms
- Phalaena corope Stoll in Cramer & Stoll, 1781; Botys selectalis Walker, 1866; Leucochroma coropealis Guenée, 1854; Epipagis corrivalis Hübner, [1825]; Leucochroma minoralis Warren, 1889; Leucochroma mineralis; Phalaena Pyralis splendidalis Stoll in Cramer & Stoll, 1781

= Leucochroma corope =

Species of moth

Leucochroma corope is a moth in the family Crambidae. It was described by Stoll in 1781. It is found from the West Indies and Central America (including Mexico, Panama and Costa Rica) to South America (including Suriname and Colombia). It is an introduced species in Florida.

The wingspan is about 23 mm. Adults are on wing from January to June, in August and from November to December in Florida.
