= Leucochroma =

Scientific classification
- Kingdom: Animalia
- Phylum: Arthropoda
- Clade: Pancrustacea
- Class: Insecta
- Order: Lepidoptera
- Family: Crambidae
- Tribe: Margaroniini
- Genus: Leucochroma; Guenée, 1854

Genus of moths

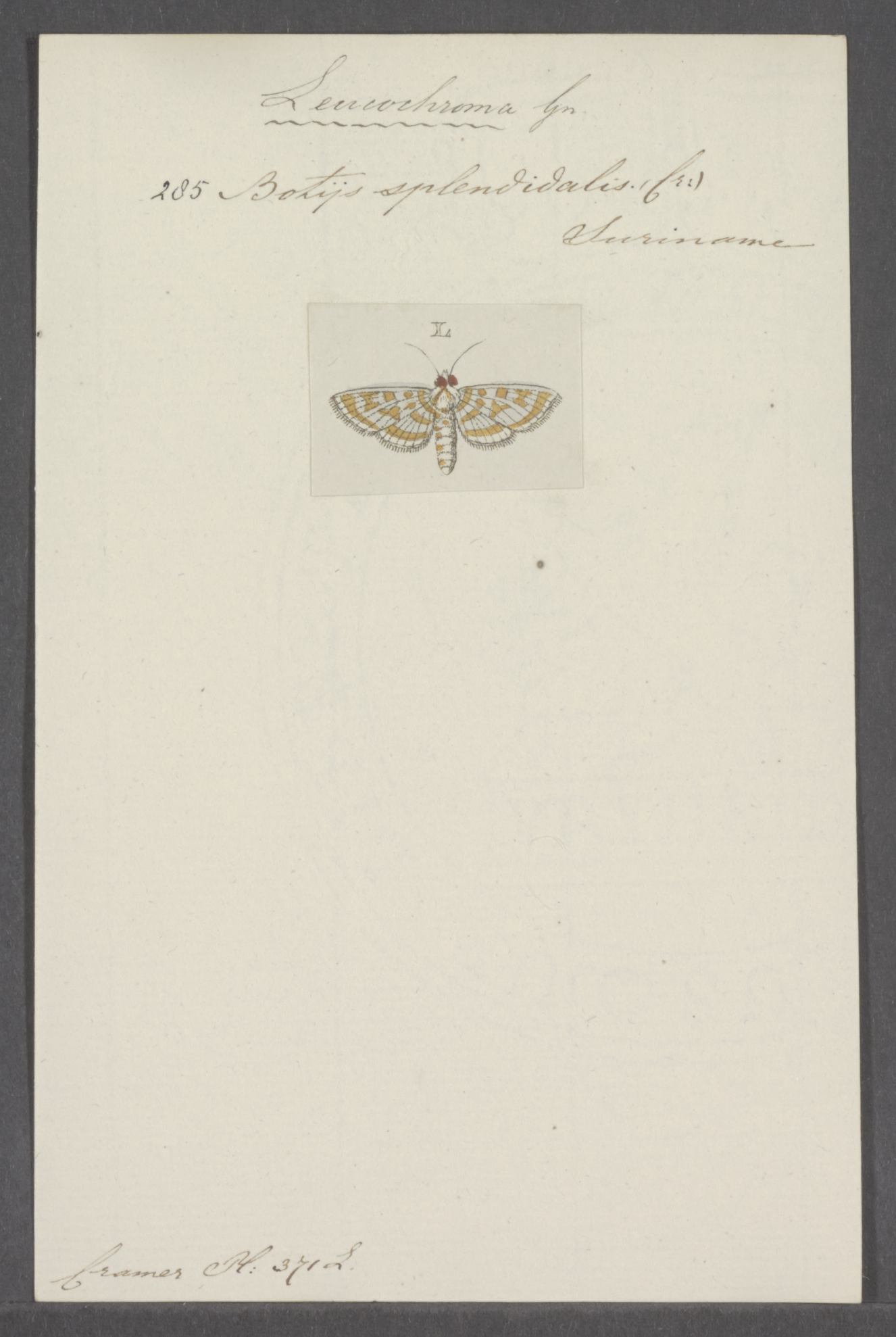

Leucochroma is a genus of moths of the family Crambidae.

== Species ==
- Leucochroma colombiensis Hampson, 1912
- Leucochroma corope (Stoll in Cramer & Stoll, 1781)
- Leucochroma formosalis Amsel, 1956
- Leucochroma hololeuca (Hampson, 1912)
- Leucochroma jamaicensis Hampson, 1912
- Leucochroma neutralis
