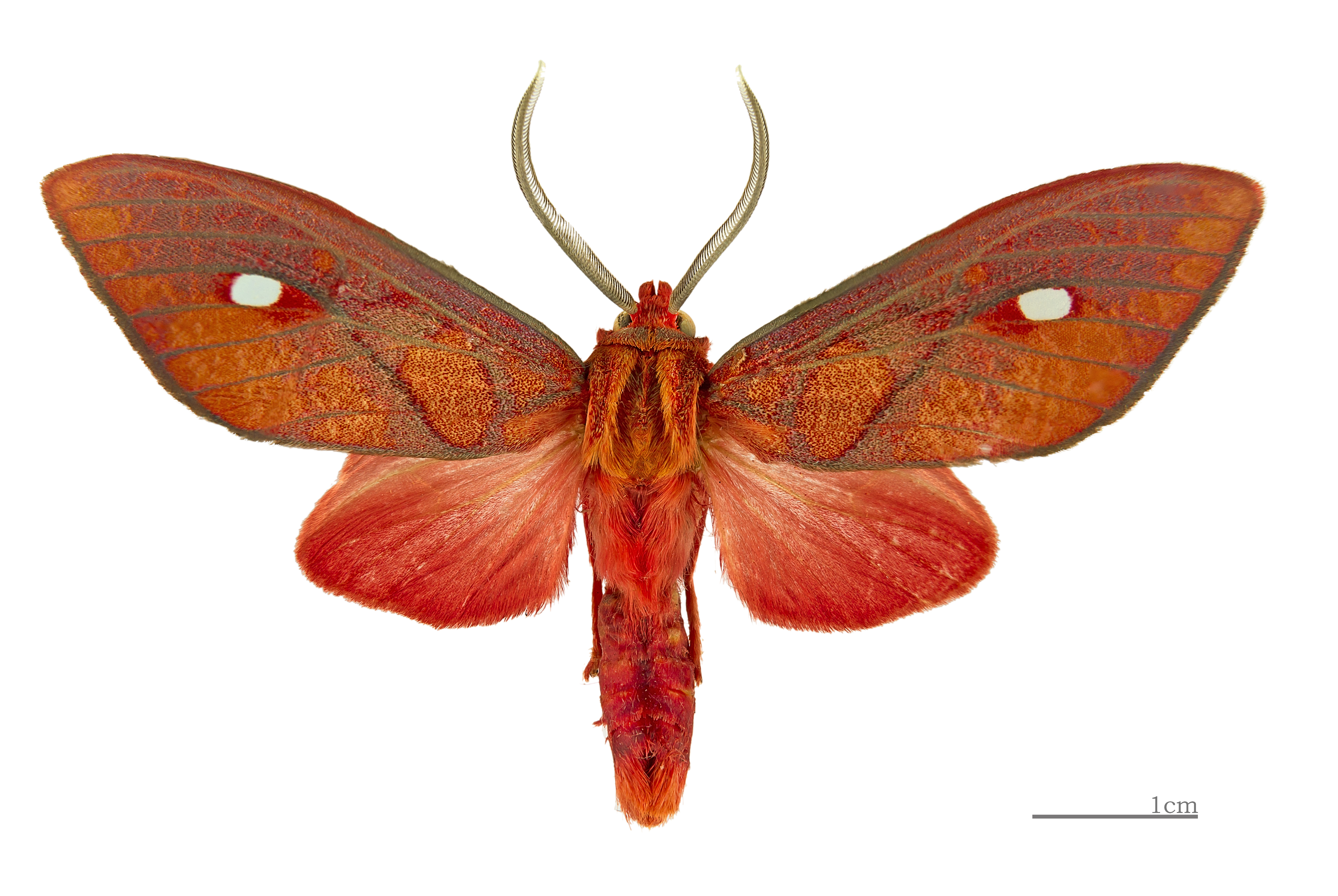

Scientific classification
- Domain: Eukaryota
- Kingdom: Animalia
- Phylum: Arthropoda
- Class: Insecta
- Order: Lepidoptera
- Superfamily: Noctuoidea
- Family: Erebidae
- Subfamily: Arctiinae
- Genus: Ernassa
- Species: E. sanguinolenta

Binomial name
- Ernassa sanguinolenta (Cramer, [1779])

Synonyms
- Phalaena sanguinolenta Cramer, [1779]

= Ernassa sanguinolenta =

Species of moth

Ernassa sanguinolenta is a moth of the family Erebidae first described by Pieter Cramer in 1779. It is found in French Guiana, Amazonas, Peru, Suriname and possibly Ecuador and Bolivia.
