= Leucochroma hololeuca =

Scientific classification
- Kingdom: Animalia
- Phylum: Arthropoda
- Class: Insecta
- Order: Lepidoptera
- Family: Crambidae
- Genus: Leucochroma
- Species: L. hololeuca

Binomial name
- Leucochroma hololeuca (Hampson, 1912)

Synonyms
- Glyphodes hololeuca Hampson, 1912

Species of moth

Leucochroma hololeuca is a moth in the family Crambidae. It was described by George Hampson in 1912. It is found on the Cayman Islands.
