= Nevrina verlainei =

Scientific classification
- Domain: Eukaryota
- Kingdom: Animalia
- Phylum: Arthropoda
- Class: Insecta
- Order: Lepidoptera
- Family: Crambidae
- Genus: Nevrina
- Species: N. verlainei

Binomial name
- Nevrina verlainei Ghesquière, 1942

Species of moth

Nevrina verlainei is a moth in the family Crambidae. It was described by Jean Ghesquière in 1942. It is found in the Democratic Republic of the Congo.
