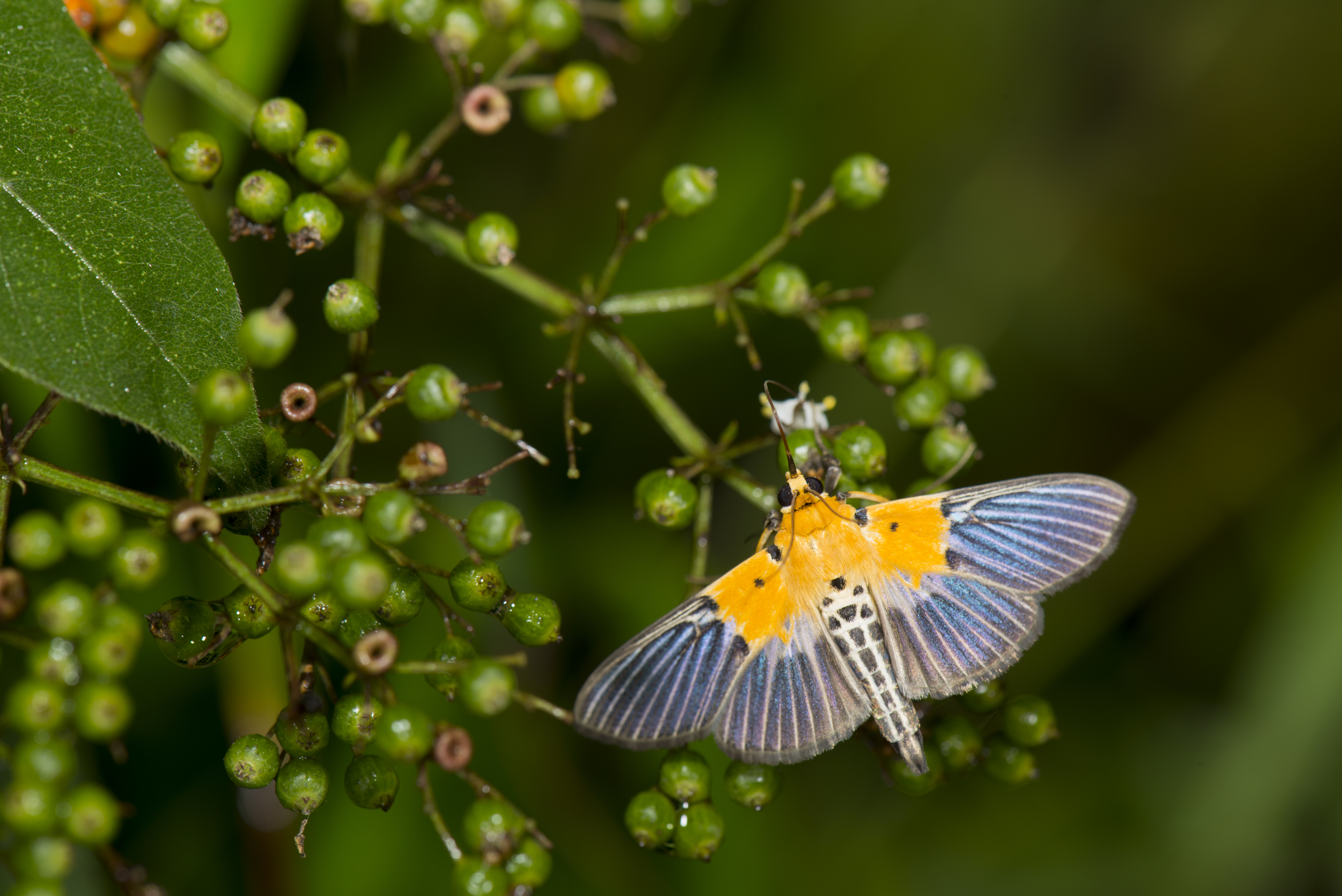

Scientific classification
- Domain: Eukaryota
- Kingdom: Animalia
- Phylum: Arthropoda
- Class: Insecta
- Order: Lepidoptera
- Family: Crambidae
- Genus: Nevrina
- Species: N. procopia

Binomial name
- Nevrina procopia (Stoll in Cramer & Stoll, 1781)

Synonyms
- Phalaena Pyralis procopia Stoll in Cramer & Stoll, 1781

= Nevrina procopia =

Species of moth

Nevrina procopia is a moth in the family Crambidae. It was described by Stoll in 1781. The type locality is unknown. It is found from Sri Lanka, India, Bhutan, South China, Taiwan, southern Japan, Philippines, Malaysia, Singapore, Sumatra, Java, and New Guinea.
