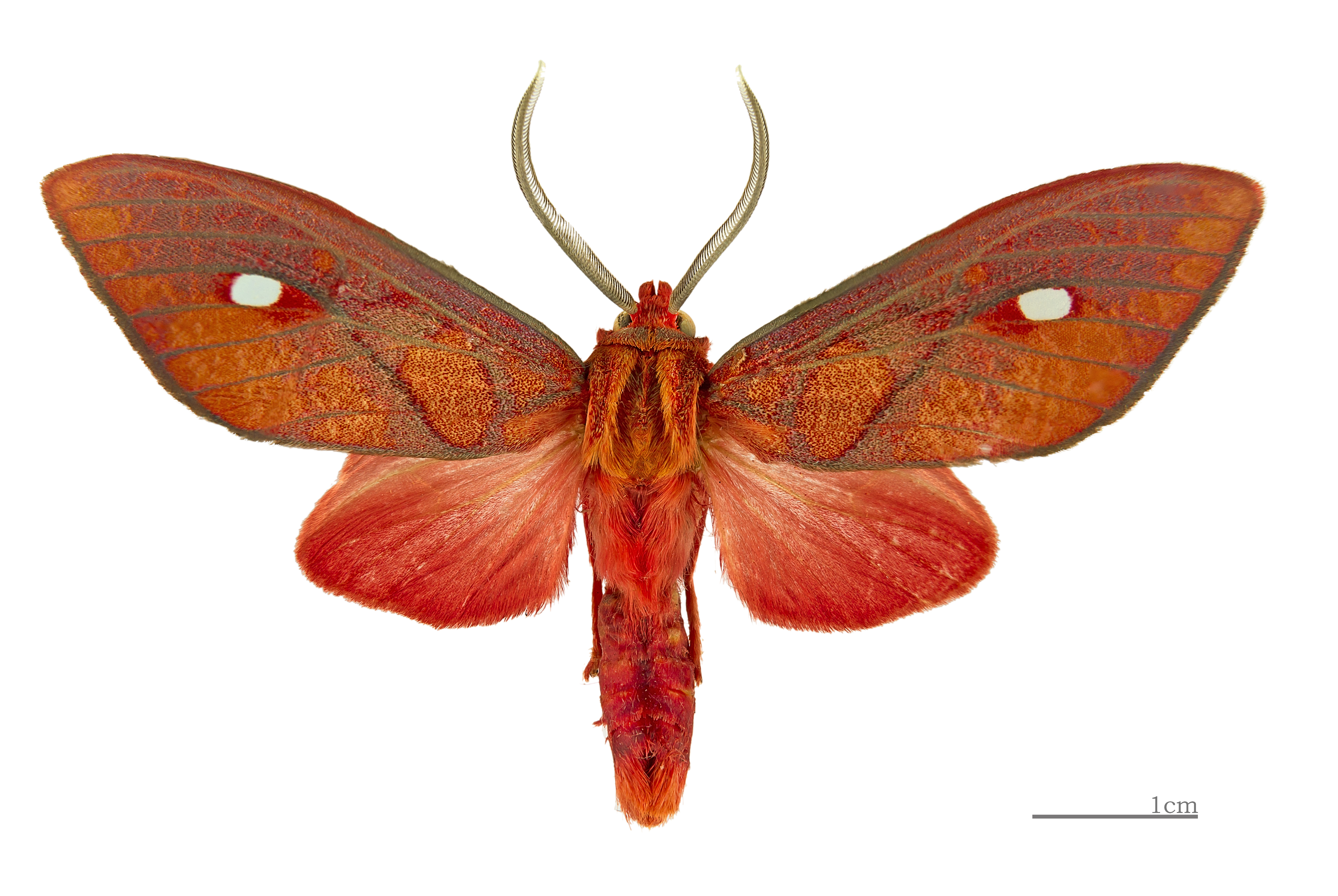
- Ernassa sanguinolenta

Scientific classification
- Kingdom: Animalia
- Phylum: Arthropoda
- Clade: Pancrustacea
- Class: Insecta
- Order: Lepidoptera
- Superfamily: Noctuoidea
- Family: Erebidae
- Subfamily: Arctiinae
- Subtribe: Phaegopterina
- Genus: Ernassa; Walker, 1856

= Ernassa =

Genus of moths

Ernassa is a genus of moths in the family Erebidae. The genus was erected by Francis Walker in 1856. For 40 years the genus has included 5 species, however 8 new species have been described as of 2024.

== Species ==
- Ernassa cruenta (Rothschild)
- Ernassa gabriellae Travassos
- Ernassa ignata Travassos
- Ernassa justina (Stoll)
- Ernassa sanguinolenta (Cramer)
- Ernassa inexplorata Grados
- Ernassa rufula Grados
- Ernassa persivalei Grados
- Ernassa tarisca Grados
- Ernassa skinnerorum Grados
- Ernassa harveyi Grados
- Ernassa markpacei Grados
- Ernassa abscondita Grados
