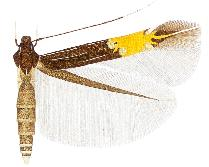

Scientific classification
- Kingdom: Animalia
- Phylum: Arthropoda
- Clade: Pancrustacea
- Class: Insecta
- Order: Lepidoptera
- Family: Cosmopterigidae
- Genus: Pebobs
- Species: P. isonoe

Binomial name
- Pebobs isonoe Koster, 2010

= Pebobs isonoe =

Species of moth

Pebobs isonoe is a moth of the family Cosmopterigidae. It has been found in Brazil (Pará) and Peru (Loreto). Adults have been recorded in March, August and September.

== Description ==
Pebobs isonoe has a forewing length of 2.9-3.8 mm. The colour of the forewing is dark brown, featuring five narrow white lines in the basal area. Two golden tubercular spots border the edge of the wing. At the apex, the cilia are dark brown, but near to the dorsum the cilia are paler. The hindwing is dark brownish grey, and is darker in females.

The colour of the head is primarily dark brown with white markings. The first segment of the labial palp is short and white, while the second segment is dark brown with white longitudinal lines. The third segment is also white. The antennae are dark brown with a white line from the base to two-thirds up.

The thorax and tegulae are dark brown with a reddish gloss, with the thorax having a posterior white spot. The legs too are mainly dark brown, with the femora of the midleg and hindleg shining white. The tibia and tarsus of the foreleg are white, and the spurs are white dorsally, brown ventrally.

The abdomen is dorsally dark brown with reddish gloss, ventrally shining dark grey. Segments are banded in yellowish white with a broad longitudinal streak. The anal tuft is dark grey dorsally and ventrally and black laterally.

== Etymology ==
The species is named after Isonoe, a moon of Jupiter.
