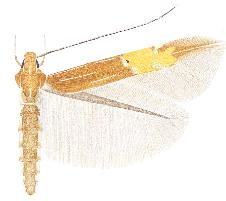

Scientific classification
- Domain: Eukaryota
- Kingdom: Animalia
- Phylum: Arthropoda
- Class: Insecta
- Order: Lepidoptera
- Family: Cosmopterigidae
- Genus: Pebobs
- Species: P. sanctivincenti

Binomial name
- Pebobs sanctivincenti (Walsingham, 1891)

Synonyms
- Cosmopteryx sancti-vincenti Walsingham, 1891; Cosmopterix sanctivincenti

= Pebobs sanctivincenti =

Species of moth

Pebobs sanctivincenti is a moth of the family Cosmopterigidae. It is known from Grenada and Saint Vincent and the Grenadines.

== Description ==
Male, female. Forewing length 3.4-4.2 mm. Head: frons shining ochreous-white with greenish reflection, vertex and neck tufts shining brown with greenish and reddish reflections, laterally and medially lined white, collar shining brown; labial palpus first segment very short, white, second segment three-quarters of the length of third, dark brown with white longitudinal lines laterally and ventrally, third segment white, lined brown laterally, extreme apex white; scape dorsally shining dark brown with a white anterior line, ventrally shining white, antenna shining dark brown with a white line from base to two-thirds, followed towards apex by one white segment, three dark brown, two white, eight dark brown and three white segments at apex. Thorax and tegulae shining brown with reddish gloss, thorax with a white median line in posterior half. Legs: shining greyish brown, femora of midleg and hindleg shining greyish ochreous, foreleg with a white line on tibia and tarsal segments one to three, segment five entirely white, tibia of midleg with white oblique basal and medial lines and a white apical ring, tarsal segment one and two with white apical rings, segment five entirely white, tibia of hindleg with a very oblique white line from base to beyond one half and a white apical ring, tarsal segment one with white basal and ochreous apical ring, segment two with an indistinct ochreous apical ring, segment five entirely whitish, spurs white dorsally, brown ventrally. Forewing shining brown with reddish gloss, five narrow white lines in the basal area, a first subcostal, close to costa, from base to one-quarter, followed by a second subcostal between the end of the first subcostal and the transverse fascia, a medial just above fold from beyond base to one-third, a short, slightly oblique subdorsal from one-quarter almost to the end of the second subcostal, a dorsal from one-eighth to one-quarter, a bright yellow transverse fascia beyond the middle with a broad prolongation towards apex and with a long and narrow apical protrusion to the cilia, bordered at the inner edge by two tubercular pale golden metallic subcostal and dorsal spots, the subcostal spot with a patch of blackish scales on the outside, the dorsal spot further from base, two tubercular pale golden metallic costal and dorsal spots at three-quarters of the transverse fascia, both spots opposite, the costal spot greyish brown edged inwardly, the dorsal spot three times as large as the costal, a white costal streak from the outer costal spot, a narrow shining white apical line in the apical cilia, cilia brown at apex, paler towards dorsum. Hindwing shining dark brownish grey, cilia brown. Underside: forewing shining dark greyish brown with an ochreous costal streak in the apical half, the white apical line indistinctly visible, hindwing shining dark greyish brown. Abdomen dorsally dark olive brown with greenish and reddish reflections, laterally with pale ochreous spots, ventrally shining dark grey, segments banded shining yellowish white posteriorly and with a broad shining yellowish white longitudinal streak, anal tuft ochreous-white, in the female dorsally olive brown with golden gloss, ventrally ochreous.
