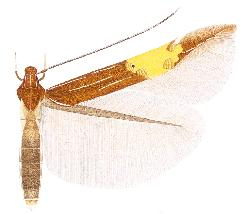

Scientific classification
- Kingdom: Animalia
- Phylum: Arthropoda
- Clade: Pancrustacea
- Class: Insecta
- Order: Lepidoptera
- Family: Cosmopterigidae
- Genus: Pebobs
- Species: P. elara

Binomial name
- Pebobs elara Koster, 2010

= Pebobs elara =

Species of moth

Pebobs elara is a moth of the family Cosmopterigidae. It is known from Cuba and Jamaica.

Adults have been recorded in March and July. It is probably bivoltine.

== Description ==
Male, female. Forewing length 3.4-3.8 mm. Head: frons shining ochreous-white, vertex and neck tufts shining brown, laterally and medially narrowly lined white, collar shining brown; labial palpus first segment very short, white, second segment three-quarters of the length of third, dark brown with white longitudinal lines laterally and ventrally, third segment white, lined brown laterally; scape dorsally shining brown with a white anterior line, ventrally shining white, antenna shining dark brown with a white line from base to two-thirds, followed towards apex by four partly white segments, two white, two dark brown, two white, ten dark brown and about seven white segments at apex. Thorax and tegulae shining brown, thorax with a white median line. Legs: femora shining pale ochreous, foreleg brownish grey with a white line on tibia and tarsal segment one, posterior half of two, anterior half of three and posterior half of four and five, tibia of midleg brown with white oblique basal and medial lines and a white apical ring, tarsal segments ochreous on the outside, greyish brown on the inside, segment one and two with inner apical spots, segment five entirely ochreous white, tibia of hindleg brown with a white very oblique line from base to beyond middle and a white apical ring, tarsal segments brownish grey, segment one with a white basal ring and an ochreous-white apical ring, segments two to five with ochreous white apical rings, spurs white dorsally, brown ventrally. Forewing shining brown, six narrow white lines in the basal area, a first subcostal, close to costa, from base to one-quarter, followed by a second subcostal between the end of the first subcostal and the transverse fascia, a medial just above fold from one-eighth to two-fifths, a short first subdorsal above dorsum near base, a slightly oblique second subdorsal from the middle of the medial almost to the transverse fascia, a dorsal from one-eighth to start of the subdorsal, a bright yellow transverse fascia beyond the middle, narrowed towards dorsum at both edges with a broad irregular prolongation towards apex, bordered at the inner edge by two tubercular pale golden metallic subcostal and dorsal spots, the subcostal spot with a blackish patch on the outside and more towards base, the dorsal spot slightly larger, bordered at the outer edge by two tubercular pale golden metallic costal and dorsal spots, the costal spot brown lined inwardly, the dorsal spot twice as large as the costal and more towards base, a white costal streak from the outer costal spot, a shining white apical line, somewhat irregular in width, cilia brown around apex, lighter towards dorsum. Hindwing shining brownish grey, cilia pale brown. Underside: forewing shining brown with greenish reflection, apically lighter and with a thin ochreous apical line, widening towards apex, hindwing slightly more greyish brown. Abdomen dorsally shining dark greyish brown, basally and apically more ochreous, segment six with a narrow ochreous-white posterior band, laterally ochreous-white, ventrally ochreous-yellow, segments banded shining white posteriorly and a very broad shining white ventral streak from segment one to five, anal tuft yellowish white.

== Etymology ==
The species is named after Elara, a moon of Jupiter. To be treated as a noun in apposition.
