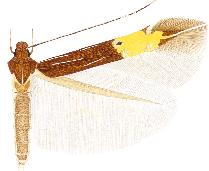

Scientific classification
- Kingdom: Animalia
- Phylum: Arthropoda
- Clade: Pancrustacea
- Class: Insecta
- Order: Lepidoptera
- Family: Cosmopterigidae
- Genus: Pebobs
- Species: P. kale

Binomial name
- Pebobs kale Koster, 2010

= Pebobs kale =

Species of moth

Pebobs kale is a moth of the family Cosmopterigidae. It is known from Peru and Trinidad and Tobago.

Adults have been recorded in March and between June and August.

== Description ==
Male, female. Forewing length 2.9 3.8 mm. Head: frons shining ochreous-white with greenish and reddish reflections, vertex and neck tufts shining bronze brown with greenish and reddish reflections, collar shining bronze brown; labial palpus first segment very short, white, second segment four-fifths of the length of third, dark brown with white longitudinal lines laterally and ventrally, third segment white, lined brown laterally; scape dorsally shining dark brown with a white anterior line, ventrally shining white, antenna shining dark brown, with a white line from base to two-thirds, followed towards apex by six to eight white segments, two dark brown, two white, ten dark brown and about seven white segments at apex. Thorax and tegulae shining bronze brown with reddish reflection, thorax with a white median line. Legs: femora of midleg and hindleg shining pale ochreous, foreleg brownish grey with a white line on tibia and tarsal segments, tibia of midleg brownish grey with white oblique basal and medial streaks and a white apical ring, tarsal segment one and two with an ochreous-white streak, tarsal segment four with a white apical ring, segment five ochreous white, tibia of hindleg brownish grey with a white, very oblique streak from base to beyond middle and a white apical ring, tarsal segment one with whitish basal and apical rings, segments two and three with whitish apical rings, segments four and five entirely whitish, spurs ochreous-white. Forewing shining bronze brown, five narrow white lines in the basal area, a first subcostal from base to one-quarter and slightly bending from costa, a short second subcostal in the middle between the end of the first subcostal and the transverse fascia, a medial from before the middle of the first subcostal to one-third and just above fold, an oblique subdorsal from before the end of the medial to beyond the end of the second subcostal, a short dorsal from beyond base to one-fifth, a light yellow transverse fascia beyond the middle with a broad prolongation towards apex and with a narrow apical protrusion, bordered at the inner edge by two tubercular pale golden metallic subcostal and dorsal spots, the subcostal spot with a patch of blackish scales on the outside and more towards base, two tubercular pale golden metallic costal and dorsal spots at three-quarters of the transverse fascia, both spots opposite, the costal spot lined brown at the inside, the dorsal spot more towards base and twice as large as the costal, a white costal streak from the outer costal spot, a shining white apical line from the apical protrusion of the transverse fascia to apex, cilia bronze brown around apex, paler towards dorsum. Hindwing shining brownish grey, darker grey in the female, cilia pale brown. Underside: forewing shining ochreous-grey with greenish reflection, apically lighter, the apical line visible, hindwing slightly paler than forewing. Abdomen dorsally shining dark greyish brown, segments six and seven each with a narrow ochreous-white posterior band, laterally ochreous-white, ventrally shining white, anal tuft ochreous-white dorsally, white ventrally.

== Etymology ==
The species is named after Kale, a moon of Jupiter. To be treated as a noun in apposition.
