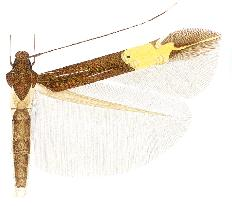

Scientific classification
- Kingdom: Animalia
- Phylum: Arthropoda
- Clade: Pancrustacea
- Class: Insecta
- Order: Lepidoptera
- Family: Cosmopterigidae
- Genus: Pebobs
- Species: P. aitne

Binomial name
- Pebobs aitne Koster, 2010

= Pebobs aitne =

Species of moth

Pebobs aitne is a moth of the family Cosmopterigidae. It is known from Belize and Costa Rica.

Adults have been recorded in April and July, indicating more than one generation.

== Description ==
Male. Forewing length 3.9 mm. Head: frons shining ochreous-white, vertex and neck tufts shining dark brown with greenish and reddish reflections, collar shining dark brown; Labial palpus first segment very short, white, second segment three-quarters of the length of third, dark brown with white longitudinal lines laterally and ventrally, third segment white, lined brown laterally; scape dorsally shining brown with a white anterior line, ventrally shining ochreous-white, antenna shining dark brown with a white line from base to two-thirds, followed towards apex by an annulate section of four segments, two white, two dark brown, two white, ten dark brown and eight white segments at apex. Thorax and tegulae shining dark brown with greenish and reddish reflections. Legs: shining dark greyish brown, foreleg with a white line on tibia and tarsal segments one to three and five, segment four with a white apical ring, tibia of midleg with white oblique basal and medial lines and a white apical ring, tarsal segments one, two and four with white apical rings, segment five entirely white, tibia of hindleg as midleg, tarsal segment one with white basal and apical rings, segment two with a white apical ring, segments three to five with white dorsal lines, spurs ochreous-white dorsally, ochreous-grey ventrally. Forewing shining dark brown with reddish gloss, four very narrow silver white lines in the basal area, a short subcostal from base to one-sixth, slightly bending from costa, a medial from one-sixth to one-third, a subdorsal from one-third to just before one-half, a short and very indistinct dorsal from base, a pale yellow transverse fascia beyond the middle with a prolongation towards apex and with a long and narrow apical protrusion in the middle, bordered at the inner edge by two tubercular pale golden metallic subcostal and subdorsal spots, the subcostal spot more towards base and with a small patch of blackish brown scales on the outside, bordered at the outer edge by two tubercular pale golden metallic costal and dorsal spots, both spots opposite, the costal spot inwardly lined dark brown, the dorsal spot twice as large as the costal, a white costal streak from the outer costal spot, a yellowish apical line from the apical protrusion to apex, cilia dark brown around apex, paler towards dorsum. Hindwing shining pale brownish grey, cilia greyish brown. Underside: forewing shining dark brown, the apical line indistinctly visible, hindwing pale brownish grey. Abdomen dorsally dark greyish brown, ventrally shining white, anal tuft ochreous-white.

== Etymology ==
The species is named after Aitne, a moon of Jupiter. To be treated as a noun in apposition.
