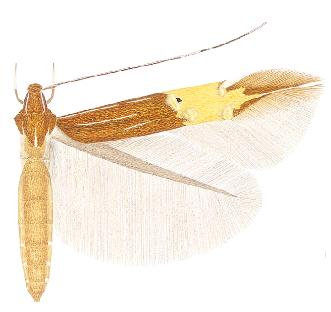

Scientific classification
- Kingdom: Animalia
- Phylum: Arthropoda
- Class: Insecta
- Order: Lepidoptera
- Family: Cosmopterigidae
- Genus: Pebobs
- Species: P. tetragramma

Binomial name
- Pebobs tetragramma (Meyrick, 1915)

Synonyms
- Cosmopteryx tetragramma Meyrick, 1915; Cosmopterix tetragramma

= Pebobs tetragramma =

Species of moth

Pebobs tetragramma is a moth of the family Cosmopterigidae. It is known from Guyana.

Adults have been recorded in November, January, February and April, indicating more than one generation.

== Description ==
Male, female. Forewing length 3.3-3.6 mm. Head: frons shining ochreous-white with greenish reflection, vertex and neck tufts shining greyish brown with reddish gloss, white lateral lines hardly visible or absent, collar shining greyish brown; labial palpus first segment very short, white, second segment three-quarters of the length of third, dark brown with white longitudinal lines laterally and ventrally, third segment white, lined brown laterally, extreme apex white; scape dorsally shining dark brown with a white anterior line, ventrally shining white, antenna shining dark brown with a white line from base to beyond one-half, followed towards apex by six white segments, two dark brown, two white, ten dark brown and seven white segments at apex. Thorax and tegulae shining greyish brown with reddish gloss, thorax with a narrow white median line. Legs: shining dark greyish brown, femora of midleg and hindleg shining ochreous-white, foreleg with a white line on tibia and tarsal segments, tibia of midleg with white oblique basal and medial lines and a white apical ring, tarsal segments one, two and four with white apical rings, tarsal segment five entirely white, tibia of hindleg with a very oblique white line from base to beyond one half and a white apical ring, tarsal segment one with basal and apical white rings, segments two and three with indistinct whitish apical rings, segments four and five entirely whitish, spurs white dorsally, brown ventrally. Forewing shining greyish brown with reddish gloss, five narrow white lines in the basal area, a first subcostal, close to costa, from base to one-quarter, followed by a second subcostal between the end of the first subcostal and the transverse fascia, a medial just above fold from beyond base to one-third, a short, slightly oblique subdorsal from one-quarter almost to the end of the second subcostal, a dorsal from one-eighth to one-quarter, a bright yellow transverse fascia beyond the middle with a broad prolongation towards apex and with a narrow apical protrusion to the middle of the apical area, bordered at the inner edge by two tubercular pale golden metallic subcostal and subdorsal spots, the subcostal spot with a patch of blackish scales on the outside, the subdorsal spot further from base than the subcostal, bordered at the outer edge by two tubercular pale golden costal and dorsal spots, both spots opposite, the dorsal spot twice as large as the costal, a white costal streak, inwardly edged greyish brown, from outer costal spot, a shining white apical line from the apical protrusion to the apical cilia, cilia greyish brown at apex, ochreous-brown towards dorsum. Hindwing shining brownish grey, cilia ochreous-brown. Underside: forewing shining brownish grey, the transverse fascia and the white apical line indistinctly visible, hindwing shining grey. Abdomen dorsally yellowish brown with reddish gloss, ventrally shining dark grey, segments banded shining yellowish white posteriorly and with a broad shining yellowish white longitudinal streak, anal tuft dorsally yellowish brown, ventrally ochreous. Anal tuft in female dark grey.
