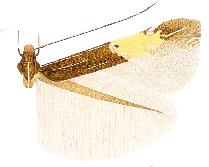

Scientific classification
- Domain: Eukaryota
- Kingdom: Animalia
- Phylum: Arthropoda
- Class: Insecta
- Order: Lepidoptera
- Family: Cosmopterigidae
- Genus: Pebobs
- Species: P. ipomoeae

Binomial name
- Pebobs ipomoeae (Busck, 1900)

Synonyms
- Cosmopteryx ipomoeae Busck, 1900; Cosmopterix ipomoeae; Tanygona ipomoeae

= Pebobs ipomoeae =

Species of moth

Pebobs ipomoeae is a moth of the family Cosmopterigidae. It is known from Florida.

== Description ==
=== Adult ===
Male, female. Forewing length 3.4 3.7 mm. Head: frons shining ochreous-grey with greenish and reddish reflections, vertex shining ochreous-brown with greenish and reddish reflections, neck tufts and collar shining bronze brown with reddish gloss; labial palpus first segment very short, white, second segment four-fifths of the length of third, dark brown with white longitudinal lines laterally and ventrally, third segment white, lined brown laterally; scape dorsally shining dark brown with a white anterior line, ventrally white, antenna shining dark brown, with a white line from base to two-thirds, in distal half more or less interrupted, followed towards apex by two white segments, ten dark brown and seven white segments at apex. Thorax and tegulae shining bronze brown with reddish gloss, thorax, including metathorax, with a white median line. Legs: femora of midleg and hindleg shining ochreous, foreleg brownish grey with a white line on tibia and tarsal segments, tibia of midleg brownish grey with white oblique basal and medial lines and a white apical ring, tarsal segments one, two and four with white apical rings, segment five entirely white, tibia of hindleg ochreous-brown with a white, very oblique line from base to beyond middle and a white apical ring, tarsal segment one with white basal and ochreous apical rings, segments two and three with ochreous apical rings, segments four and five entirely ochreous, spurs ochreous-grey. Forewing shining bronze brown, five narrow white lines in the basal area, a first subcostal, close to costa, from base to one-third, distally very slightly bending from costa, followed by a short second subcostal between the end of first and the transverse fascia, a medial starting just beyond base to just beyond the first subcostal, a subdorsal, starting just before the end of the medial to the end of the second subcostal, a dorsal from beyond base to one-third, a pale yellow transverse fascia beyond the middle, narrowed towards dorsum on the inside with a costal and dorsal prolongation towards apex and with an apical protrusion in the middle to beyond one half of the apical area, bordered at the inner edge by two tubercular pale golden metallic subcostal and dorsal spots, the subcostal spot with a patch of blackish scales on the outside, the dorsal spot further from base than the costal, at three-quarters of transverse fascia two tubercular pale golden metallic costal and dorsal spots, the costal spot lined brown on the inside, the dorsal spot twice as large and slightly more towards base than the costal, a white costal streak from the outer costal spot, a white apical line from the apical protrusion to apex, not in the cilia, cilia bronze brown around apex, paler towards dorsum. Hindwing shining brownish grey, cilia pale brown. Underside: forewing shining greyish brown, distally paler, the apical line visible, hindwing as forewing, but paler in dorsal half. Abdomen not examined, already used for dissection.

=== Larva ===
Length 7 mm, head yellow with dark eyespots and mouth parts, body white with one dorsal and two lateral narrow wine-red longitudinal lines.

== Biology ==
The larvae feed on Ipomoea species. They mine the leaves of their host plant. The mine has the form of a clear, irregular blotch with short silk-lined galleries inside, in which the larva retreats when disturbed. Pupation takes place outside of the mine in an inconspicuous, matted, flat cocoon. Adults have been collected from October to February and in May.
