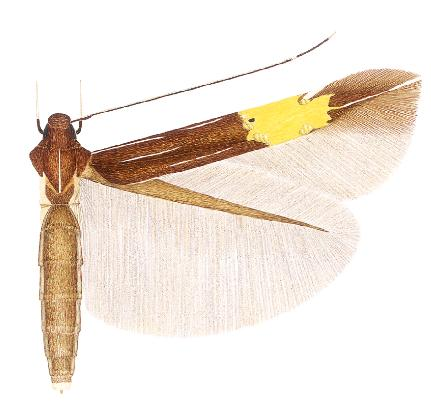
- An undescribed Pebobs species

Scientific classification
- Kingdom: Animalia
- Phylum: Arthropoda
- Clade: Pancrustacea
- Class: Insecta
- Order: Lepidoptera
- Family: Cosmopterigidae
- Genus: Pebobs; Hodges, 1978

Type species
- Cosmopteryx ipomoeae Busck, 1900

Synonyms
- Pebops

= Pebobs =

Genus of moths

Pebobs is a genus of moths in the family Cosmopterigidae.

== Description ==
=== Adult ===
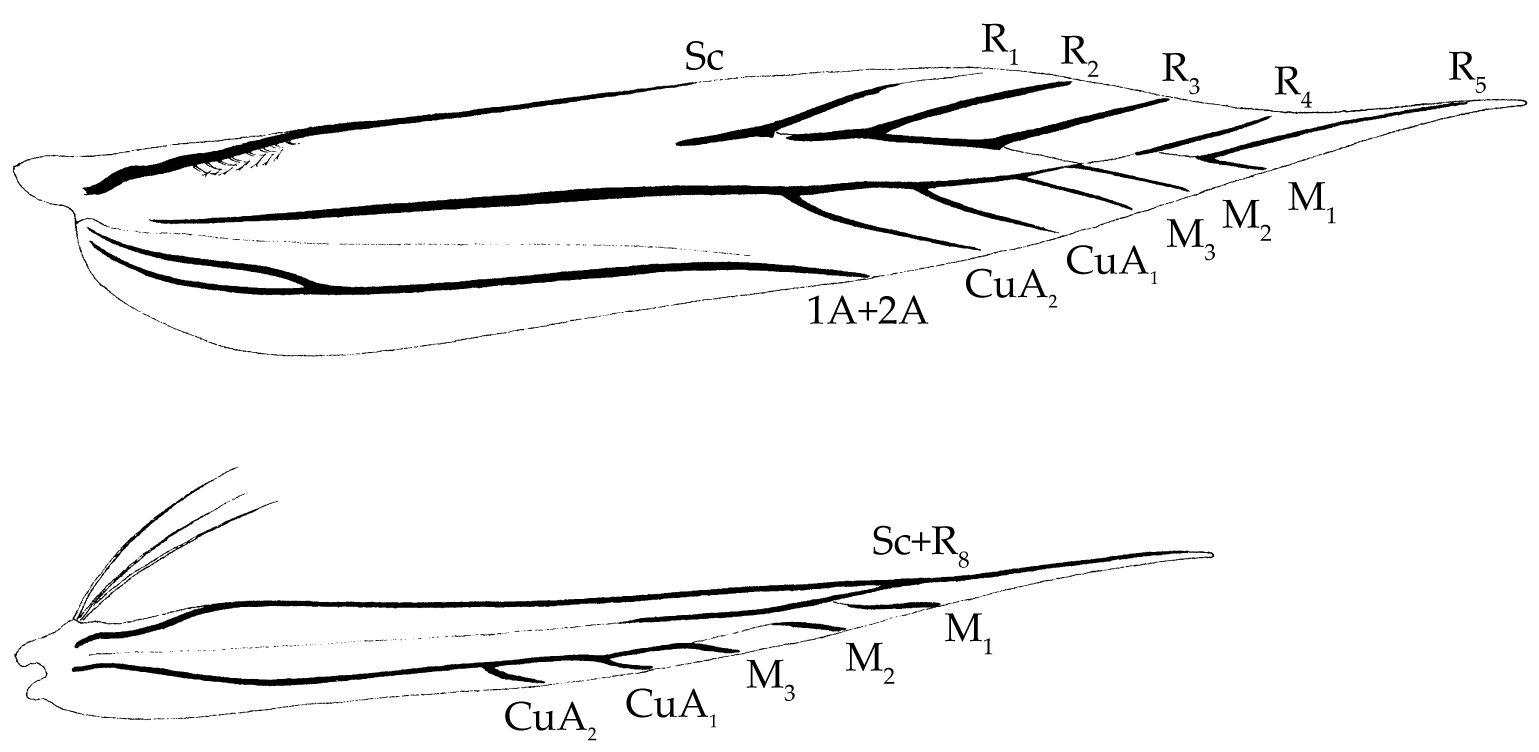
Wing venation of Pebobs ipomoeae

Pebobs species are very small to small moths in the family Cosmopterigidae. Forewing length of 2.9-4.3 mm. The external features are as in Cosmopterix. Wing venation with 12 veins in forewing and 7 veins in hindwing. Forewing with Sc and R1-R5 to costa; R5 stalked with M1; M1-CuA2 to termen; CuP very weak and not reaching termen; 1A+2A with basal fork, to dorsum. Hindwing Sc along costa and joining Rs at three-quarters; M1-CuA2 to termen; veins often not fully developed due to the narrow shape of the hindwing.

== Biology ==
The biology has only been described for Pebobs ipomoeae. The one known life cycle does not differ from those of the known life cycles of Cosmopterix species.

== Species ==
- Pebobs aitne Koster, 2010
- Pebobs elara Koster, 2010
- Pebobs ipomoeae (Busck, 1900)
- Pebobs isonoe Koster, 2010
- Pebobs kale Koster, 2010
- Pebobs sanctivincenti (Walsingham, 1891)
- Pebobs tetragramma (Meyrick, 1915)

=== References ===
As of this edit, this article uses content from "The genera Cosmopterix Hübner and Pebobs Hodges in the New World with special attention to the Neotropical fauna (Lepidoptera: Cosmopterigidae)", which is licensed in a way that permits reuse under the Creative Commons Attribution-ShareAlike 3.0 Unported License, but not under the GFDL. All relevant terms must be followed.
