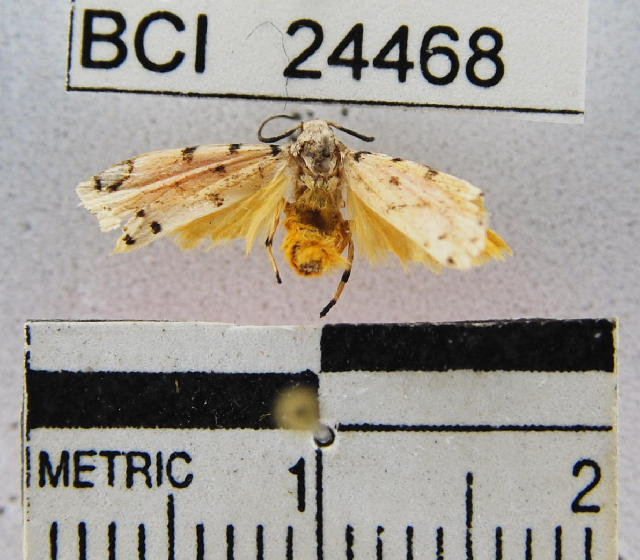

Scientific classification
- Domain: Eukaryota
- Kingdom: Animalia
- Phylum: Arthropoda
- Class: Insecta
- Order: Lepidoptera
- Superfamily: Noctuoidea
- Family: Erebidae
- Subfamily: Arctiinae
- Genus: Epeiromulona
- Species: E. thysanata

Binomial name
- Epeiromulona thysanata Field, 1952

= Epeiromulona thysanata =

Species of moth

Epeiromulona thysanata is a moth of the subfamily Arctiinae. It was described by William D. Field in 1952. It is found in French Guiana, Guyana, Suriname, Costa Rica and Panama.

The length of the forewings is 6-6.5 mm for males and 7 mm for females. The wings are similar to Epeiromulona lephina and Epeiromulona phelina, differing in the fringe of the outer margin of the forewing. In E. thysanata this fringe is orange next to the margin with black scales. The hindwings are also similar to E. phelina and E. lephina, differing in having the fringe of the outer margin fuscous along the apical third of the wing.
