= Epeiromulona hamata =

Scientific classification
- Domain: Eukaryota
- Kingdom: Animalia
- Phylum: Arthropoda
- Class: Insecta
- Order: Lepidoptera
- Superfamily: Noctuoidea
- Family: Erebidae
- Subfamily: Arctiinae
- Genus: Epeiromulona
- Species: E. hamata

Binomial name
- Epeiromulona hamata Field, 1952

Species of moth

Epeiromulona hamata is a moth of the subfamily Arctiinae. It was described by William D. Field in 1952. It is found in Trinidad, northern South America and Brazil.

The length of the forewings is 6.5–8 mm for males and 7.2-8.2 mm for females. The forewings and hindwings are very similar to Epeiromulona phelina and Epeiromulona biloba. There is a variable apical spot on the hindwing, sometimes greatly reduced or absent and sometimes enlarged.

== Subspecies ==
- Epeiromulona hamata hamata (French Guiana, Trinidad)
- Epeiromulona hamata brasiliensis Field, 1952 (Brazil)
- Epeiromulona hamata colombiensis Field, 1952 (Colombia)
- Epeiromulona hamata venezuelensis Field, 1952 (Venezuela)
