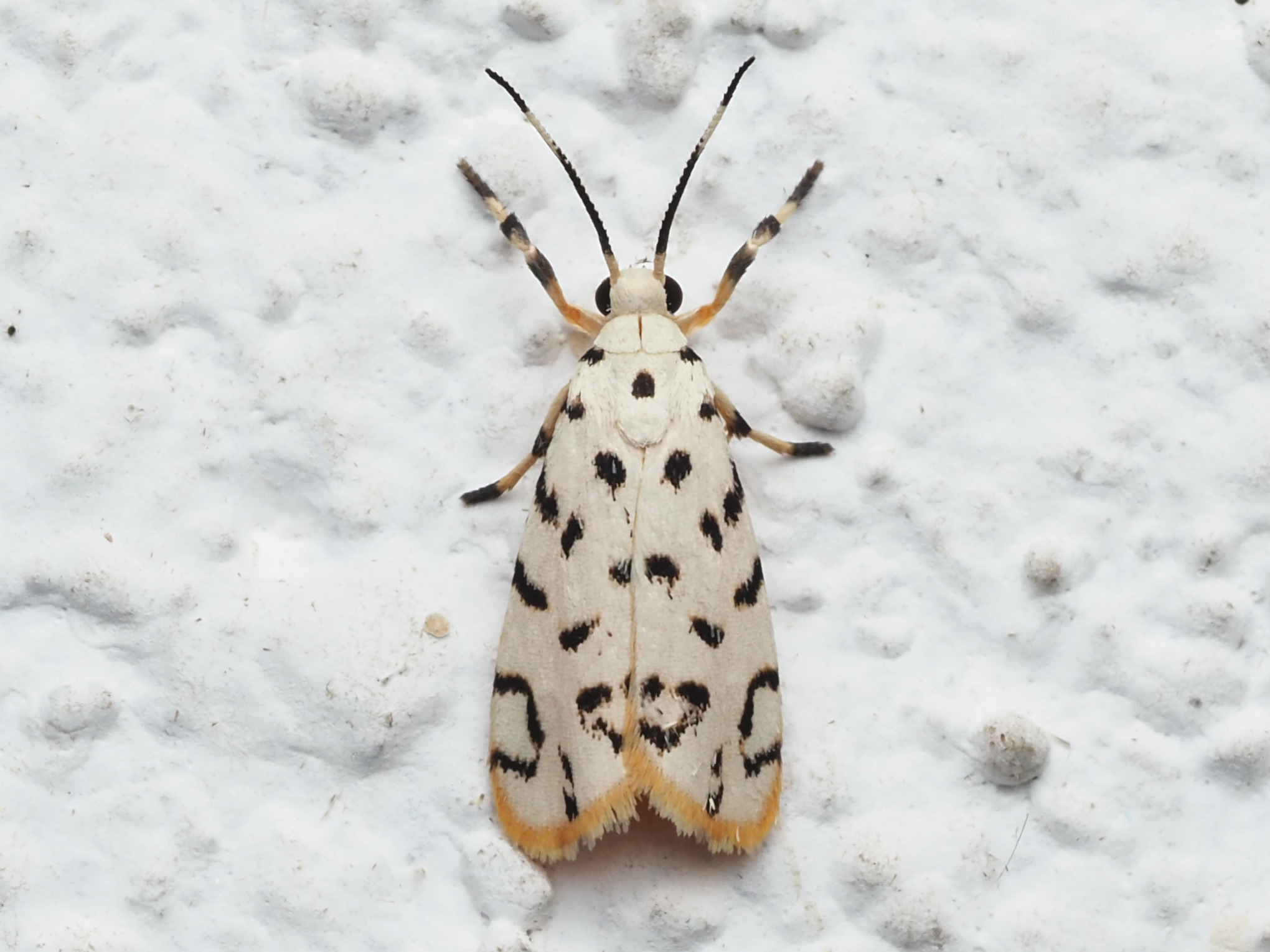
- Epeiromulona roseata in Belize

Scientific classification
- Kingdom: Animalia
- Phylum: Arthropoda
- Clade: Pancrustacea
- Class: Insecta
- Order: Lepidoptera
- Superfamily: Noctuoidea
- Family: Erebidae
- Subfamily: Arctiinae
- Genus: Epeiromulona
- Species: E. roseata

Binomial name
- Epeiromulona roseata Field, 1952

= Epeiromulona roseata =

Species of moth

Epeiromulona roseata is a moth of the subfamily Arctiinae, described by William D. Field in 1952. It is found in Mexico, Honduras, and Costa Rica.

== Description ==
The length of the forewings is 5.5–7 mm. The forewings are very similar to E. phelina. The fringe is pale yellow. The hindwings are salmon-pink, usually without an apical black spot.
