= Epeiromulona icterinus =

Scientific classification
- Domain: Eukaryota
- Kingdom: Animalia
- Phylum: Arthropoda
- Class: Insecta
- Order: Lepidoptera
- Superfamily: Noctuoidea
- Family: Erebidae
- Subfamily: Arctiinae
- Genus: Epeiromulona
- Species: E. icterinus

Binomial name
- Epeiromulona icterinus Field, 1952

Species of moth

Epeiromulona icterinus is a moth of the subfamily Arctiinae. It was described by William D. Field in 1952. It is found in Guatemala and Panama.

The length of the forewings is 7–8 mm. The wings are similar to Epeiromulona lephina, but the black spots on the upperside are slightly more prominent. The hindwings are usually salmon pink, but sometimes pale orange yellow.
