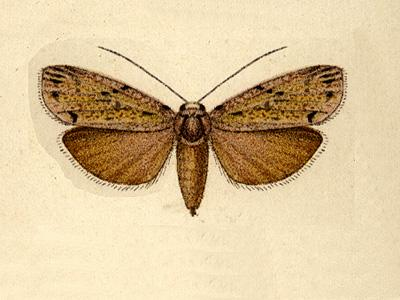
- Mulona grisea

Scientific classification
- Kingdom: Animalia
- Phylum: Arthropoda
- Class: Insecta
- Order: Lepidoptera
- Superfamily: Noctuoidea
- Family: Erebidae
- Subfamily: Arctiinae
- Tribe: Lithosiini
- Genus: Mulona; Walker, 1866

= Mulona =

Genus of moths

Mulona is a genus of moths in the subfamily Arctiinae. The genus was erected by Francis Walker in 1866.

== Species ==
- Mulona barnesi Field, 1952
- Mulona grisea Hampson, 1900
- Mulona lapidaria Walker, 1866
- Mulona manni Field, 1952
- Mulona phelina (Druce, 1885)
- Mulona piperita Reich, 1933
- Mulona schausi Field, 1952
