= Mulona schausi =

Scientific classification
- Kingdom: Animalia
- Phylum: Arthropoda
- Class: Insecta
- Order: Lepidoptera
- Superfamily: Noctuoidea
- Family: Erebidae
- Subfamily: Arctiinae
- Genus: Mulona
- Species: M. schausi

Binomial name
- Mulona schausi Field, 1952

Species of moth

Mulona schausi is a moth of the subfamily Arctiinae first described by William Dewitt Field in 1952. It is found on Cuba.
