= Mulona piperita =

Scientific classification
- Domain: Eukaryota
- Kingdom: Animalia
- Phylum: Arthropoda
- Class: Insecta
- Order: Lepidoptera
- Superfamily: Noctuoidea
- Family: Erebidae
- Subfamily: Arctiinae
- Genus: Mulona
- Species: M. piperita

Binomial name
- Mulona piperita Reich, 1933

Species of moth

Mulona piperita is a moth of the subfamily Arctiinae first described by Reich in 1933. It is found in Brazil.
