= Mulona lapidaria =

Scientific classification
- Kingdom: Animalia
- Phylum: Arthropoda
- Class: Insecta
- Order: Lepidoptera
- Superfamily: Noctuoidea
- Family: Erebidae
- Subfamily: Arctiinae
- Genus: Mulona
- Species: M. lapidaria

Binomial name
- Mulona lapidaria Walker, 1866

Species of insect

Mulona lapidaria is a moth of the subfamily Arctiinae. It was described by Francis Walker in 1866. It is found on Haiti.
