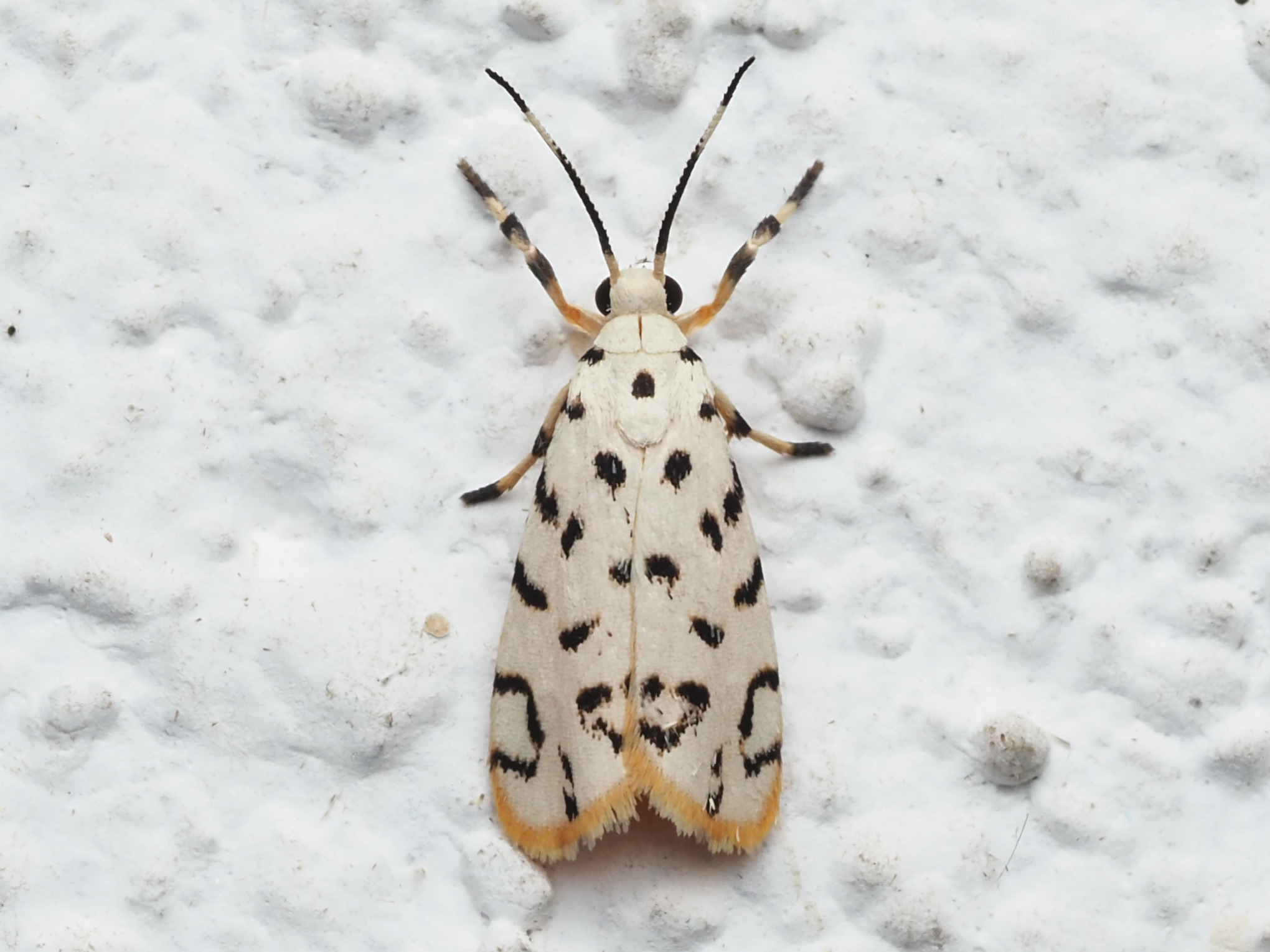
- Epeiromulona roseata in Belize

Scientific classification
- Kingdom: Animalia
- Phylum: Arthropoda
- Clade: Pancrustacea
- Class: Insecta
- Order: Lepidoptera
- Superfamily: Noctuoidea
- Family: Erebidae
- Subfamily: Arctiinae
- Tribe: Lithosiini
- Genus: Epeiromulona; Field, 1952

= Epeiromulona =

Genus of moths

Epeiromulona is a genus of moths in the subfamily Arctiinae.

== Species ==
- Epeiromulona biloba Field, 1952
- Epeiromulona hamata Field, 1952
- Epeiromulona icterinus Field, 1952
- Epeiromulona lephina Field, 1952
- Epeiromulona phelina Druce, 1885
- Epeiromulona roseata Field, 1952
- Epeiromulona thysanata Field, 1952
