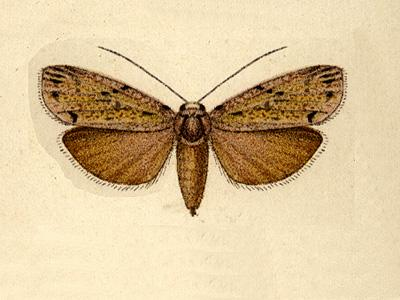

Scientific classification
- Kingdom: Animalia
- Phylum: Arthropoda
- Class: Insecta
- Order: Lepidoptera
- Superfamily: Noctuoidea
- Family: Erebidae
- Subfamily: Arctiinae
- Genus: Mulona
- Species: M. grisea

Binomial name
- Mulona grisea Hampson, 1900

= Mulona grisea =

Species of moth

Mulona grisea is a moth of the subfamily Arctiinae first described by George Hampson in 1900. It is found on Jamaica.
