= Mulona manni =

Scientific classification
- Domain: Eukaryota
- Kingdom: Animalia
- Phylum: Arthropoda
- Class: Insecta
- Order: Lepidoptera
- Superfamily: Noctuoidea
- Family: Erebidae
- Subfamily: Arctiinae
- Genus: Mulona
- Species: M. manni

Binomial name
- Mulona manni Field, 1952

Species of moth

Mulona manni is a moth of the subfamily Arctiinae first described by William Dewitt Field in 1952. It is found on the Bahamas.
