= Epeiromulona lephina =

Scientific classification
- Domain: Eukaryota
- Kingdom: Animalia
- Phylum: Arthropoda
- Class: Insecta
- Order: Lepidoptera
- Superfamily: Noctuoidea
- Family: Erebidae
- Subfamily: Arctiinae
- Genus: Epeiromulona
- Species: E. lephina

Binomial name
- Epeiromulona lephina Field, 1952

Species of moth

Epeiromulona lephina is a moth of the subfamily Arctiinae. It was described by William D. Field in 1952. It is found in Panama and Guatemala.

The length of the forewings is 6.5–7 mm for males and 7–8 mm for females. The forewings and hindwings are similar to Epeiromulona biloba, but the fringe of the forewing is slightly paler orange yellow near the margin.
