= Epeiromulona biloba =

Scientific classification
- Domain: Eukaryota
- Kingdom: Animalia
- Phylum: Arthropoda
- Class: Insecta
- Order: Lepidoptera
- Superfamily: Noctuoidea
- Family: Erebidae
- Subfamily: Arctiinae
- Genus: Epeiromulona
- Species: E. biloba

Binomial name
- Epeiromulona biloba Field, 1952

Species of moth

Epeiromulona biloba is a moth of the subfamily Arctiinae. It was described by William D. Field in 1952. It is found in Panama and Colombia.

The length of the forewings is 6.5–7 mm (0.26–0.28 in). The forewings are white with 15 small black spots and bars. The hindwings, including fringe are pale orange yellow with an apical black spot on the costal margin at the apex.
