= Epeiromulona phelina =

Scientific classification
- Domain: Eukaryota
- Kingdom: Animalia
- Phylum: Arthropoda
- Class: Insecta
- Order: Lepidoptera
- Superfamily: Noctuoidea
- Family: Erebidae
- Subfamily: Arctiinae
- Genus: Epeiromulona
- Species: E. phelina

Binomial name
- Epeiromulona phelina (Druce, 1885)

Synonyms
- Autoceras phelina Druce, 1885; Melania phelina; Cincia phelina; Mulona phelina

Species of moth

Epeiromulona phelina is a moth of the subfamily Arctiinae. It was described by Druce in 1885. It is found in Panama.

The length of the forewings is 9 mm. The wings are white, spotted with 15 black spots and bars. The fringe of the forewing is pale yellowish orange.
