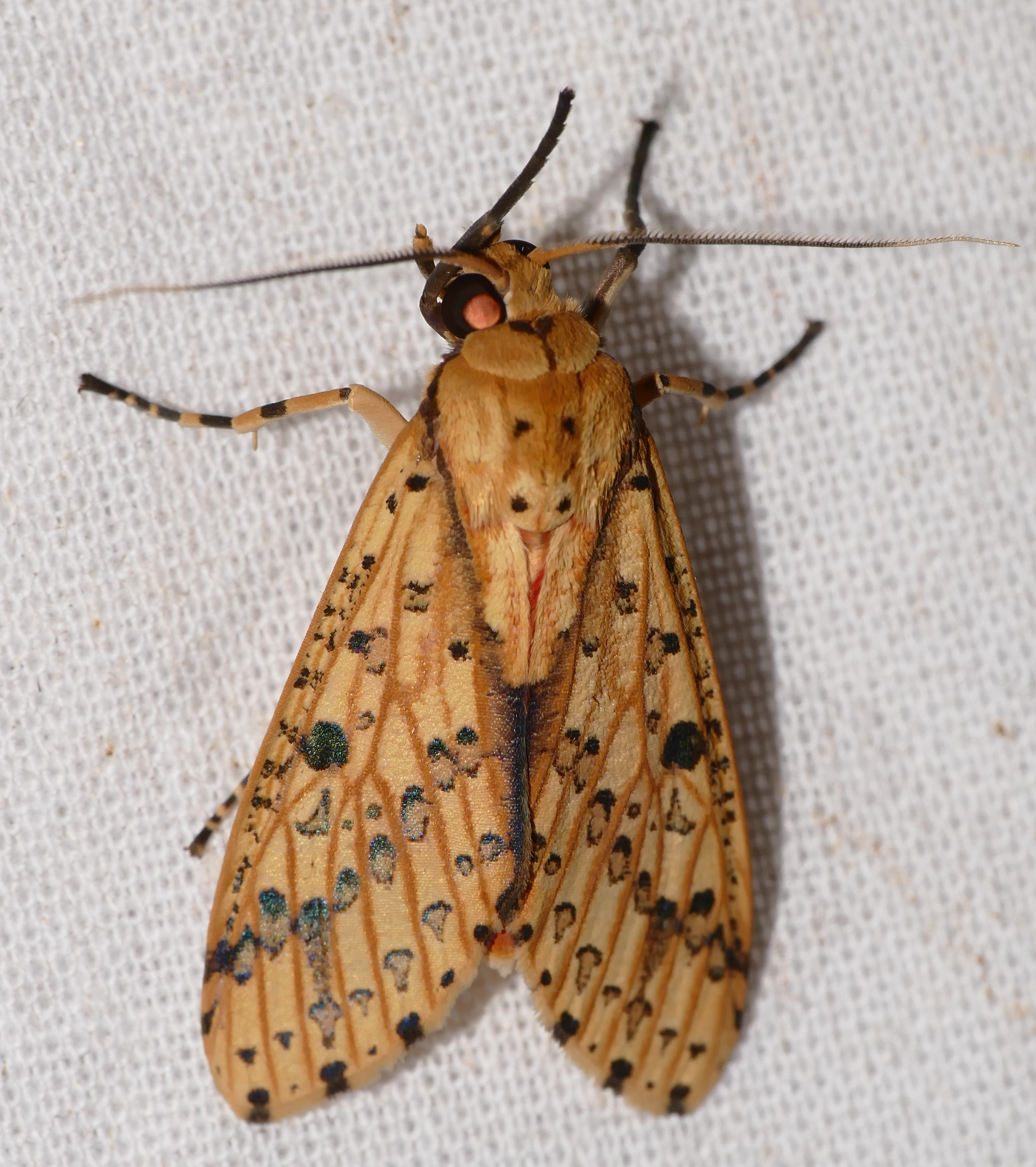

Scientific classification
- Domain: Eukaryota
- Kingdom: Animalia
- Phylum: Arthropoda
- Class: Insecta
- Order: Lepidoptera
- Superfamily: Noctuoidea
- Family: Erebidae
- Subfamily: Arctiinae
- Genus: Haemaphlebiella
- Species: H. strigata

Binomial name
- Haemaphlebiella strigata (E. D. Jones, 1914)

Synonyms
- Haemaphlebia strigata E. D. Jones, 1914

= Haemaphlebiella strigata =

Species of moth

Haemaphlebiella strigata is a species of moth in the family Erebidae. It was described by E. Dukinfield Jones in 1914. It is found in French Guiana and Brazil.
