= Haemaphlebiella formona =

Scientific classification
- Domain: Eukaryota
- Kingdom: Animalia
- Phylum: Arthropoda
- Class: Insecta
- Order: Lepidoptera
- Superfamily: Noctuoidea
- Family: Erebidae
- Subfamily: Arctiinae
- Genus: Haemaphlebiella
- Species: H. formona

Binomial name
- Haemaphlebiella formona (Schaus, 1905)

Synonyms
- Automolis formona Schaus, 1905; Automolis formana Rothschild, 1910; Haemaphlebiella formana

Species of moth

Haemaphlebiella formona is a moth of the family Erebidae. It was described by William Schaus in 1905. It is found in French Guiana, Guyana, Amazonas and on Cuba.
