= Haemaphlebiella venata =

Scientific classification
- Domain: Eukaryota
- Kingdom: Animalia
- Phylum: Arthropoda
- Class: Insecta
- Order: Lepidoptera
- Superfamily: Noctuoidea
- Family: Erebidae
- Subfamily: Arctiinae
- Genus: Haemaphlebiella
- Species: H. venata

Binomial name
- Haemaphlebiella venata (Rothschild, 1909)

Synonyms
- Baritius venata Rothschild, 1909

Species of moth

Haemaphlebiella venata is a moth of the family Erebidae. It was described by Walter Rothschild in 1909. It is found in Suriname and Upper Amazonas.
