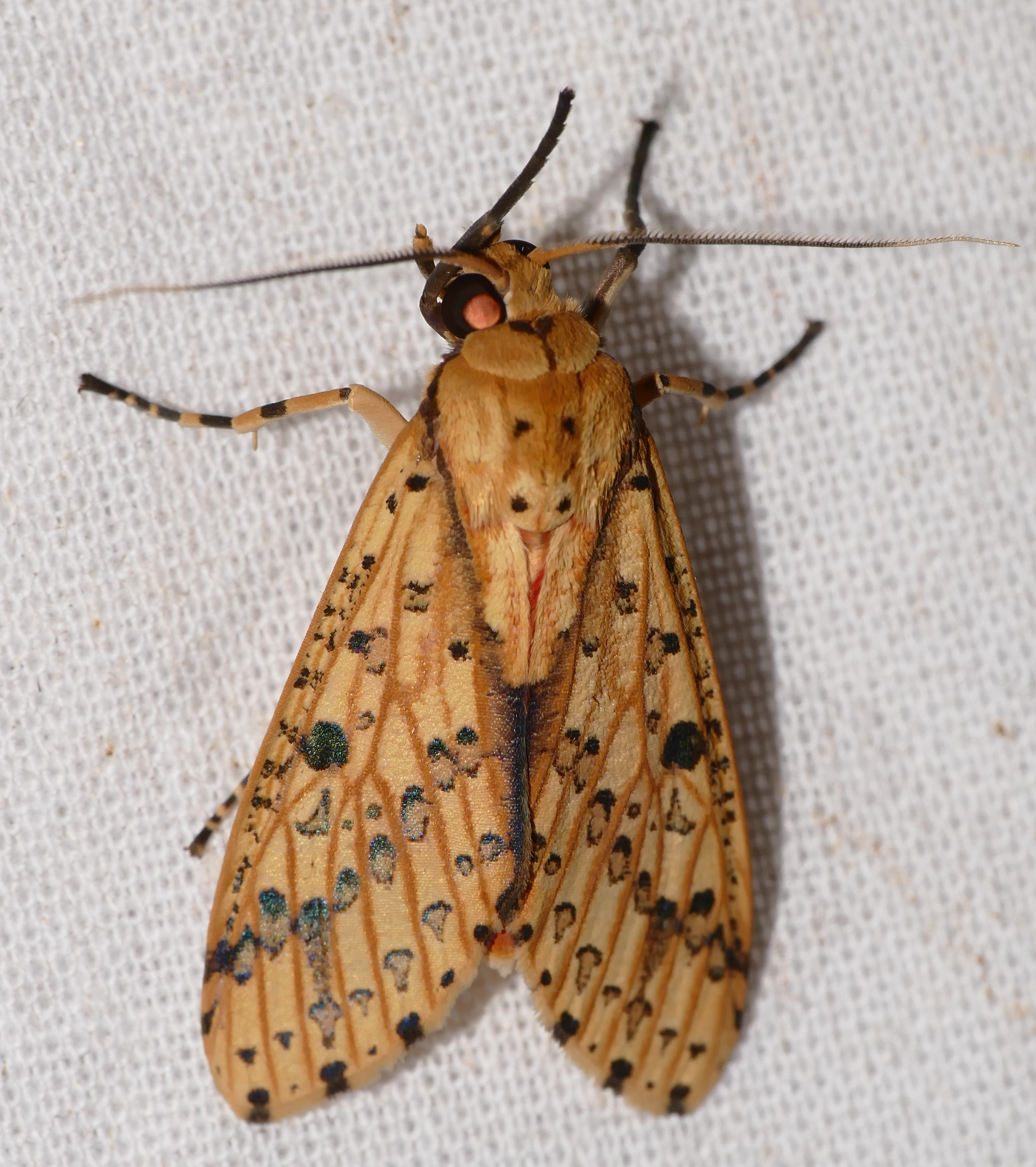
- Haemaphlebiella strigata

Scientific classification
- Domain: Eukaryota
- Kingdom: Animalia
- Phylum: Arthropoda
- Class: Insecta
- Order: Lepidoptera
- Superfamily: Noctuoidea
- Family: Erebidae
- Subfamily: Arctiinae
- Subtribe: Phaegopterina
- Genus: Haemaphlebiella; Collins, 1962

Type species
- Baritius venata Rothschild, 1909

Synonyms
- Haemaphlebia Hampson, 1911 (preocc. Haemaphlebia Hampson, 1910)

= Haemaphlebiella =

Genus of moths

Haemaphlebiella is a genus of moths in the family Erebidae. The genus was described by R. J. Collins in 1962.

Members of this genus are found in the northern part of South America.

== Species ==
- Haemaphlebiella beyerae Laguerre, 2021
- Haemaphlebiella brehmi Laguerre, 2021
- Haemaphlebiella chrysophlebia Laguerre, 2021
- Haemaphlebiella formona (Schaus, 1905)
- Haemaphlebiella melastigma Laguerre, 2021
- Haemaphlebiella strigata (E. D. Jones, 1914)
- Haemaphlebiella venata (Rothschild, 1909)
