= Pseudaclytia popayanum =

Scientific classification
- Domain: Eukaryota
- Kingdom: Animalia
- Phylum: Arthropoda
- Class: Insecta
- Order: Lepidoptera
- Superfamily: Noctuoidea
- Family: Erebidae
- Subfamily: Arctiinae
- Genus: Pseudaclytia
- Species: P. popayanum

Binomial name
- Pseudaclytia popayanum (Dognin, 1902)

Synonyms
- Eucereon popayanum Dognin, 1902

Species of moth

Pseudaclytia popayanum is a moth in the subfamily Arctiinae. It was described by Paul Dognin in 1902. It is found in Colombia.
