= Pseudaclytia major =

Scientific classification
- Domain: Eukaryota
- Kingdom: Animalia
- Phylum: Arthropoda
- Class: Insecta
- Order: Lepidoptera
- Superfamily: Noctuoidea
- Family: Erebidae
- Subfamily: Arctiinae
- Genus: Pseudaclytia
- Species: P. major

Binomial name
- Pseudaclytia major H. Druce, 1906

Species of moth

Pseudaclytia major is a moth in the subfamily Arctiinae. It was described by Herbert Druce in 1906. It is found in Peru.
