= Pseudaclytia pseudodelphire =

Scientific classification
- Domain: Eukaryota
- Kingdom: Animalia
- Phylum: Arthropoda
- Class: Insecta
- Order: Lepidoptera
- Superfamily: Noctuoidea
- Family: Erebidae
- Subfamily: Arctiinae
- Genus: Pseudaclytia
- Species: P. pseudodelphire

Binomial name
- Pseudaclytia pseudodelphire (Rothschild, 1912)

Synonyms
- Agyrta pseudodelphire Rothschild, 1912

Species of moth

Pseudaclytia pseudodelphire is a moth in the subfamily Arctiinae. It was described by Rothschild in 1912. It is found in Venezuela.

The length of the forewings is 18–20 mm. The forewings are purple-brown, the basal half of the subcostal nervure white and with a white oblique band at the apex of the cell. The hindwings are sooty black, strongly glossed with blue.
