= Pseudaclytia opponens =

Scientific classification
- Kingdom: Animalia
- Phylum: Arthropoda
- Class: Insecta
- Order: Lepidoptera
- Superfamily: Noctuoidea
- Family: Erebidae
- Subfamily: Arctiinae
- Genus: Pseudaclytia
- Species: P. opponens

Binomial name
- Pseudaclytia opponens (Walker, 1864)

Synonyms
- Pampa opponens Walker, [1865]; Charidea rufogularis Möschler, 1872

Species of moth

Pseudaclytia opponens is a moth in the subfamily Arctiinae. It was described by Francis Walker in 1864. It is found in Tefé, Brazil.
