= Pseudaclytia bambusana =

Scientific classification
- Kingdom: Animalia
- Phylum: Arthropoda
- Class: Insecta
- Order: Lepidoptera
- Superfamily: Noctuoidea
- Family: Erebidae
- Subfamily: Arctiinae
- Genus: Pseudaclytia
- Species: P. bambusana

Binomial name
- Pseudaclytia bambusana Schaus, 1938

Species of moth

Pseudaclytia bambusana is a moth in the subfamily Arctiinae. It was described by William Schaus in 1938. It is found on Cuba.
