= Pseudaclytia =

Scientific classification
- Domain: Eukaryota
- Kingdom: Animalia
- Phylum: Arthropoda
- Class: Insecta
- Order: Lepidoptera
- Superfamily: Noctuoidea
- Family: Erebidae
- Subfamily: Arctiinae
- Genus: Pseudaclytia; Butler, 1876

Genus of moths

Pseudaclytia is a genus of moths in the subfamily Arctiinae. The genus was erected by Arthur Gardiner Butler in 1876.

== Species ==
- Pseudaclytia bambusana Schaus, 1938
- Pseudaclytia major Druce, 1906
- Pseudaclytia minor Schaus, 1905
- Pseudaclytia opponens Walker, 1864
- Pseudaclytia popayanum Dognin, 1902
- Pseudaclytia pseudodelphire Rothschild, 1912
- Pseudaclytia umbrica Druce, 1898
- Pseudaclytia unimacula Schaus, 1905
