= Pseudaclytia umbrica =

Scientific classification
- Domain: Eukaryota
- Kingdom: Animalia
- Phylum: Arthropoda
- Class: Insecta
- Order: Lepidoptera
- Superfamily: Noctuoidea
- Family: Erebidae
- Subfamily: Arctiinae
- Genus: Pseudaclytia
- Species: P. umbrica

Binomial name
- Pseudaclytia umbrica H. Druce, 1898

Species of moth

Pseudaclytia umbrica is a moth in the subfamily Arctiinae. It was described by Herbert Druce in 1898. It is found in Brazil.
