= Paramulona albulata =

Scientific classification
- Kingdom: Animalia
- Phylum: Arthropoda
- Class: Insecta
- Order: Lepidoptera
- Superfamily: Noctuoidea
- Family: Erebidae
- Subfamily: Arctiinae
- Genus: Paramulona
- Species: P. albulata

Binomial name
- Paramulona albulata (Herrich-Schäffer, 1866)

Synonyms
- Mieza albulata Herrich-Schäffer, 1866

Species of moth

Paramulona albulata is a moth in the subfamily Arctiinae first described by Gottlieb August Wilhelm Herrich-Schäffer in 1866. It is found on Cuba. There is also a record from Puerto Rico, but this is probably a misidentification.

The length of the forewings is 8–12 mm for males and 10–13 mm for females. The forewings are fuscous with fuscous patches. The forewings of the females are darker and more suffused with fuscous. Furthermore, the separate fuscous patches are not so distinct.
