= Paramulona nephelistis =

Scientific classification
- Kingdom: Animalia
- Phylum: Arthropoda
- Class: Insecta
- Order: Lepidoptera
- Superfamily: Noctuoidea
- Family: Erebidae
- Subfamily: Arctiinae
- Genus: Paramulona
- Species: P. nephelistis

Binomial name
- Paramulona nephelistis (Hampson, 1905)

Synonyms
- Cincia nephelistis Hampson, 1905

Species of moth

Paramulona nephelistis is a moth of the subfamily Arctiinae first described by George Hampson in 1905. It is found on Cuba.
