= Paramulona baracoa =

Scientific classification
- Kingdom: Animalia
- Phylum: Arthropoda
- Class: Insecta
- Order: Lepidoptera
- Superfamily: Noctuoidea
- Family: Erebidae
- Subfamily: Arctiinae
- Genus: Paramulona
- Species: P. baracoa

Binomial name
- Paramulona baracoa Field, 1951

Species of moth

Paramulona baracoa is a moth of the subfamily Arctiinae first described by William Dewitt Field in 1951. It is found on Cuba.
