= Seripha =

Scientific classification
- Kingdom: Animalia
- Phylum: Arthropoda
- Class: Insecta
- Order: Lepidoptera
- Superfamily: Noctuoidea
- Family: Erebidae
- Subfamily: Arctiinae
- Tribe: Lithosiini
- Genus: Seripha; Walker, 1854

Synonyms
- Colletria Felder & Rogenhofer, 1875; Colletria Nolken & Zeller, 1876

Genus of moths

Seripha is a genus of moths in the subfamily Arctiinae. The genus was erected by Francis Walker in 1854.

== Species ==
- Seripha coelicolor Walker, 1854
- Seripha plumbiola Hampson, 1909
- Seripha pyrrhocrocis Felder, 1875
