= Seripha plumbiola =

Scientific classification
- Kingdom: Animalia
- Phylum: Arthropoda
- Class: Insecta
- Order: Lepidoptera
- Superfamily: Noctuoidea
- Family: Erebidae
- Subfamily: Arctiinae
- Genus: Seripha
- Species: S. plumbiola

Binomial name
- Seripha plumbiola Hampson, 1909

Species of moth

Seripha plumbiola is a moth in the subfamily Arctiinae. It was described by George Hampson in 1909. It is found on Cuba.
