= Seripha pyrrhocrocis =

Scientific classification
- Domain: Eukaryota
- Kingdom: Animalia
- Phylum: Arthropoda
- Class: Insecta
- Order: Lepidoptera
- Superfamily: Noctuoidea
- Family: Erebidae
- Subfamily: Arctiinae
- Genus: Seripha
- Species: S. pyrrhocrocis

Binomial name
- Seripha pyrrhocrocis (Felder & Rogenhofer, 1875)

Synonyms
- Colletria pyrrhocrocis Felder & Rogenhofer, 1875

Species of moth

Seripha pyrrhocrocis is a moth in the subfamily Arctiinae. It was described by Felder and Rogenhofer in 1875. It is found in Colombia.
