= Seripha coelicolor =

Scientific classification
- Kingdom: Animalia
- Phylum: Arthropoda
- Clade: Pancrustacea
- Class: Insecta
- Order: Lepidoptera
- Superfamily: Noctuoidea
- Family: Erebidae
- Subfamily: Arctiinae
- Genus: Seripha
- Species: S. coelicolor

Binomial name
- Seripha coelicolor Walker, 1854

Species of moth

Seripha coelicolor is a moth in the subfamily Arctiinae. It was described by Francis Walker in 1854. It is found in Venezuela.
