= Burtia rubella =

Scientific classification
- Kingdom: Animalia
- Phylum: Arthropoda
- Class: Insecta
- Order: Lepidoptera
- Superfamily: Noctuoidea
- Family: Erebidae
- Subfamily: Arctiinae
- Genus: Burtia
- Species: B. rubella

Binomial name
- Burtia rubella Grote, 1866

Species of moth

Burtia rubella is a moth in the subfamily of Arctiinae which was first described by Augustus Radcliffe Grote in 1866. It is found in Cuba.
