= Burtia =

Scientific classification
- Domain: Eukaryota
- Kingdom: Animalia
- Phylum: Arthropoda
- Class: Insecta
- Order: Lepidoptera
- Superfamily: Noctuoidea
- Family: Erebidae
- Subfamily: Arctiinae
- Genus: Burtia; Grote, 1866

Synonyms
- Gundlachia Herrich-Schaffer, 1866

Genus of moths

Burtia is a genus of moths in the subfamily Arctiinae. The genus was erected by Augustus Radcliffe Grote in 1866.

== Species ==
- Burtia cruenta (Herrich-Schäffer, 1866) Cuba
- Burtia rubella Grote, 1866 Cuba
- Burtia rubridiscalis (Gaede, 1926) Jamaica
