= Burtia cruenta =

Scientific classification
- Kingdom: Animalia
- Phylum: Arthropoda
- Class: Insecta
- Order: Lepidoptera
- Superfamily: Noctuoidea
- Family: Erebidae
- Subfamily: Arctiinae
- Genus: Burtia
- Species: B. cruenta

Binomial name
- Burtia cruenta (Herrich-Schäffer, 1866)

Synonyms
- Gundlachia cruenta Herrich-Schäffer, 1866

Species of moth

Burtia cruenta is a moth in the subfamily Arctiinae first described by Gottlieb August Wilhelm Herrich-Schäffer in 1866. It is found on Cuba.
