= Mydromera carmina =

Scientific classification
- Kingdom: Animalia
- Phylum: Arthropoda
- Clade: Pancrustacea
- Class: Insecta
- Order: Lepidoptera
- Superfamily: Noctuoidea
- Family: Erebidae
- Subfamily: Arctiinae
- Genus: Mydromera
- Species: M. carmina

Binomial name
- Mydromera carmina Schaus, 1938

Species of moth

Mydromera carmina is a moth of the subfamily Arctiinae. It was described by Schaus in 1938. It is found on Cuba.
