= Mydromera =

Scientific classification
- Kingdom: Animalia
- Phylum: Arthropoda
- Class: Insecta
- Order: Lepidoptera
- Superfamily: Noctuoidea
- Family: Erebidae
- Subfamily: Arctiinae
- Genus: Mydromera; Butler, 1876

Genus of moths

Mydromera is a genus of moths in the subfamily Arctiinae erected by Arthur Gardiner Butler in 1876.

== Species ==
- Mydromera carmina Schaus, 1938
- Mydromera notochloris (Boisduval, 1870)
