= Mydromera notochloris =

Scientific classification
- Kingdom: Animalia
- Phylum: Arthropoda
- Clade: Pancrustacea
- Class: Insecta
- Order: Lepidoptera
- Superfamily: Noctuoidea
- Family: Erebidae
- Subfamily: Arctiinae
- Genus: Mydromera
- Species: M. notochloris

Binomial name
- Mydromera notochloris (Boisduval, 1870)

Synonyms
- Evagra notochloris Boisduval, 1870; Euagra isthmia Felder, 1874; Agyrta nolckeni Staudinger, 1876

Species of moth

Mydromera notochloris is a moth of the subfamily Arctiinae. It was described by Jean Baptiste Boisduval in 1870. It is found in Costa Rica, Guatemala, Honduras, Nicaragua and Colombia.
