= Gonodonta sphenostigma =

Scientific classification
- Kingdom: Animalia
- Phylum: Arthropoda
- Clade: Pancrustacea
- Class: Insecta
- Order: Lepidoptera
- Superfamily: Noctuoidea
- Family: Erebidae
- Genus: Gonodonta
- Species: G. sphenostigma

Binomial name
- Gonodonta sphenostigma Todd, 1973

Species of moth

Gonodonta sphenostigma is a species of fruit-piercing moth in the family Erebidae. It is found in French Guiana.

== Description ==
Individuals of this species have a wingspan between 18 and 19 milimeters. They typically have reddish-brown scales on the frons and a triangular patch of dark brown or black scales on the vertex, with the rest of the body primarily covered in grayish-brown scales. The forewing is of various shades of brown, gray brown, or yellow brown, while the hindwing is distinguished by an orange spot in the center against a background of gray brown. These attributes are considered to be very distinctive within the genus, making identification of Gonodanta sphenostigma comparatively simple.

== Taxonomy ==
Gonodonta sphenostigma is thought to be most closely related to Gonodonta lincus.

== Ecology ==
Gonodonta sphenostigma has an unknown food plant, but pupal cocoons have been observed to be attached to and covered with leaves of Legume.
