= Leioproctus clivifrons =

Scientific classification
- Kingdom: Animalia
- Phylum: Arthropoda
- Clade: Pancrustacea
- Class: Insecta
- Order: Hymenoptera
- Family: Colletidae
- Genus: Leioproctus
- Species: L. clivifrons

Binomial name
- Leioproctus clivifrons Batley, 2025

Species of bee

Leioproctus clivifrons, or Leioproctus (Euryglossidia) clivifrons, is a species of bee in the family Colletidae and subfamily Colletinae. It is endemic to Australia. It was described by entomologist Michael Batley in 2025.

== Etymology ==
The specific epithet clivifrons (Latin: "sloping forehead") is an anatomical reference to the male frons.

== Description ==
The male body length is 8.5 mm, female body length 8.5 mm. Integumental colouration is mainly black and dark brown. The hair is white and brown.

== Distribution and habitat ==
The species occurs in south-west Western Australia. The type locality is Wubin, in the northern Wheatbelt region.

== Behaviour ==
The adults are flying mellivores.
