= Gonodonta aeratilinea =

Scientific classification
- Kingdom: Animalia
- Phylum: Arthropoda
- Clade: Pancrustacea
- Class: Insecta
- Order: Lepidoptera
- Superfamily: Noctuoidea
- Family: Erebidae
- Genus: Gonodonta
- Species: G. aeratilinea

Binomial name
- Gonodonta aeratilinea Todd, 1973

Species of moth

Gonodonta aeratilinea is a species of fruit-piercing moth in the family Erebidae. It is found in Peru.

== Description ==
Individuals of this species have a measured wingspan of 18 millimeters, but this measurement comes from a single female specimen and does not necessarily represent a population average. They typically have a white frons with reddish-brown scales on the vertex, with the rest of the body primarily covered in reddish-brown and white scales. The forewing is dark reddish-brown, while the hindwing is distinguished by an orange spot in the center against a background of dark brown. The undersides of both sets of wings are uniformly dark brown with dark gray-brown-yellow fringe.
