= Gonodontodes dispar =

Scientific classification
- Kingdom: Animalia
- Phylum: Arthropoda
- Class: Insecta
- Order: Lepidoptera
- Superfamily: Noctuoidea
- Family: Erebidae
- Subfamily: Calpinae
- Tribe: Calpini
- Genus: Gonodontodes
- Species: G. dispar

Binomial name
- Gonodontodes dispar Hampson, 1913

Species of moth

Gonodontodes dispar is a moth of the family Noctuidae. It is found on Cuba. An adult male of this species was collected in Key Largo, Florida, in 2009.
