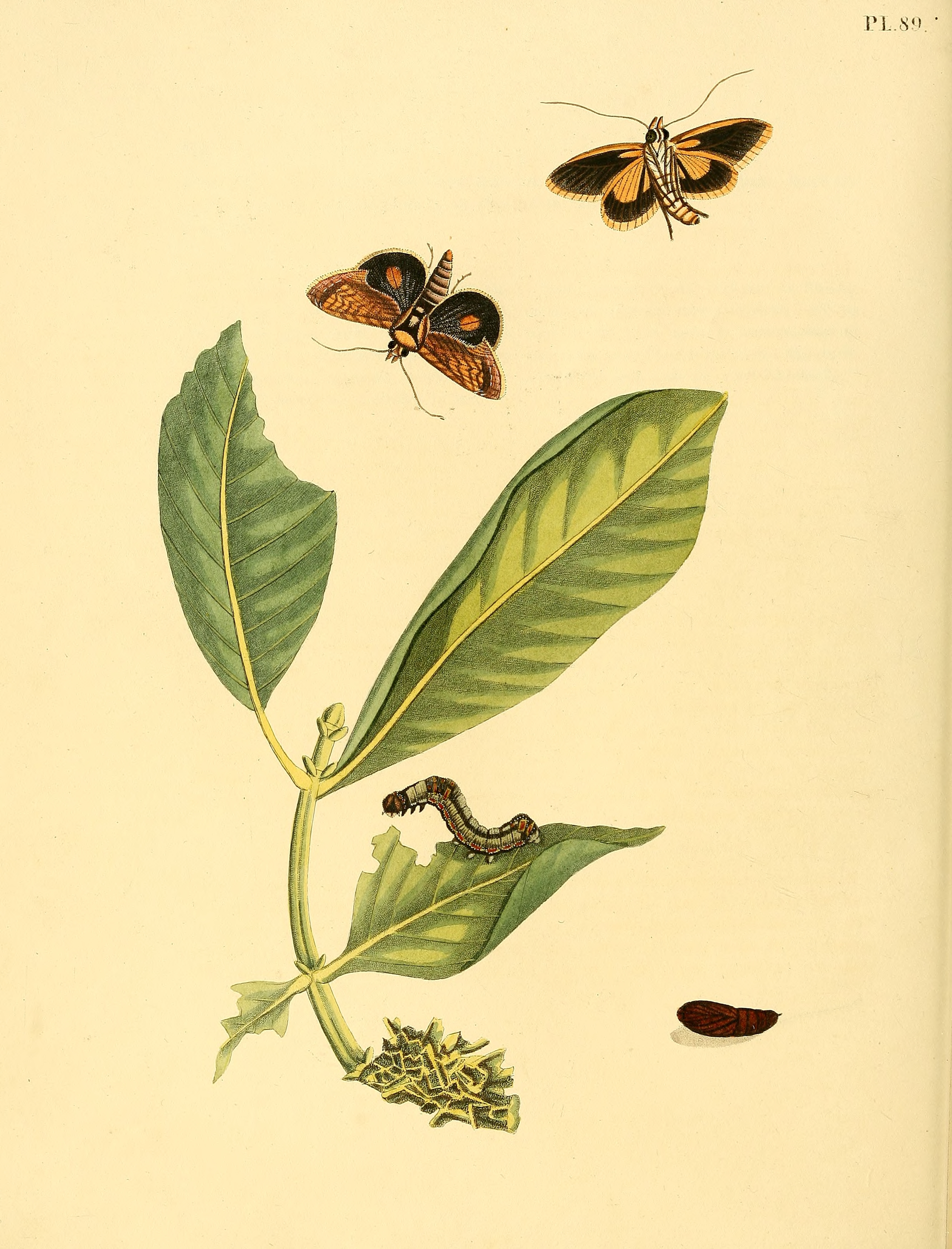
- Illustration of: Gonodonta incurva (as syn. Phalaena incurva)

Scientific classification
- Kingdom: Animalia
- Phylum: Arthropoda
- Clade: Pancrustacea
- Class: Insecta
- Order: Lepidoptera
- Superfamily: Noctuoidea
- Family: Erebidae
- Tribe: Calpini
- Genus: Gonodonta
- Species: G. incurva

Binomial name
- Gonodonta incurva (Sepp, 1840)

= Gonodonta incurva =

Species of moth

Gonodonta incurva is a species of fruit-piercing moth in the family Erebidae. It is found in North America.

The MONA or Hodges number for Gonodonta incurva is 8542.
