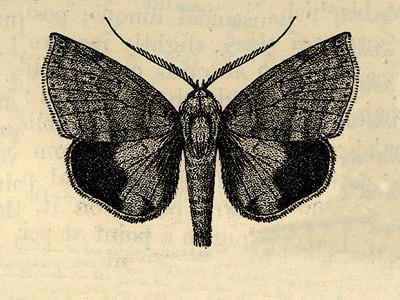
- Gonodontodes chionosticta

Scientific classification
- Kingdom: Animalia
- Phylum: Arthropoda
- Class: Insecta
- Order: Lepidoptera
- Superfamily: Noctuoidea
- Family: Erebidae
- Tribe: Calpini
- Genus: Gonodontodes; Hampson, 1913

= Gonodontodes =

Genus of moths

Gonodontodes is a genus of moths of the family Noctuidae, found in Florida and the Caribbean.

== Species ==
- Gonodontodes chionosticta Hampson, 1913
- Gonodontodes dispar Hampson, 1913
