= Gonodonta unica =

Scientific classification
- Kingdom: Animalia
- Phylum: Arthropoda
- Clade: Pancrustacea
- Class: Insecta
- Order: Lepidoptera
- Superfamily: Noctuoidea
- Family: Erebidae
- Tribe: Calpini
- Genus: Gonodonta
- Species: G. unica

Binomial name
- Gonodonta unica Neumögen, 1891

Species of moth

Gonodonta unica, the unica citrus moth, is a species of fruit-piercing moth in the family Erebidae. It is found in North America.
