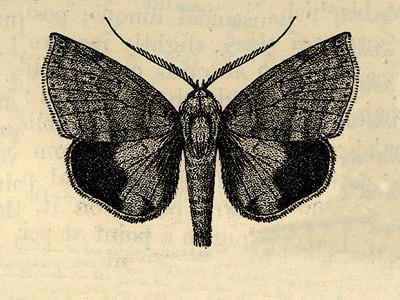

Scientific classification
- Kingdom: Animalia
- Phylum: Arthropoda
- Class: Insecta
- Order: Lepidoptera
- Superfamily: Noctuoidea
- Family: Erebidae
- Subfamily: Calpinae
- Tribe: Calpini
- Genus: Gonodontodes
- Species: G. chionosticta

Binomial name
- Gonodontodes chionosticta Hampson, 1913

= Gonodontodes chionosticta =

Species of moth

Gonodontodes chionosticta is a moth of the family Noctuidae first described by George Hampson in 1913. It is found on Jamaica.
