= Gonodonta pulverea =

Scientific classification
- Kingdom: Animalia
- Phylum: Arthropoda
- Clade: Pancrustacea
- Class: Insecta
- Order: Lepidoptera
- Superfamily: Noctuoidea
- Family: Erebidae
- Genus: Gonodonta
- Species: G. pulverea

Binomial name
- Gonodonta pulverea Schaus, 1911

Species of moth

Gonodonta pulverea is a species of fruit-piercing moth in the family Erebidae. It is found in Costa Rica and Panama.
