= Gonodonta bidens =

Scientific classification
- Kingdom: Animalia
- Phylum: Arthropoda
- Clade: Pancrustacea
- Class: Insecta
- Order: Lepidoptera
- Superfamily: Noctuoidea
- Family: Erebidae
- Genus: Gonodonta
- Species: G. bidens

Binomial name
- Gonodonta bidens Geyer, 1832

Species of moth

Gonodonta bidens is a species of fruit-piercing moth in the family Erebidae. It is found in North America.

The MONA or Hodges number for Gonodonta bidens is 8542.1.

== Subspecies ==
These three subspecies belong to the species Gonodonta bidens:

- Gonodonta bidens bidens^{g}
- Gonodonta bidens meridionalis Todd, 1959^{c g}
- Gonodonta bidens tenebrosa Todd, 1959^{c g}

Data sources: i = ITIS, c = Catalogue of Life, g = GBIF, b = Bugguide.net
