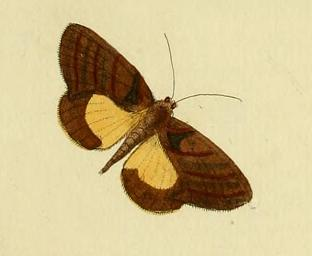

Scientific classification
- Kingdom: Animalia
- Phylum: Arthropoda
- Clade: Pancrustacea
- Class: Insecta
- Order: Lepidoptera
- Superfamily: Noctuoidea
- Family: Erebidae
- Genus: Gonodonta
- Species: G. sicheas

Binomial name
- Gonodonta sicheas (Cramer, [1777])

Synonyms
- Phalaena sicheas Cramer, [1777]; Phalaena hesione Drury, 1782; Gonodonta uncina Hübner, 1818

= Gonodonta sicheas =

Species of moth

Gonodonta sicheas is a moth of the family Erebidae first described by Pieter Cramer in 1777. It is found in Mexico, Guatemala, from Panama to Colombia, Venezuela, Ecuador, Paraguay, Peru, Brazil (Amazons and Para) and on the Antilles. It is also found in the southern United States, including Florida and Texas.

The wingspan is about 44 mm.
