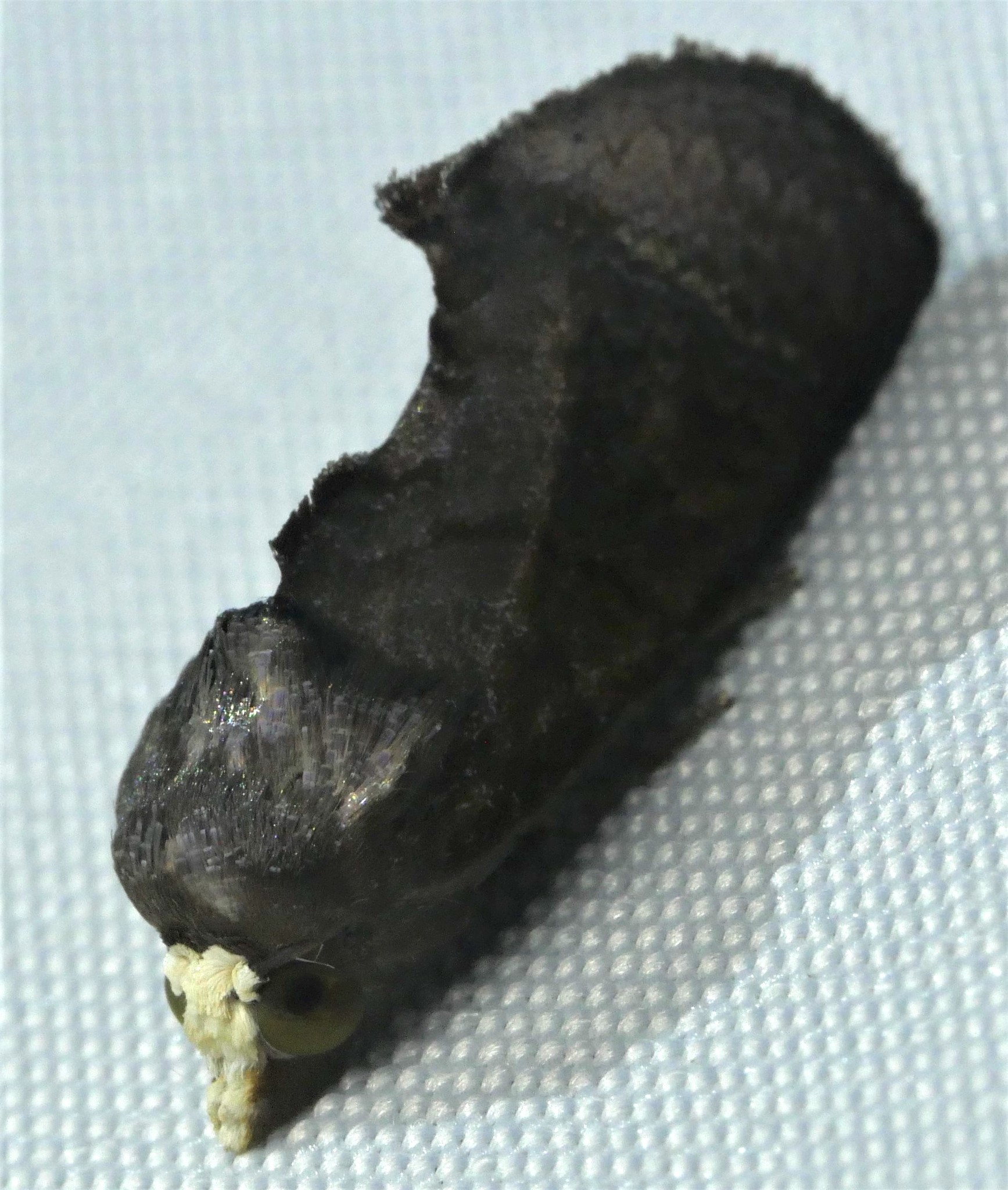
- Gonodonta clotilda

Scientific classification
- Kingdom: Animalia
- Phylum: Arthropoda
- Clade: Pancrustacea
- Class: Insecta
- Order: Lepidoptera
- Superfamily: Noctuoidea
- Family: Erebidae
- Tribe: Calpini
- Genus: Gonodonta; Hübner, 1818

Synonyms
- Athysania Hübner, [1823]; Dosa Walker, 1865

= Gonodonta =

Genus of insects

Gonodonta is a genus of moths in the family Erebidae. The genus was erected by Jacob Hübner in 1818.

== Species ==
- Gonodonta aequalis Walker, 1857
- Gonodonta aeratilinea Todd, 1973
- Gonodonta amianta Hampson, 1924
- Gonodonta biarmata Guenée, 1852
- Gonodonta bidens Geyer, 1832
- Gonodonta chorinea Cramer, 1782
- Gonodonta clotilda Stoll, 1790
- Gonodonta correcta Walker, 1857
- Gonodonta distincta Todd, 1959
- Gonodonta ditissima Walker, 1858
- Gonodonta fernandezi Todd, 1959
- Gonodonta fulvangula Geyer, 1832
- Gonodonta fulvidens Felder & Rogenhofer, 1874
- Gonodonta holosericea Guenée, 1852
- Gonodonta immacula Guenée, 1852
- Gonodonta incurva Sepp, 1840
- Gonodonta indentata Hampson, 1926
- Gonodonta latimacula Guenée, 1852
- Gonodonta lecha Schaus, 1911
- Gonodonta lincus Cramer, 1775
- Gonodonta maria Guenée, 1852
- Gonodonta mexicana Schaus, 1901
- Gonodonta nitidimacula Guenée, 1852
- Gonodonta nutrix Cramer, 1780 – citrus fruit-piercer moth
- Gonodonta obesa Walker, 1864
- Gonodonta paraequalis Todd, 1959
- Gonodonta parens Guenée, 1852
- Gonodonta primulina Druce, 1887
- Gonodonta pseudamianta Todd, 1959
- Gonodonta pulverea Schaus, 1911
- Gonodonta pyrgo Cramer, 1777
- Gonodonta separans Walker, 1857
- Gonodonta sicheas Cramer, 1777
- Gonodonta sinaldus Guenée, 1852
- Gonodonta sitia Schaus, 1911
- Gonodonta soror Cramer, 1780
- Gonodonta sphenostigma Todd, 1973
- Gonodonta syrna Guenée, 1852
- Gonodonta unica Neumoegen, 1891
- Gonodonta uxor Cramer, 1780
- Gonodonta walkeri Todd, 1959
