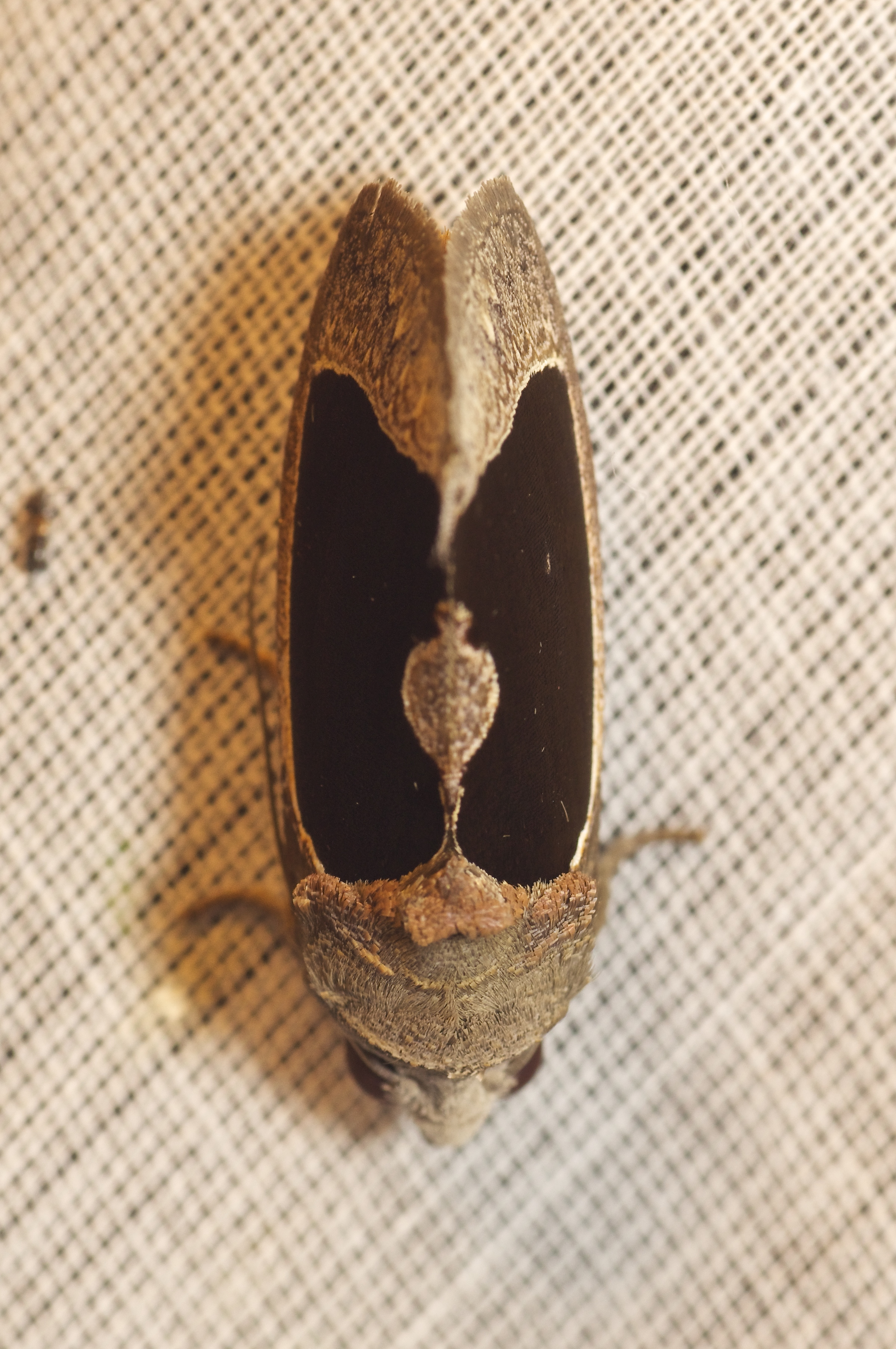

Scientific classification
- Kingdom: Animalia
- Phylum: Arthropoda
- Clade: Pancrustacea
- Class: Insecta
- Order: Lepidoptera
- Superfamily: Noctuoidea
- Family: Erebidae
- Genus: Gonodonta
- Species: G. sinaldus

Binomial name
- Gonodonta sinaldus Guenée, 1852

= Gonodonta sinaldus =

Species of moth

Gonodonta sinaldus, the moonseed fruitpiecer, is a moth of the family Erebidae. The species was first described by Achille Guenée in 1852. It is found from the Mexican border north to Concan in the Texas Hill Country. There are sporadic records north to at least Dallas, south at least to Trinidad and Colombia.

The wingspan is about 36 mm. There are probably continuous generations.

The larvae feed on moonseed vine.
