= Gonodonta aequalis =

Scientific classification
- Kingdom: Animalia
- Phylum: Arthropoda
- Clade: Pancrustacea
- Class: Insecta
- Order: Lepidoptera
- Superfamily: Noctuoidea
- Family: Erebidae
- Genus: Gonodonta
- Species: G. aequalis

Binomial name
- Gonodonta aequalis Walker, 1857

Species of moth

Gonodonta aequalis is a species of fruit-piercing moth in the family Erebidae. It is found in several countries throughout Central and South America.
