= Gonodonta chorinea =

Scientific classification
- Kingdom: Animalia
- Phylum: Arthropoda
- Clade: Pancrustacea
- Class: Insecta
- Order: Lepidoptera
- Superfamily: Noctuoidea
- Family: Erebidae
- Genus: Gonodonta
- Species: G. chorinea

Binomial name
- Gonodonta chorinea Cramer, 1782

Species of moth

Gonodonta chorinea is a species of fruit-piercing moth in the family Erebidae.
