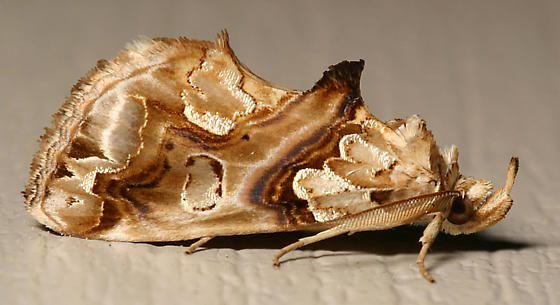

Scientific classification
- Kingdom: Animalia
- Phylum: Arthropoda
- Clade: Pancrustacea
- Class: Insecta
- Order: Lepidoptera
- Superfamily: Noctuoidea
- Family: Erebidae
- Genus: Plusiodonta
- Species: P. compressipalpis

Binomial name
- Plusiodonta compressipalpis Guenée in Boisduval and Guenée, 1852

= Plusiodonta compressipalpis =

Moonseed moth

Species of moth

Plusiodonta compressipalpis, the moonseed moth, is a moth of the family Erebidae. The species was first described by Achille Guenée in 1852. It is found in North America from Minnesota, extreme southern Canada and Connecticut, south to northern Florida and Texas.

The wingspan is 25–33 mm. Adults are on wing from May to September. There are two generations over much of east.

The larvae feed on Menispermum species and snailseed vines.
