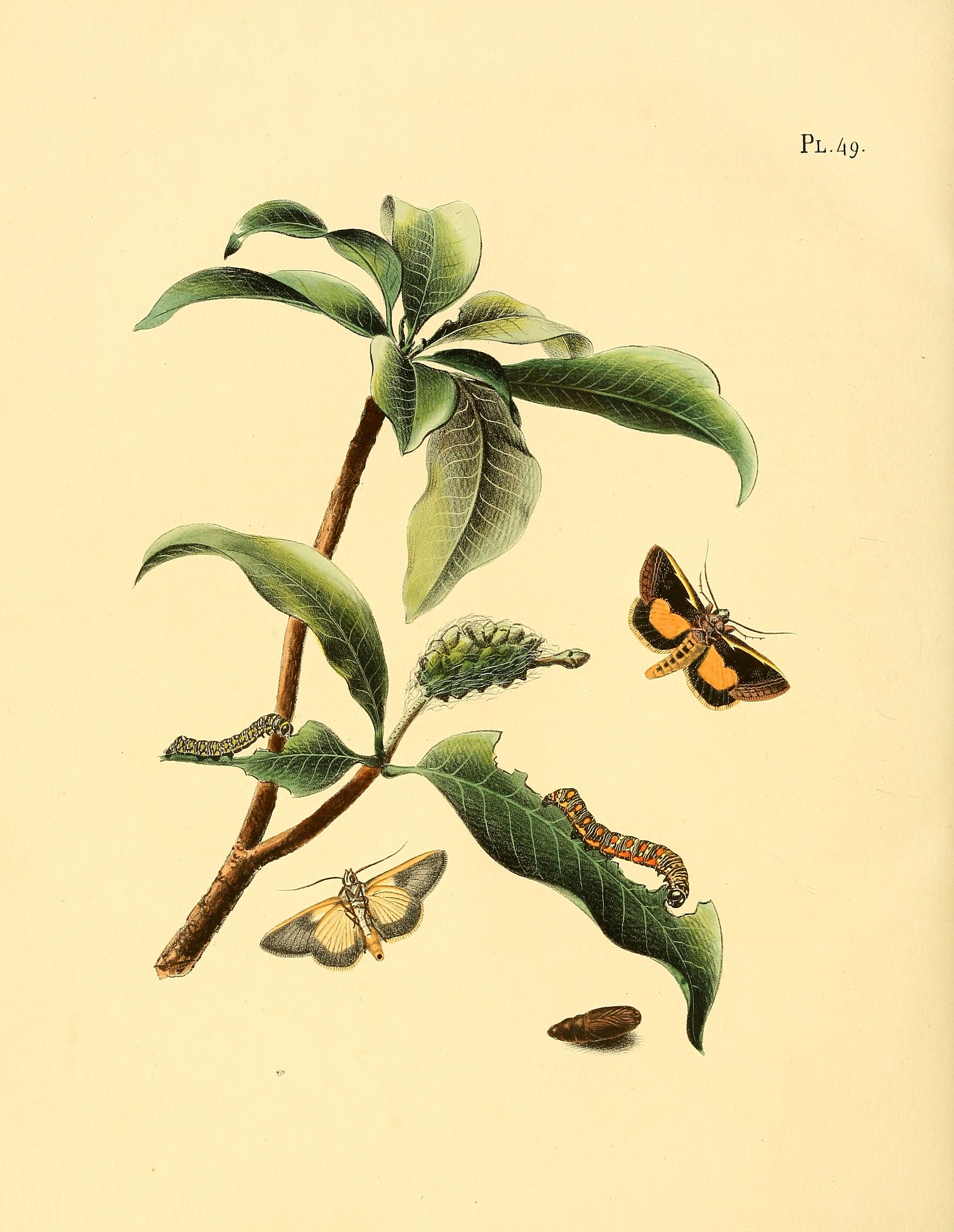
- Gonondonta nutrix

Scientific classification
- Kingdom: Animalia
- Phylum: Arthropoda
- Clade: Pancrustacea
- Class: Insecta
- Order: Lepidoptera
- Superfamily: Noctuoidea
- Family: Erebidae
- Genus: Gonodonta
- Species: G. nutrix

Binomial name
- Gonodonta nutrix Cramer, 1780

Synonyms
- Gonodonta acmeptera

= Gonodonta nutrix =

Species of moth

Gonodonta nutrix, the citrus fruitpiercer, is a moth of the family Erebidae. The species was first described by Pieter Cramer in 1780 It is found from in Saint Lucia, Cuba, Jamaica, Florida and from Mexico to Paraguay.

The wingspan is 36–40 mm.

The larvae feed on Annona species, including A. glabra.
