= Gonodonta amianta =

Scientific classification
- Kingdom: Animalia
- Phylum: Arthropoda
- Clade: Pancrustacea
- Class: Insecta
- Order: Lepidoptera
- Superfamily: Noctuoidea
- Family: Erebidae
- Genus: Gonodonta
- Species: G. amianta

Binomial name
- Gonodonta amianta Hampson, 1924

Species of moth

Gonodonta amianta is a species of fruit-piercing moth in the family Erebidae. It is found in the northern coastal areas of South America.
