= Gonodonta nitidimacula =

Scientific classification
- Kingdom: Animalia
- Phylum: Arthropoda
- Clade: Pancrustacea
- Class: Insecta
- Order: Lepidoptera
- Superfamily: Noctuoidea
- Family: Erebidae
- Genus: Gonodonta
- Species: G. nitidimacula

Binomial name
- Gonodonta nitidimacula Guenée, 1852

Species of moth

Gonodonta nitidimacula is a species of fruit-piercing moth in the family Erebidae. It is found in North America.

The MONA or Hodges number for Gonodonta nitidimacula is 8542.3.
