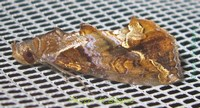
- Plusiodonta excavata

Scientific classification
- Kingdom: Animalia
- Phylum: Arthropoda
- Clade: Pancrustacea
- Class: Insecta
- Order: Lepidoptera
- Superfamily: Noctuoidea
- Family: Erebidae
- Tribe: Calpini
- Genus: Plusiodonta; Guenée in Boisduval & Guenée, 1852

Synonyms
- Gadera Walker, [1858]; Deva Walker, [1858]; Odontina Guenée, 1862; Tafalla Walker, 1869; Tinnodoa Nye, 1975

= Plusiodonta =

Genus of moths

Plusiodonta is a genus of moths in the family Erebidae erected by Achille Guenée in 1852.

== Description ==
Palpi upturned, where the second joint roughly scaled and reaching vertex of head or above it. Thorax and abdomen slender without tufts. Forewings with somewhat acute apex. The outer margin more or less angled at vein 4. Inner margin with tufts of scales at center and outer angle, the margin being excised between them. Legs smoothly scaled. Antennae bipectinated in male. Larva with two pairs of abdominal prolegs.

== Species ==
- Plusiodonta aborta Dognin, 1910
- Plusiodonta achalcea Hampson, 1926
- Plusiodonta amado Barnes, 1907 (syn: Plusiodonta suffusa Hill, 1924)
- Plusiodonta arctipennis Butler, 1886
- Plusiodonta auripicta Moore, 1882
- Plusiodonta basirhabdota Hampson, 1926
- Plusiodonta casta Butler, 1878
- Plusiodonta chalcomera Hampson, 1926
- Plusiodonta clavifera Walker, 1868
- Plusiodonta cobaltina Viette, 1956
- Plusiodonta coelonota Kollar & Redtenbacher, 1844
- Plusiodonta commoda Walker, 1865
- Plusiodonta compressipalpis Guenée in Boisduval and Guenée, 1852 – moonseed moth
- Plusiodonta cupristria Kaye, 1922
- Plusiodonta dimorpha Robinson, 1975
- Plusiodonta effulgens Edwards, 1884
- Plusiodonta euchalcia Hampson, 1926
- Plusiodonta excavata Guenée, 1862
- Plusiodonta gueneei Viette, 1968
- Plusiodonta incitans Walker, 1857
- Plusiodonta ionochrota Hampson, 1926
- Plusiodonta macra Hampson, 1926
- Plusiodonta malagasy Viette, 1968
- Plusiodonta megista Hampson, 1926
- Plusiodonta miranda Schaus, 1911
- Plusiodonta multicolora Bethune-Baker, 1906
- Plusiodonta natalensis Walker, 1865
- Plusiodonta nictites Hampson, 1902
- Plusiodonta nitissima Schaus, 1911
- Plusiodonta repellens Walker, 1857
- Plusiodonta speciosissima Holland, 1894
- Plusiodonta stimulans Walker, 1857
- Plusiodonta theresae Holloway, 1979
- Plusiodonta thomae Guenée in Boisduval and Guenée, 1852
- Plusiodonta tripuncta Bethune-Baker, 1906
- Plusiodonta wahlbergi Felder & Rogenhofer, 1874
