= Ferenta =

Scientific classification
- Kingdom: Animalia
- Phylum: Arthropoda
- Clade: Pancrustacea
- Class: Insecta
- Order: Lepidoptera
- Superfamily: Noctuoidea
- Family: Erebidae
- Tribe: Calpini
- Genus: Ferenta; Walker, 1857

Genus of moths

Ferenta is a genus of moths in the family Erebidae.

== Species ==
- Ferenta cacica Guenée, 1852
- Ferenta castula Dognin, 1912
- Ferenta incaya Hampson, 1926
- Ferenta stolliana Stoll in Cramer, 1782
