= Plusiodonta malagasy =

Scientific classification
- Kingdom: Animalia
- Phylum: Arthropoda
- Clade: Pancrustacea
- Class: Insecta
- Order: Lepidoptera
- Superfamily: Noctuoidea
- Family: Erebidae
- Genus: Plusiodonta
- Species: P. malagasy

Binomial name
- Plusiodonta malagasy (Viette, 1968)

Synonyms
- Odontina malagasy Viette, 1968

Species of moth

Plusiodonta malagasy is a moth of the family Erebidae. It is found in Madagascar.
