= Gonodonta separans =

Scientific classification
- Kingdom: Animalia
- Phylum: Arthropoda
- Clade: Pancrustacea
- Class: Insecta
- Order: Lepidoptera
- Superfamily: Noctuoidea
- Family: Erebidae
- Genus: Gonodonta
- Species: G. separans

Binomial name
- Gonodonta separans Walker, 1857

Species of moth

Gonodonta separans is a species of fruit-piercing moth in the family Erebidae.
