= Gonodonta distincta =

Scientific classification
- Kingdom: Animalia
- Phylum: Arthropoda
- Clade: Pancrustacea
- Class: Insecta
- Order: Lepidoptera
- Superfamily: Noctuoidea
- Family: Erebidae
- Genus: Gonodonta
- Species: G. distincta

Binomial name
- Gonodonta distincta Todd, 1959

Species of moth

Gonodonta distincta is a species of fruit-piercing moth in the family Erebidae.
