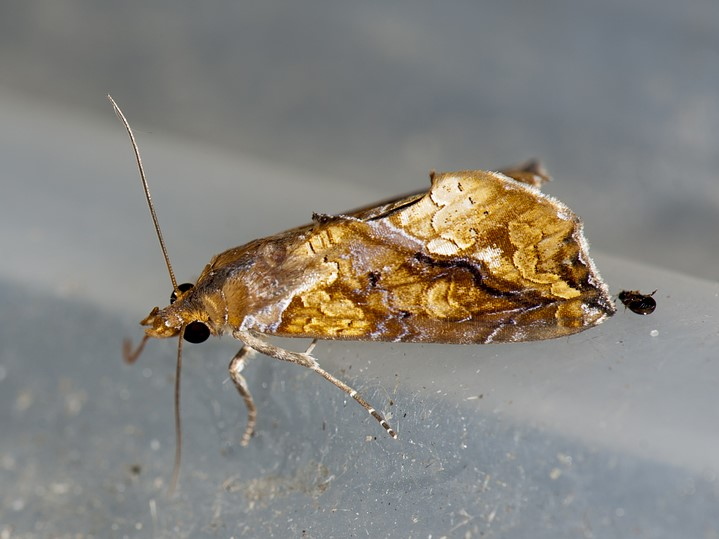

Scientific classification
- Kingdom: Animalia
- Phylum: Arthropoda
- Clade: Pancrustacea
- Class: Insecta
- Order: Lepidoptera
- Superfamily: Noctuoidea
- Family: Erebidae
- Genus: Plusiodonta
- Species: P. coelonota

Binomial name
- Plusiodonta coelonota (Kollar, 1844)

Synonyms
- Plusia coelonota Kollar & Redtenbacher, 1844; Plusia agens Felder & Rogenhofer, 1874; Plusiodonta chalsytoides Guenée, 1852; Deva conducens Walker, 1857

= Plusiodonta coelonota =

Snake vine moth

Species of moth

Plusiodonta coelonota, the snake vine moth, is a species of moth in the family Erebidae. The species was first described by Vincenz Kollar in 1844. It is found from India, Sri Lanka, Myanmar, Andaman Islands, Australia, Papua New Guinea, to South and South-East Asia.

== Description ==
The wingspan is about 25–36 mm. Male with minutely ciliated antennae. Head and collar rufous. Thorax and abdomen greyish brown. Forewings reddish brown suffused with golden bronze and more or less irrorated with bluish grey scales. Indistinct antemedial and medial waved line can be seen. An oblique double sinuous postmedial line angled below the costa. Orbicular and reniform indistinct. There is a very irregularly sinuous sub-marginal golden band with dark edges, which interrupted at vein 3. Hindwings dark fuscous. Cilia pale. Larva purplish black with grey specks and streaks. Somites 7 and 11 with pinkish patches. Head reddish.

The larvae feed on Stephania japonica and Smilax australis plants.
