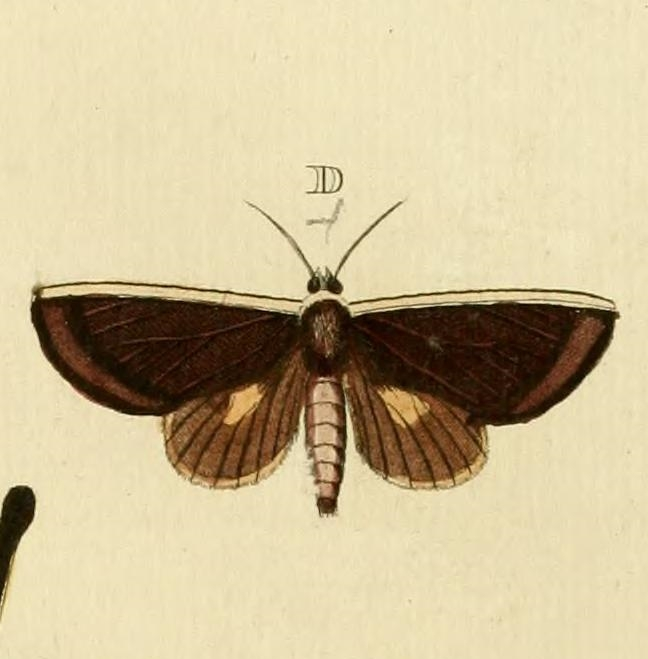

Scientific classification
- Kingdom: Animalia
- Phylum: Arthropoda
- Clade: Pancrustacea
- Class: Insecta
- Order: Lepidoptera
- Superfamily: Noctuoidea
- Family: Erebidae
- Genus: Gonodonta
- Species: G. pyrgo

Binomial name
- Gonodonta pyrgo (Cramer, 1777)

= Gonodonta pyrgo =

Species of moth

Gonodonta pyrgo is a species of fruit-piercing moth in the family Erebidae first described by Pieter Cramer in 1777. It is found in North America.

The MONA or Hodges number for Gonodonta pyrgo is 8539.
