= Insect head =

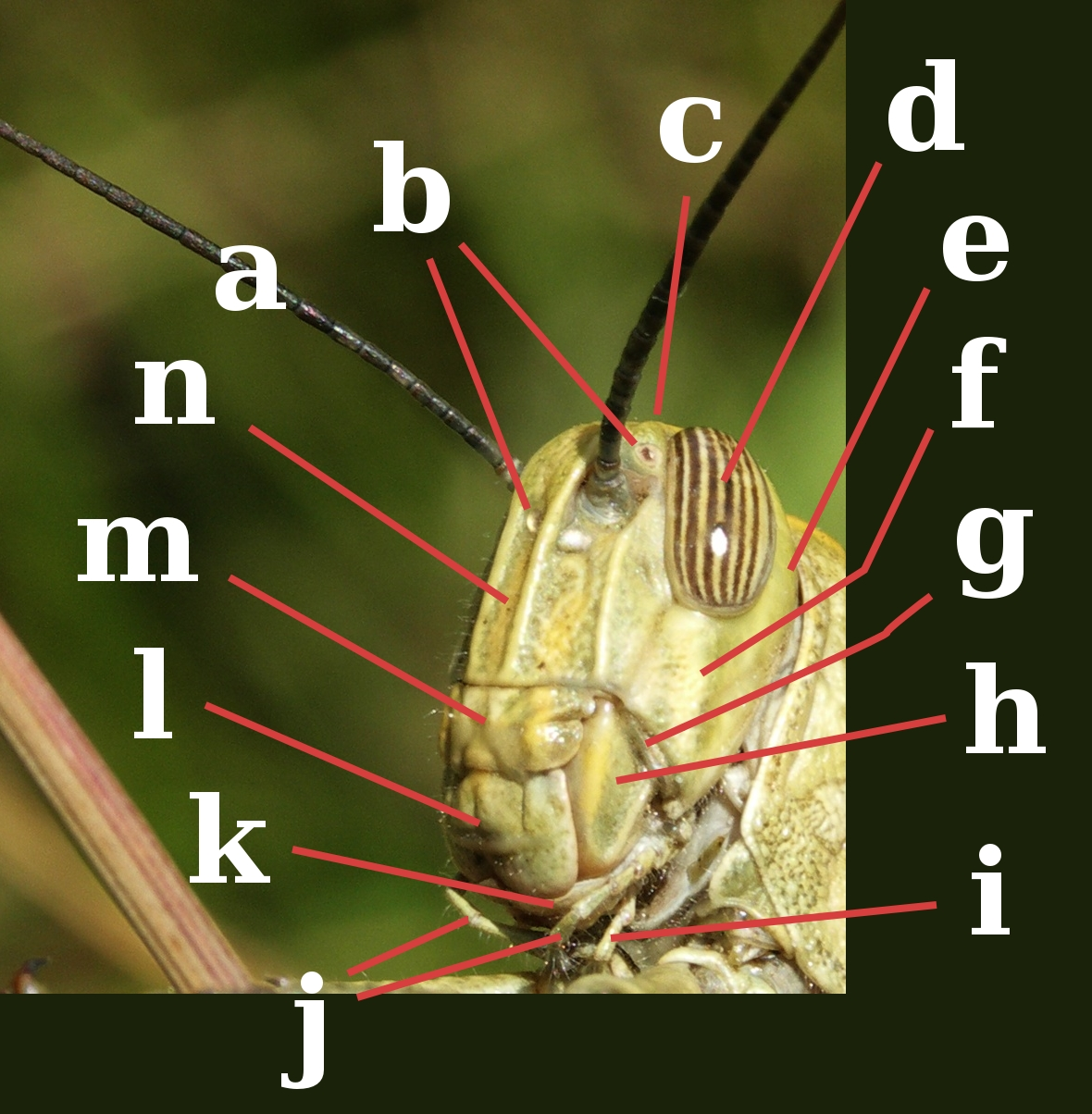
Head of Orthoptera, Acrididae. a:antenna; b:ocelli; c:vertex; d:compound eye; e:occiput; f:gena; g:pleurostoma; h:mandible; i:labial palp; j:maxillary palps; k:maxilla; l:labrum; m:clypeus; n:frons

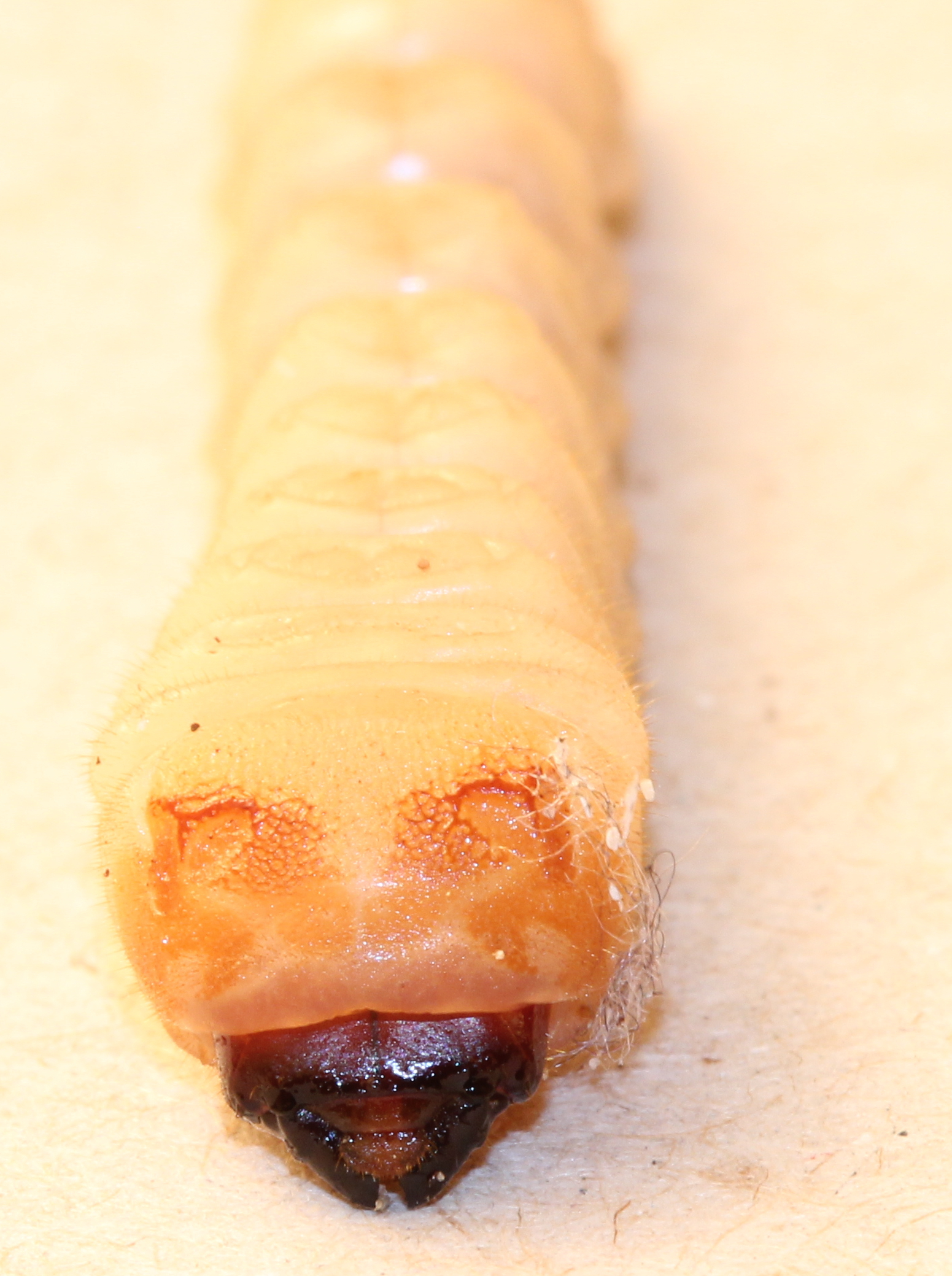
Larva of beetle, family Cerambycidae, showing sclerotised epicranium; rest of body hardly sclerotised

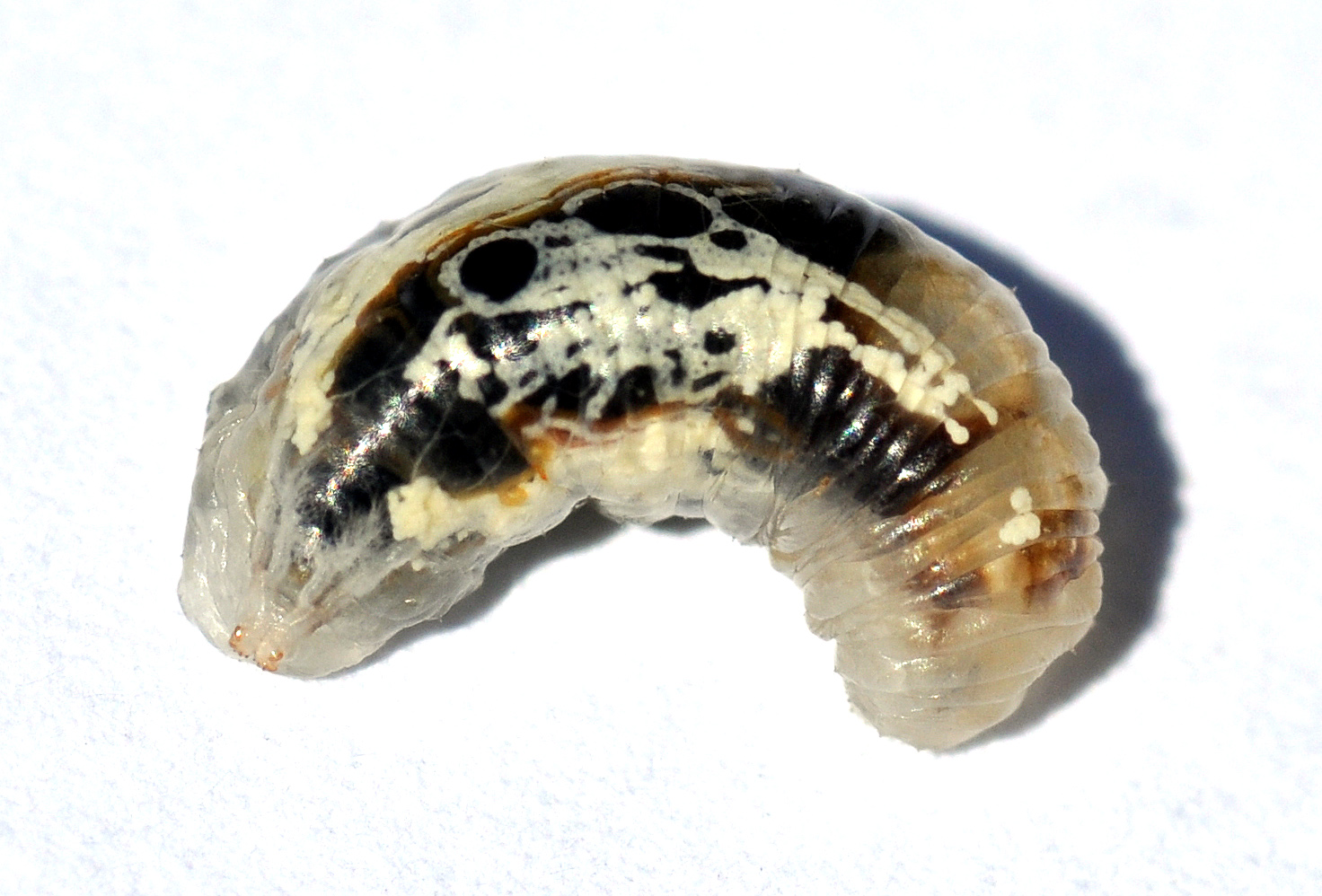
Larva of Syrphid fly, member of Cyclorrhapha, without epicranium, almost without sclerotisation apart from its jaws.

The head in most insects is enclosed in a hard, heavily sclerotized, exoskeletal head capsule. The main exception is in those species whose larvae are not fully sclerotized, mainly some holometabola; but even most unsclerotized or weakly sclerotized larvae tend to have well-sclerotized head capsules, for example, the larvae of Coleoptera and Hymenoptera. The larvae of Cyclorrhapha however, tend to have hardly any head capsule at all.

The head capsule bears most of the sensory organs, including the antennae, ocelli, and compound eyes, along with the mouthparts. In the adult insect, the head capsule appears unsegmented, though embryological studies show it to consist of six segments that bear the paired head appendages, including the mouthparts, each pair on a specific segment. Each such pair occupies one segment, though not all segments in modern insects bear any visible appendages.

Of all the insect orders, Orthoptera displays the greatest variety of features found in the heads of insects, including the sutures and sclerites. Here, the vertex, or the apex (dorsal region), is situated between the compound eyes of insects with hypognathous and opisthognathous heads. In prognathous insects, the vertex is not found between the compound eyes, but rather where the ocelli are normally found. This is because the primary axis of the head is rotated 90° to become parallel to the primary axis of the body. In some species, this region is modified and assumes a different name.

The ecdysial suture is made of the coronal, frontal, and epicranial sutures plus the ecdysial and cleavage lines, which vary among different species of insects. The ecdysial suture is longitudinally placed on the vertex, separating the epicranial halves of the head to the left and right sides. Depending on the insect, the suture may come in different shapes: like either a Y, U or V. Those diverging lines that make up the ecdysial suture are called the frontal or frontogenal sutures. Not all species of insects have frontal sutures, but in those that do, the sutures split open during ecdysis, which provides an opening for the new instar to emerge from the integument.

The frons is that part of the head capsule that lies ventrad or anteriad of the vertex. The frons varies in size relative to the insect, and in many species, the definition of its borders is arbitrary, even in some insect taxa that have well-defined head capsules. In most species, though, the frons is bordered at its anterior by the frontoclypeal or epistomal sulcus above the clypeus. Laterally it is limited by the fronto-genal sulcus, if present, and the boundary with the vertex, by the ecdysial cleavage line, if it is visible. If there is a median ocellus, it generally is on the frons, though in some insects such as many Hymenoptera, all three ocelli appear on the vertex. A more formal definition is that it is the sclerite from which the pharyngeal dilator muscles arise, but in many contexts that too, is not helpful. In the anatomy of some taxa, such as many Cicadomorpha, the front of the head is fairly clearly distinguished and tends to be broad and sub-vertical; that median area commonly is taken to be the frons.

The clypeus is a sclerite between the face and labrum, which is dorsally separated from the frons by the frontoclypeal suture in primitive insects. The clypeogenal suture laterally demarcates the clypeus, with the clypeus ventrally separated from the labrum by the clypeolabral suture. The clypeus differs in shape and size, such as species of Lepidoptera with a large clypeus with elongated mouthparts. The cheek or gena forms the sclerotized area on each side of the head below the compound eyes extending to the gular suture. Like many parts making up the insect's head, the gena varies among species, with its boundaries difficult to establish. In dragonflies and damselflies, it is between the compound eyes, clypeus, and mouthparts. The postgena is the area immediately posteriad, or posterior or lower on the gena of pterygote insects, and forms the lateral and ventral parts of the occipital arch. The occipital arch is a narrow band forming the posterior edge of the head capsule arching dorsally over the foramen. The subgenal area is usually narrow, located above the mouthparts; this area also includes the hypostoma and pleurostoma. The vertex extends anteriorly above the bases of the antennae as a prominent, pointed, concave rostrum. The posterior wall of the head capsule is penetrated by a large aperture, the foramen. Through it passes the organ systems, such as the nerve cord, esophagus, salivary ducts, and musculature, connecting the head with the thorax.

On the posterior aspect of the head are the occiput, postgena, occipital foramen, posterior tentorial pit, gula, postgenal bridge, hypostomal suture and bridge, and the mandibles, labium, and maxilla. The occipital suture is well-founded in species of Orthoptera, but not so much in other orders. Where found, the occipital suture is the arched, horseshoe-shaped groove on the back of the head ending at the posterior of each mandible. The postoccipital suture is a landmark on the posterior surface of the head, and is typically near the occipital foremen. In pterygotes, the postocciput forms the extreme posterior, often U-shaped, which forms the rim of the head extending to the postoccipital suture. In pterygotes, such as those of Orthoptera, the occipital foramen and the mouth are not separated. The three types of occipital closures, or points under the occipital foramen that separate the two lower halves of the postgena, are the hypostomal bridge, the postgenal bridge, and the gula. The hypostomal bridge is usually found in insects with hypognathous orientation. The postgenal bridge is found in the adults of species of higher Diptera and aculeate Hymenoptera, while the gula is found on some Coleoptera, Neuroptera, and Isoptera, which typically display prognathous-oriented mouthparts.

== Compound eyes and ocelli ==
Most insects have one pair of large, prominent compound eyes composed of units called ommatidia (ommatidium, singular), up to 30,000 in a single compound eye of, for example, large dragonflies. This type of eye gives less resolution than eyes found in vertebrates, but it gives an acute perception of movement and usually possesses UV- and green sensitivity, and may have additional sensitivity peaks in other regions of the visual spectrum. Often an ability to detect the E-vector of polarized light exists in polarization of light. There can also be an additional two or three ocelli, which help detect low light or small changes in light intensity. The image perceived is a combination of inputs from the numerous ommatidia, located on a convex surface, thus pointing in slightly different directions. Compared with simple eyes, compound eyes possess very large view angles and better acuity than the insect's dorsal ocelli, but some stemmatal (= larval eyes), for example, those of sawfly larvae (Tenthredinidae) with an acuity of 4 degrees and very high polarization sensitivity, match the performance of compound eyes.

Ocellus cross-section

Compound eye cross-section

Because the individual lenses are so small, the effects of diffraction impose a limit on the possible resolution that can be obtained (assuming they do not function as phased arrays). This can only be countered by increasing lens size and number. To see with a resolution comparable to our simple eyes, humans would require compound eyes that would each reach the size of their heads. Compound eyes fall into two groups: apposition eyes, which form multiple inverted images, and superposition eyes, which form a single erect image. Compound eyes grow at their margins with the addition of new ommatidia.

== Antennae ==
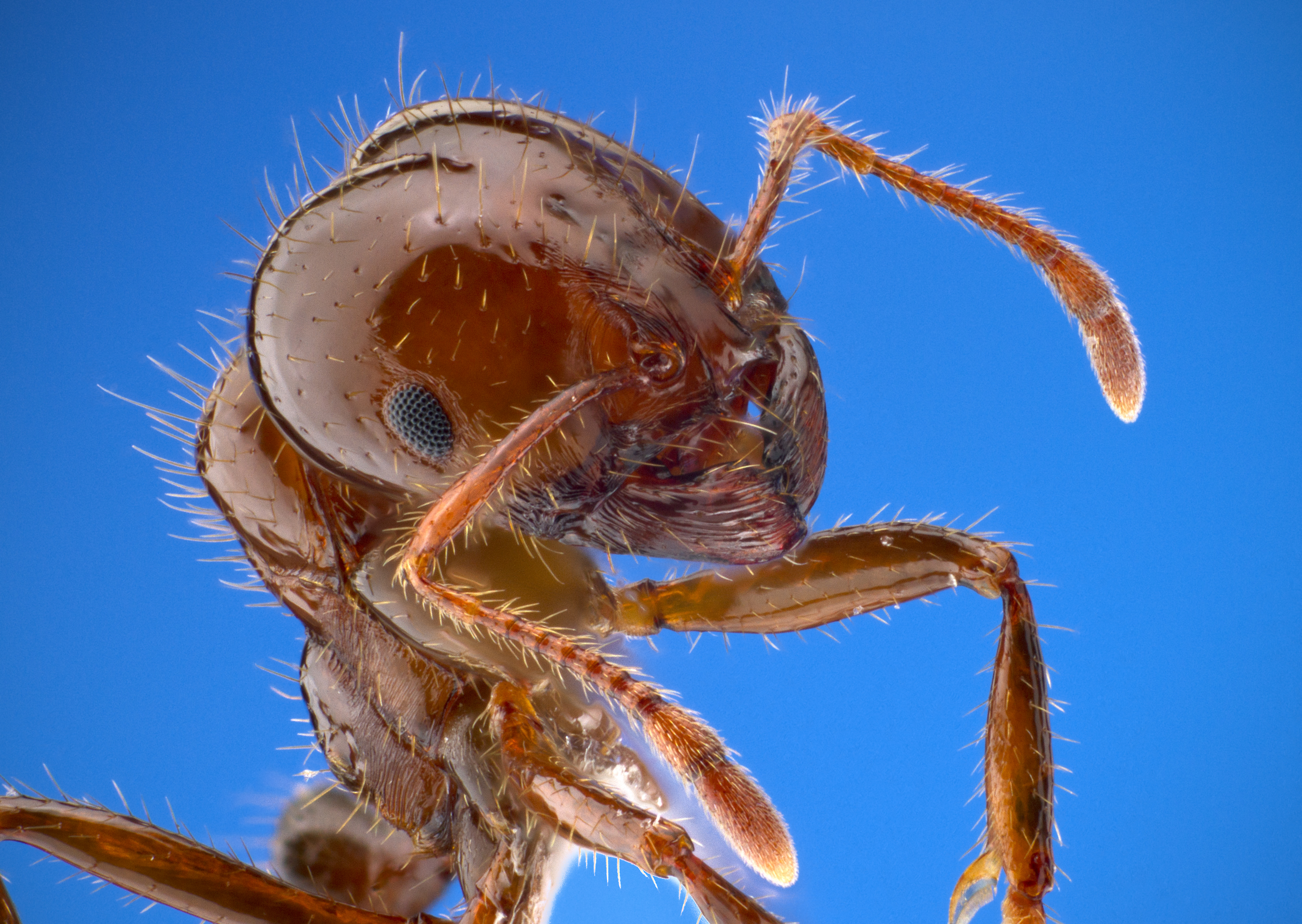
Closeup of a fire ant, showing fine sensory hairs on antennae

Antennae, sometimes called "feelers", are flexible appendages located on the insect's head which are used for sensing the environment. Insects can feel with their antennae because of the fine hairs (setae) that cover them. However, touch is not the only thing that antennae can detect; numerous tiny sensory structures on the antennae allow insects to sense smells, temperature, humidity, pressure, and even potentially sense themselves in space. Some insects, including bees and some groups of flies, can also detect sound with their antennae.

The number of segments in an antenna varies amongst insects, with higher flies having 3-6 segments, while adult cockroaches can have over 140. The general shape of the antennae is also quite variable, but the first segment (the one attached to the head) is always called the scape, and the second segment is called the pedicel. The remaining antennal segments or flagellomeres are called the flagellum.

General insect antenna types are shown below:

Types of insect antennae
Aristate	Capitate	Clavate	Filiform	Flabellate	Geniculate	Setaceous
Lamellate	Moniliform	Pectinate	Plumose	Serrate	Stylate	Setaceous

== Mouthparts ==
The insect mouthparts consist of the maxilla, labium, and in some species, the mandibles. The labrum is a simple, fused sclerite, often called the upper lip, and moves longitudinally. It is hinged to the clypeus. The mandibles (jaws) are a highly sclerotized pair of structures that move at right angles to the body, used for biting, chewing, and severing food. The maxillae are paired structures that can also move at right angles to the body and possess segmented palps. The labium (lower lip) is the fused structure that moves longitudinally and has a pair of segmented palps.

The development of insect mouthparts from the primitive chewing mouthparts of a grasshopper in the center (A), to the lapping type (B) of a bee, the siphoning type (C) of a butterfly and the sucking type (D) of a female mosquito. Legend: a – antennae c – compound eye lb – labium lr – labrum md – mandibles mx – maxillae

The mouthparts and rest of the head can be articulated in at least three different positions: prognathous, opisthognathous, and hypognathous. In species with prognathous articulation, the head is vertically aligned with the body, such as species of Formicidae; while in a hypognathous type, the head is aligned horizontally adjacent to the body. An opisthognathous head is positioned diagonally, such as in species of Blattodea and some Coleoptera. The mouthparts vary greatly between insects of different orders, but the two main functional groups are mandibulate and haustellate. Haustellate mouthparts are used for sucking liquids and can be further classified by the presence of stylets, which include piercing-sucking, sponging, and siphoning. The stylets are needle-like projections used to penetrate plant and animal tissues. The stylets and the feeding tube form the modified mandibles, maxilla, and hypopharynx.

- Mandibulate mouthparts, among the most common in insects, are used for biting and grinding solid foods.
- Piercing-sucking mouthparts have stylets and are used to penetrate solid tissue and then suck up liquid food.
- Sponging mouthparts are used to sponge and suck liquids, and lack stylets (e.g. most Diptera).
- Siphoning mouthparts lack stylets and are used to suck liquids and are commonly found among species of Lepidoptera.

Mandibular mouthparts are found in species of Odonata, adult Neuroptera, Coleoptera, Hymenoptera, Blattodea, Orthoptera, and Lepidoptera. However, most adult Lepidoptera have siphoning mouthparts, while their larvae (commonly called caterpillars) have mandibles.

=== Definition of mouthparts ===
The labrum is a broad lobe forming the roof of the preoral cavity, suspended from the clypeus in front of the mouth and forming the upper lip. On its inner side, it is membranous and may be produced into a median lobe, the epipharynx, bearing some sensilla. The labrum is raised away from the mandibles by two muscles arising in the head and inserted medially into the anterior margin of the labrum. It is closed against the mandibles in part by two muscles arising in the head and inserted on the posterior lateral margins on two small sclerites, the tormae, and, at least in some insects, by a resilin spring in the cuticle at the junction of the labrum with the clypeus. Until recently, the labrum generally was considered to be associated with the first head segment. However, recent studies of the embryology, gene expression, and nerve supply to the labrum show it is innervated by the tritocerebrum of the brain, which is the fused ganglia of the third head segment. This is formed from the fusion of parts of a pair of ancestral appendages found on the third head segment, showing their relationship. Its ventral, or inner, surface is usually membranous and forms the lobe-like epipharynx, which bears mechanosensilla and chemosensilla.

Chewing insects have two mandibles, one on each side of the head. The mandibles are positioned between the labrum and maxillae. The mandibles cut and crush food, and may be used for defense; generally, they have an apical cutting edge, and the more basal molar area grinds the food. They can be extremely hard (around 3 on Mohs, or an indentation hardness of about 30 kg/mm^{2}); thus, many termites and beetles have no physical difficulty in boring through foils made from such common metals as copper, lead, tin, and zinc. The cutting edges are typically strengthened by the addition of zinc, manganese, or rarely, iron, in amounts up to about 4% of the dry weight. They are typically the largest mouthparts of chewing insects, being used to masticate (cut, tear, crush, chew) food items. They open outwards (to the sides of the head) and come together medially. In carnivorous, chewing insects, the mandibles can be modified to be more knife-like, whereas in herbivorous chewing insects, they are more typically broad and flat on their opposing faces (e.g., caterpillars). In male stag beetles, the mandibles are modified to such an extent as to not serve any feeding function but are instead used to defend mating sites from other males. In ants, the mandibles also serve a defensive function (particularly in soldier castes). In bull ants, the mandibles are elongated and toothed, used as hunting (and defensive) appendages.

Situated beneath the mandibles, paired maxillae manipulate food during mastication. Maxillae can have hairs and "teeth" along their inner margins. At the outer margin, the galea is a cupped or scoop-like structure, which sits over the outer edge of the labium. They also have palps, which are used to sense the characteristics of potential foods. The maxillae occupy a lateral position, one on each side of the head behind the mandibles. The proximal part of the maxilla consists of a basal cardo, which has a single articulation with the head, and a flat plate, the stipes, hinged to the cardo. Both cardo and stipes are loosely joined to the head by a membrane, so they are capable of movement. Distally on the stipes are two lobes, an inner lacinea, and an outer galea, one or both of which may be absent. More laterally on the stipes is a jointed, leglike palp made up of many segments; in Orthoptera, there are five. Anterior and posterior rotator muscles are inserted on the cardo, and ventral adductor muscles arising on the tentorium are inserted on both the cardo and stipes. Arising in the stipes are flexor muscles of the lacinea and galea and another lacineal flexor arises in the cranium, but neither the lacinea nor the galea has an extensor muscle. The palp has levator and depressor muscles arising in the stipes, and each segment of the palp has a single muscle causing flexion of the next segment.

In mandibulate mouthparts, the labium is a quadrupedal structure, although it is formed from two fused secondary maxillae. It can be described as the floor of the mouth. With the maxillae, it assists with the manipulation of food during mastication or chewing or, in the unusual case of the dragonfly nymph, extends out to snatch prey back to the head, where the mandibles can eat it. The labium is similar in structure to the maxilla, but with the appendages of the two sides fused by the midline, so they come to form a median plate. The basal part of the labium, equivalent to the maxillary cardines and possibly including a part of the sternum of the labial segment, is called the postmentum. This may be subdivided into a proximal submentum and a distal mentum. Distal to the postmentum, and equivalent to the fused maxillary stipites, is the prementum. The prementum closes the preoral cavity from behind. Terminally, it bears four lobes, two inner glossae, and two outer paraglossae, which are collectively known as the ligula. One or both pairs of lobes may be absent or they may be fused to form a single median process. A palp arises from each side of the prementum, often being three-segmented.

The hypopharynx is a median lobe immediately behind the mouth, projecting forwards from the back of the preoral cavity; it is a lobe of uncertain origin, but perhaps associated with the mandibular segment; in apterygotes, earwigs, and nymphal mayflies, the hypopharynx bears a pair of lateral lobes, the superlinguae (singular: superlingua). It divides the cavity into a dorsal food pouch, or cibarium, and a ventral salivarium into which the salivary duct opens. It is commonly found fused to the libium. Most of the hypopharynx is membranous, but the adoral face is sclerotized distally, and proximally contains a pair of suspensory sclerites extending upwards to end in the lateral wall of the stomodeum. Muscles arising on the frons are inserted into these sclerites, which distally are hinged to a pair of lingual sclerites. These, in turn, have inserted into them antagonistic pairs of muscles arising on the tentorium and labium. The various muscles serve to swing the hypopharynx forwards and back, and in the cockroach, two more muscles run across the hypopharynx and dilate the salivary orifice and expand the salivarium.

Diversity of mandibles

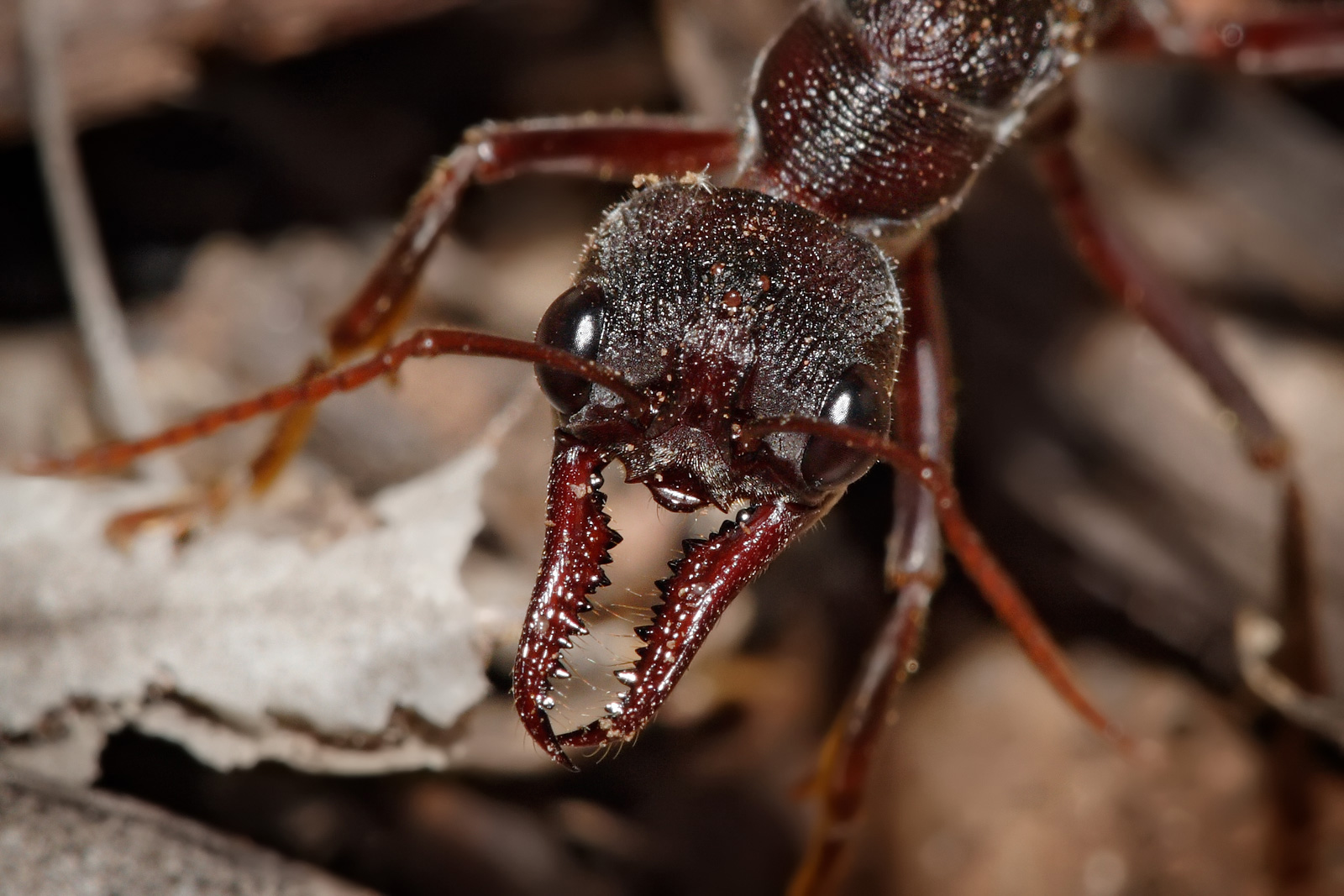

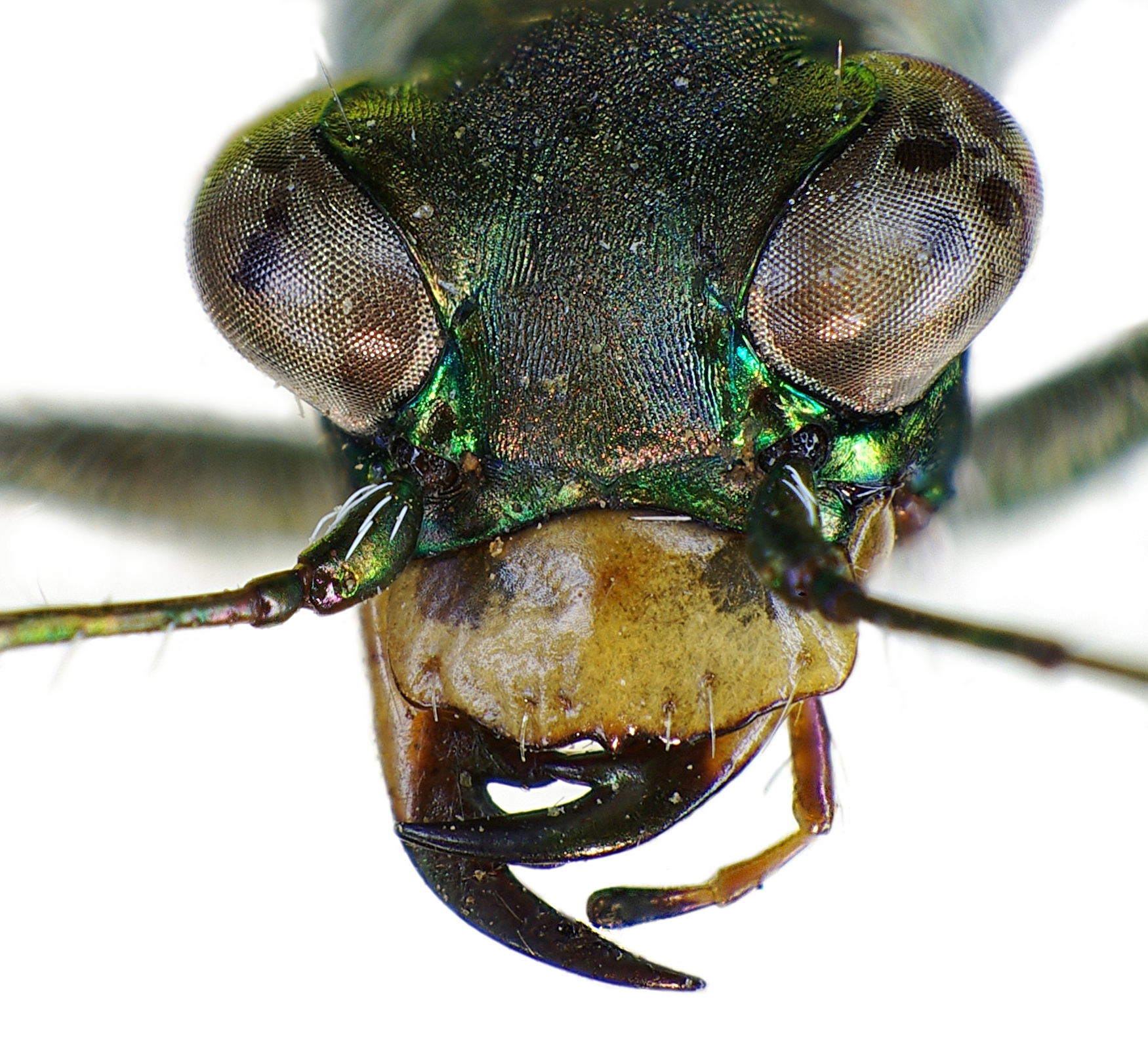

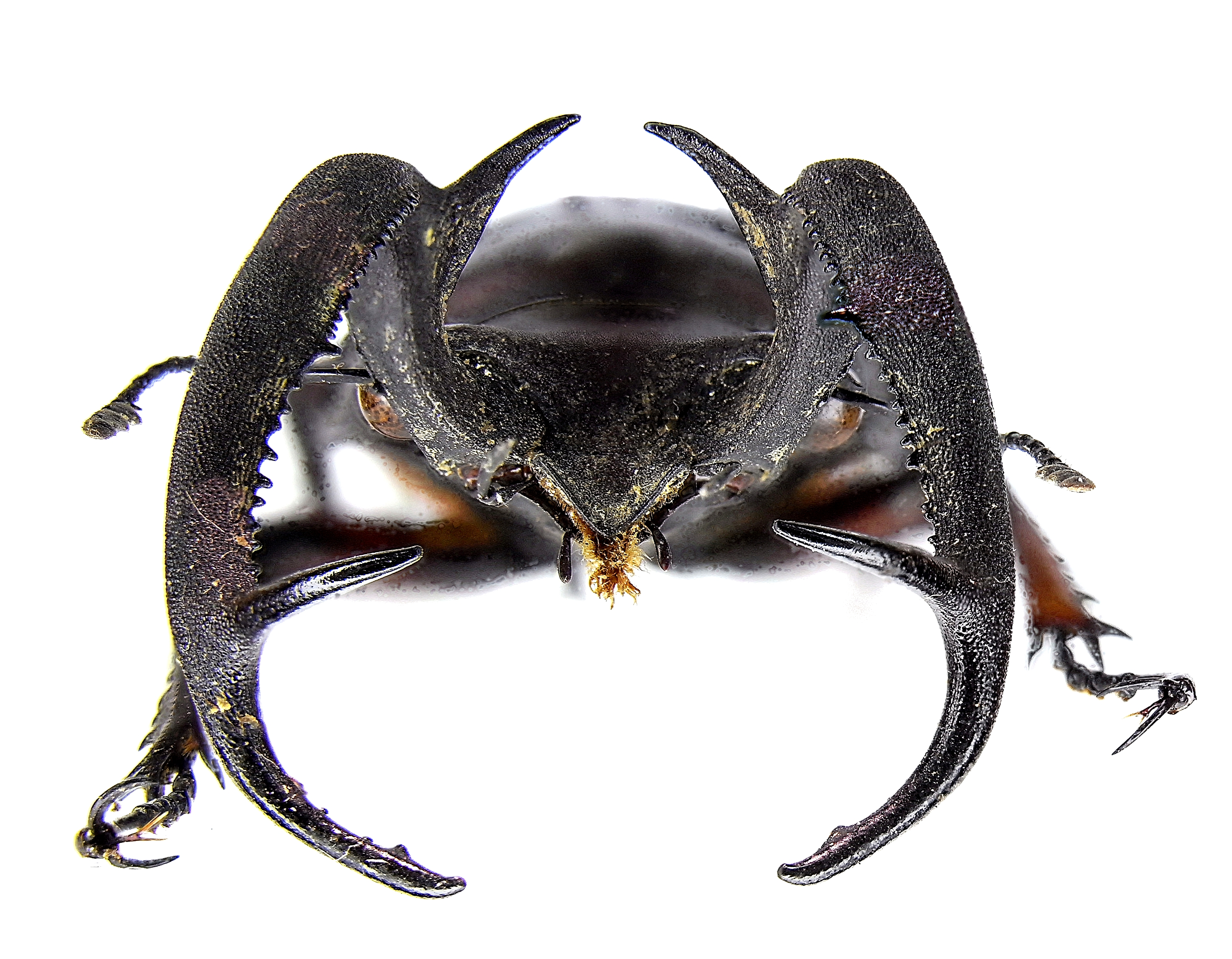

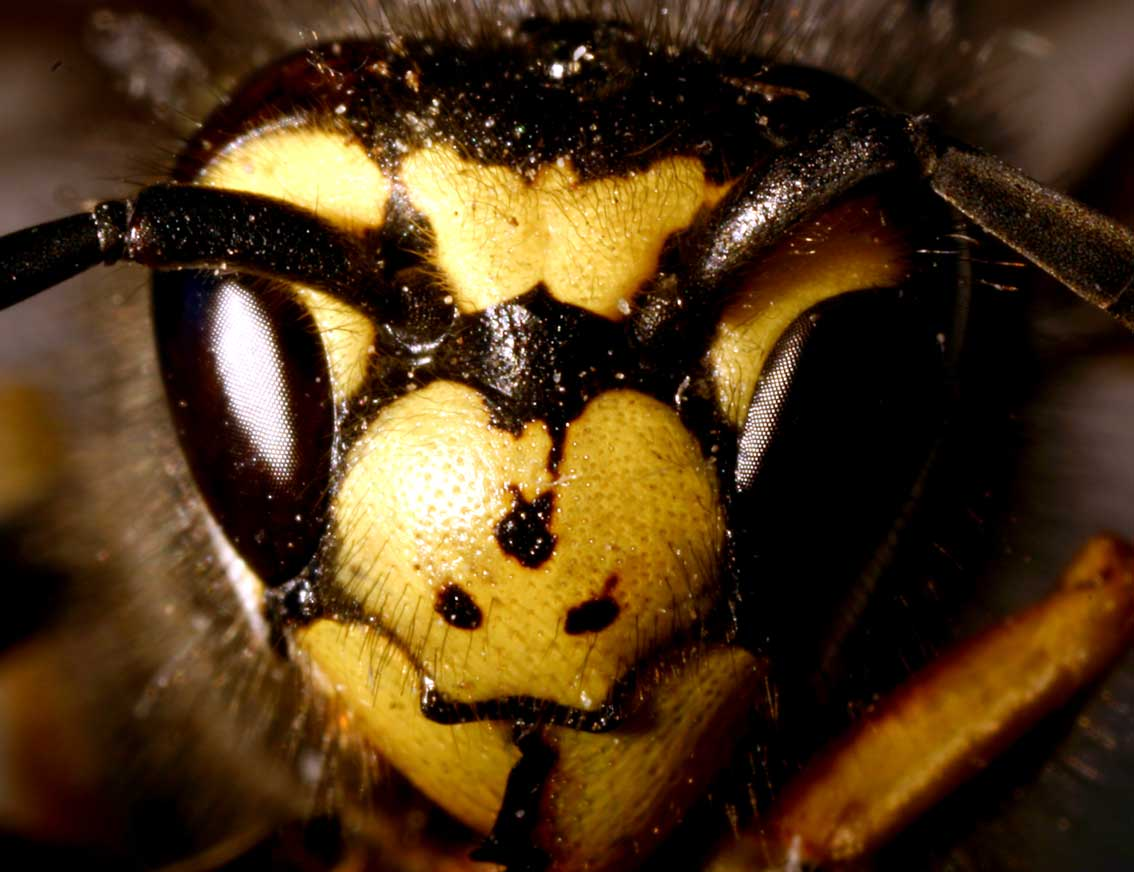

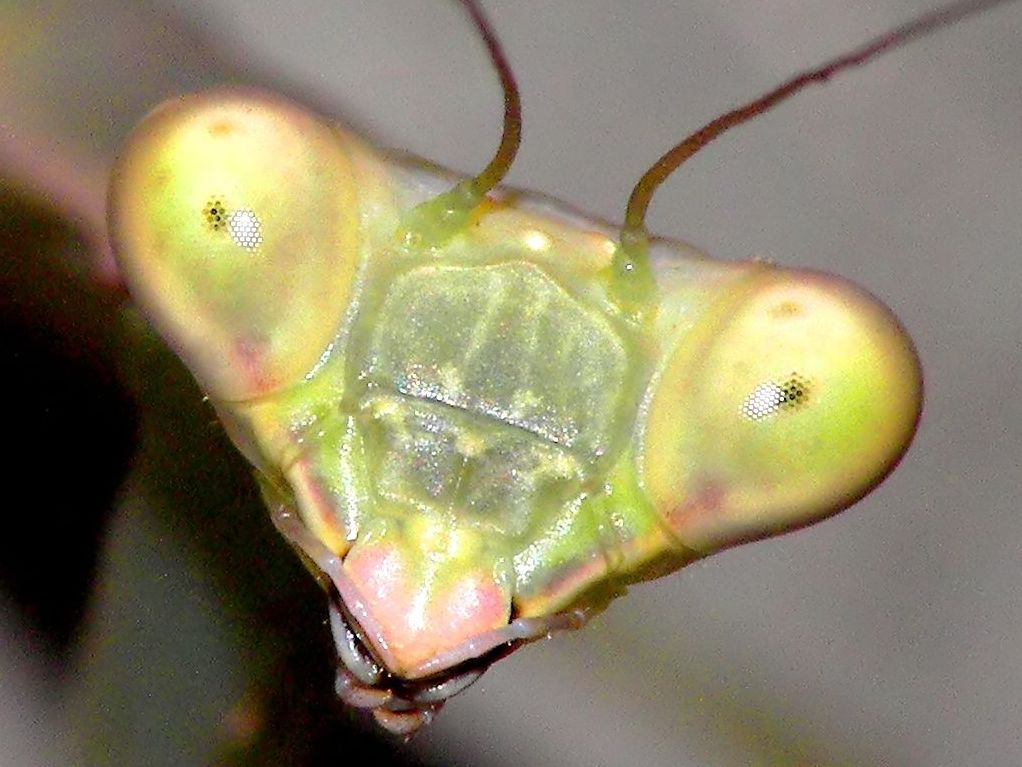

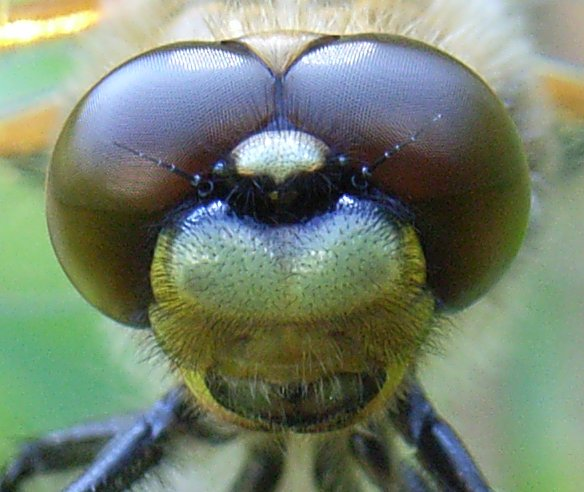

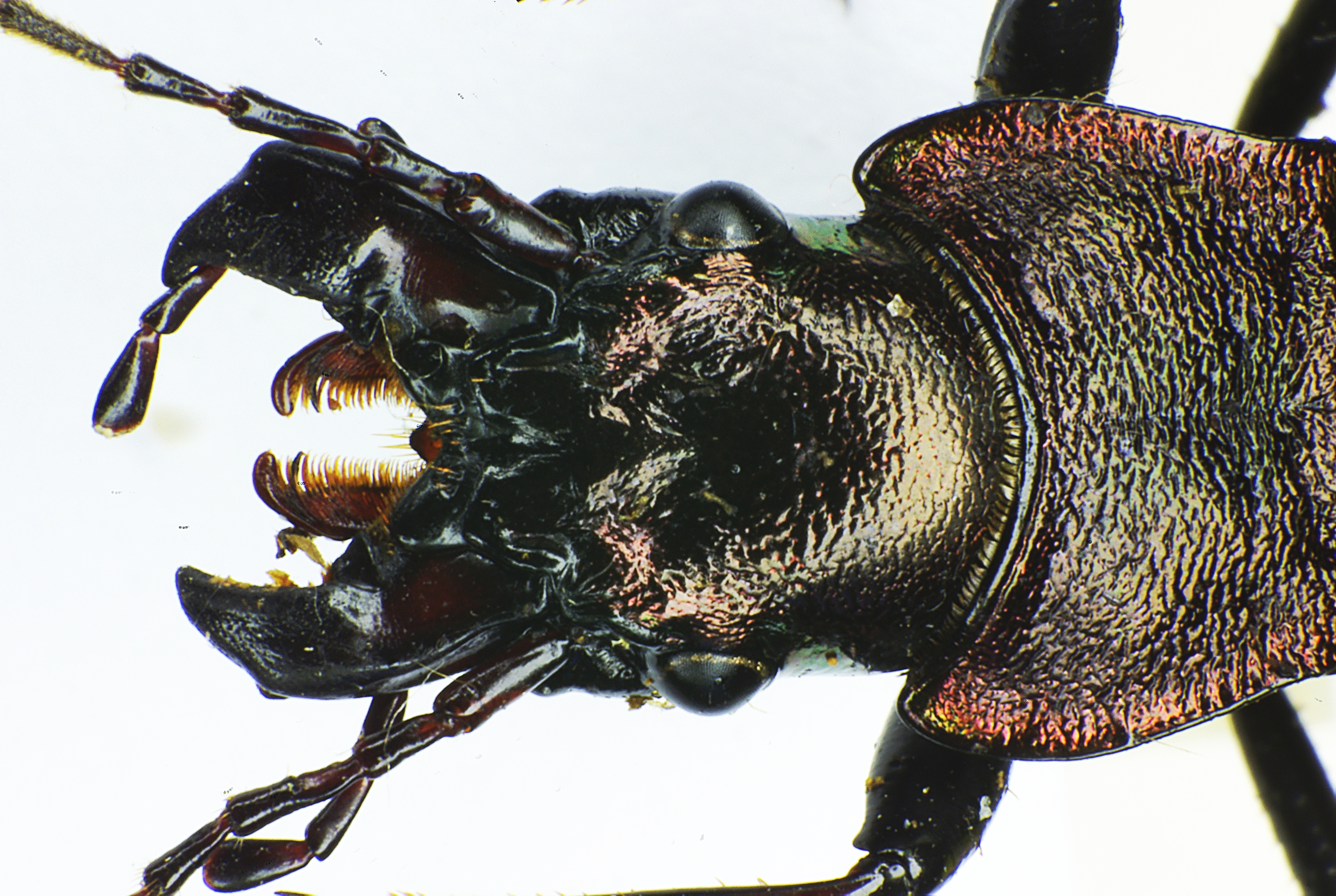

=== Piercing-sucking ===
Mouthparts can have multiple functions. Some insects combine piercing parts along with sponging ones which are then used to pierce through tissues of plants and animals. Female mosquitoes feed on blood (hemophagous) making them disease vectors. The mosquito mouthparts consist of the proboscis, paired mandibles and maxillae. The maxillae form needle-like structures, called stylets, which are enclosed by the labium. When mosquito bites, maxillae penetrate the skin and anchor the mouthparts, thus allowing other parts to be inserted. The sheath-like labium slides back, and the remaining mouthparts pass through its tip and into the tissue. Then, through the hypopharynx, the mosquito injects saliva, which contains anticoagulants to stop the blood from clotting. And finally, the labrum (upper lip) is used to suck up the blood. Species of the genus Anopheles are characterized by their long palpi (two parts with widening end), almost reaching the end of labrum.

Diversity of piercing mouthparts

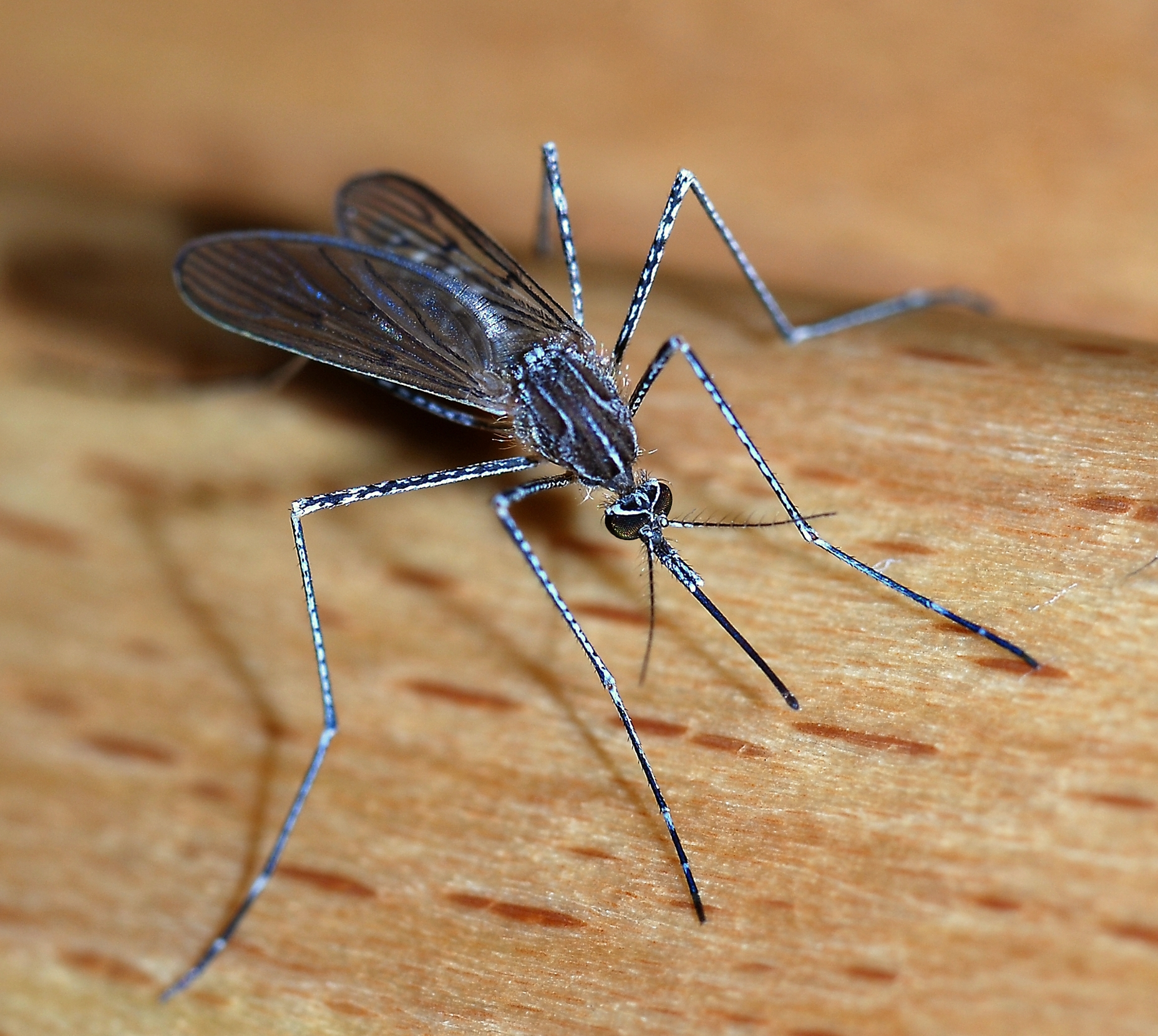
Mosquito

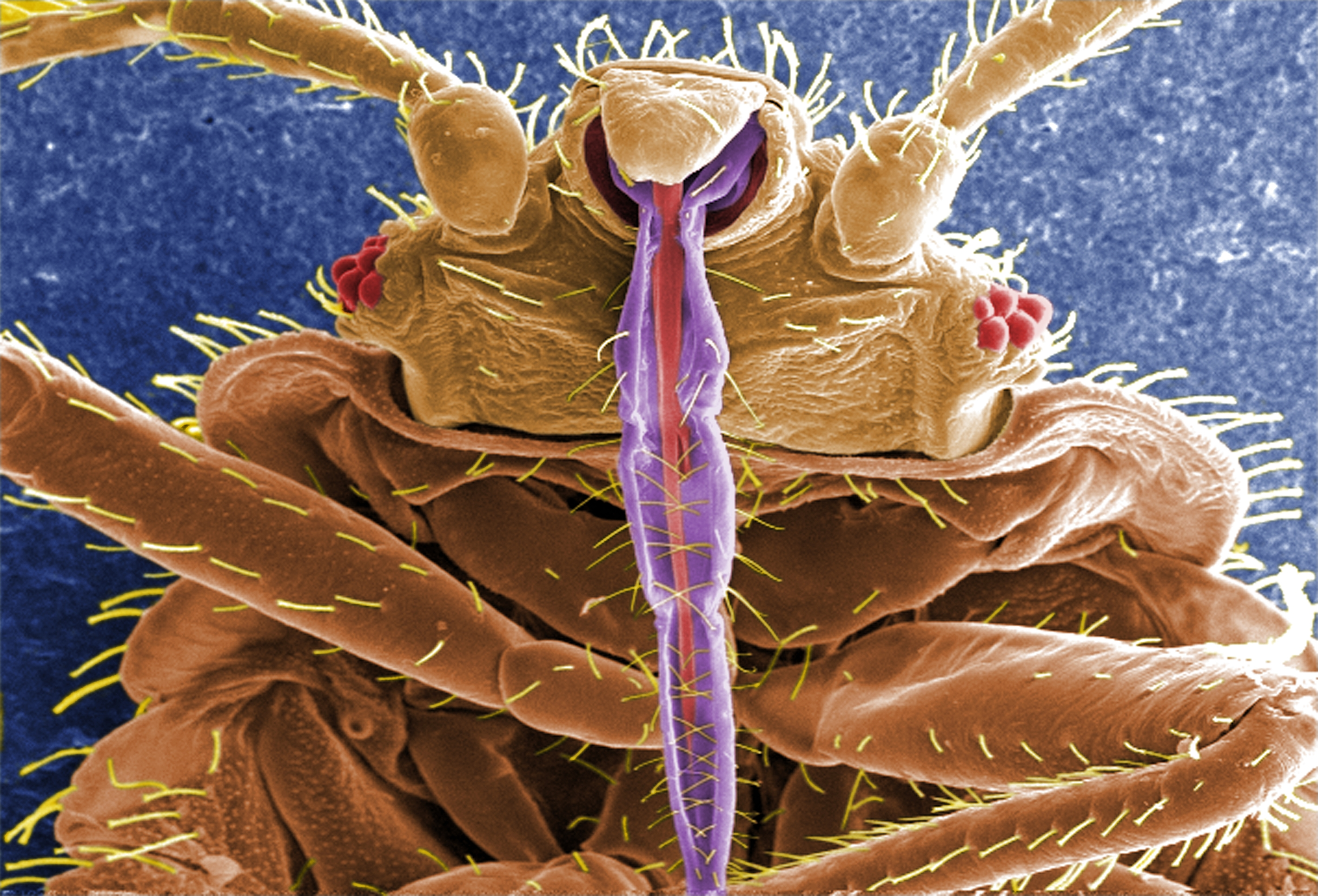
Cimex lectularius

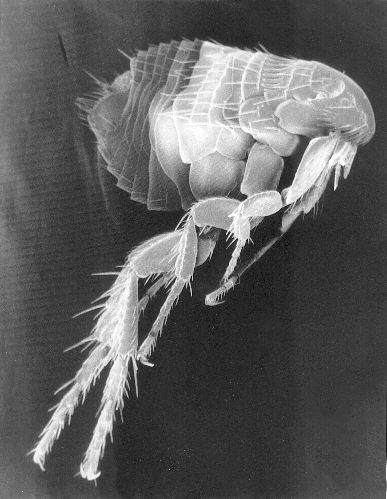
Flea

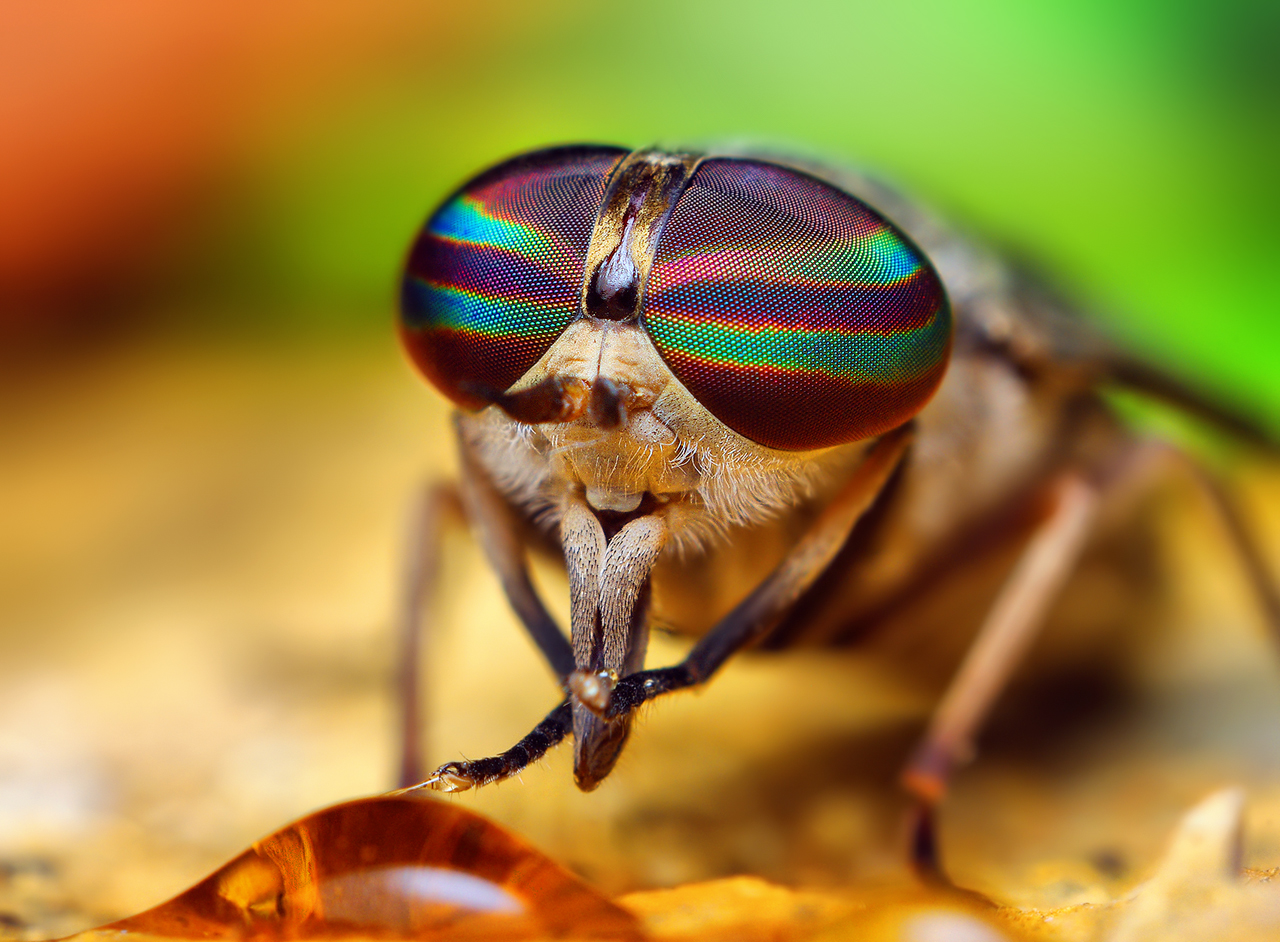
horsefly (female)

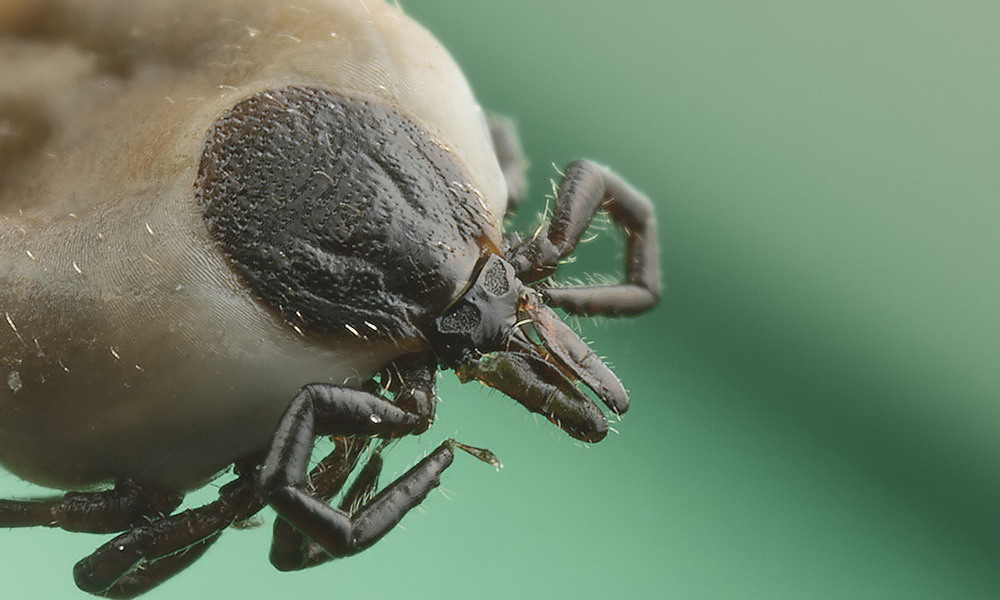
Tick (Ixodes ricinus), an arachnid for comparison

=== Siphoning ===
The proboscis is formed from maxillary galeae and is an adaption found in some insects for sucking. The muscles of the cibarium or pharynx are strongly developed and form the pump. In Hemiptera and many Diptera, which feed on fluids within plants or animals, some components of the mouthparts are modified for piercing, and the elongated structures are called stylets. The combined tubular structures are referred to as the proboscis, although specialized terminology is used in some groups.

In species of Lepidoptera, it consists of two tubes held together by hooks and separable for cleaning. Each tube is inwardly concave, thus forming a central tube through which moisture is sucked. Suction is affected by the contraction and expansion of a sac in the head. The proboscis is coiled under the head when the insect is at rest and is extended only when feeding. The maxillary palpi are reduced or even vestigial. They are conspicuous and five-segmented in some of the more basal families and are often folded. The shape and dimensions of the proboscis have evolved to give different species wider and therefore more advantageous diets. There is an allometric scaling relationship between the body mass of Lepidoptera and length of the proboscis from which an interesting adaptive departure is the unusually long-tongued hawk moth Xanthopan morganii praedicta. Charles Darwin predicted the existence and proboscis length of this moth before its discovery based on his knowledge of the long-spurred Madagascan star orchid Angraecum sesquipedale.

Siphoning mouthparts

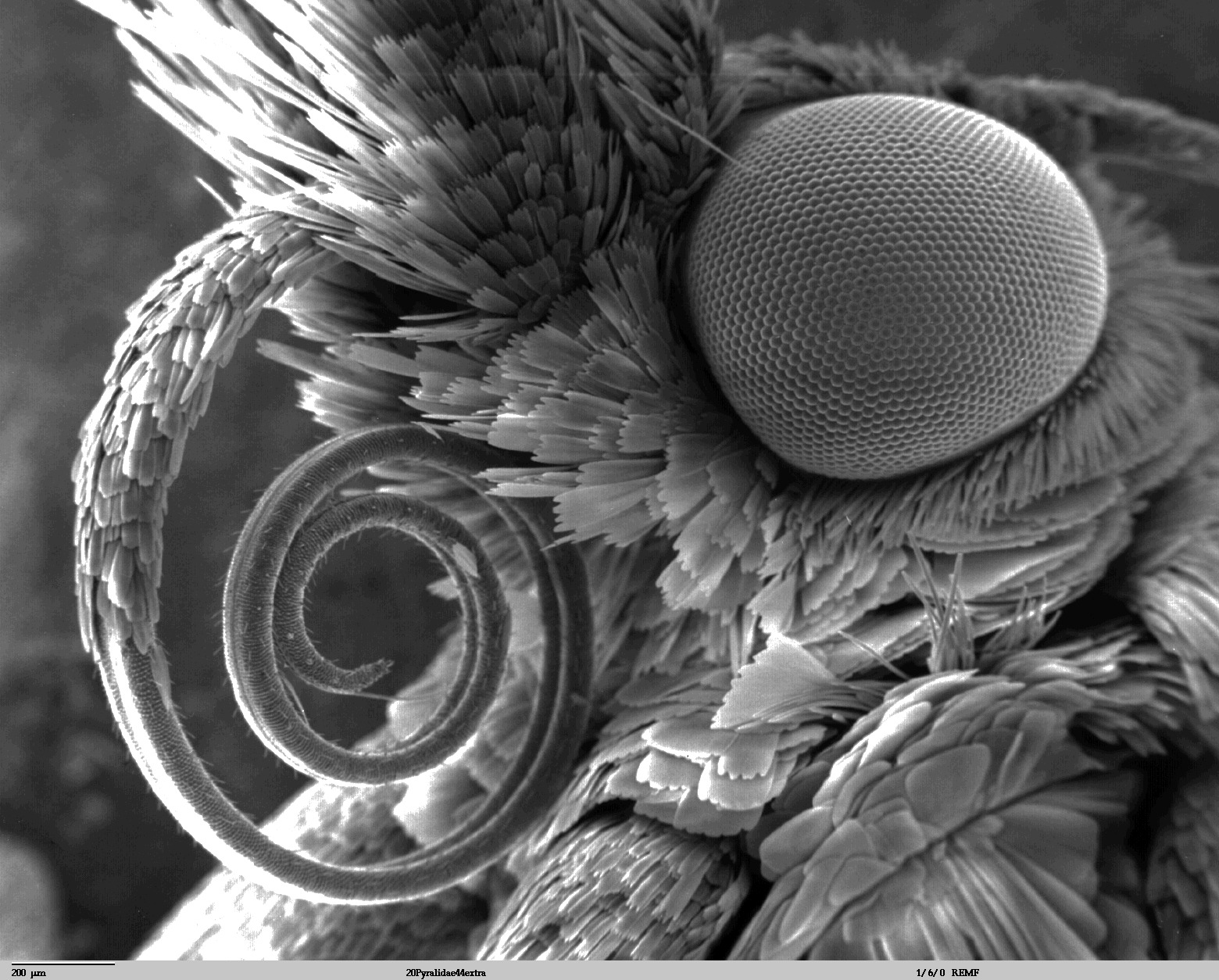

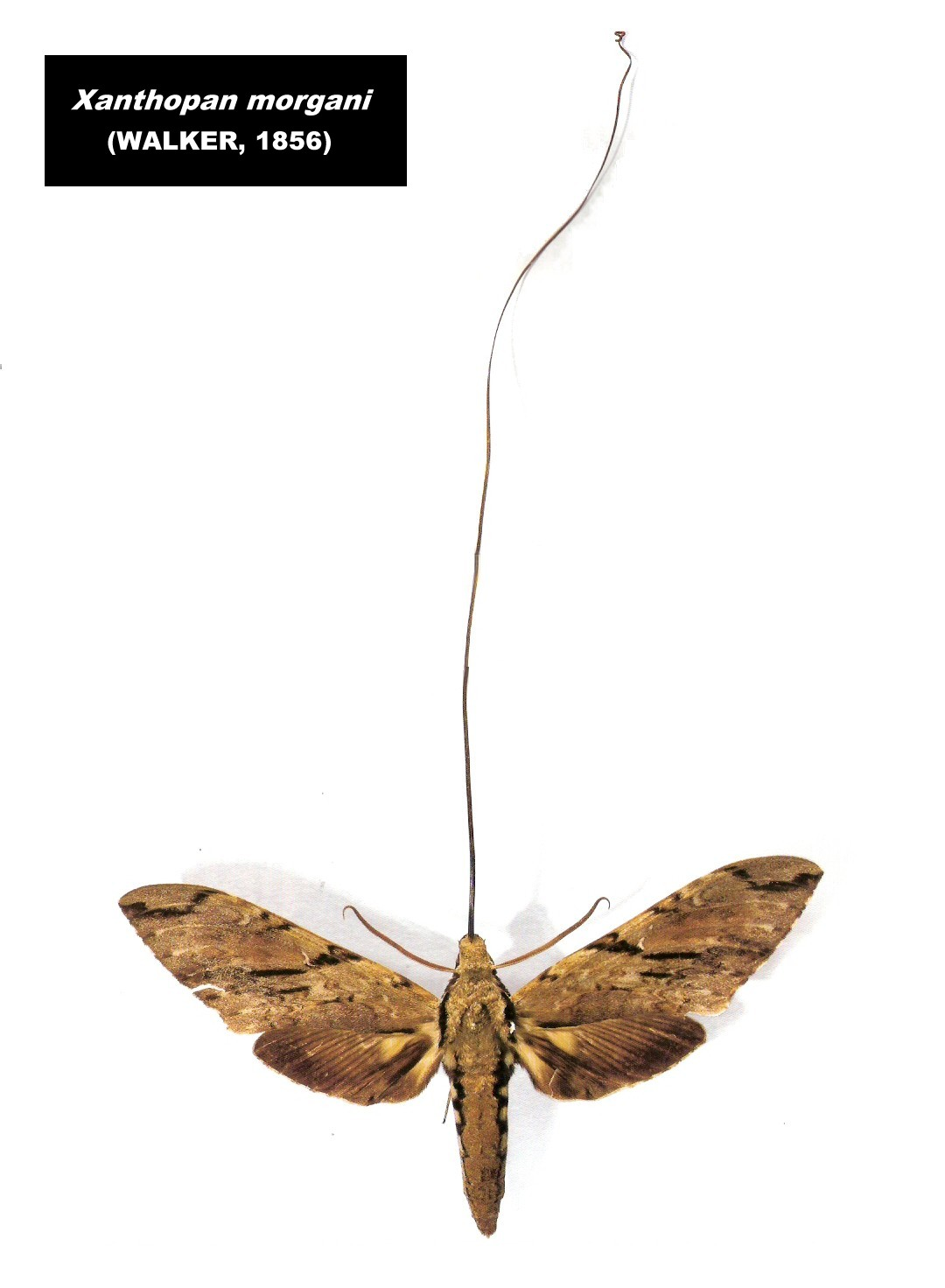

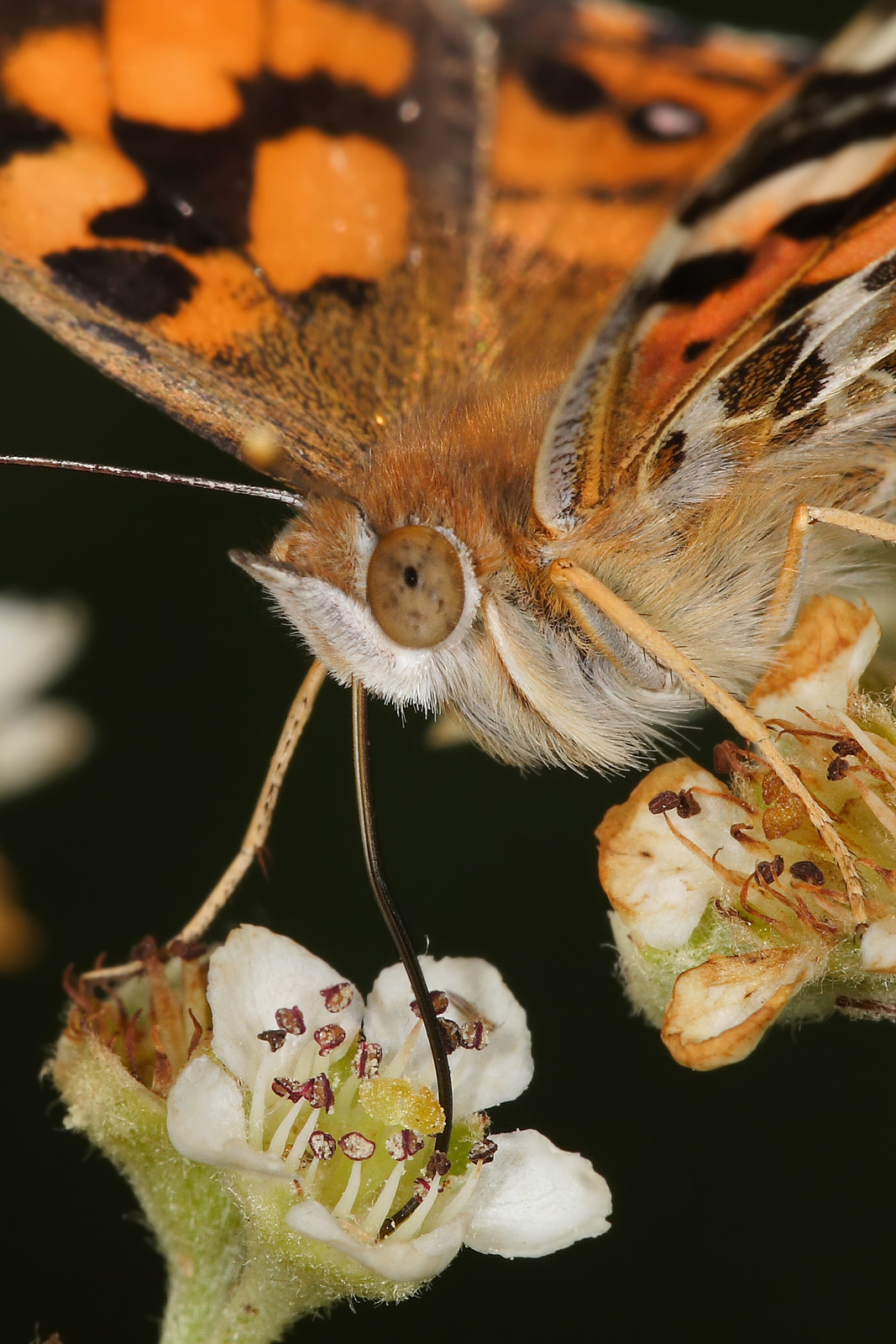

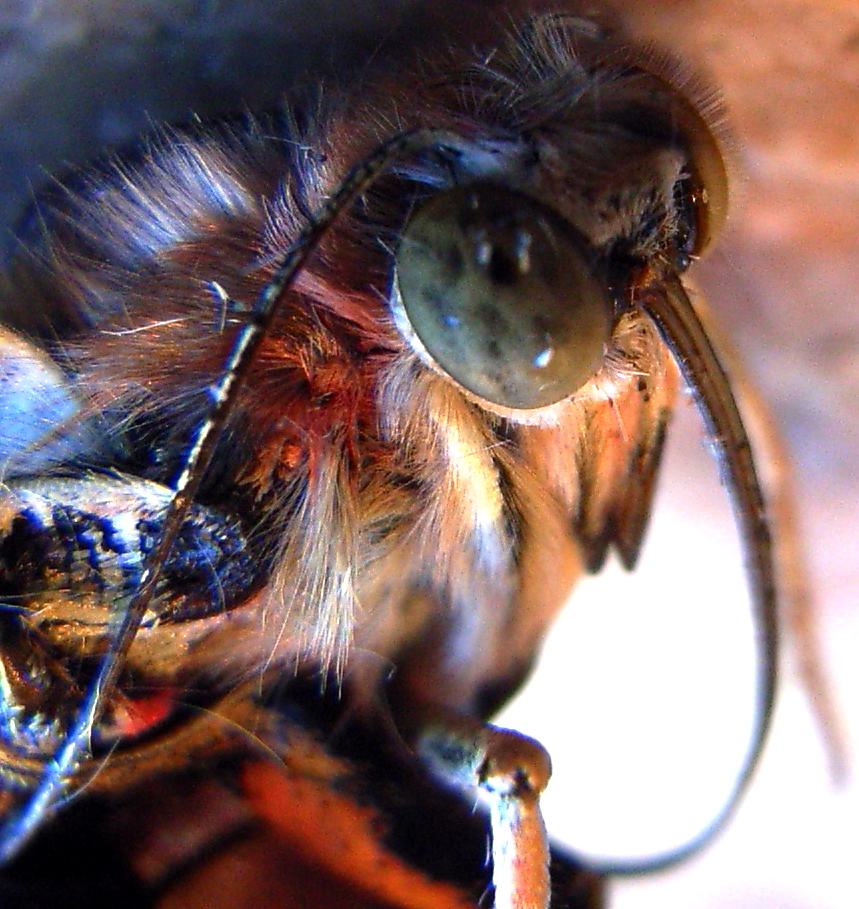

=== Sponging ===
The mouthparts of insects that feed on fluids are modified in various ways to form a tube through which liquid can be drawn into the mouth and usually another through which saliva passes. The muscles of the cibarium or pharynx are strongly developed to form a pump. In nonbiting flies, the mandibles are absent and other structures are reduced; the labial palps have become modified to form the labellum, and the maxillary palps are present, although sometimes short. In Brachycera, the labellum is especially prominent and used for sponging liquid or semiliquid food. The labella are a complex structure consisting of many grooves, called pseudotracheae, which sop up liquids. Salivary secretions from the labella assist in dissolving and collecting food particles so they can be more easily taken up by the pseudotracheae or laid their egg on the suitable media; this is thought to occur by capillary action. The liquid food is then drawn up from the pseudotracheae through the food channel into the esophagus.

The mouthparts of bees are of a chewing and lapping-sucking type. Lapping is a mode of feeding in which liquid or semiliquid food adhering to a protrusible organ, or "tongue", is transferred from substrate to mouth. In the honey bee (Hymenoptera: Apidae: Apis mellifera), the elongated and fused labial glossae form a hairy tongue, which is surrounded by the maxillary galeae and the labial palps to form a tubular proboscis containing a food canal. In feeding, the tongue is dipped into the nectar or honey, which adheres to the hairs, and then is retracted so the adhering liquid is carried into the space between the galeae and labial palps. This back-and-forth glossal movement occurs repeatedly. Movement of liquid to the mouth results from the action of the cibarial pump, facilitated by each retraction of the tongue pushing liquid up the food canal either for feeding requirements or to have a suitable media for laying their egg.

Sponging mouthparts

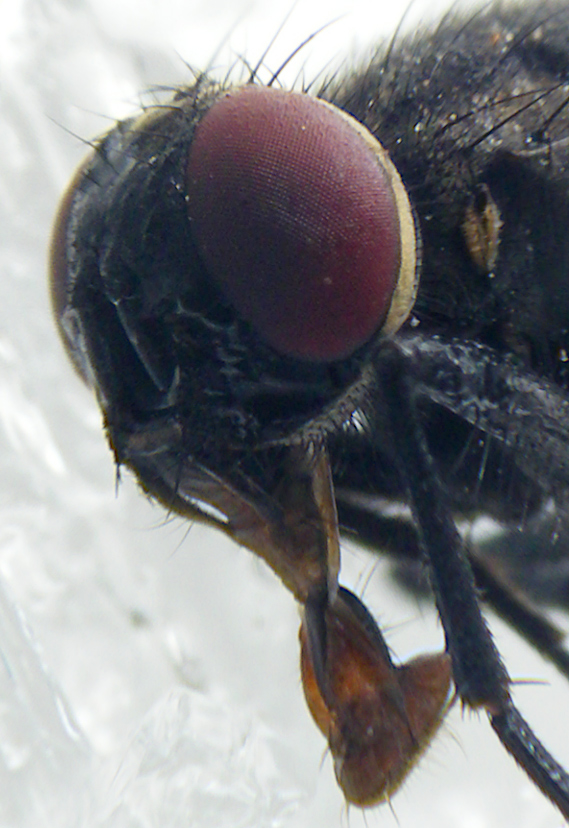

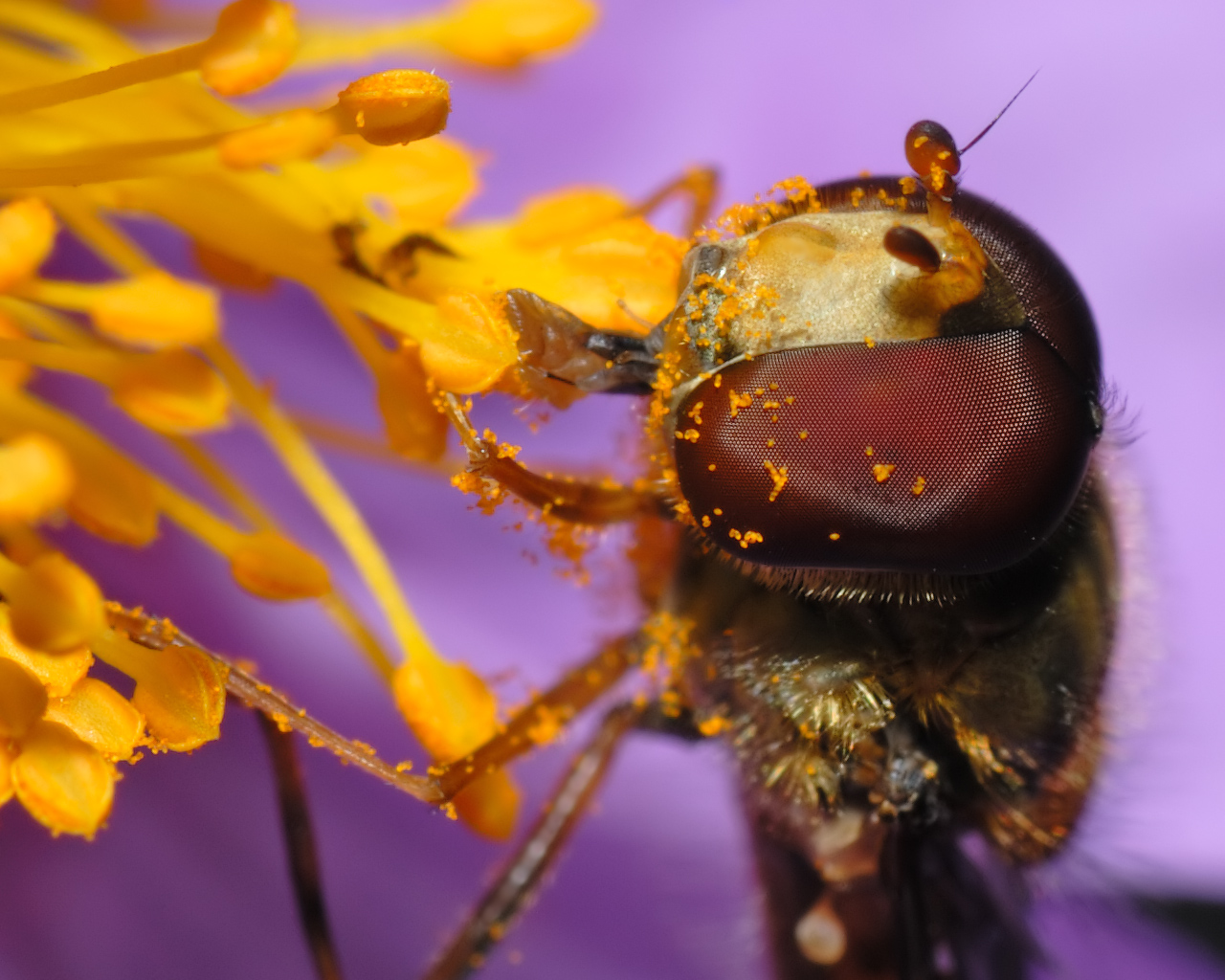

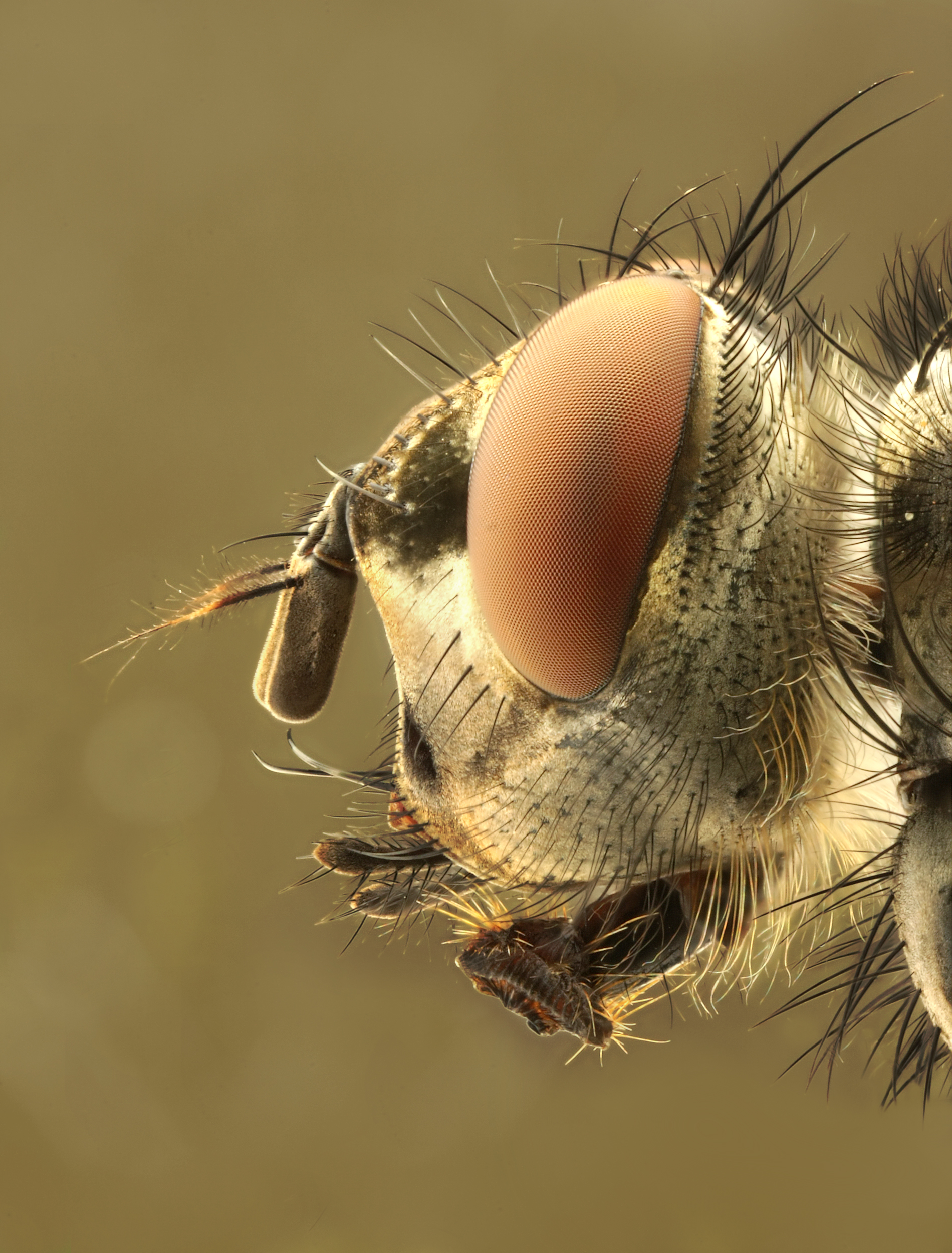
