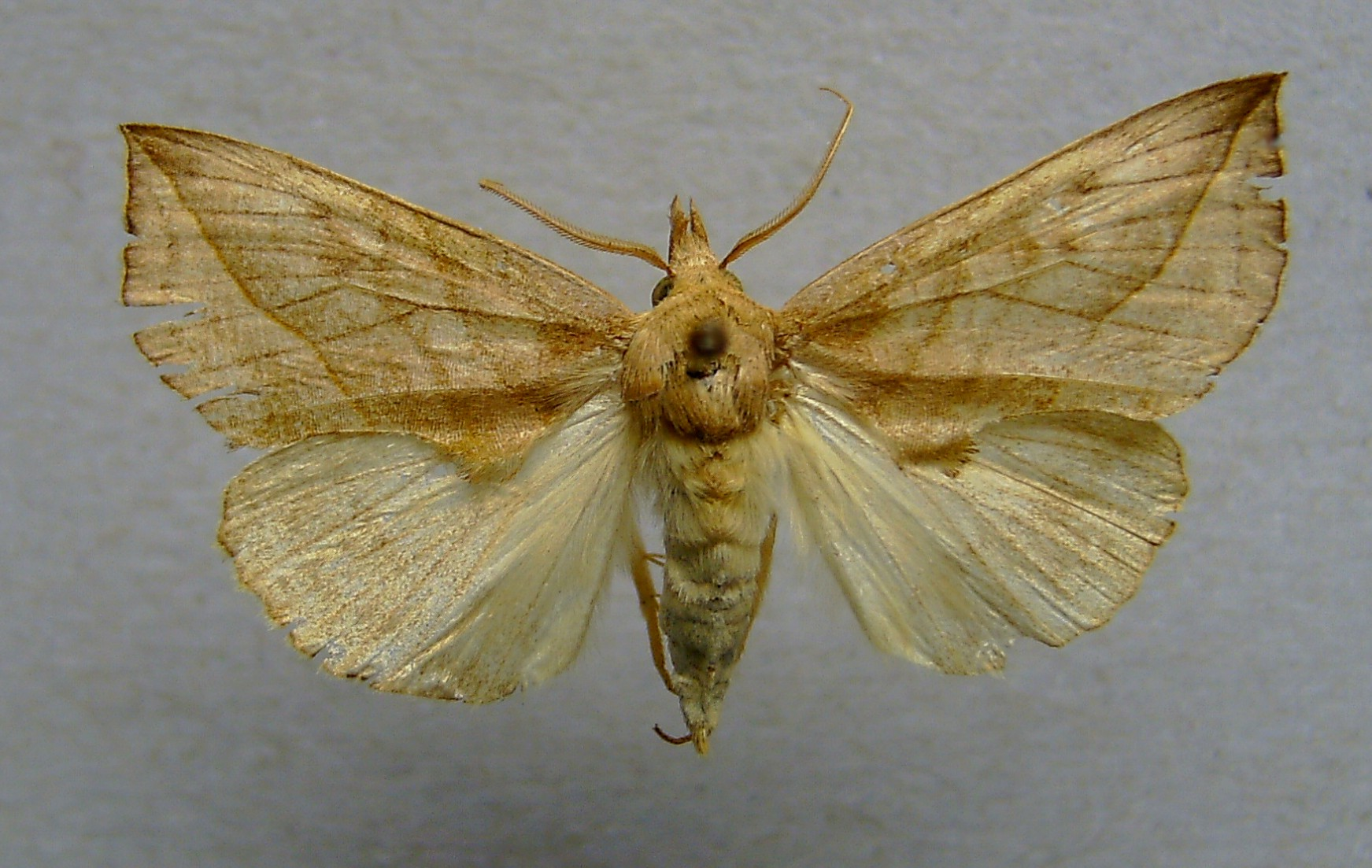
- Calyptra thalictri

Scientific classification
- Kingdom: Animalia
- Phylum: Arthropoda
- Clade: Pancrustacea
- Class: Insecta
- Order: Lepidoptera
- Superfamily: Noctuoidea
- Family: Erebidae
- Subfamily: Calpinae
- Tribe: Calpini; Boisduval, 1840

= Calpini =

Tribe of moths

The Calpini are a tribe of fruit-piercing moths in the family Erebidae; formerly they were included in the family Noctuidae. The proboscis of the adult moths of this tribe is pointed and barbed, allowing the moth to pierce the skin of fruit to drink the juice. The vampire moths in the genus Calyptra can pierce mammal skin to drink blood.

== Genera ==
- Africalpe Krüger, 1939
- Calyptra Ochsenheimer, 1816
- Ferenta Walker, [1858]
- Gonodonta Hübner, 1818
- Graphigona Walker, [1858]
- Oraesia Guenée, In Boisduval and Guenée, 1852b
- Plusiodonta Guenée, In Boisduval and Guenée, 1852b
- Tetrisia Walker, 1867
