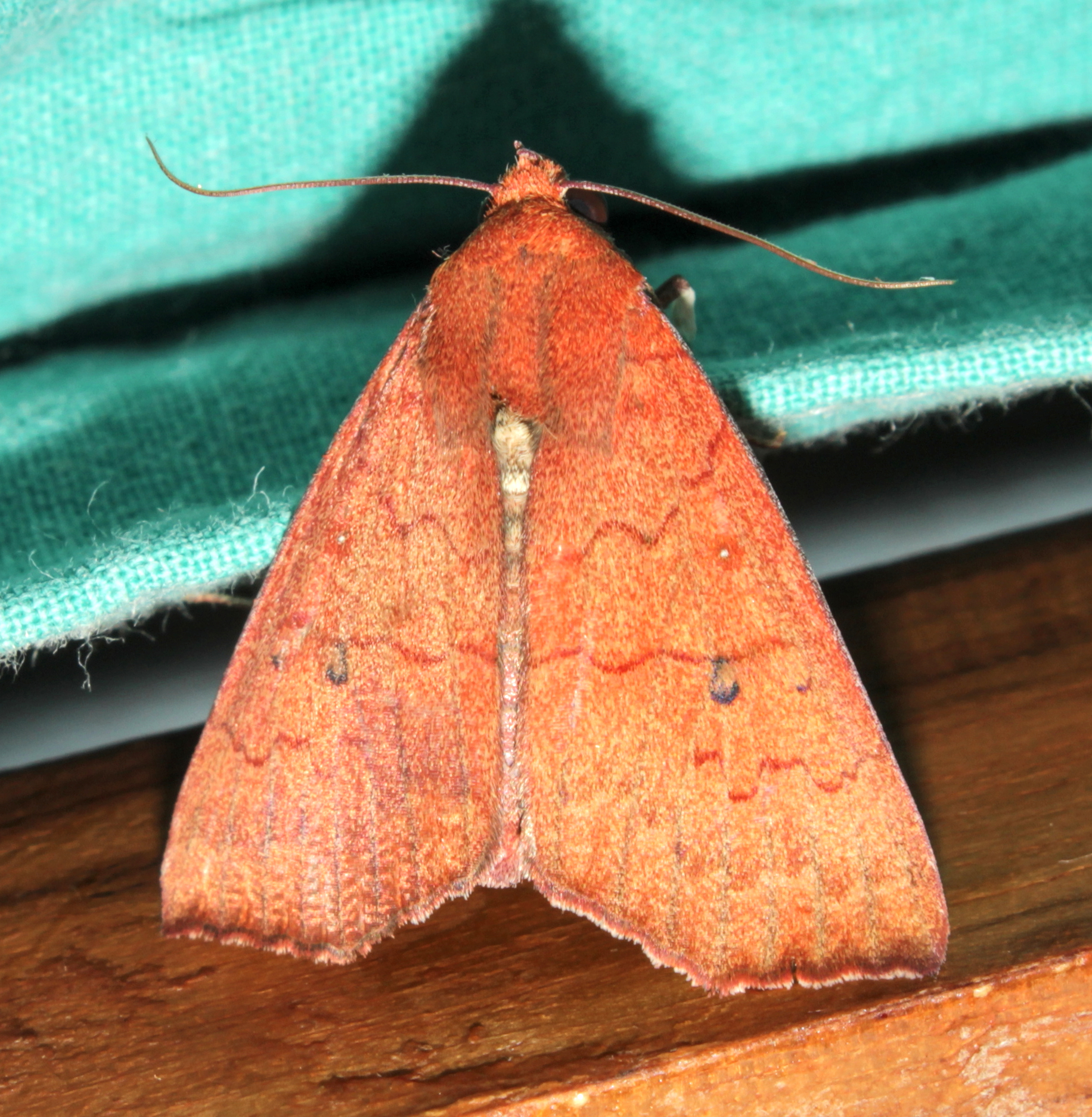
- In Kanjirappally, Kerala

Scientific classification
- Kingdom: Animalia
- Phylum: Arthropoda
- Class: Insecta
- Order: Lepidoptera
- Superfamily: Noctuoidea
- Family: Erebidae
- Genus: Anomis
- Species: A. fulvida

Binomial name
- Anomis fulvida Guenée, 1852

Synonyms
- Anomis albipuncta Snellen, 1880; Anomis cuprina Walker, 1865; Anomis guttanivis (Walker, 1858); Gonitis inducens (Walker, 1857); Euperia nagaloa (Mabille & Vuillot, 1890)

= Anomis fulvida =

Species of moth

Anomis fulvida is a moth of the family Erebidae first described by Achille Guenée in 1852. It is found in Australia, African countries like Sierra Leone, South Africa, Tanzania, and Asian countries like Sri Lanka.

== Biology ==
Caterpillars are known to feed on Abutilon, Alcea rosea, Bombax, Gossypium, Hibiscus, Citrus, Sida and Urena lobata. It is a major pest of cotton in Australia.

== Subspecies ==
Two subspecies are found including the nominate subspecies.

- Anomis fulvida fulvida Guenée, 1852
- Anomis fulvida griseolineata Warren, 1913
