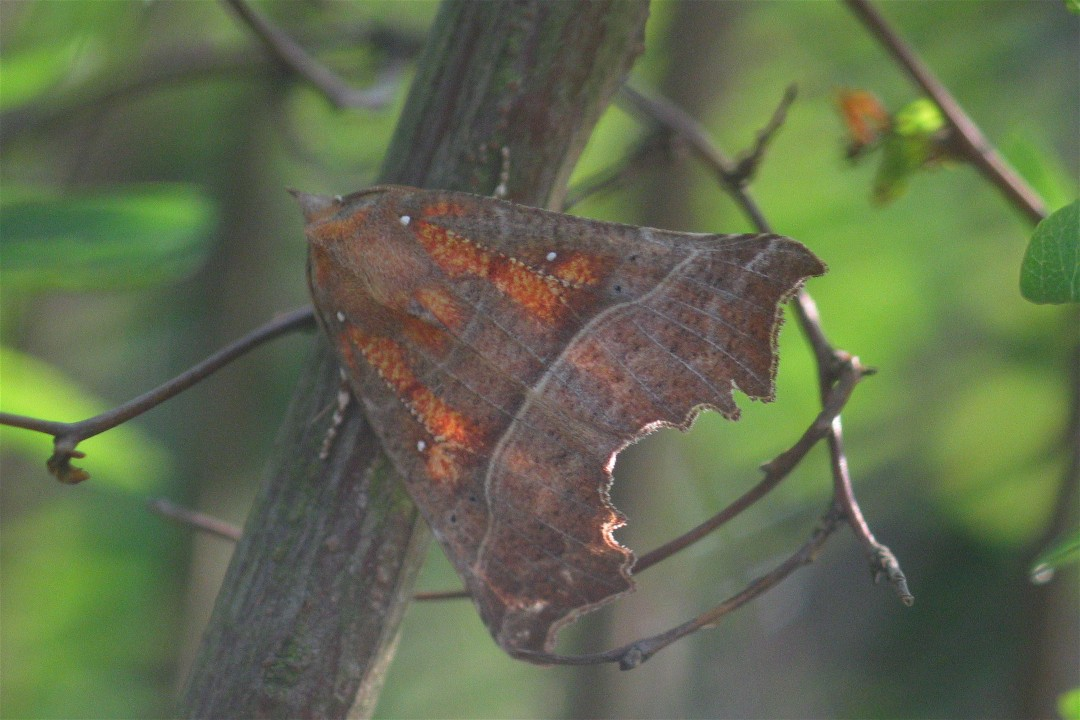
- Scoliopteryx libatrix

Scientific classification
- Kingdom: Animalia
- Phylum: Arthropoda
- Clade: Pancrustacea
- Class: Insecta
- Order: Lepidoptera
- Superfamily: Noctuoidea
- Family: Erebidae
- Subfamily: Scoliopteryginae
- Tribe: Scoliopterygini
- Genus: Scoliopteryx; Germar, 1810

Synonyms
- Pterodonta Reichenbach, 1817; Ephemias Hübner, [1821]; Euphais Hübner, 1822; Gonoptera Berthold, 1827

= Scoliopteryx =

Genus of moths

Scoliopteryx is a genus of moths in the family Erebidae. The genus was erected by Ernst Friedrich Germar in 1810.

== Species ==
- Scoliopteryx libatrix (Linnaeus, 1758) – the herald
- Scoliopteryx aksuana Sheljuzhko, 1955
