= Anomis figlina =

Scientific classification
- Domain: Eukaryota
- Kingdom: Animalia
- Phylum: Arthropoda
- Class: Insecta
- Order: Lepidoptera
- Superfamily: Noctuoidea
- Family: Erebidae
- Subfamily: Scoliopteryginae
- Genus: Anomis
- Species: A. figlina

Binomial name
- Anomis figlina Butler, 1889

Species of moth

Anomis figlina is a moth of the family Erebidae first described by Arthur Gardiner Butler in 1889. It is found in Sri Lanka, India, Australia and Japan.

Its wingspan is about 4 cm. The forewings are rusty brown with a purplish sheen. A black-outlined dark area is found near the middle of the wing. Several dark zigzag transverse lines also found on the forewings. The hindwings pale grey brown. Caterpillars are known to feed on many Greiwa species such as Grewia paniculata and Grewia tiliaefolia.
