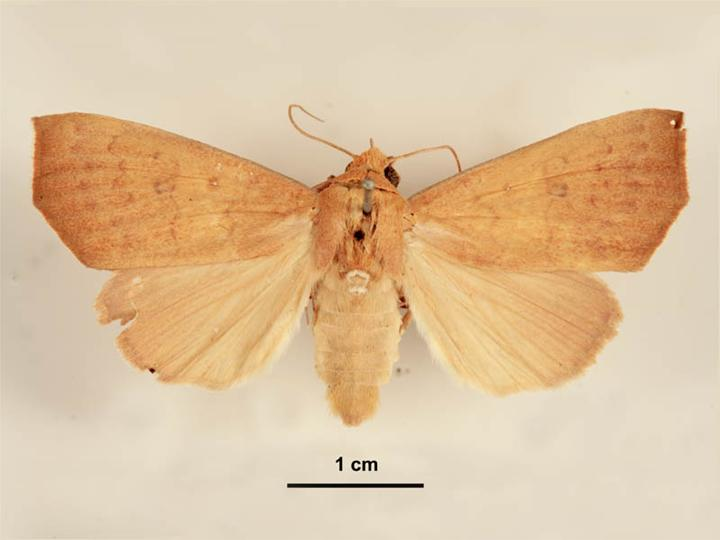
- Female, dorsal view
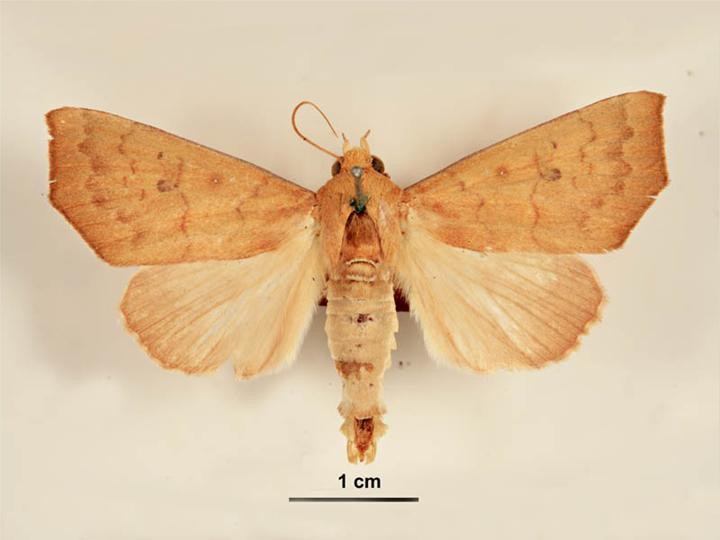
- Male, dorsal view

Scientific classification
- Domain: Eukaryota
- Kingdom: Animalia
- Phylum: Arthropoda
- Class: Insecta
- Order: Lepidoptera
- Superfamily: Noctuoidea
- Family: Erebidae
- Subfamily: Scoliopteryginae
- Genus: Anomis
- Species: A. planalis

Binomial name
- Anomis planalis (C. Swinhoe, 1902)

Synonyms
- Molopa planalis C. Swinhoe, 1902; Churia thermodes Lower, 1903; Antarchaea chionosticta Atherton, 1932; Antarchaea chionosticha Turner, 1932; Anomis microphrica Turner, 1933

= Anomis planalis =

Species of moth

Anomis planalis, the common cotton looper, is a moth of the family Erebidae. The species was first described by Charles Swinhoe in 1902. It is found in northern Australia.

The wingspan is about 28 mm. Adult forewing span c. 40 mm for females and 45 mm for males.

Larvae are a pest of various Malvaceae species, including Hibiscus cannabinus and Gossypium hirsutum, as well as okra, Abutilon species and tomato.

== Gallery ==
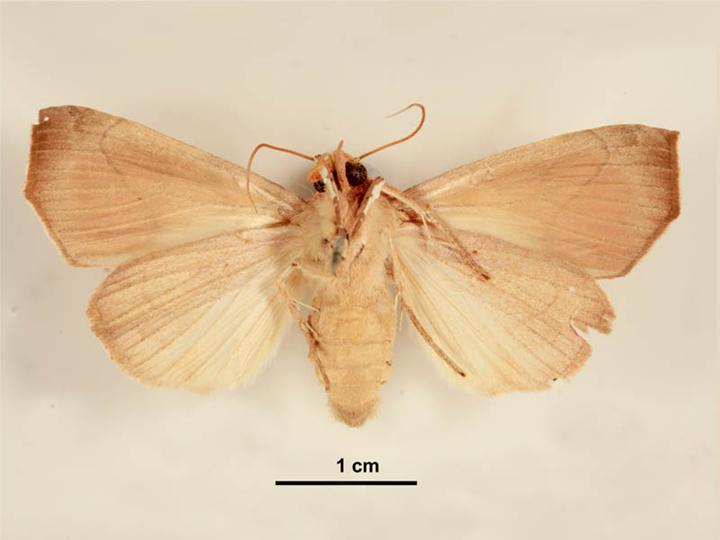
Female ventral view

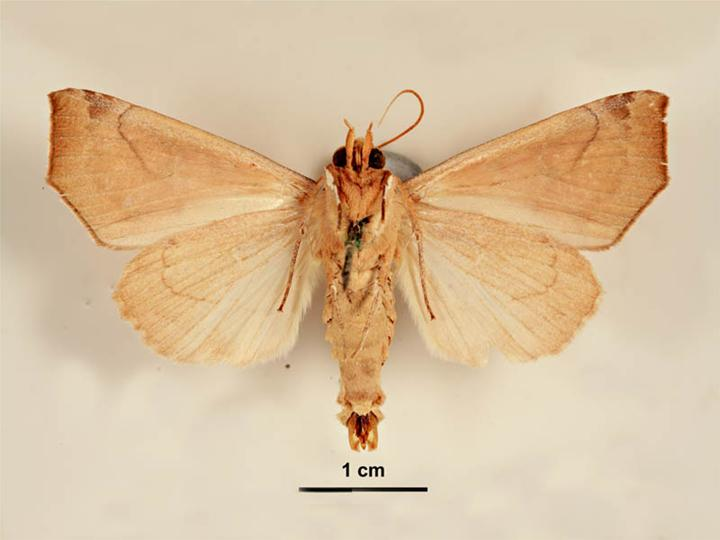
Male ventral view
