= Anomis texana =

Scientific classification
- Kingdom: Animalia
- Phylum: Arthropoda
- Clade: Pancrustacea
- Class: Insecta
- Order: Lepidoptera
- Superfamily: Noctuoidea
- Family: Erebidae
- Tribe: Anomini
- Genus: Anomis
- Species: A. texana

Binomial name
- Anomis texana Riley, 1885

Species of moth

Anomis texana is a species of moth in the family Erebidae. It is found in North America.

The MONA or Hodges number for Anomis texana is 8550.
