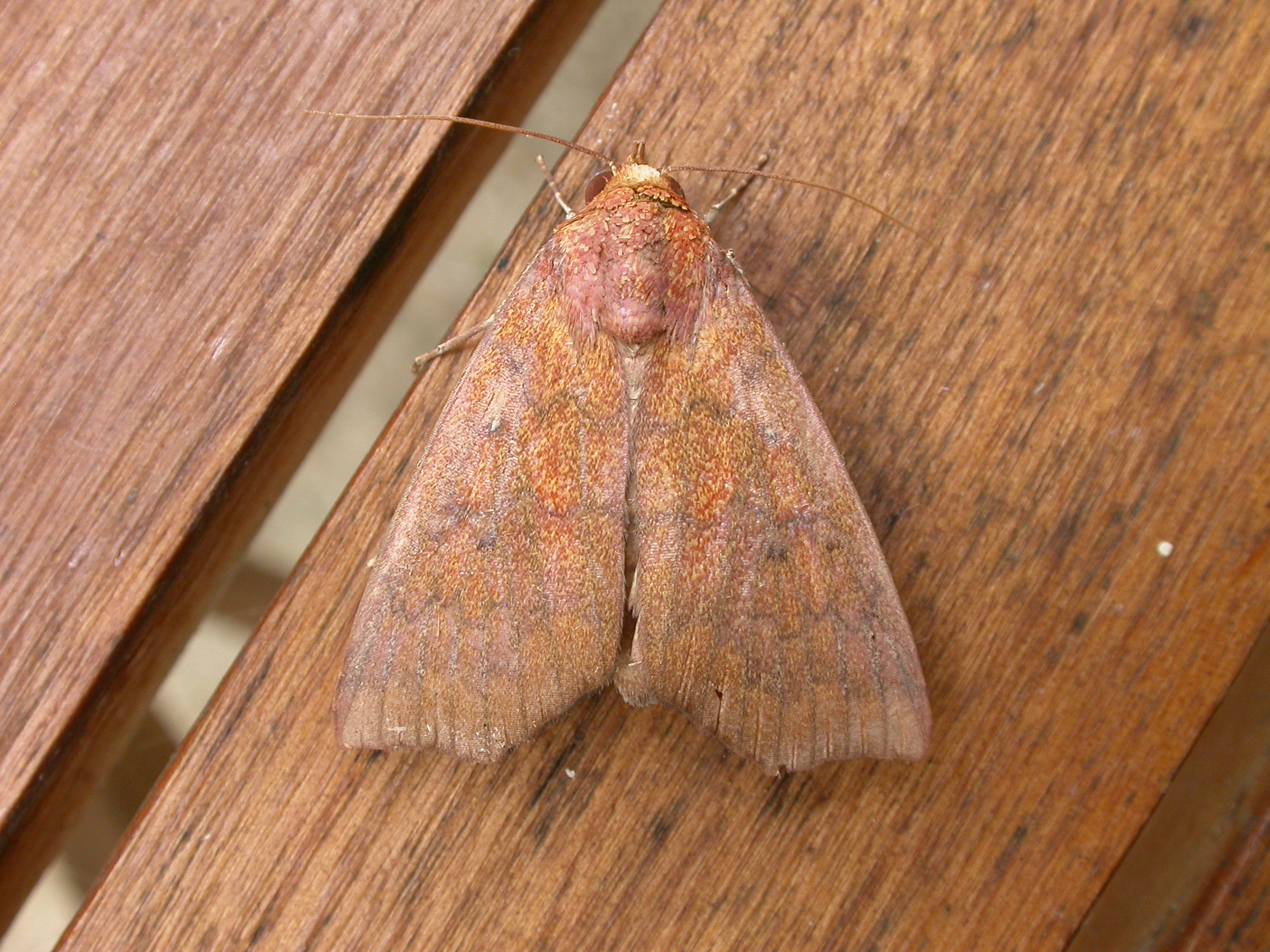

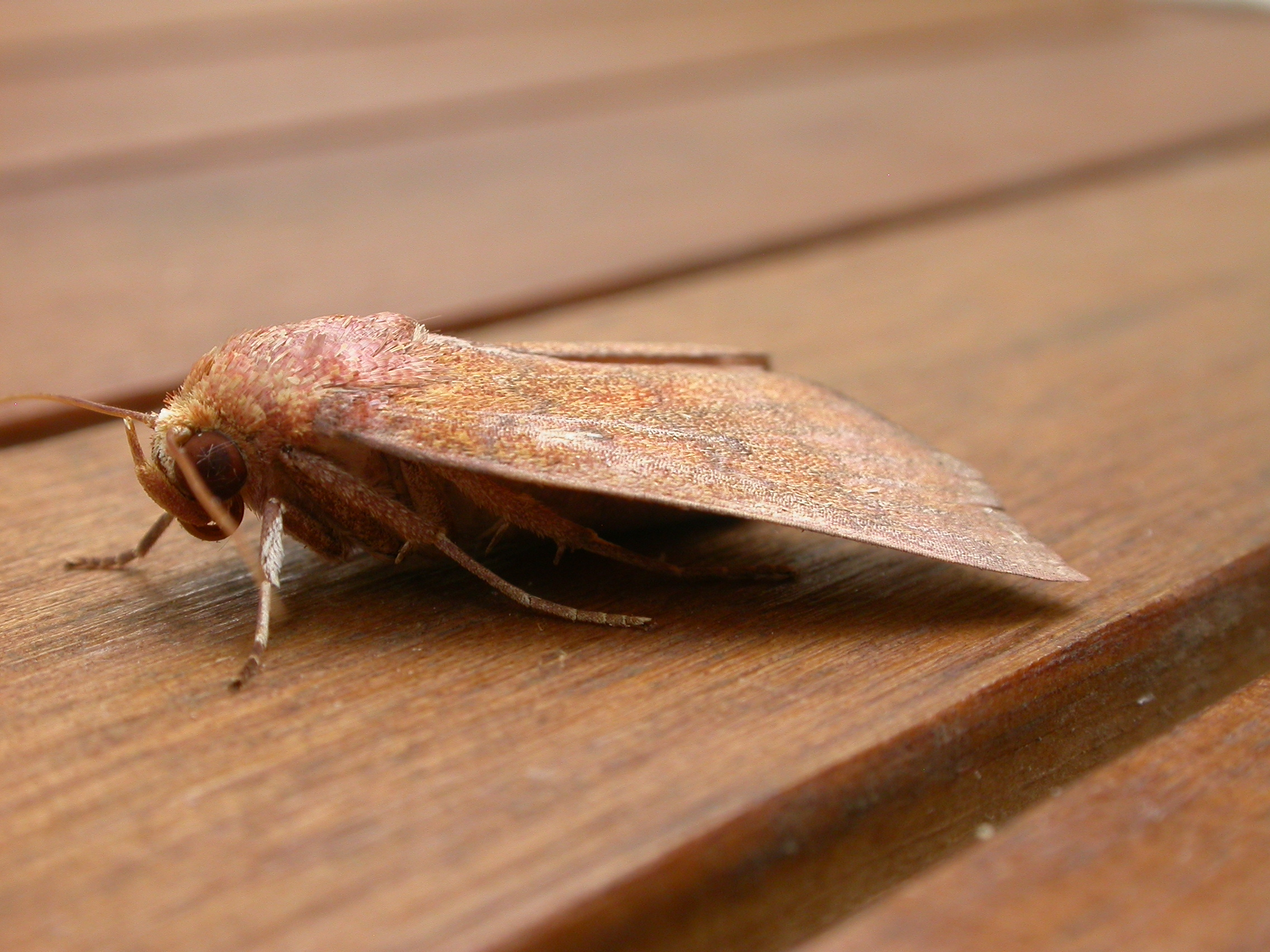

Scientific classification
- Kingdom: Animalia
- Phylum: Arthropoda
- Class: Insecta
- Order: Lepidoptera
- Superfamily: Noctuoidea
- Family: Erebidae
- Genus: Anomis
- Species: A. nigritarsis

Binomial name
- Anomis nigritarsis (Walker 1858)

Synonyms
- Rusicada nigritarsis Walker, [1858]; Gonitis xanthochroa Butler, 1886; Anomis amboinensis Swinhoe, 1920; Anomis albipuncta Snellen, 1880; Anomis ambonensis Swinhoe, 1920; Anomis irene Prout, 1929

= Anomis nigritarsis =

Species of moth

Anomis nigritarsis is a species of moth of the family Erebidae. It is found in Sri Lanka, India, China (Hainan), Taiwan, Borneo, Java, Sulawesi, the Moluccas, Queensland, New Caledonia, the Solomon Islands, Vanuatu, Fiji, Samoa and Tonga.

The larvae feed on Hibiscus and Urena species.

== Subspecies ==
- Anomis nigritarsis (Sri Lanka, India, Hainan, Taiwan, Borneo, Java)
- Anomis nigritarsis albipuncta Snellen, 1880 (Sulawesi, Moluccas, Queensland, New Caledonia)
- Anomis nigritarsis xanthochroa Butler, 1886 (Solomons, Vanuatu, Fiji, Samoa, Tonga)
