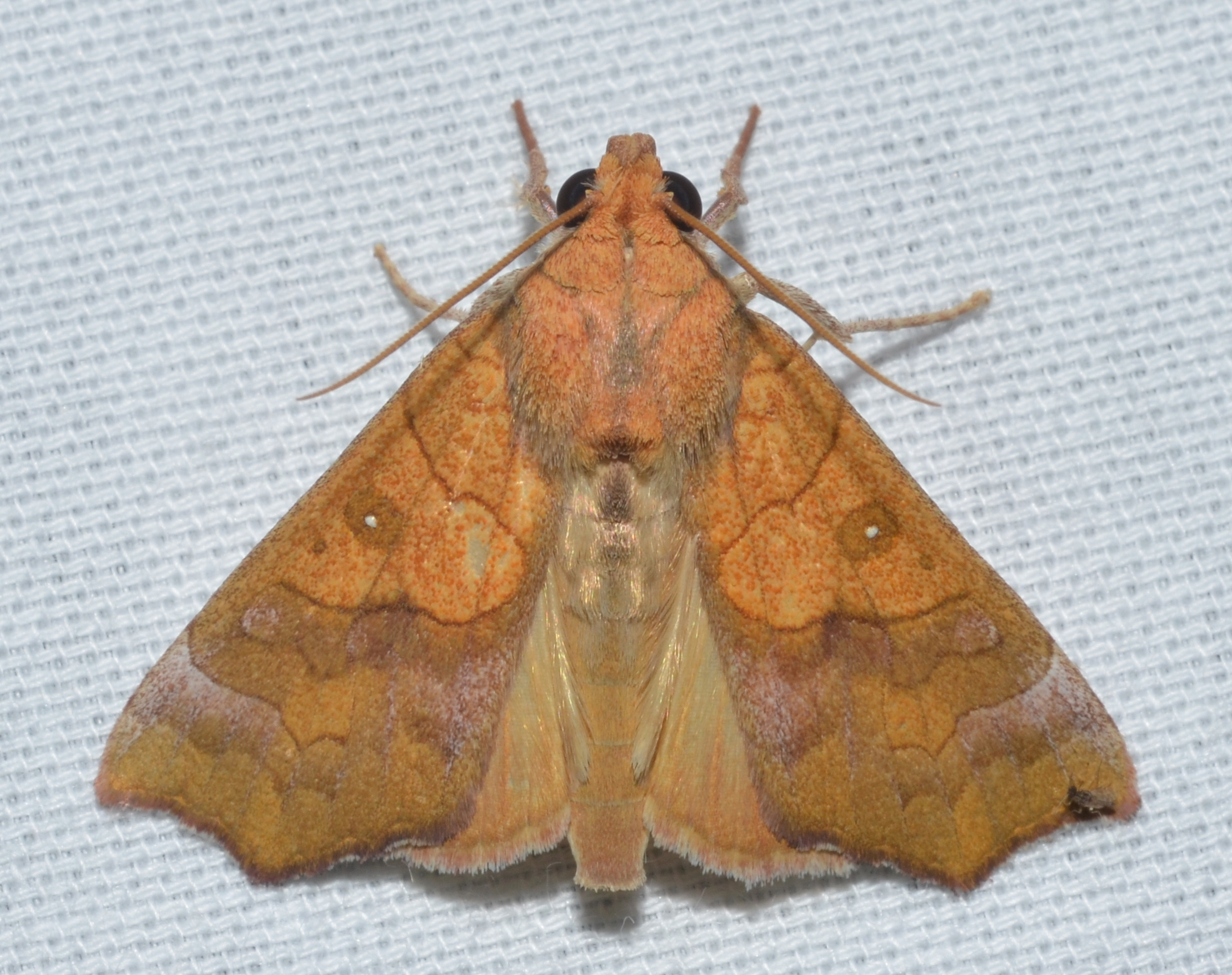

Scientific classification
- Domain: Eukaryota
- Kingdom: Animalia
- Phylum: Arthropoda
- Class: Insecta
- Order: Lepidoptera
- Superfamily: Noctuoidea
- Family: Erebidae
- Subfamily: Scoliopteryginae
- Genus: Anomis
- Species: A. erosa

Binomial name
- Anomis erosa Hübner, 1821

= Anomis erosa =

Species of moth

Anomis erosa, the yellow scallop moth or abutilon moth, is a moth of the family Erebidae. The species was first described by Jacob Hübner in 1821. It is found in south-eastern North America. It is mostly a southern species, but migrants reach Manitoba, Quebec and Maine.

The wingspan is about 27 mm.

The larvae feed on cotton, Hibiscus or rose of Sharon, hollyhock, marsh mallow, okra, rose-mallow, velvet leaf and other Malvaceae species.
