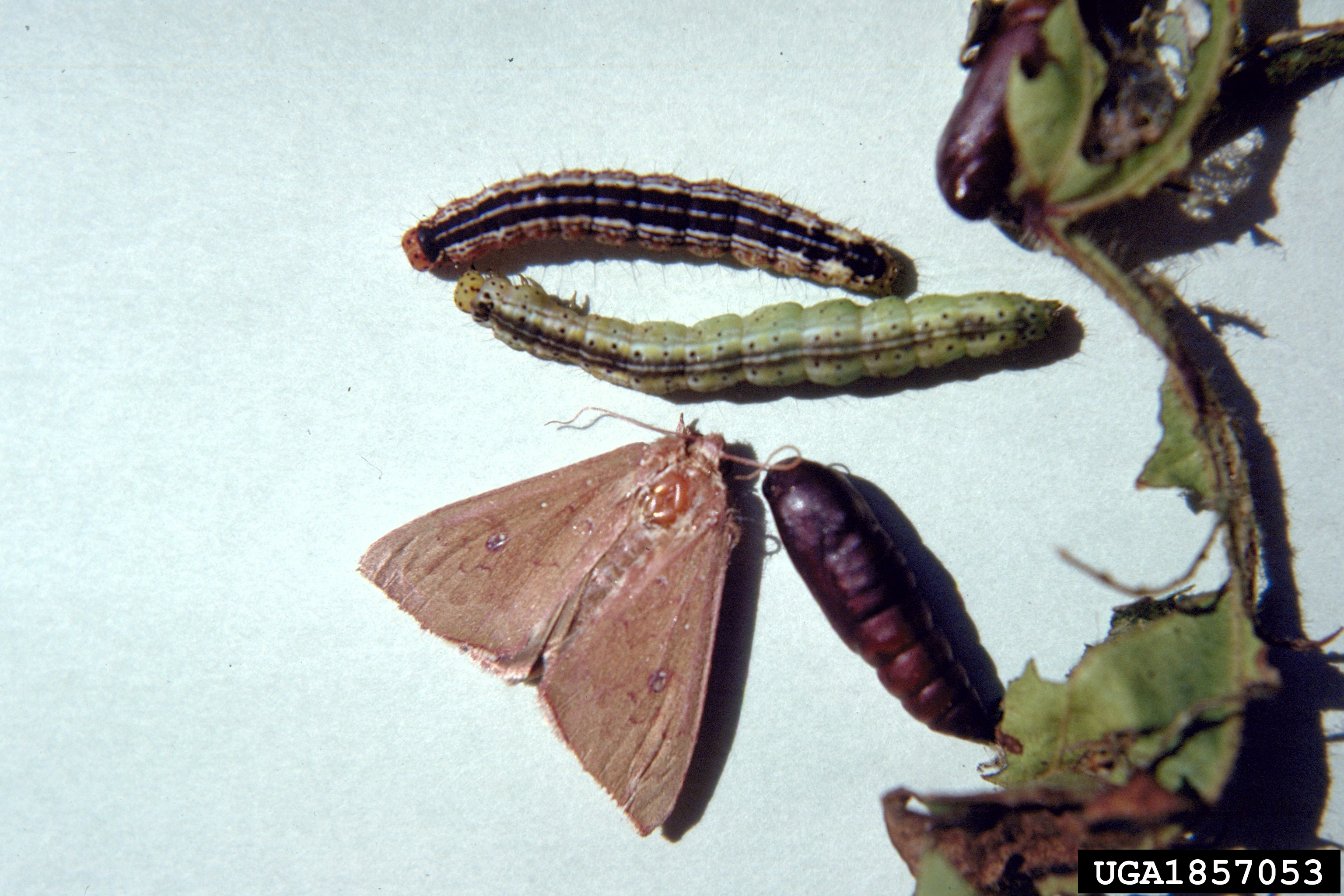

Scientific classification
- Kingdom: Animalia
- Phylum: Arthropoda
- Class: Insecta
- Order: Lepidoptera
- Superfamily: Noctuoidea
- Family: Erebidae
- Subfamily: Scoliopteryginae
- Tribe: Anomini
- Genus: Alabama; Grote, 1895
- Species: A. argillacea

Binomial name
- Alabama argillacea (Hübner, 1823)

Synonyms
- Generic: Eualabama Grote, 1896; Specific: Aletia argillacea Hübner, 1823; Alabama xylina (Say, 1828); Alabama bipunctina (Guenée, 1852); Alabama grandipuncta (Guenée, 1852)

= Alabama argillacea =

Genus and species of insect

Alabama argillacea, the cotton leafworm or cotton worm, is a moth of the family Erebidae. It is native to the New World, but has been extirpated from the United States and Canada, having not been recorded since 1998. In the Neotropics, it can be found from Mexico to northern Argentina. The larva is considered a pest of cotton. They feed on the leaves, twigs, and buds.

== Taxonomy ==
Alabama argillacea is the only species in the monotypic genus Alabama, which was erected by Augustus Radcliffe Grote in 1895. The species was first described by Jacob Hübner in 1823. The Global Lepidoptera Names Index gives this name as a synonym of Anomis Hübner, [1821]

== Description ==
The adult moth has light brown to orange wings. It wingspan varies from 25 to 35 mm. The larvae are up to 40 mm long, green or brownish with black and white stripes. They have a characteristic pattern of black dots on each segment.

== Life cycle ==
Alabama argillacea is a specialist feeder on Gossypieae, which includes cotton and its close relatives. Like other anomine erebids, its distribution is primarily tropical and only migrates north in the summer and fall under favorable conditions. Its eggs are sensitive and cannot tolerate any amount of frost in the winter, restricting the adults to historically spend the winter in Florida and Texas. However, its eggs may have never overwintered at all in the United States. Any adults which found themselves up north in the fall would have died by the first frost. Females lay an average of 400 eggs, which is unusually high for a noctuoid.

The entirety of the damage done to cotton is done by the larvae. Young instars feed primarily the underside of the leaves, skeletonizing them as they feed. Older instars move vertically and feed on the younger, fresher foliage near the bolls and sometimes on the bolls themselves. Depending on latitude, two to eight generations could have occurred in the United States each year. This made them an especially dangerous pest, as they fed year-round in some locations. In especially bad years, the larvae destroyed over a third of cotton crops. This resulted in the United States losing almost $30 million a year in lost profits (over $700 million in today's terms). Adults feed at flowers of many different species, but are probably not significant pollinators. Being a migratory species, the population of Alabama argillacea varied drastically from year-to-year and even location-to-location. No reliable records of A. argillacea exist from before 1793. The largest outbreaks occurred in 1804, 1825, 1846, 1868, and 1873, with intervening years having very minimal damage.

Much effort went into predicting when and where the caterpillars would strike next, but this research generated very little in terms of accurate predicting tools. When it struck, the destruction was nothing short of complete. In a letter to The American Agriculturalist in September 1846, farmer Thomas Affleck gave the following account of the destruction of A. argillacea:

The Caterpillar ... has utterly blighted the hopes of the cotton-planter for the present year, and produced most anxious fears for the future. I have heard from the greater part of the cotton-growing region—the news is all alike—the worm has destroyed the crop. I have no idea that any considerable portion of any State will escape. ... The fields present a most melancholy appearance by looking from the bluff at Natchez across the river to those fine plantations back of Vidalia, nothing is to be seen but the brown withered skeleton of the plant.

== Control ==
Before the advent of organic insecticides in the 1940s, outbreaks of Alabama argillacea went largely unchecked. Riley (1885) provides a detailed account of dozens of different methods used to attempt to kill Alabama argillacea. Some were simple, such as killing the larvae by hand or allowing poultry to roam through the cotton fields and eat the larvae they find. Later patented methods were more complicated: a sweeping-plow that brushed larvae off the leaves and buried them underground, light traps which used chemical compounds to kill adults, and soaking cotton seeds in poison under the false belief that the eggs were laid in the seeds. Still other methods were counterproductive. At least one farmer was so distraught by the damage caused A. argillacea that he built dozens of large bonfires around his fields in the hopes that the adult moths would be attracted to the light and destroy themselves in the flames. As it turned out, moths were attracted to the flames, but did not fly into them. All the farmer ended up doing was attracting additional moths to his property from miles away.

== Extirpation from North America ==
When large amounts of these insecticides were applied to cotton crops in southern Texas early in the cotton-growing season, the population of A. argillacea would take so long to build up such that any migration that occurred north later in the season became insignificant. It was not long after this that A. argillacea became rare to see north of the Rio Grande. By the 1970s some states were seeing the moth for the last time. The last confirmed record for New York came in 1977, for Pennsylvania in 1968, and for North Carolina in 1973. The last confirmed United States record was collected in October 1998 in Louisiana.

In addition to insecticides, state and local agencies created programs to destroy wild cotton when it was found on non-agricultural lands. This was done to prevent the spread and reservoir of cotton pests. Because of this, several native species of cotton are now on protected species lists. Finally, the Americas have seen a general shift away from cotton as a significant cash crop. This is because cotton is pesticide- and labor-intensive, returns less of a profit than alternative synthetic fiber products, and other crops have a higher demand.

== Status in Central and South America ==
A. argillacea is still a major pest in South America, where agricultural practices have not caught up yet to those elsewhere. When the same management strategies are applied in South America, it likely will not be long until A. argillacea becomes truly extinct. Its only hope may ride on its ability to utilize Hampea spp. as a host.

== See also ==
- New World screwworm (Cochliomyia hominivorax)
- Passenger pigeon (Ectopistes migratorius)
- Rocky Mountain locust (Melanoplus spretus)
