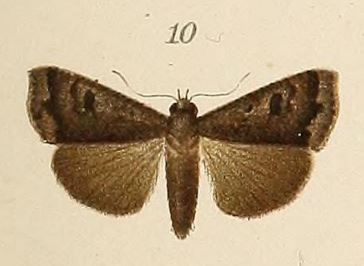

Scientific classification
- Domain: Eukaryota
- Kingdom: Animalia
- Phylum: Arthropoda
- Class: Insecta
- Order: Lepidoptera
- Superfamily: Noctuoidea
- Family: Erebidae
- Subfamily: Scoliopteryginae
- Genus: Anomis
- Species: A. grisea

Binomial name
- Anomis grisea (Pagenstecher, 1907)

Synonyms
- Amphipyra grisea Pagenstecher, 1907; Amphipyra bicolorata Pagenstecher, 1907

= Anomis grisea =

Species of moth

Anomis grisea is a moth of the family Erebidae. It is found in southern Madagascar.

The wingspan of the adults is about 28–30 mm.
