= Ossonoba =

Ossonoba may refer to:

- Ossonoba, a Roman city at the site of modern Faro, Portugal
- the former Diocese of Ossonoba, with see in that city, precursor of the Algarve bishopric of first Silves, (now) Faro
- Ossonoba (moth), a genus of moths
