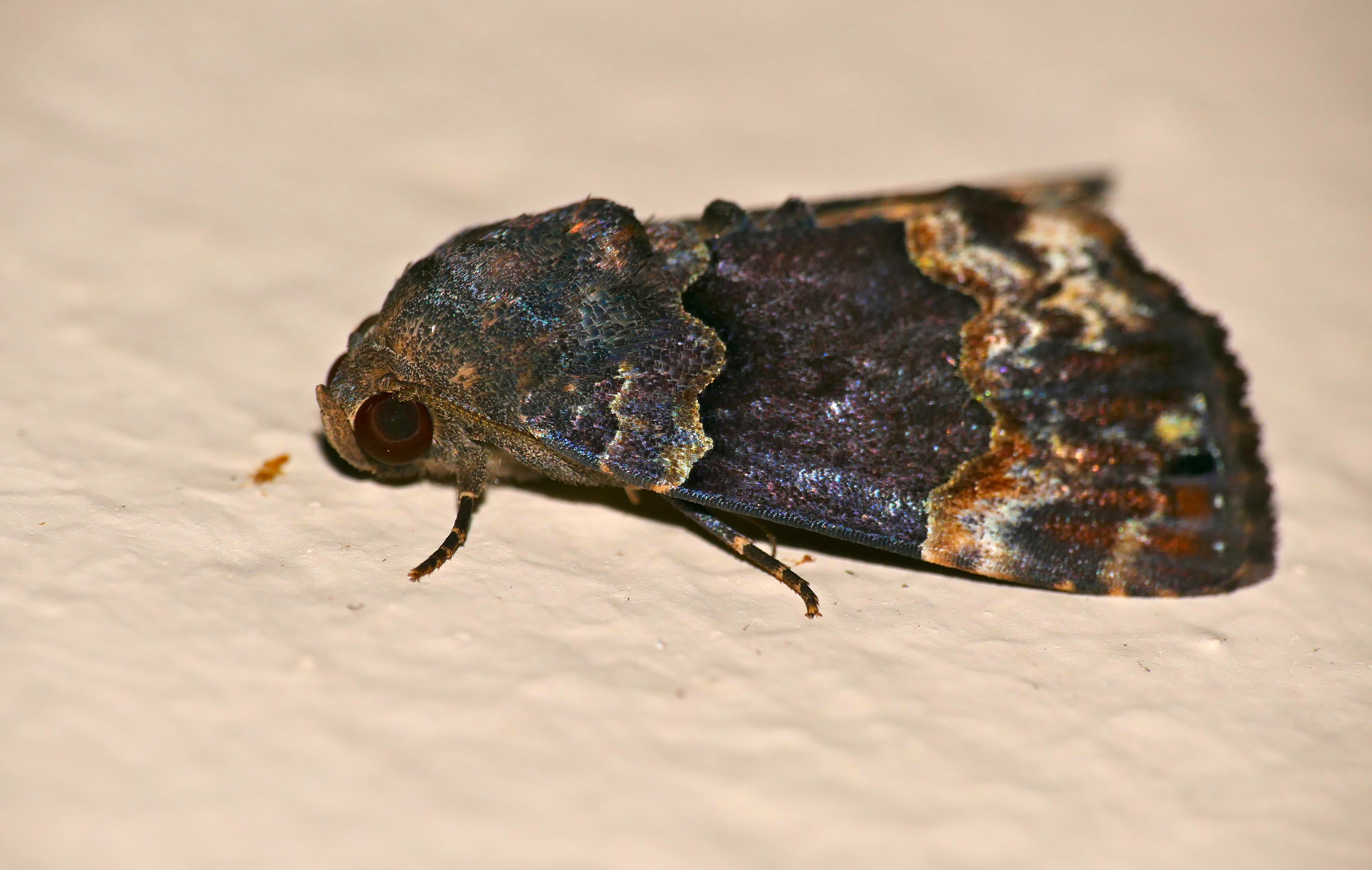
- Dinumma combusta

Scientific classification
- Kingdom: Animalia
- Phylum: Arthropoda
- Clade: Pancrustacea
- Class: Insecta
- Order: Lepidoptera
- Superfamily: Noctuoidea
- Family: Erebidae
- Subfamily: Scoliopteryginae
- Tribe: Anomini
- Genus: Dinumma; Walker, 1858

Synonyms
- Ortheaga Walker, 1865; Paralopha Bethune-Baker, 1908

= Dinumma =

Genus of moths

Dinumma is a genus of moths in the family Erebidae first described by Francis Walker in 1858.

== Description ==
Palpi smoothly scaled and upturned. Second joint reaching just above vertex of head, and third joint moderate length. Antennae minutely ciliated. Thorax smoothly scaled. Abdomen with a series of dorsal tufts. Tibia moderately hair. Forewings of nearly even width throughout, the apex and outer margin rounded. Hindwings with vein 5 from lower angle of cell.

== Species ==
- Dinumma deponens Walker, 1858 India, Thailand, China, Japan, Korea, introduced to the United States
- Dinumma combusta (Walker, 1865) Sundaland
- Dinumma hades Bethune-Baker, 1906 New Guinea
- Dinumma inagnulata Hampson, 1902 Sikkim
- Dinumma mediobrunnea Bethune-Baker, 1906 New Guinea
- Dinumma oxygrapha (Snellen, 1880) Singapore, Borneo, Bali, Dammer, Kei, Philippines, Sulawesi
- Dinumma placens Walker, 1858 Sri Lanka
- Dinumma rubiginea (Bethune-Baker, 1908) New Guinea
- Dinumma spiculata Holloway, 2005 Borneo
- Dinumma stygia Hampson, 1926 New Guinea
- Dinumma varians Butler, 1889 India (Himachal Pradesh)
