= Anomis luridula =

Scientific classification
- Kingdom: Animalia
- Phylum: Arthropoda
- Class: Insecta
- Order: Lepidoptera
- Superfamily: Noctuoidea
- Family: Erebidae
- Tribe: Anomini
- Genus: Anomis
- Species: A. luridula

Binomial name
- Anomis luridula Guenée, 1852

Species of moth

Anomis luridula is a moth species belonging to the Erebidae family. It is found in North America.

The MONA or Hodges number for Anomis luridula is 8549.

== Subspecies ==
These two subspecies belong to the species Anomis luridula:

- Anomis luridula luridula
- Anomis luridula professorum Schaus, 1923
