= Anomis impasta =

Scientific classification
- Kingdom: Animalia
- Phylum: Arthropoda
- Clade: Pancrustacea
- Class: Insecta
- Order: Lepidoptera
- Superfamily: Noctuoidea
- Family: Erebidae
- Tribe: Anomini
- Genus: Anomis
- Species: A. impasta

Binomial name
- Anomis impasta Guenée, 1852

Species of moth

Anomis impasta is a species of moth in the family Erebidae. It is found in North America.
