= Anomis hawaiiensis =

Scientific classification
- Domain: Eukaryota
- Kingdom: Animalia
- Phylum: Arthropoda
- Class: Insecta
- Order: Lepidoptera
- Superfamily: Noctuoidea
- Family: Erebidae
- Subfamily: Scoliopteryginae
- Genus: Anomis
- Species: A. hawaiiensis

Binomial name
- Anomis hawaiiensis (Butler, 1882)

Synonyms
- Gonitis hawaiiensis Butler, 1882

Species of moth

Anomis hawaiiensis is a moth of the family Erebidae. It was first described by Arthur Gardiner Butler in 1882. It is endemic to the Hawaiian islands of Kauai, Oahu and Hawaii.

The larvae feed on Hibiscus species (including Hibiscus tiliaceus) and Hibiscadelphus species. The caterpillar is a green, or sometimes reddish, semi-looper.
