= Cotton leafworm =

Cotton leafworm may refer to:

- Alabama argillacea
- Spodoptera litura
