= Anomis noctivolans =

Scientific classification
- Domain: Eukaryota
- Kingdom: Animalia
- Phylum: Arthropoda
- Class: Insecta
- Order: Lepidoptera
- Superfamily: Noctuoidea
- Family: Erebidae
- Subfamily: Scoliopteryginae
- Genus: Anomis
- Species: A. noctivolans

Binomial name
- Anomis noctivolans (Butler, 1880)

Synonyms
- Toxocampa noctivolans Butler, 1880; Cosmophila noctivolans

Species of moth

Anomis noctivolans is a moth of the family Erebidae. It was first described by Arthur Gardiner Butler in 1880. It is endemic to the Hawaiian islands of Kauai, Oahu, Molokai and Maui.

The larvae feed on Hibiscus and Sida species.
