= Anomis vulpicolor =

Scientific classification
- Kingdom: Animalia
- Phylum: Arthropoda
- Class: Insecta
- Order: Lepidoptera
- Superfamily: Noctuoidea
- Family: Erebidae
- Genus: Anomis
- Species: A. vulpicolor

Binomial name
- Anomis vulpicolor (Meyrick, 1928)

Synonyms
- Gonitis vulpicolor; Cosmophila vulpicolor Meyrick, 1928

Species of moth

Anomis vulpicolor is a moth of the family Erebidae. It was first described by Edward Meyrick in 1928. It is endemic to the Hawaiian islands of Oahu, Molokai and Hawaii. The larvae have been found to feed on Osteomeles anthyllidifolia. The caterpillar is characterised by four pairs of abdominal prolegs.

The species is considered likely extinct, with the last sighting occurring before 1960.
