= Anomis lophognatha =

Scientific classification
- Kingdom: Animalia
- Phylum: Arthropoda
- Clade: Pancrustacea
- Class: Insecta
- Order: Lepidoptera
- Superfamily: Noctuoidea
- Family: Erebidae
- Genus: Anomis
- Species: A. lophognatha

Binomial name
- Anomis lophognatha Hampson, 1926

Species of moth

Anomis lophognatha is a moth of the family Erebidae first described by George Hampson in 1926.

It is found in Madagascar, Mauritius and Réunion.
