= Anomis esocampta =

Scientific classification
- Kingdom: Animalia
- Phylum: Arthropoda
- Class: Insecta
- Order: Lepidoptera
- Superfamily: Noctuoidea
- Family: Erebidae
- Genus: Anomis
- Species: A. esocampta

Binomial name
- Anomis esocampta Hampson, 1926

Species of moth

Anomis esocampta is a moth of the family Erebidae. It was described by George Hampson in 1926. It is found on Fiji.
