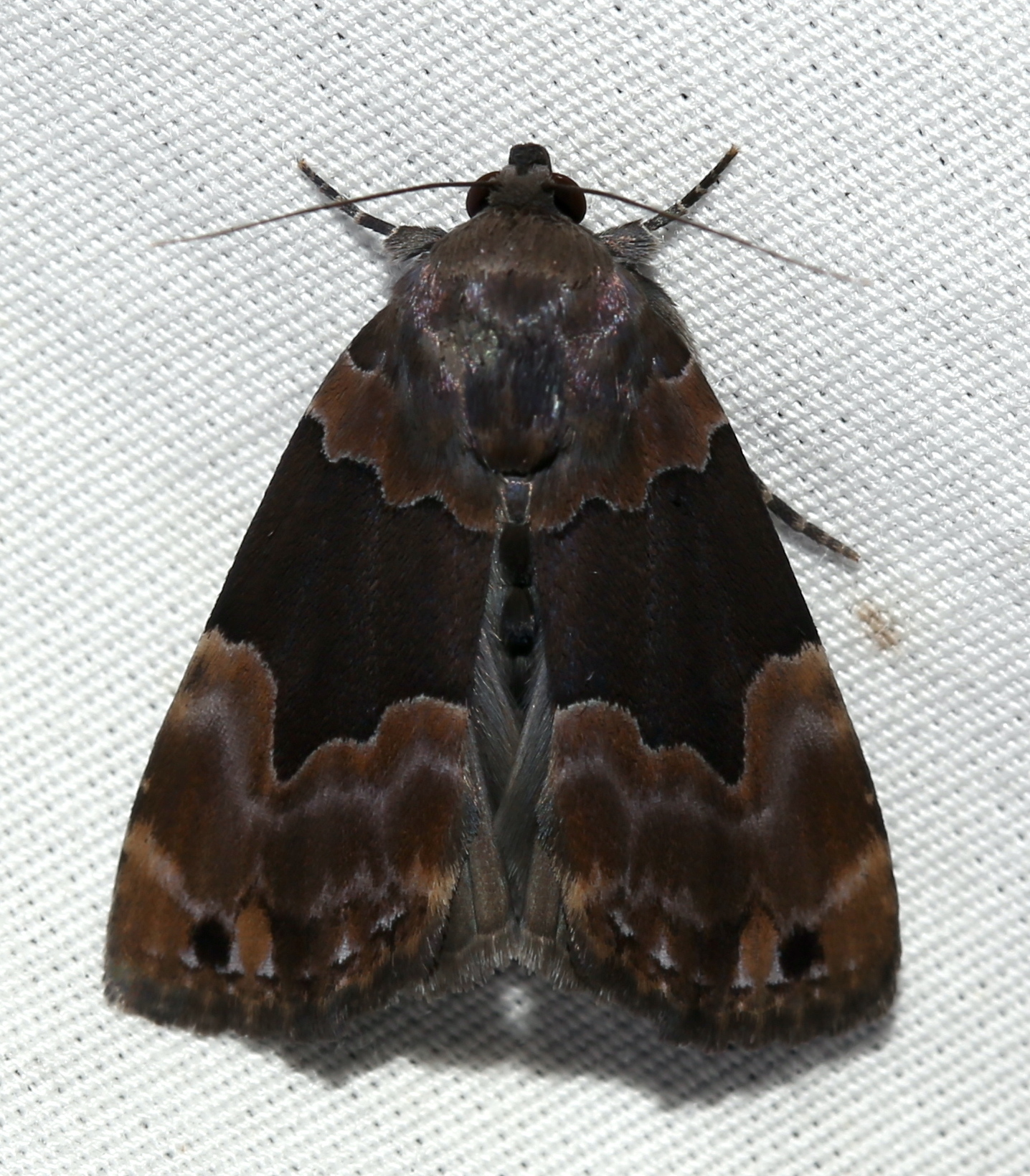

Scientific classification
- Kingdom: Animalia
- Phylum: Arthropoda
- Class: Insecta
- Order: Lepidoptera
- Superfamily: Noctuoidea
- Family: Erebidae
- Genus: Dinumma
- Species: D. deponens

Binomial name
- Dinumma deponens Walker, 1858

Synonyms
- Dichonia bipunctata Motschulsky, 1860; Amphipyra largeteaui Oberthur, 1884

= Dinumma deponens =

Species of moth

Dinumma deponens is a moth in the family Noctuidae first described by Francis Walker in 1858. It is found from India across eastern China to Japan, Korea and Thailand. A female specimen was taken in Morganton, Fannin County, in northern Georgia in 2012.

The larvae feed on Albizia species.
