= Ossonoba torpida =

Scientific classification
- Kingdom: Animalia
- Phylum: Arthropoda
- Clade: Pancrustacea
- Class: Insecta
- Order: Lepidoptera
- Superfamily: Noctuoidea
- Family: Erebidae
- Subfamily: Scoliopteryginae
- Tribe: Scoliopterygini
- Genus: Ossonoba; Walker, 1866
- Species: O. torpida

Binomial name
- Ossonoba torpida Walker, 1866

Species of moth

Ossonoba is a monotypic moth genus in the family Erebidae. Its only species, Ossonoba torpida, is found in Darjeeling, India. Both the genus and the species were first described by Francis Walker in 1866.
