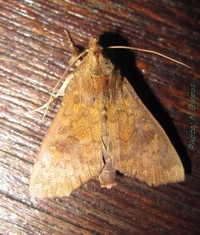

Scientific classification
- Kingdom: Animalia
- Phylum: Arthropoda
- Clade: Pancrustacea
- Class: Insecta
- Order: Lepidoptera
- Superfamily: Noctuoidea
- Family: Erebidae
- Genus: Anomis
- Species: A. campanalis

Binomial name
- Anomis campanalis (Mabille, 1880)

Synonyms
- Herminia campanalis Mabille, 1880

= Anomis campanalis =

Species of moth

Anomis campanalis is a moth of the family Erebidae first described by Paul Mabille in 1880.

It is found in Madagascar and Réunion.
