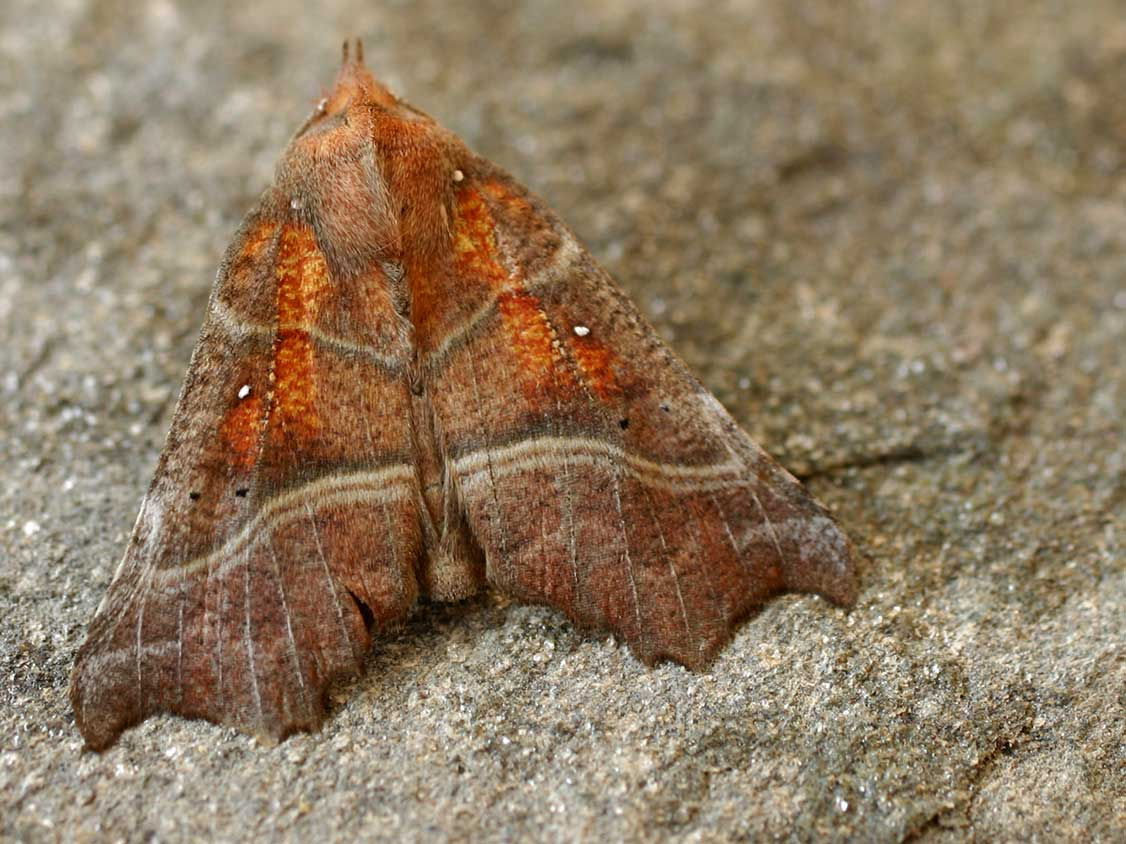

Scientific classification
- Kingdom: Animalia
- Phylum: Arthropoda
- Clade: Pancrustacea
- Class: Insecta
- Order: Lepidoptera
- Superfamily: Noctuoidea
- Family: Erebidae
- Genus: Scoliopteryx
- Species: S. libatrix

Binomial name
- Scoliopteryx libatrix (Linnaeus, 1758)

Synonyms
- Phalaena libatrix Linnaeus, 1758; Bombyx libatricus Haworth, 1803

= Herald (moth) =

The herald

Species of moth

The herald (Scoliopteryx libatrix) is a moth of the family Erebidae. The species was first described by Carl Linnaeus in his 1758 10th edition of Systema Naturae.

It is found throughout the Palearctic and Nearctic (Holarctic).

== Technical description and variation ==
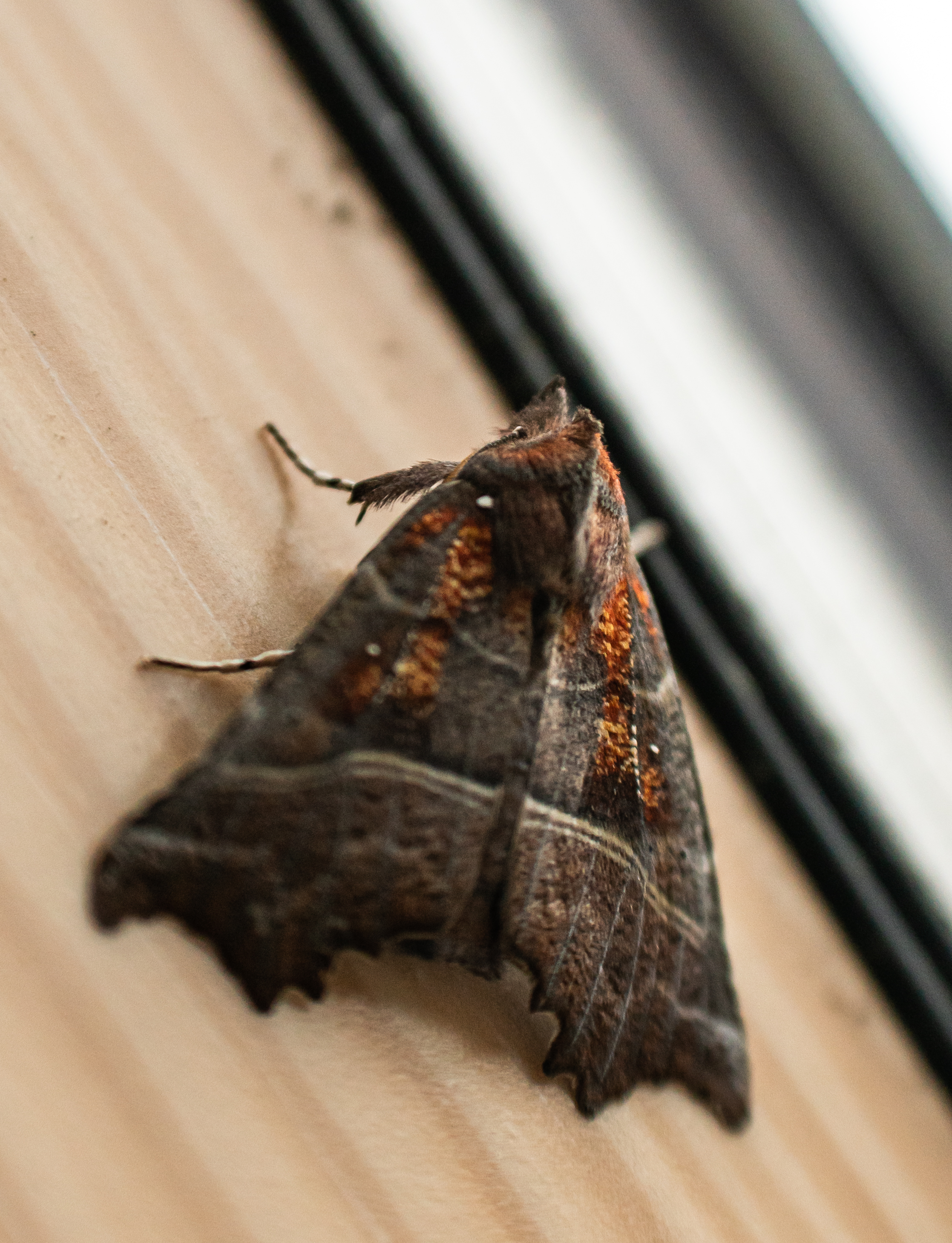
A photo of an adult herald moth

It has a wingspan of about 44 mm. The wings are ample; the forewing angled in the middle of the termen, concave between the angle and the acute apex. Forewing grey mixed with ochreous, with fuscous striae, posteriorly with a rosy tinge: the veins terminally whitish; an irregular median suffusion reaching from base to middle, orange red more or less mixed with yellow; inner and outer lines pale with dark edges; a white spot at base on median vein; a white dot represents the orbicular stigma; reniform formed of two black dots; hindwing fuscous, paler at base; ab. suffusa Tutt is a scarce dark form without the usual rosy tinge in the terminal area of forewing; ab. pallidior Spul. includes pale whitish grey looking examples; while pallida Spul. refers to pale, more yellowish specimens from Turkestan.

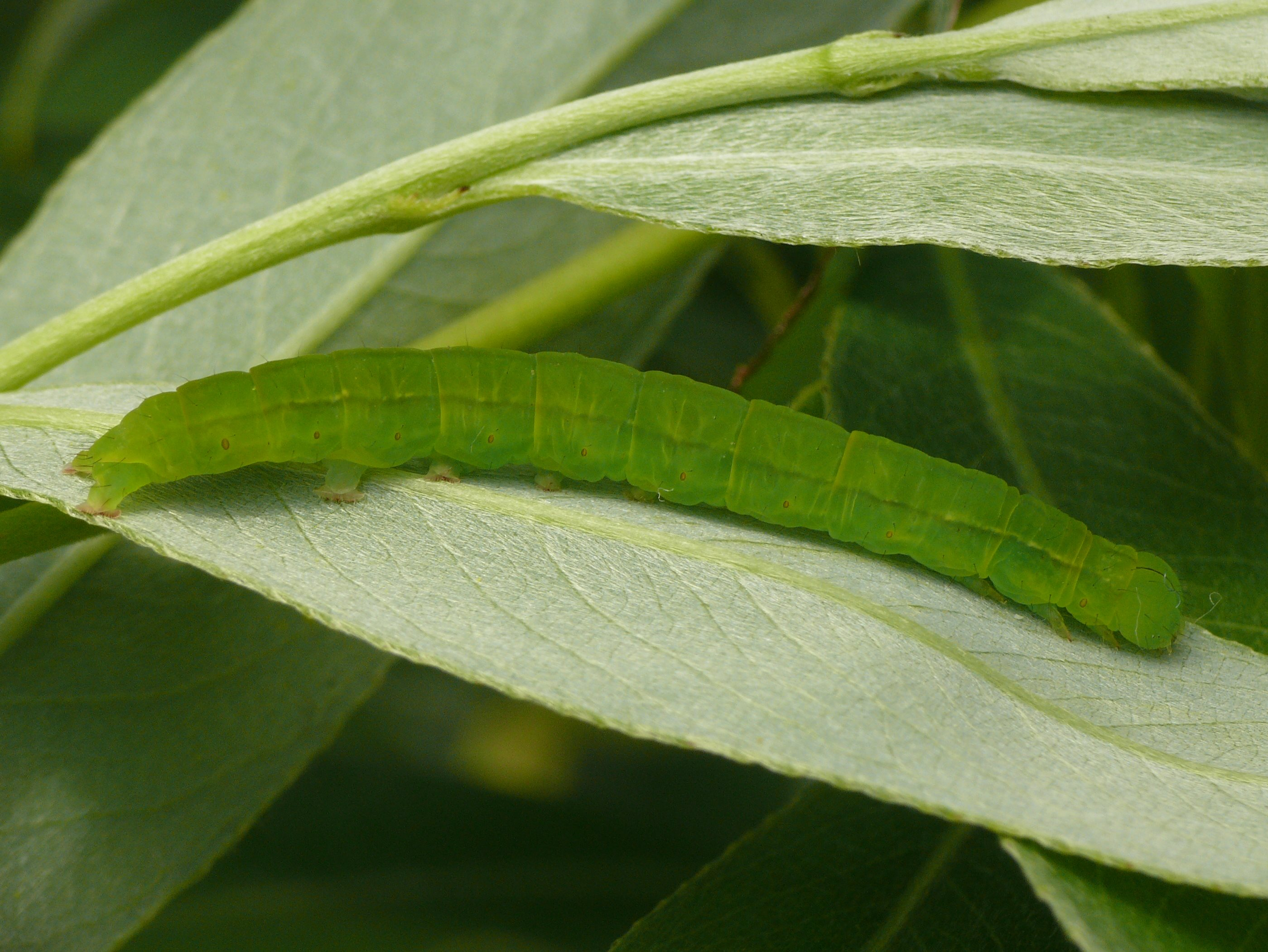
Larva on white willow

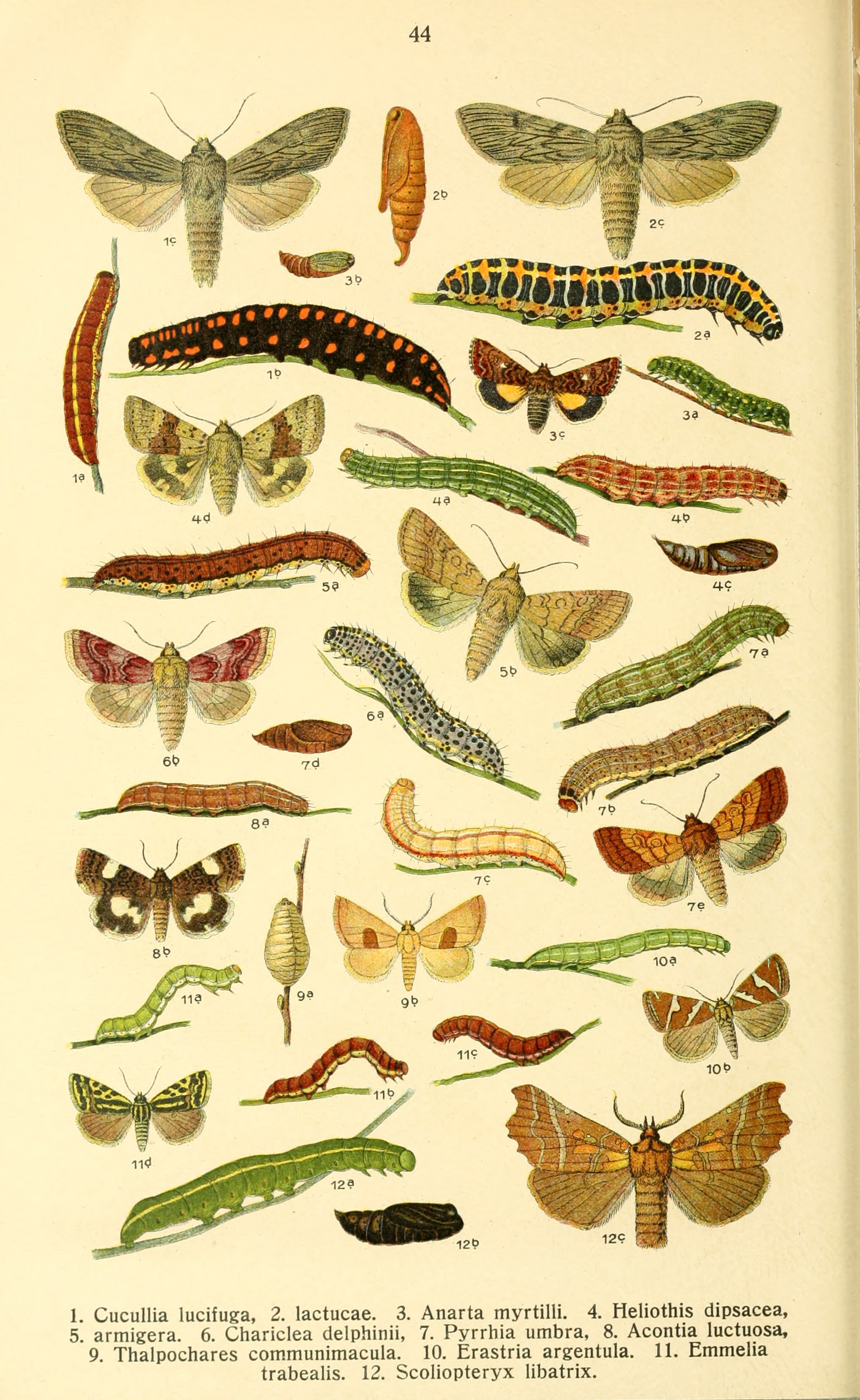
Larva, pupa and moth in Karl Eckstein's Die Schmetterlinge Deutschlands (figures 12a, b and c)

== Biology ==
The herald's flight period is between June and November, in one or two broods. During the winter the herald moth hibernates in dark, cool structures (e.g. cellars, barns and caves), returning to take wing again from March to June. Its habitat is woodland parks and gardens, and (perhaps consequently) the resting wing pattern resembles a dead, shrivelled leaf.

Herald caterpillars are a bright green shade common to many caterpillars. They are distinguished by the thin yellow lines running across the body between segments. When maturity is reached, they pupate between two leaves, in a white cocoon made of silk. They are often found on Willow, Aspen, and Poplar.

Herald moths are the first recorded insect to use the piloerection mechanism for thermoregulation. Piloerection helps the moth to save energy by decreasing heat loss and shortening the duration of the warm-up, while "laying the hairs down" may provide fast decreasing of the body temperature and reduction of energy expenditure. During flight, the piloerection affects both heat insulation and heat production, especially important during higher flight speeds that require greater "fur" insulation.

== Food plants ==
Larval food plants include:

- Willow
- Aspen
- Poplar

As adults:

- Ivy blossom
- Ripe blackberries
- Ripe raspberries
