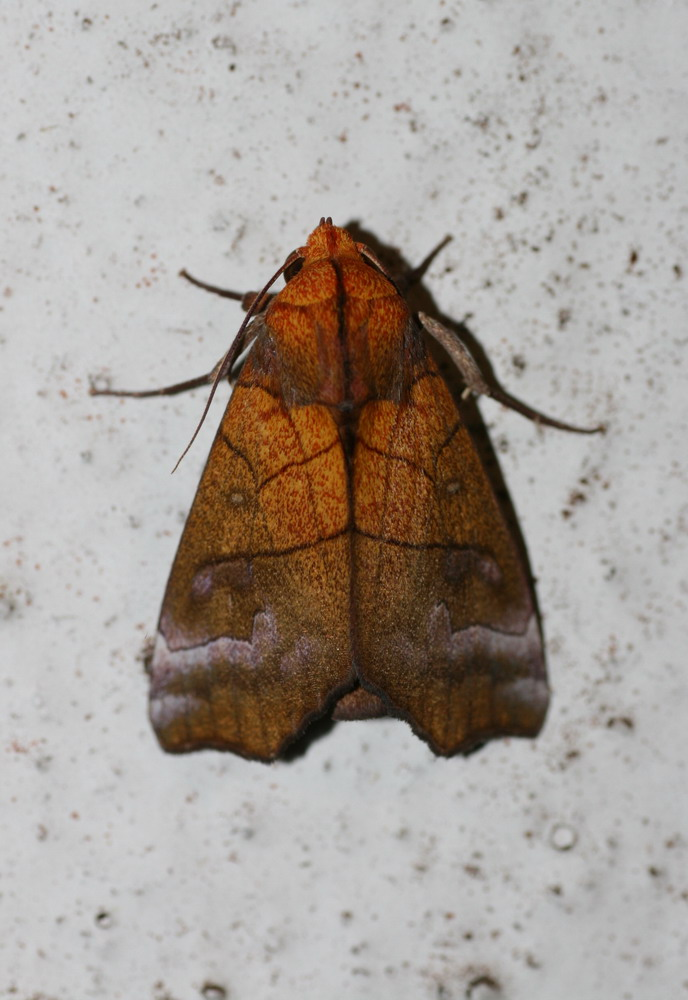

Scientific classification
- Kingdom: Animalia
- Phylum: Arthropoda
- Class: Insecta
- Order: Lepidoptera
- Superfamily: Noctuoidea
- Family: Erebidae
- Genus: Anomis
- Species: A. scitipennis

Binomial name
- Anomis scitipennis Walker, 1864

Synonyms
- Cosmophila scitipennis Walker, [1863]; Cosmophila ochreifusa Swinhoe, 1906; Cosmophila milva Swinhoe, 1919

= Anomis scitipennis =

Species of moth

Anomis scitipennis is a noctuid moth of the family Erebidae. It is found in Peninsular Malaysia, Sumatra, Borneo, Thailand, Sulawesi and New Guinea. The species mostly inhabits lowland forest.
