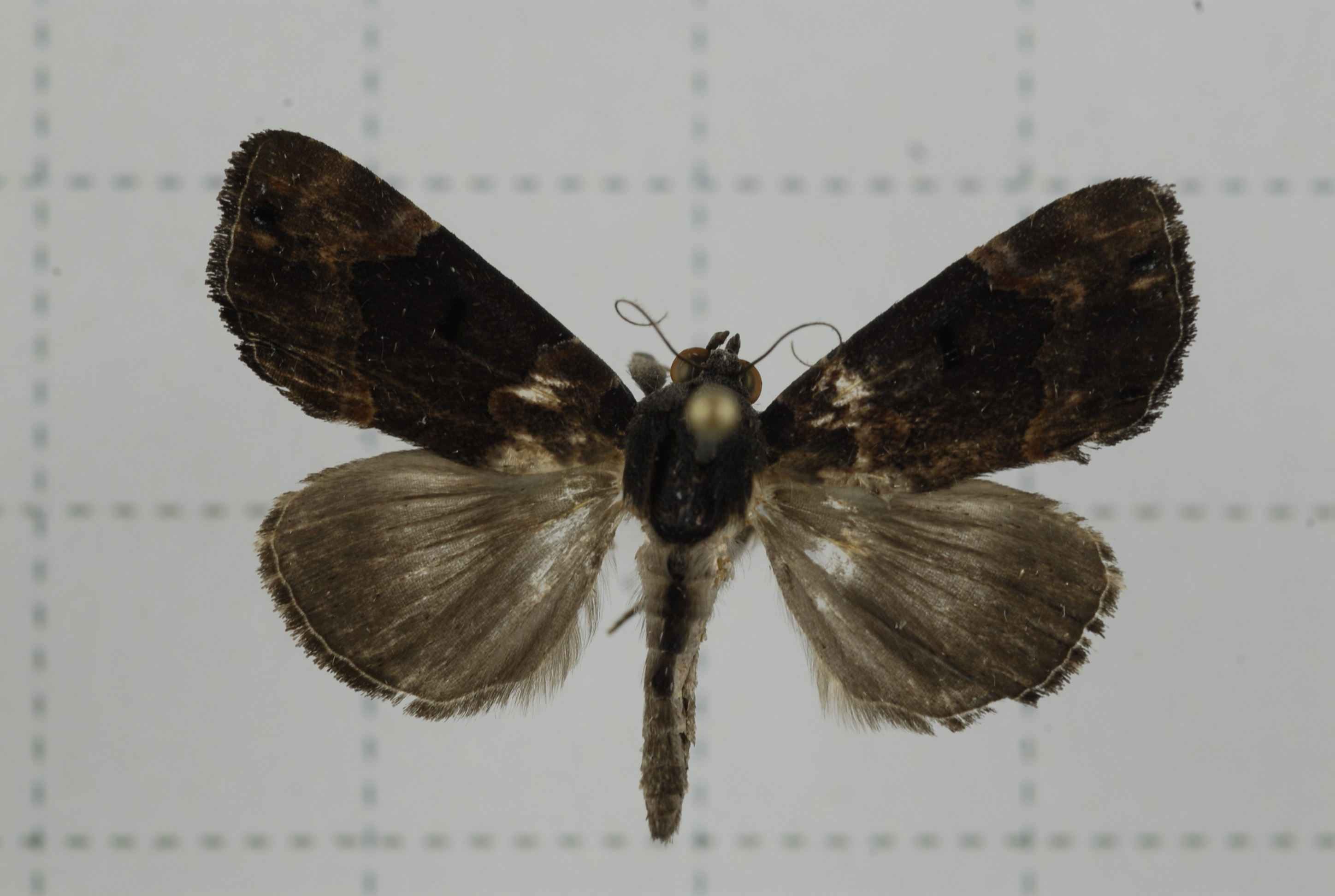

Scientific classification
- Kingdom: Animalia
- Phylum: Arthropoda
- Class: Insecta
- Order: Lepidoptera
- Superfamily: Noctuoidea
- Family: Erebidae
- Genus: Dinumma
- Species: D. placens

Binomial name
- Dinumma placens Walker, 1858

= Dinumma placens =

Species of moth

Dinumma placens is a moth of the family Erebidae first described by Francis Walker in 1858. It is found in the Indian sub-region, Sri Lanka, Thailand, China, Taiwan and Japan.

Forewings darker with some indigo shine. Postmedial is more distant. Zigzag antemedial and postmedial fasciae. A conspicuous dark discal mark found in the medial area between fasciae. Caterpillars are known to feed on Pithecollobium lucidum.

== Images ==
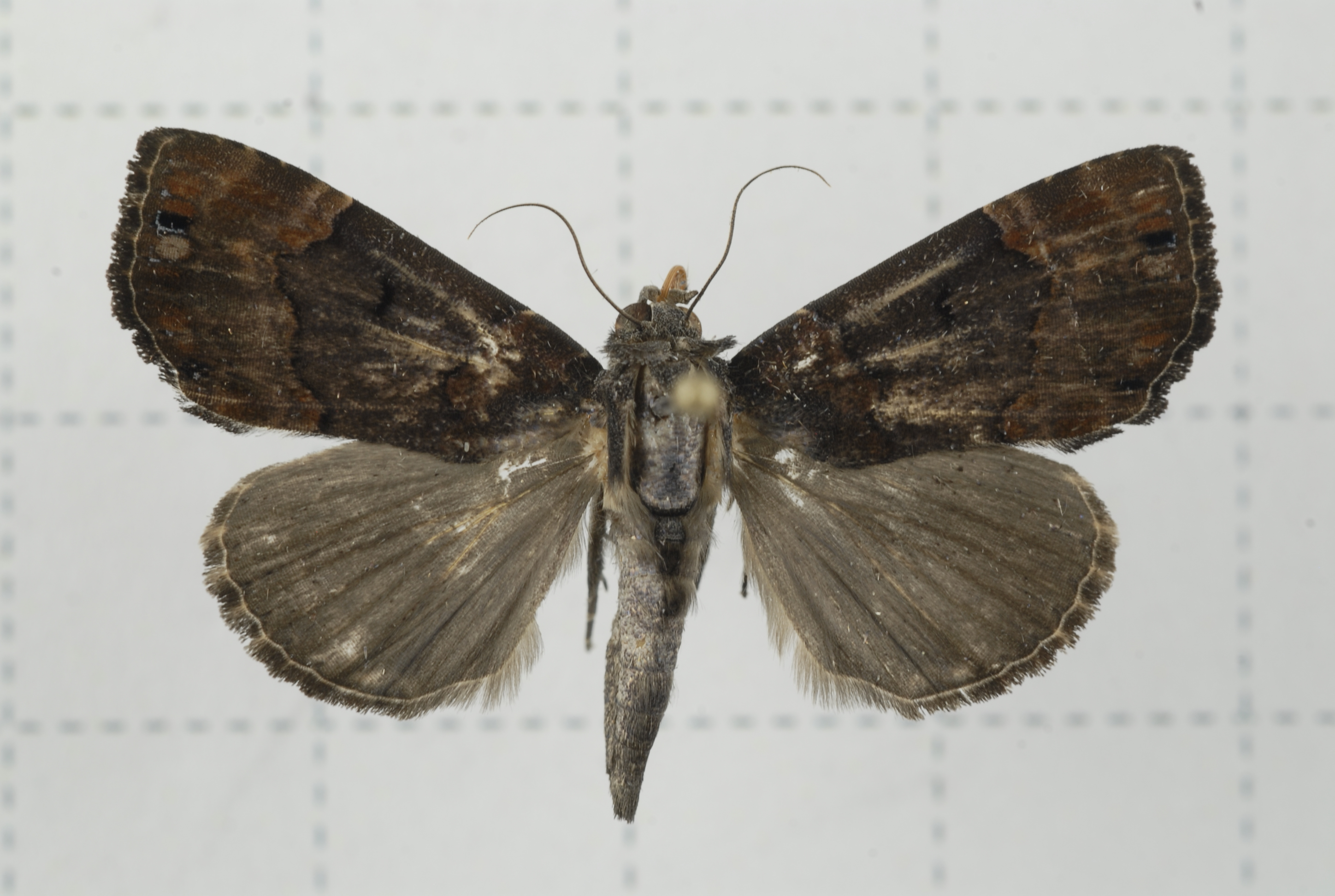

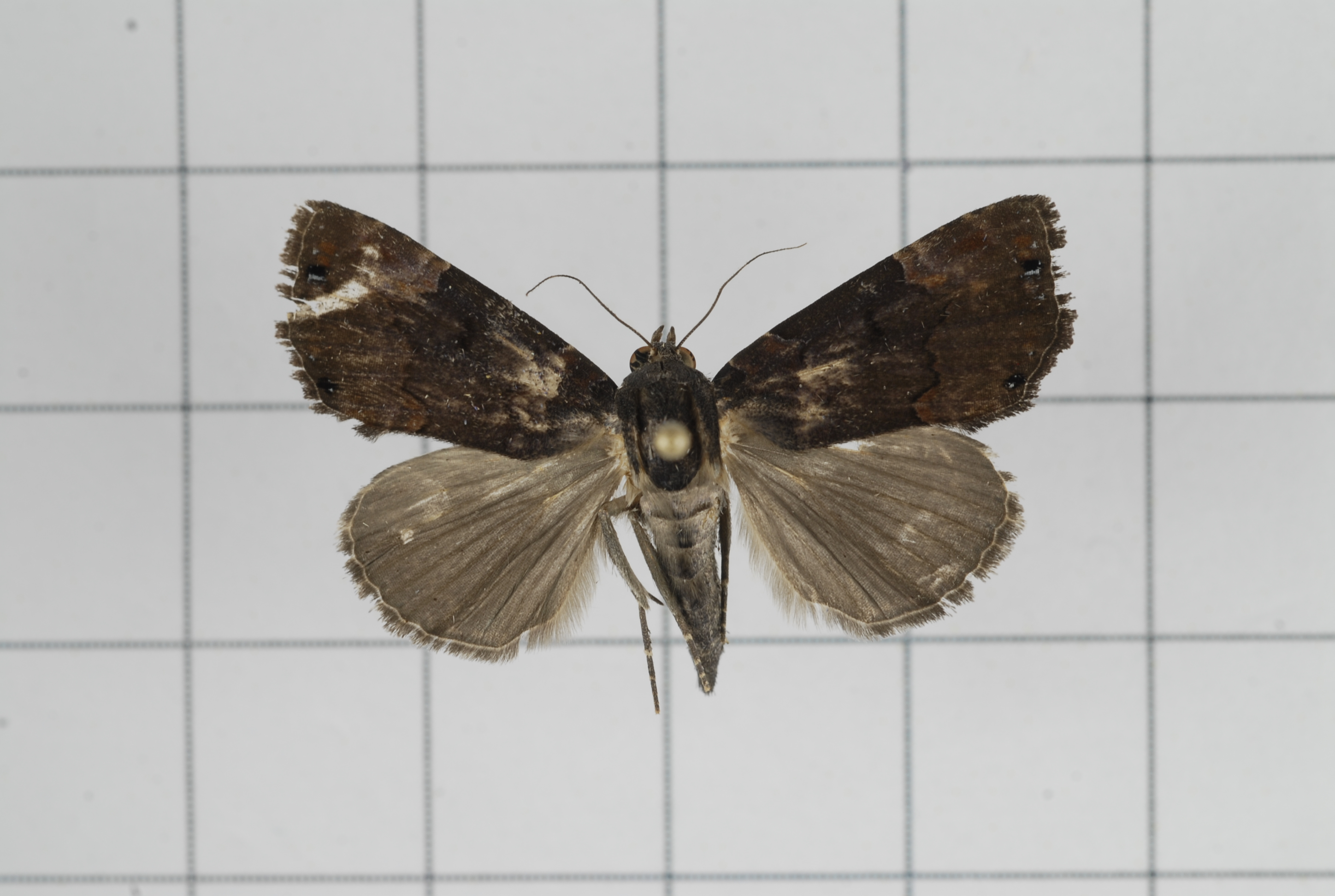

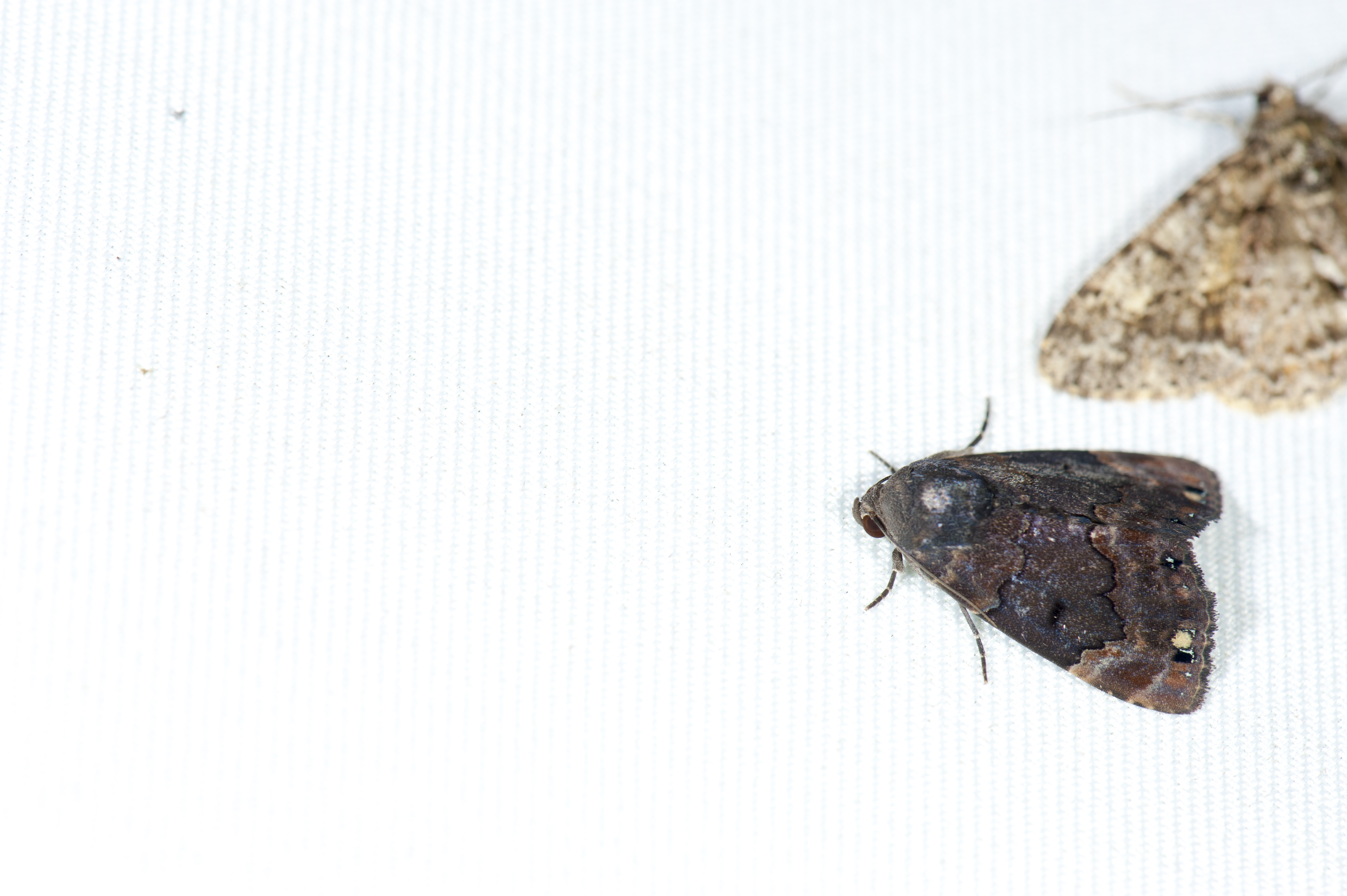
