= Anomis editrix =

Scientific classification
- Kingdom: Animalia
- Phylum: Arthropoda
- Class: Insecta
- Order: Lepidoptera
- Superfamily: Noctuoidea
- Family: Erebidae
- Genus: Anomis
- Species: A. editrix

Binomial name
- Anomis editrix (Guenée, 1852)

Species of moth

Anomis editrix, the Gulf scalloped moth, is an owlet moth in the family Erebidae. The species was first described by Achille Guenée in 1852. It is found in North and Central America.

The MONA or Hodges number for Anomis editrix is 8553.
