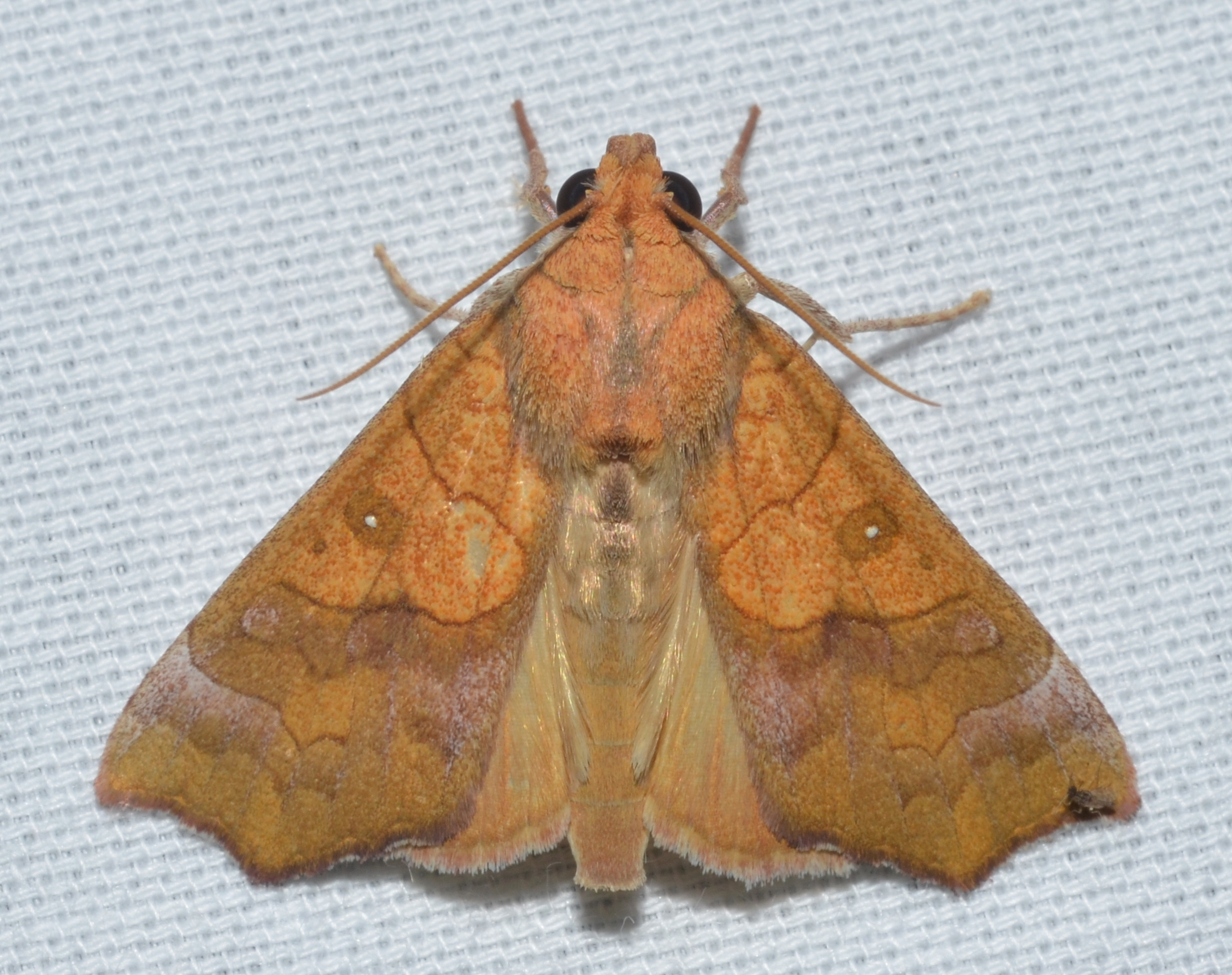

Scientific classification
- Kingdom: Animalia
- Phylum: Arthropoda
- Clade: Pancrustacea
- Class: Insecta
- Order: Lepidoptera
- Superfamily: Noctuoidea
- Family: Erebidae
- Subfamily: Scoliopteryginae
- Tribe: Anomini
- Genus: Anomis; Hübner, [1821]

Synonyms
- Amarna Walker, 1857; Anomus Agassiz, 1847; Capitaria Walker, 1869; Cosmophila Boisduval, 1833; Deinopalpus Holland, 1894; Deremma Walker, 1865; Gonepteronia Kenrick, 1917; Gonitis Guenée, 1852; Gonopteronia Bethune-Baker, 1906; Molopa C. Swinhoe, 1902; Ristra Walker, 1858; Rusicada Walker, 1858; Scoedisa Walker, 1858; Tiridata Walker, 1865

= Anomis =

Genus of moths

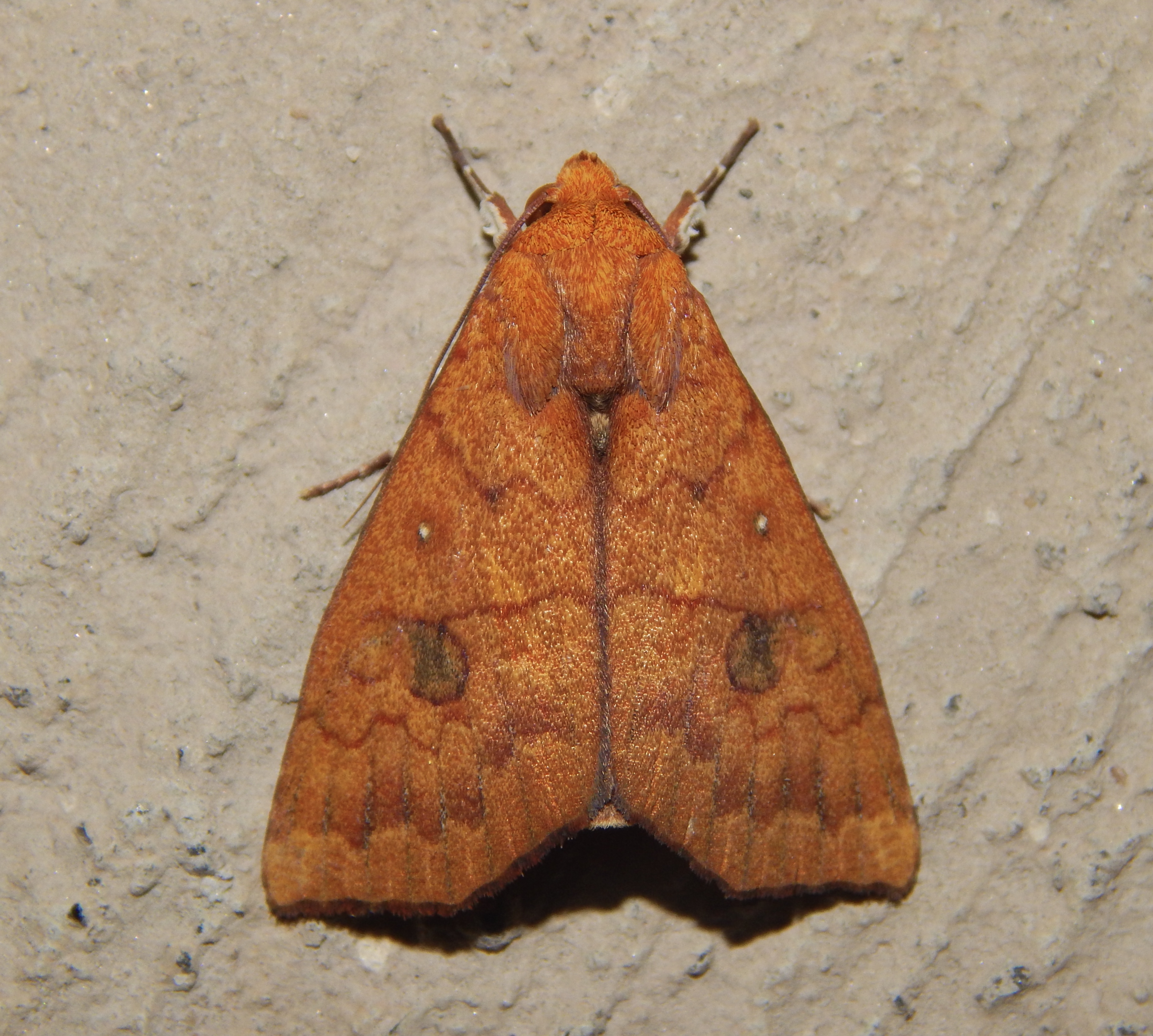
Anomis fulvida from India

Anomis is a genus of moths in the family Erebidae.

== Description ==
Palpi upturned, where the second joint reaching vertex of head and third joint long and slender. Front tuft is blunt. Antennae minutely ciliated in male or pectinated. Thorax and abdomen smoothly scaled. Tibia spineless. Forewings with produced and acute apex. Outer margin angled or produced to a point in the middle. Hindwings with vein 5 from below center of discocellulars. Larva with non-swollen thoracic somites.

== Species ==
- Anomis albipunctillum Dognin 1912
- Anomis albipunctula Hampson 1926
- Anomis albitarsata (Pagenstecher 1888)
- Anomis albitibia (Walker 1858)
- Anomis albopunctata (Bethune-Baker 1906)
- Anomis alluaudi Viette 1965
- Anomis angulata (Bethune-Baker 1906)
- Anomis apta (Walker 1869)
- Anomis argentipuncta Kobes 1982
- Anomis aricina Druce 1889
- Anomis aroa (Bethune-Baker 1906)
- Anomis badia Hampson 1926
- Anomis barata Schaus 1911
- Anomis benitensis (Holland 1894)
- Anomis bicolor Prout 1922
- Anomis bidentata (Hampson 1910)
- Anomis bipunctata (Kenrick 1917)
- Anomis brunnea (Swinhoe 1890)
- Anomis calamodes Hampson 1926
- Anomis campanalis (Mabille 1880)
- Anomis capensis (Gaede 1940)
- Anomis cataggelus Dyar 1913
- Anomis catarhodois Dyar 1913
- Anomis combinans (Walker 1858)
- Anomis crassicornis Dyar 1913
- Anomis cupienda (Swinhoe 1903)
- Anomis curvifera (Walker 1858)
- Anomis dealbata Prout 1926
- Anomis definata Lucas 1894
- Anomis directilinea Schaus 1911
- Anomis discursa (Walker 1857)
- Anomis editrix (Guenée 1852)
- Anomis ekeikei (Bethune-Baker 1906)
- Anomis elegans Berio 1956
- Anomis endochlora Hampson 1926
- Anomis erosa Hübner 1821 – yellow scallop moth
- Anomis erosoides (Giacomelli 1915)
- Anomis esocampta Hampson 1926
- Anomis eucystica Dyar 1913
- Anomis eueres Prout 1928
- Anomis exacta Hübner 1822
- Anomis exaggerata Guenée 1852
- Anomis extima (Walker 1858)
- Anomis fatme (Stoll 1790)
- Anomis figlina Butler 1889
- Anomis flammea Schaus 1894
- Anomis flava (Fabricius 1775) – tropical anomis moth
- Anomis fornax Guenée 1852
- Anomis fuliginosa Candeze 1927
- Anomis fulminans (Bethune-Baker 1906)
- Anomis fulvida Guenée 1852
- Anomis gentilis Schaus 1912
- Anomis gossypii (Sepp 1848)
- Anomis grisea (Pagenstecher 1907)
- Anomis gundlachi Schaus 1940
- Anomis gymnopus Dyar 1913
- Anomis hawaiiensis (Butler 1882)
- Anomis hedys (Dyar 1913)
- Anomis hemiscopis Dyar 1913
- Anomis holortha Hampson 1926
- Anomis ignobilis (Walker 1869)
- Anomis illita Guenée 1852 (syn: Anomis conducta Walker, [1858], Anomis hostia (Harvey, 1876)) – okra leafworm moth
- Anomis impasta Guenée 1852
- Anomis innocua Schaus 1911
- Anomis involuta (Walker 1858)
- Anomis iobapta Prout 1927
- Anomis irene Prout 1929
- Anomis kebeensis (Bethune-Baker 1906)
- Anomis lavaudeni Viette 1968
- Anomis leona (Schaus 1893)
- Anomis leucosema Hampson 1926
- Anomis lineosa (Walker 1865)
- Anomis longipennis Sugi 1982
- Anomis lophognatha Hampson 1926
- Anomis luperca Moschler 1883
- Anomis luridula Guenée 1852
- Anomis lyona (Swinhoe 1919)
- Anomis macronephra Holloway 1982
- Anomis madida Viette 1958
- Anomis mafalui (Bethune-Baker 1906)
- Anomis mandraka Viette 1965
- Anomis maxima Berio 1956
- Anomis melanosema Berio 1956
- Anomis mesogona (Walker 1858)
- Anomis metaxantha (Walker 1858)
- Anomis microdonta Hampson 1926
- Anomis modesta Berio 1956
- Anomis mutilata Walker 1859
- Anomis nigritarsis (Walker 1858)
- Anomis noctivolans (Butler 1880)
- Anomis obusta Dognin 1912
- Anomis oedema Guenée 1852
- Anomis orthopasa Dyar 1913
- Anomis patagiata Schaus 1911
- Anomis phanerosema Hampson 1926
- Anomis picta (Sepp 1848)
- Anomis planalis (Swinhoe 1902)
- Anomis poliopasta Hampson 1926
- Anomis polymorpha Hampson 1926
- Anomis prapata Kobes 1982
- Anomis prima Swinhoe 1920
- Anomis privata (Walker 1865) – hibiscus-leaf caterpillar moth
- Anomis properans (Walker 1858)
- Anomis psamathodes (Turner, 1902)
- Anomis punctulata (Holland 1894)
- Anomis pyrocausta Hampson 1926
- Anomis pyrotherma Hampson 1926
- Anomis regalissima Dyar 1913
- Anomis rubida Schaus 1911
- Anomis rufescens (Pagenstecher 1884)
- Anomis rufescensoides Poole 1989
- Anomis sabulifera (Guenée 1852) – angled gem moth
- Anomis samoana (Butler 1886)
- Anomis schistosema Hampson 1926
- Anomis scitipennis (Walker 1863)
- Anomis semipallida Prout 1926
- Anomis simulatrix (Walker 1865)
- Anomis sinensis Berio 1977
- Anomis sophistes Dyar 1913
- Anomis stermochla Turner 1936
- Anomis stigmocraspis Dyar 1913
- Anomis subfuscata Berio 1956
- Anomis sublineata (Walker 1869)
- Anomis subpurpurea (Bethune-Baker 1906)
- Anomis subrosealis (Walker 1866)
- Anomis subtusnigra Berio 1977
- Anomis sumatrana Swinhoe 1920
- Anomis tamsi Berio 1940
- Anomis texana Riley 1885
- Anomis tingescens Dyar 1913
- Anomis trichomosia Hampson 1926
- Anomis trilineata (Moore 1883)
- Anomis vulpicolor (Meyrick 1928)
- Anomis vulpina (Butler 1886)
- Anomis xanthomicta Hampson 1926
