= Scoliopterygini =

Scientific classification
- Domain: Eukaryota
- Kingdom: Animalia
- Phylum: Arthropoda
- Class: Insecta
- Order: Lepidoptera
- Superfamily: Noctuoidea
- Family: Erebidae
- Subfamily: Scoliopteryginae
- Tribe: Scoliopterygini; Herrich-Schäffer, [1852]

Tribe of moths

The Scoliopterygini are a tribe of moths in the family Erebidae.

== Genera ==
- Ossonoba
- Scoliopteryx
