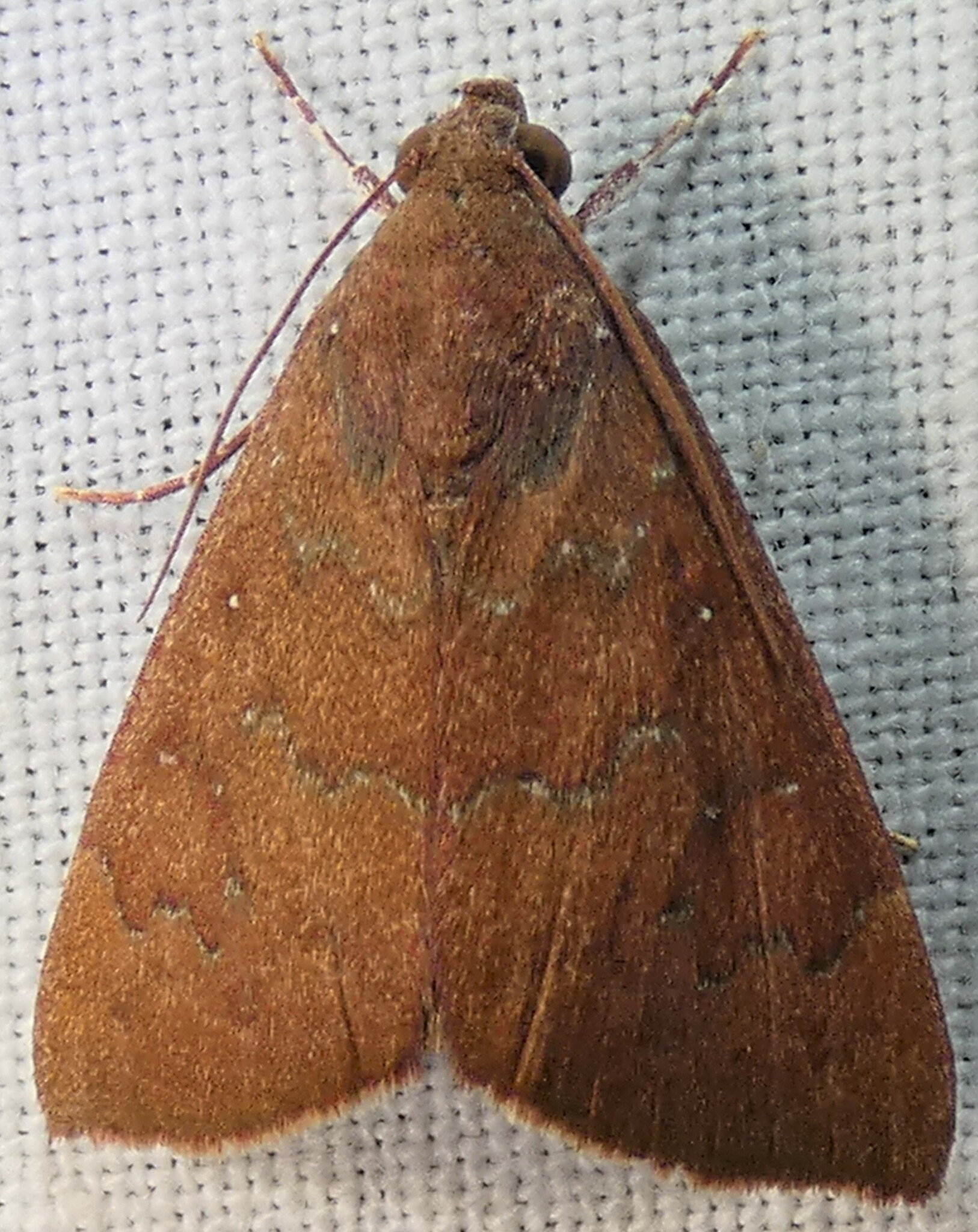

Scientific classification
- Kingdom: Animalia
- Phylum: Arthropoda
- Class: Insecta
- Order: Lepidoptera
- Superfamily: Noctuoidea
- Family: Erebidae
- Genus: Anomis
- Species: A. illita

Binomial name
- Anomis illita Guenée, 1852

Synonyms
- Aletia hostia Harvey, 1876; Anomis conducta Walker, 1858

= Anomis illita =

Species of moth

Anomis illita, known generally as the okra leafworm or illita anomis moth, is a moth species in the family Erebidae. It is found in North America.

The MONA or Hodges number for Anomis illita is 8551.
