= Anomis combinans =

Scientific classification
- Kingdom: Animalia
- Phylum: Arthropoda
- Class: Insecta
- Order: Lepidoptera
- Superfamily: Noctuoidea
- Family: Erebidae
- Genus: Anomis
- Species: A. combinans

Binomial name
- Anomis combinans (Walker, [1858])

Synonyms
- Rusicada revocans Walker, [1858]; Gonitis combinans Walker, [1858]; Gonitis revocans Walker, 1858; Anomis busana C. Swinhoe, 1920

Species of moth

Anomis combinans, the yellow-banded semi-looper moth, is a moth of the family Erebidae. The species was first described by Francis Walker in 1858. It is found in Australia, Sri Lanka, Borneo, New Guinea, Malaysia and Timor.

== Description ==
Its wingspan is about 4 cm. Forewings are dark orange. A faint brown line and a dark mark are found in the middle of each forewing. Costa slightly curved and resemble a hooked tip. Margin doubly recurved. Full-grown caterpillar is about 4 cm long. It is greyish with yellow spots in rows along each side which is edged with black. A white dorsal line also edged in black. Pupation occur in a curled leaf. Caterpillars are known to feed on Hibiscus tiliaceus, Hibiscus heterophyllus and Waltheria americana species.
