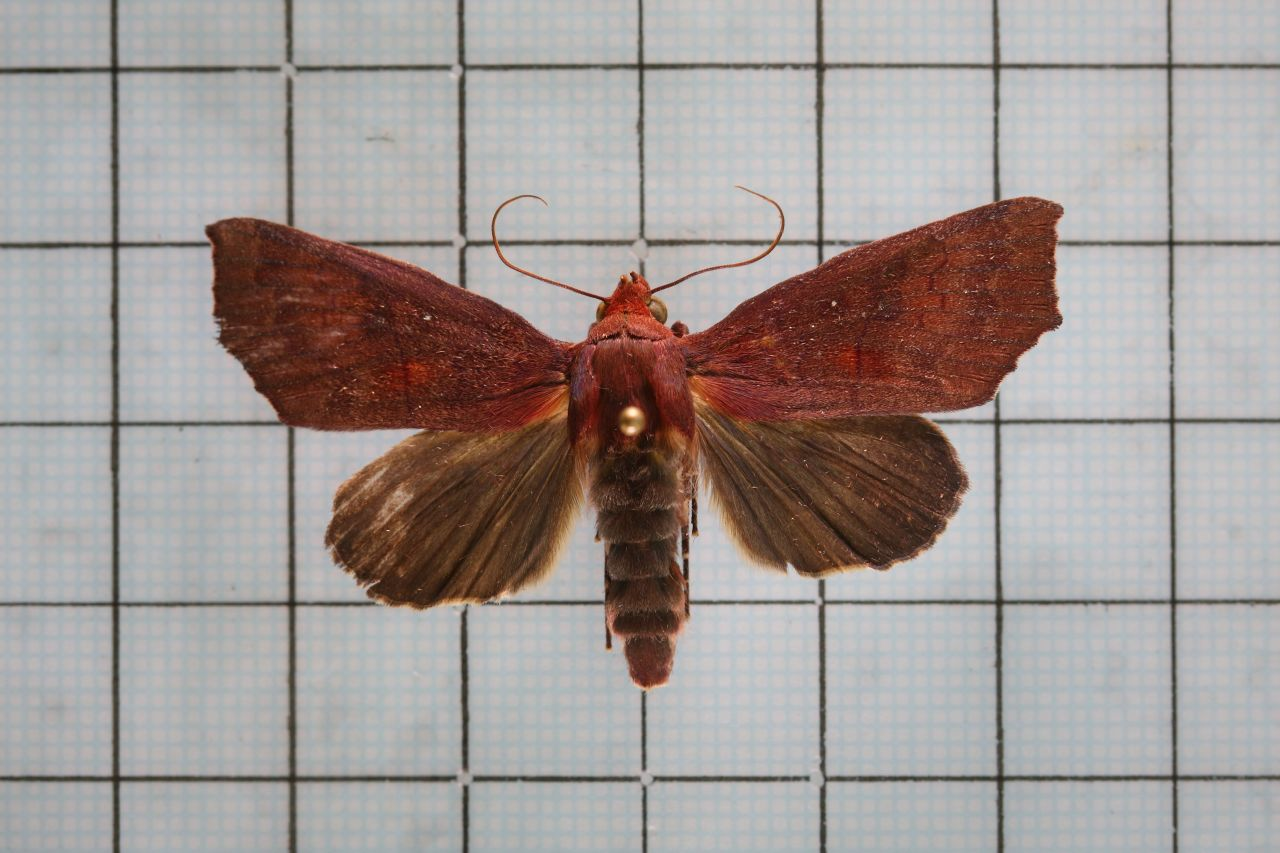

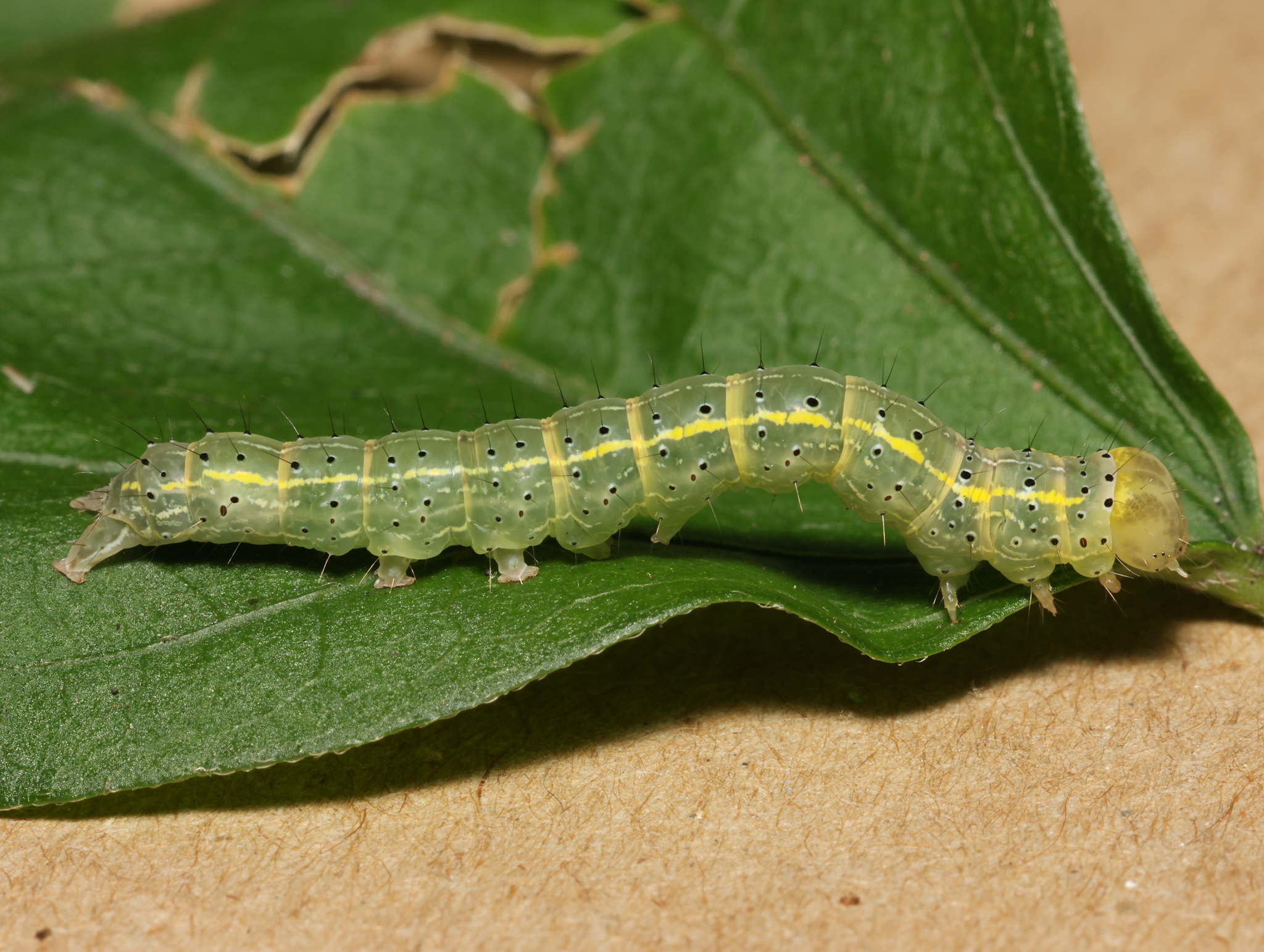
- Larva on Hibiscus syriacus

Scientific classification
- Kingdom: Animalia
- Phylum: Arthropoda
- Class: Insecta
- Order: Lepidoptera
- Superfamily: Noctuoidea
- Family: Erebidae
- Genus: Anomis
- Species: A. privata

Binomial name
- Anomis privata (Walker, 1865)

Synonyms
- Anomis commoda (Butler, 1878); Rusicada privata (Lafontaine and Schmidt, 2015)

= Anomis privata =

Species of moth

Anomis privata, the hibiscus-leaf caterpillar moth, is a moth of the family Erebidae. The species was first described by Francis Walker in 1865. It is found in China, Taiwan and Japan, but has also been recorded from North America, as most verified sightings have been in the northeastern United States. It has been introduced to eastern North America from Japan.
