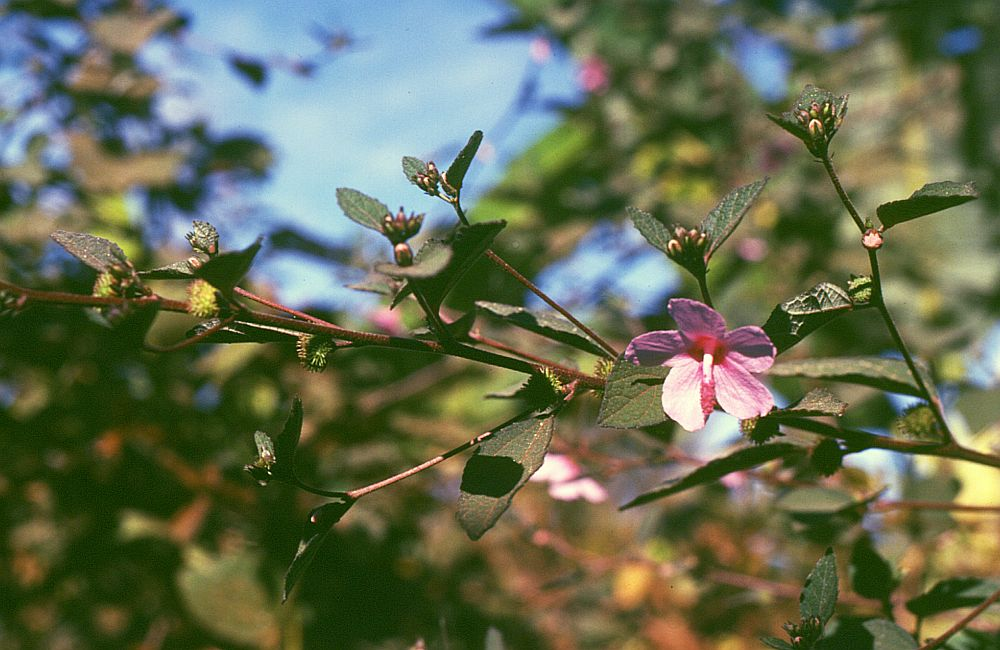
- Urena lobata

Scientific classification
- Kingdom: Plantae
- Clade: Embryophytes
- Clade: Tracheophytes
- Clade: Spermatophytes
- Clade: Angiosperms
- Clade: Eudicots
- Clade: Rosids
- Order: Malvales
- Family: Malvaceae
- Subfamily: Malvoideae
- Tribe: Hibisceae
- Genus: Urena; L.

= Urena =

Genus of flowering plants

Urena is a genus of plants which grow in various tropical and subtropical areas worldwide. Some view Urena lobata as a weed, but others make use of its fibre for various purposes. The leaves and flowers are also a famine food in Africa. Its seeds are spread by animals. Fibres obtained from it are used for making coffee sacks in Brazil.

== Species ==
Plants of the World Online currently includes:

1. Urena armitiana F.Muell.
2. Urena australiensis Fryxell & Craven
3. Urena lobata L. - type species
4. Urena pedersenii Krapov.
5. Urena procumbens L.
6. Urena repanda Roxb. ex Sm.
7. Urena rigida Wall. ex Mast.

== Gallery ==
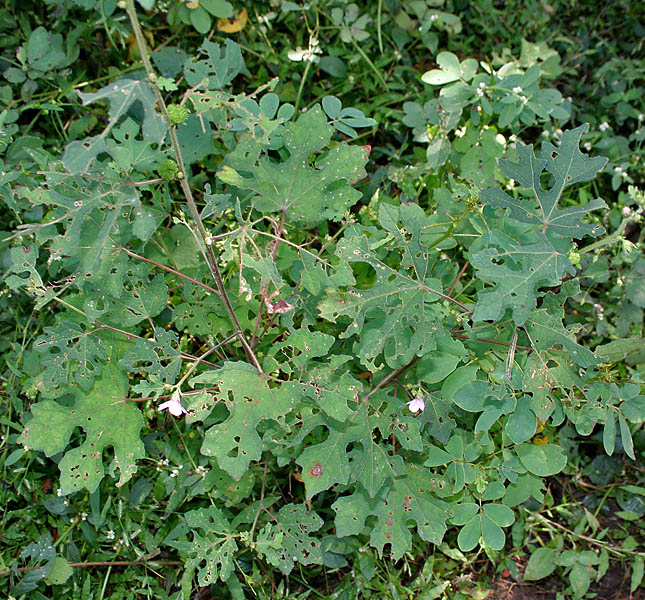
Urena lobata var. sinuata in Narsapur, Medak district, India.

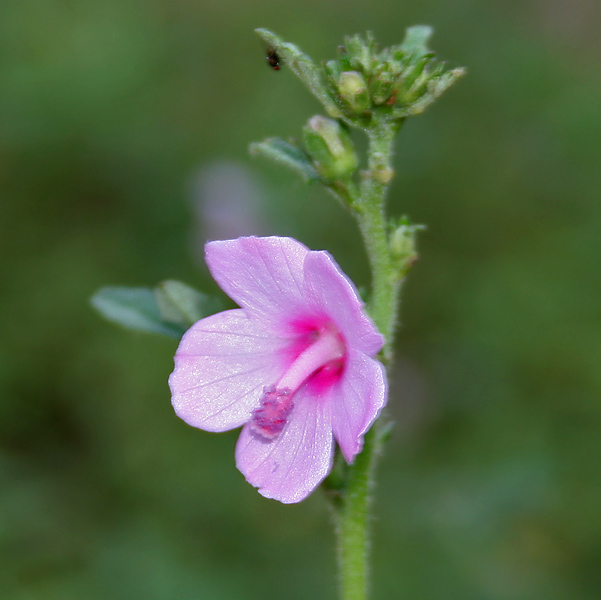
Urena lobata var. sinuata in Narsapur, Medak district, India.

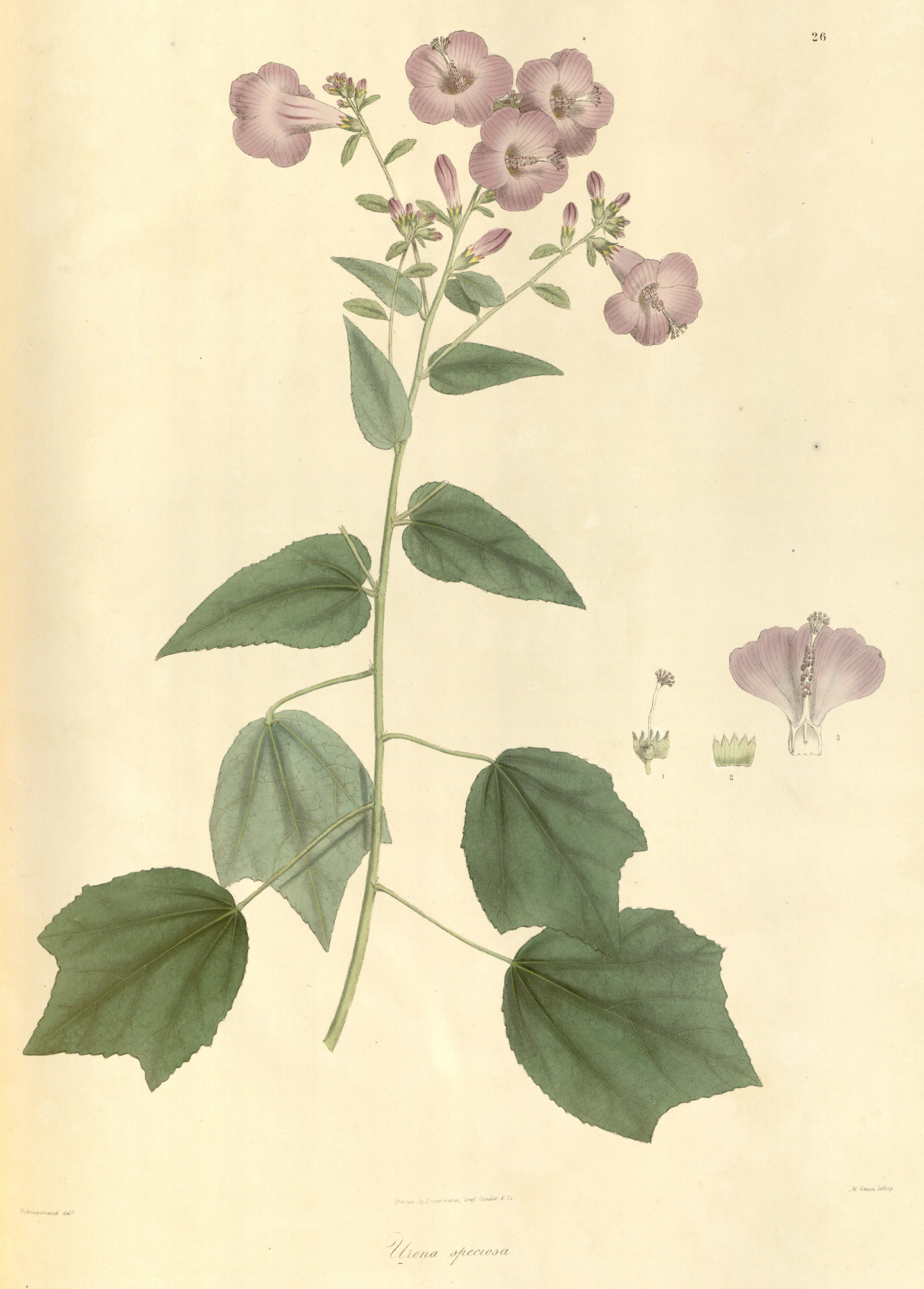
"Urena repanda"

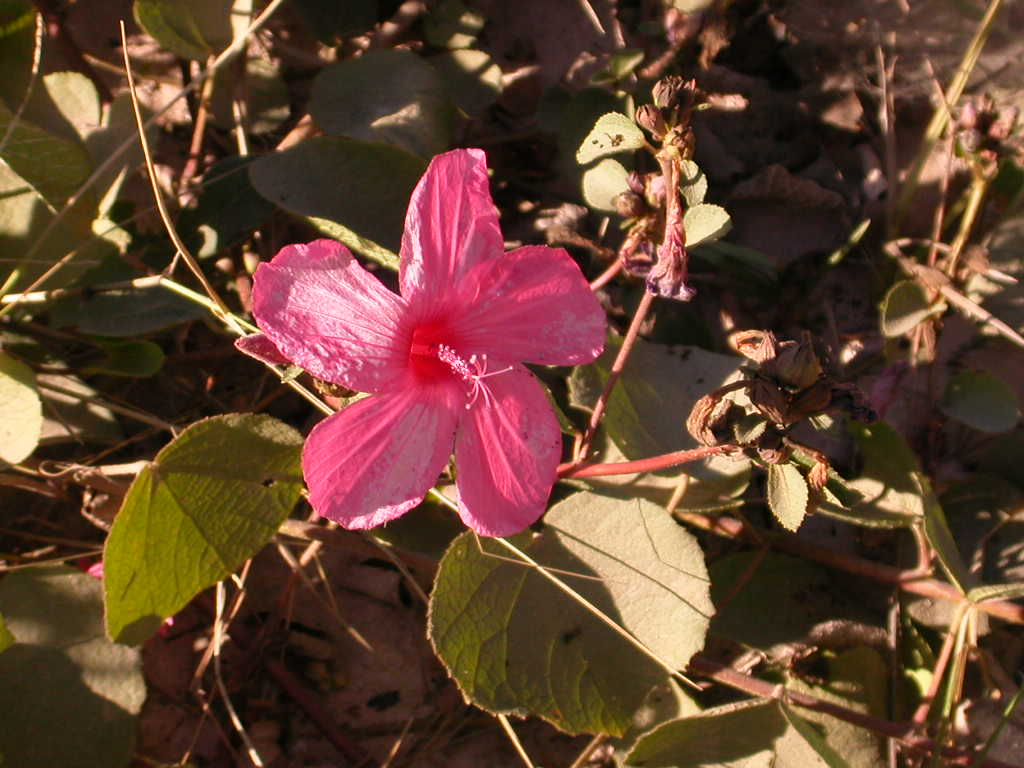
Urena rigida
