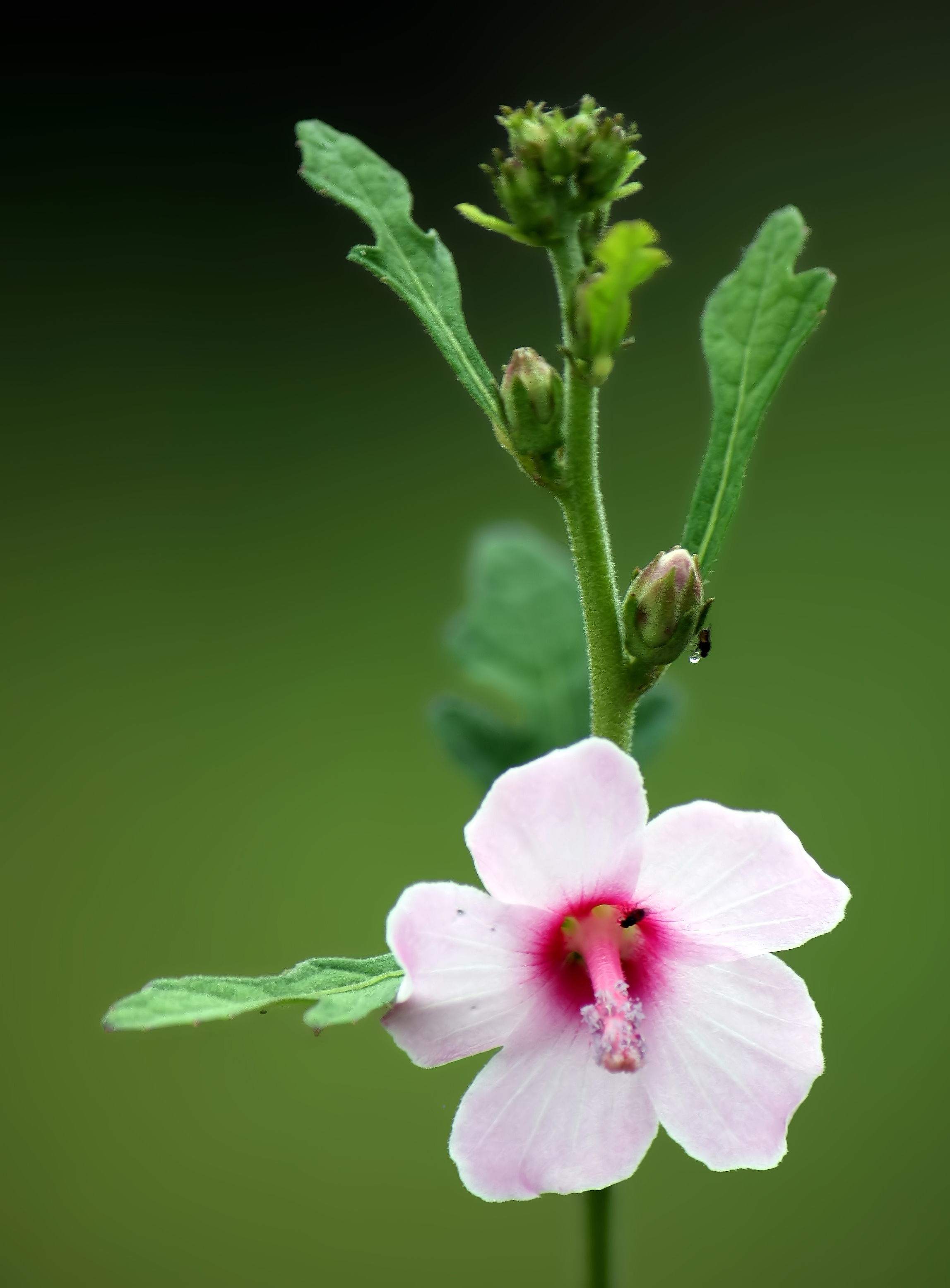

Conservation status
- Least Concern (IUCN 3.1)

Scientific classification
- Kingdom: Plantae
- Clade: Tracheophytes
- Clade: Angiosperms
- Clade: Eudicots
- Clade: Rosids
- Order: Malvales
- Family: Malvaceae
- Genus: Urena
- Species: U. lobata

Binomial name
- Urena lobata L.

Varieties
- Urena lobata var. glauca (Blume) Borss.Waalk.; Urena lobata var. henryi S.Y.Hu; Urena lobata subsp. lobata; Urena lobata var. mauritiana Marais; Urena lobata var. multifida (Cav.) Hochr.; Urena lobata subsp. sinuata (L.) Borss.Waalk.; Urena lobata var. tricuspis (Cav.) Gürke; Urena lobata var. umbonata Marais; Urena lobata var. yunnanensis S.Y.Hu

Synonyms
- List: Hibiscus americanus (L.) Mabb.; Malachra urena DC.; Urena aculeata Mill.; Urena americana L.; Urena blumei Hassk.; Urena callifera C.B.Clarke; Urena cana Wall.; Urena chinensis Osbeck; Urena diversifolia Schumach. & Thonn.; Urena grandiflora DC.; Urena haenkeana Walp.; Urena heteromorpha Montrouz.; Urena heterophylla C.Presl; Urena heterophylla Schrad.; Urena heterophylla Sm.; Urena lappago Sm.; Urena lappago var. glauca Blume; Urena lobata f. swartzii Hochr.; Urena lobata f. umbrosa Hochr.; Urena lobata subsp. alba S.N.Pardeshi & Srinivasu; Urena lobata var. americana (L.) Gürke; Urena lobata var. chinensis (Osbeck) S.Y.Hu; Urena lobata var. genuina Miq.; Urena lobata var. lappago (Sm.) M.R.Almeida; Urena lobata var. nummularia Hochr.; Urena lobata var. reticulata (Cav.) Gürke; Urena lobata var. rhombifolia A.Gray; Urena lobata var. scabriuscula (DC.) Walp.; Urena lobata var. sinuata (L.) Miq.; Urena lobata var. tomentosa (Blume) Walp.; Urena lobata var. trilobata (Vell.) Gürke; Urena lobata var. viminea (Cav.) Gürke; Urena loureiroi Meisn. ex Steud.; Urena manihot Klotzsch; Urena mauritiana Sieber ex Colla; Urena microcarpa DC.; Urena monopetala Lour.; Urena morifolia DC.; Urena multifida Cav.; Urena muricata DC.; Urena obtusata Guill. & Perr.; Urena paradoxa Kunth; Urena phyllomorpha Steud.; Urena repanda Blume; Urena reticulata Cav.; Urena ribesia Sm.; Urena scabriuscula DC.; Urena sieberi Colla; Urena sinuata L.; Urena sinuata Sw.; Urena sinuata var. ceylanica Gürke; Urena swartzii DC.; Urena tomentosa Blume; Urena tomentosa Wall.; Urena trichocarpa Gagnep.; Urena tricuspis Cav.; Urena trilobata Vell.; Urena viminea Cav.; Urena virgata Guill. & Perr.

= Urena lobata =

Species of plant from Brazil and some islands of South America

Urena lobata, commonly known as Caesarweed or Congo jute, is a tender perennial, variable, erect, ascendant shrub or subshrub measuring up to 0.5 meters (1.6 ft) to 2.5 meters (8.2 ft) tall. The stems are covered with minute, star-like hairs and often tinged purple. Considered a weed, it is considered to be native throughout much of the tropical and subtropical world, including South and Central America, Africa, Asia and Pacific Islands.

== Description ==
Urena lobata in flower

=== Vegetative characteristics ===
Urena lobata is an up to 2 m tall, single-stemmed, erect, annual subshrub with free-branching, bushy stems bearing stellate hairs. The simple, alternate leaves have a lanceolate or ovate to broadly ovate, slightly 3-lobed to unlobed, 1.5–9.5 cm long, and 1–10 cm wide lamina with a serrate margin. The caducous, filiform stipules are 2 mm long. The petiole is 1–9 cm long.

=== Generative characteristics ===
The small, showy, solitary, axillary, deep pink flower is darker at the base. The 5–7 mm long epicalyx is partially fused. The campanulate, 5–8 mm long, 5-lobed, basally fused calyx with a ciliate margin is adaxially glabrous and abaxially pubescent. The obovate petals are 1–1.5 cm long. The staminal column is 1–1.5 cm long. The subglobose, 4 mm wide ovary is densely pubescent. The 10–branched style with 1 mm long branches has discoid, ciliate stigmas. The 8–12 mm wide, depressed-globose schizocarp is composed of 5 trigonous mericarps with densely stellate hairs and glochidiate spines. The hooked bristles are 2 mm long. The fruits may stick to clothing or fur. The reniform, brown, 3.5–4 mm long, finely striate seeds are minutely hairy to glabrous.

=== Cytology ===
The chromosome count is 2n = 28, 56.

== Taxonomy ==
It was described by Carl Linnaeus in 1753. The specific epithet lobata means lobed.

== Distribution and habitat ==
It is native to the tropics and subtropics, where it grows on riverbeds, in bushes, fallow areas, and in disturbed grounds with low ruderal and shrubby secondary vegetation.

== Invasiveness ==
The plant can invade areas of ecological disturbance as well as eroded places, crop plantations, and pastures. Caesarweed is considered an invasive species in the state of Florida, United States. There it grows as an annual in most areas except for in the southern region, where it may live perennially. In Florida, the plant has been reported to grow rapidly from 0.5 meters (1.6 ft) to 2 meters (6.6 ft) by the end of its first year of growth. The plant is not competitive in tall grasses or under canopies.

The University of Florida's pest management procedures for handling this plant include prevention through treating before seeds form and maneuvering vehicles to avoid driving near Caesarweed, mulching and shading to prevent germination, and the use of chemical herbicides.

== Uses ==
Urena lobata was grown as a fibre crop in Sierra Leone during the 1970s and 1980s, but it had limited success as a crop.

== Aguaxima in L'Encyclopédie ==
In the 1751 reference work Encyclopédie (Vol. 1, p. 191), Denis Diderot wrote an entry about the plant under Aguaxima, a common Portuguese name for it. The entry is notable not for its one-sentence description ("Aguaxima, a plant growing in Brazil and on the islands of South America."), but for Diderot's editorializing that follows it. Frustrated by the uselessness of such a poor article, he muses about what audience it could possibly serve. His conclusion is a critique of the popular assumption that encyclopedias should be measured according to their breadth or comprehensiveness rather than quality.

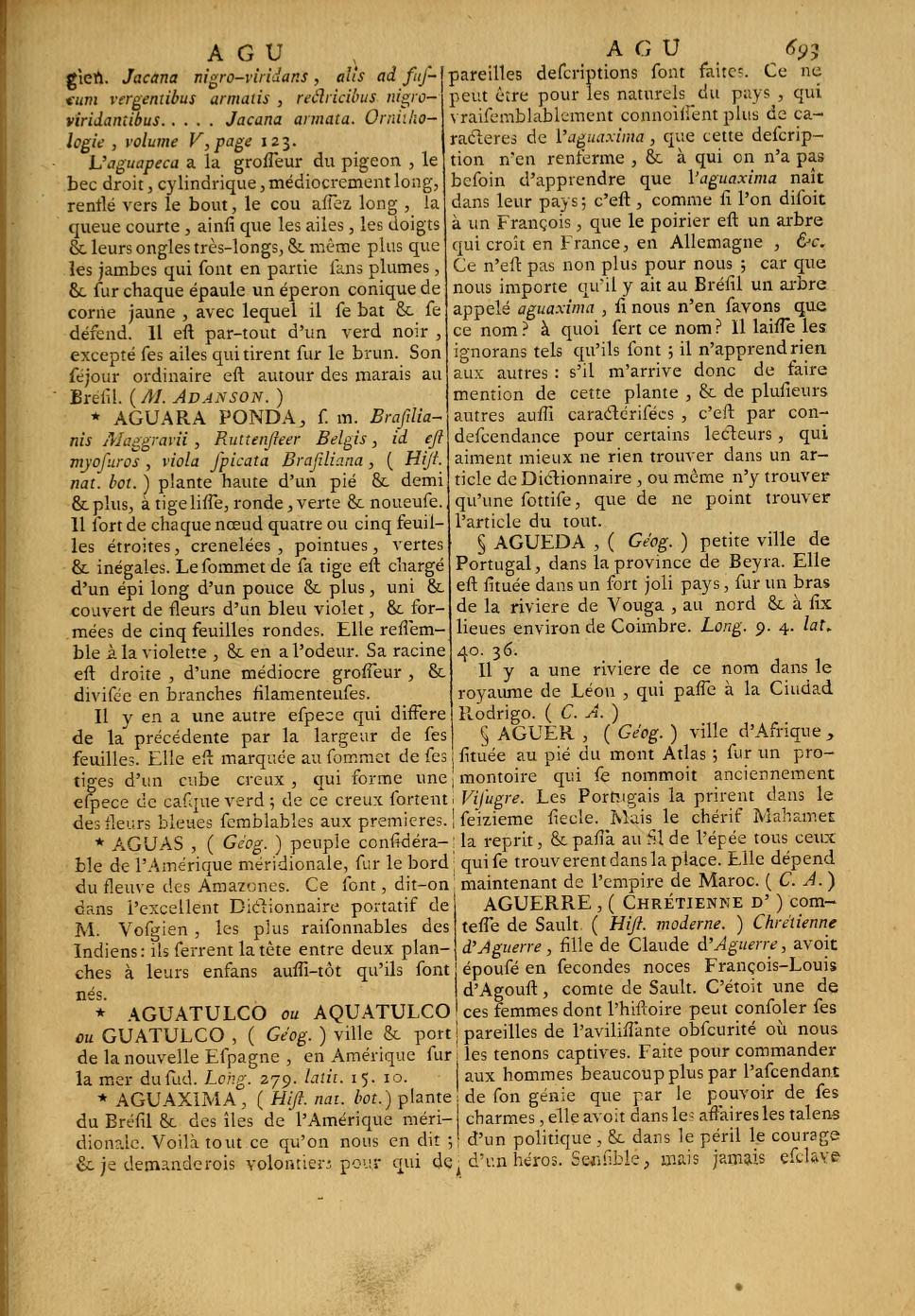
Page 693 of the Encyclopédie (3rd edition, volume 1)

Detail of Urena lobata foliage

Urena lobata fruit

Aguaxima, a plant growing in Brazil and on the islands of South America. This is all that we are told about it; and I would like to know for whom such descriptions are made. It cannot be for the natives of the countries concerned, who are likely to know more about the aguaxima than is contained in this description, and who do not need to learn that the aguaxima grows in their country. It is as if you said to a Frenchman that the pear tree is a tree that grows in France, in Germany, etc. It is not meant for us either, for what do we care that there is a tree in Brazil named aguaxima, if all we know about it is its name? What is the point of giving the name? It leaves the ignorant just as they were and teaches the rest of us nothing. If all the same I mention this plant here, along with several others that are described just as poorly, then it is out of consideration for certain readers who prefer to find nothing in a dictionary article or even to find something stupid than to find no article at all.
