= Anomini =

Scientific classification
- Kingdom: Animalia
- Phylum: Arthropoda
- Clade: Pancrustacea
- Class: Insecta
- Order: Lepidoptera
- Superfamily: Noctuoidea
- Family: Erebidae
- Subfamily: Scoliopteryginae
- Tribe: Anomini; Grote, 1882

Tribe of moths

The Anomini are a tribe of moths in the family Erebidae.

== Genera ==
- Alabama
- Anomis
- Dinumma
