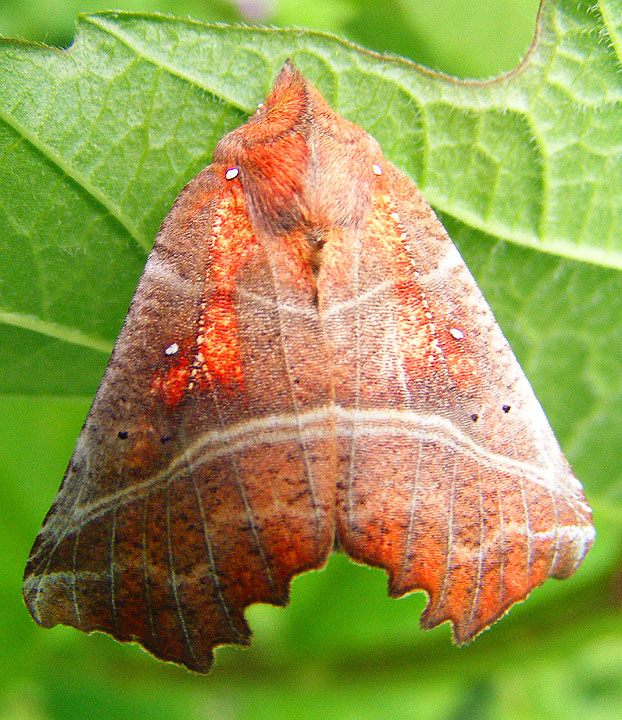
- The Herald (Scoliopteryx libatrix) is a moth of the family Noctuidae -photo by P.B.Toman

Scientific classification
- Kingdom: Animalia
- Phylum: Arthropoda
- Clade: Pancrustacea
- Class: Insecta
- Order: Lepidoptera
- Superfamily: Noctuoidea
- Family: Erebidae
- Subfamily: Scoliopteryginae; Herrich-Schäffer, [1852]

= Scoliopteryginae =

Subfamily of moths

The Scoliopteryginae are a subfamily of moths in the family Erebidae. Larvae have distinctive, extra setae on the first through seventh abdominal segments. Many adult moths in the subfamily have a proboscis adapted to pierce fruit skin, allowing consumption of the juice in the fruit.

== Taxonomy ==
Phylogenetic studies have shown that this subfamily is a strongly supported, monophyletic group containing the tribes Anomini and Scoliopterygini, which had previously been included in the subfamily Calpinae of the family Noctuidae.

== Tribes ==
- Anomini
- Scoliopterygini
