= List of Lepidoptera of Guadeloupe =

Location of Guadeloupe

The Lepidoptera of Guadeloupe consist of both the butterflies and moths recorded from the island of Guadeloupe.

According to a recent estimate, there are about 398 moth species and 58 butterfly species present in Guadeloupe.

== Butterflies ==
=== Papilionidae ===
- Battus polydamas neodamas (Lucas, 1852)

=== Hesperiidae ===
- Proteides mercurius angasi Godman & Salvin, 1884
- Epargyreus zestos zestos (Geyer, 1832)
- Polygonus leo leo (Gmelin, 1790)
- Polygonus manueli punctus Bell & Comstock, 1948
- Urbanus proteus domingo (Scudder, 1872)
- Urbanus dorantes obscurus (Hewitson, 1867)
- Astraptes talus (Cramer, 1777)
- Astraptes anaphus anusis (Godman & Salvin, 1896)
- Achlyodes mithridates minor Comstock, 1944
- Ephyriades arcas arcas (Drury, 1773)
- Ephyriades brunnea dominicensis Bell & Comstock, 1948
- Pyrgus oileus oileus (Linné, 1767)
- Hylephila phyleus phyleus (Drury, 1773)
- Wallengrenia ophites (Mabille, 1878)
- Calpodes ethlius (Stoll, 1782)
- Panoquina panoquinoides panoquinoides Skinner, 1891
- Panoquina lucas woodruffi Watson, 1937
- Panoquina sylvicola (Herrich-Schäffer, 1865)
- Nyctelius nyctelius agari (Dillon, 1947)

=== Pieridae ===
- Appias drusilla boydi Comstock, 1943
- Ascia monuste f. virginia (Godart, 1819)
- Eurema daira palmira (Poey, 1846)
- Eurema lisa euterpe (Ménétriès, 1832)
- Eurema leuce antillarum Hall, 1936
- Eurema venusta emanona Dillon, 1947
- Eurema nisevemanoma (Dillon, 1947)
- Eurema elathea elathea (Cramer, 1777)
- Anteos maerula (Fabricius, 1775)
- Phoebis agarithe (Boisduval, 1836)
- Phoebis sennae marcellina (Cramer, 1777)
- Rhabdodryas trite watsoni (F. M. Brown, 1929)
- Aphrissa statira (Cramer, 1777)

=== Nymphalidae ===
- Danaus plexippus megalippe (Hübner, 1826)
- Anaea minor Hall, 1936
- Marpesia petreus (Cramer, 1776)
- Historis odius orion (Fabricius 1775)
- Hypolimnas misippus (Linné, 1764)
- Junonia genoveva (Cramer, 1782)
- Junonia evarete (Stoll, 1782)
- Anartia jatrophae (Linné, 1763)
- Biblis hyperia (Cramer, 1782)
- Vanessa cardui (Linné, 1758)
- Dryas iulia dominicana (Hall, 1917)
- Agraulis vanillae insularis Maynard, 1889

=== Lycaenidae ===
- Allosmaitia piplea (Godman & Salvin, 1896)
- Chlorostrymon simaethis (Drury, 1773)
- Chlorostrymon lalitae Brévignon, 2000
- Ministrymon azia (Hewitson, 1873)
- Strymon bubastus ponce (Comstock & Huntington, 1943)
- Strymon columella (Fabricius, 1793)
- Strymon acis (Drury, 1773)
- Electrostrymon angerona (Godman & Salvin, 1896)
- Electrostrymon angelia karukera Brévignon, 2000
- Leptotes cassius chadwicki (Comstock & Huntington, 1943)
- Hemiargus hanno watsoni (Comstock & Huntington, 1943)
- Cyclargus thomasi woodruffi (Comstock & Huntington, 1943)

== Moths ==
=== Arctiidae ===
- Antichloris toddi Chalumeau & Howden, 1978
- Cosmosoma demantria Druce, 1895
- Ecpantheria guadulpensis (Oberthur, 1881)
- Empyreuma affinis Rotschild, 1912
- Episcepsis dominicensis Rotschild, 1911
- Eucereon cyneburge betzi Chalumeau & Howden, 1978
- Eucereon imriei Druce, 1884
- Eucereon rogersi Druce, 1884
- Eupseudosoma involutum (Sepp, [1855])
- Halysidota leda (Druce, 1890)
- Horama panthalon (Fabricius, 1793)
- Horama pretus (Cramer, 1777)
- Hyalurga vinosa (Drury, [1773])
- Hypercompe icasia (Cramer, 1777)
- Napata rabdonota Hampson, 1898
- Nyridela chalciope Hübner, 1898
- Opharus bimaculata (Dewitz, 1877)
- Pachydota albiceps (Walker, 1856)
- Pheia daphaena Hampson, 1898
- Pseudamastus alsa:
  - Pseudamastus alsa alsa (Druce, 1890)
  - Pseudamastus alsa lalannei Toulgoët, 1985
- Syntomeida epilais epilais (Walker, 1954)
- Syntomeida melanthus merletti Chalumeau & Howden, 1978
- Utetheisa ornatrix (Linné, 1758)

=== Cossidae ===
- Givera species

=== Notodontidae ===
- Nystalea nyseus (Cramer, 1775)
- Nystalea ebalea (Stoll, 1780)
- Proalymiotis aequipars (Walker, 1858)
- Rhuda focula (Stoll, 1780)
- Malocampa punctata (Stoll, 1780)
- Rifargia occulta Schaus, 1905
- Disphragis cubana (Grote, 1865)
- Hemiceras domingonis Dyar, 1908
- Rhuda focula (Stoll, 1780)
- Dasylophia lucia Schaus, 1901

=== Sphingidae ===
- Agrius cingulatus (Fabricius, 1775)
- Cocytius antaeus (Drury, 1773)
- Cocytius duponchel (Poey, 1832)
- Neococytius cluentius (Cramer, 1779)
- Manduca rustica harterti (Rotschild, 1894)
- Manduca sexta luciae (Johanssen, 1764)
- Protambulyx strigilis (Linné, 1771)
- Pseudosphinx tetrio (Linné, 1771)
- Erinnyis lassauxi (Boisduval, 1859)
- Erinnyis ello (Linné, 1758)
- Erinnyis alope (Drury, 1773)
- Erinnyis obscura (Fabricius, 1775)
- Erinnyis oenotrus (Stoll, 1780)
- Erinnyis crameri (Schauss, 1898)
- Pachylia ficus (Linné, 1758)
- Pachylia syces syces (Hübner, 1822)
- Enyo lugubris (Linné, 1771)
- Enyo ocypete (Linné, 1758)
- Madoryx oiclus (Cramer, 1779)
- Perigonia lusca (Fabricius, 1777)
- Aellopos tantalus (Linné, 1758)
- Aellopos fadus (Cramer, 1775)
- Eumorpha vitis (Linné, 1758)
- Eumorpha fasciatus (Sulzer, 1776)
- Eumorpha labruscae (Linné, 1758)
- Eumorpha obliquus guadelupensis Chalumeau & Delplanque, 1974
- Xylophanes tersa (Linné, 1771)
- Xylophanes pluto (Fabricius, 1777)
- Xylophanes chiron necchus (Cramer, 1779)
- Hyles lineata (Fabricius, 1775)

=== Geometridae ===
- Acratodes noctuata Guenée, 1858
- Acratodes praepeditaria (Möschler, 1890)
- Ametris nitocris (Cramer, 1780)
- Anisodes ordinata rubrior Herbulot, 1988
- Anisodes urcearia Guenée, 1858
- Chloropteryx glauciptera (Hampson, 1895)
- Cyclomia mopsaria Guenée, 1858
- Cyclophora nanaria (Walker, 1861)
- Disclisioprocta stellata (Guenée, 1857)
- Drepanodes ephyrata Guenée, 1857
- Eois tegularia (Guenée, 1857)
- Epimecis detexta:
  - Epimecis detexta detexta (Walker, 1860)
  - Epimecis detexta leduchatae Herbulot, in litt
- Erastria decrepitaria (Hübner, 1823)
- Erosina hyberniata Guenée 1857
- Eueana simplaria Herbulot, 1986
- Euphyia perturbata (Walker, 1862)
- Eupithecia acidalioides (Kaye, 1901)
- Eupithecia carribeana Herbulot, 1986
- Eupithecia comes Herbulot, 1986
- Eupithecia lecerfiata Herbulot, 1984
- Eupithecia velutipennis Herbulot, 1986
- Hydata insatisfacta Herbulot, 1988
- Leptocnenopsis tatochorda Prout, 1916
- Lobocleta indecora Warren, 1900
- Lobocleta martinicensis Herbulot, 1985
- Lobocleta tricuspida Herbulot, 1985
- Macrosema immaculata (Warren, 1897)
- Malanolophia lalanneae Herbulot, 1985
- Melanchroia chephise (Stoll, 1782)
- Melanolophia ludovici Herbulot, 1995
- Melanolophia rufimontis Herbulot, 1986
- Nemoria rectilinea (Warren, 1906)
- Nepheloleuca complicata (Guenée, 1857)
- Nepheloleuca politia (Cramer, 1777)
- Obila defensata (Walker, 1862)
- Oenoptila nigrilineata venusta Warren, 1900
- Oospila confundaria (Möschler, 1890)
- Oxydia brevipecten Herbulot, 1985
- Oxydia lalanneorum Herbulot, 1985
- Oxydia vesulia alternata (Warren, 1905)
- Pero astapa (Druce, 1892)
- Pero lignata (Warren, 1897)
- Pero rectisectaria (Herrich-Schäffer, 1855)
- Phrudocentra centrifugaria impunctata (Warren, 1909)
- Phrygionis cruorata Warren, 1905
- Phrygionis dominica Prout, 1933
- Pleuroplucha molitaria guadelupa Herbulot, 1995
- Psaliodes subochreofusa Herbulot, 1988
- Pterocypha lezardata Herbulot, 1988
- Ptychamalia perlata nigricostata (Warren, 1907)
- Scelolophia terminata fragmentata (Warren, 1904)
- Scopula umbilicata (Fabricius, 1794)
- Semaeopus caecaria distinctata (Warren, 1900)
- Semaeopus indignaria (Guenée, 1858)
- Semaeopus subrubra dominicana Prout, 1918
- Semaeopus vincentii luciae Prout, 1938
- Semiothisa praelongata bruni Herbulot, 1985
- Semiothisa everiata (Guenée, 1857)
- Sericoptera mahometaria (Herrich-Schäffer, 1853)
- Sphacelodes brunneata Warren, 1907
- Synchlora cupedinaria guadelupensis Herbulot, 1988
- Synchlora frondaria Guenée, 1857
- Synchlora herbaria intacta (Warren, 1905)
- Synchlora isolata (Warren, 1900)
- Tricentrogyna crocantha Herbulot, 1988
- Tricentrogyna rubricosta (Hampson, 1895)
- Xanthorhoe picticolor Warren, 1990

=== Psychidae ===
- Oiketicus kirbyi Guilding, 1827

=== Yponomeutidae ===
- Atteva aurea (Fitch, 1856)

=== Noctuidae ===
- Acroria terens (Walker, 1857)
- Achaea ablunaris (Guenée, 1852)
- Agrapha oxygramma (Geyer, 1832)
- Agrotis malefida Guenée, 1852
- Agrotis repleta Walker, 1857
- Agrotis subterranea (Fabricius, 1794)
- Alabama argillacea (Hübner, 1823)
- Amyna octo (Guenée, 1852)
- Anicla infecta (Ochsenheimer, 1816)
- Anomis editrix (Guenée, 1852)
- Anomis illita Guenée, 1852
- Anomis impasta Guenée, 1852
- Antachara diminuta (Guenée, 1852)
- Antiblemma concinnula (Walker, 1865)
- Antiblemma imitans (Walker, 1858)
- Anticarsia gemmatalis Hübner, 1818
- Argyrogramma basigera (Walker, 1865)
- Argyrogramma verruca (Fabricius, 1794)
- Ascalapha odorata (Linné, 1758)
- Autoplusia illustrata (Guenée, 1852)
- Azeta repugnalis (Hübner, 1825)
- Bagisara repanda (Fabricius, 1793)
- Baniana ostia Druce, 1898
- Baniana veluticollis Hampson, 1898
- Bleptina araealis (Hampson, 1901)
- Bleptina hydrillalis Guenée, 1854
- Callopistria floridensis (Guenée, 1852)
- Callopistria mexicana Druce, 1889
- Catabena vitrina (Walker 1857)
- Caularis undulans Walker, 1857
- Characoma nilotica (Rogenhofer, 1881)
- Coenipeta bibitrix (Hübner, 1823)
- Coenobela paucula (Walker, 1858)
- Collomena filifera (Walker, 1857)
- Concana mundissima Walker, 1857
- Condica albigera (Guenée, 1852)
- Condica circuita (Guenée, 1852)
- Condica concisa (Walker, 1856)
- Condica cupentia (Cramer, 1779)
- Condica mobilis (Walker, 1856)
- Condica sutor (Guénée, 1852)
- Condica vacillans (Walker, 1858)
- Cropia infusa (Walker, 1857)
- Cydosia nobilitella (Cramer, 1779)
- Diphthera festiva (Fabricius, 1775)
- Dipterygia ordinarius (Butler, 1879)
- Dipterygia pallida (Dognin, 1907)
- Dyomyx jugator Le Duchat d'Aubigny, 1992
- Elaphria agrotina (Guenée, 1852)
- Elaphria chalcedonia (Hübner, 1808)
- Elaphria deltoides (Möschler, 1880)
- Elaphria devara (Druce, 1898)
- Elaphria nucicolora (Guenée, 1852)
- Ephyrodes cacata Guenée, 1852
- Epidromia pannosa Guenée, 1852
- Eriopyga herbuloti Le Duchat d'Aubigny, 1992
- Eublemma cinnamomea (Herrich-Schäffer, 1868)
- Eublemma recta (Guenée, 1852)
- Eudocima materna (Linné, 1767)
- Eulepidotis addens (Walker, 1858)
- Eulepidotis modestula (Herrich-Schäffer, 1869)
- Eulepidotis superior (Guenée, 1852)
- Eutelia ablatrix (Guenée, 1852)
- Eutelia piratica Schaus, 1940
- Feltia subterranea (Fabricius, 1794)
- Glympis eubolialis (Walker, 1865)
- Gonodes liquida (Möschler, 1886)
- Gonodonta bidens Geyer, 1832
- Gonodonta incurva (Sepp, 1840)
- Gonodonta nutrix (Stoll, 1780)
- Gonodonta parens Guenée, 1852
- Gonodonta sicheas (Cramer, 1777)
- Helicoverpa zea (Boddie, 1850)
- Heliothis subflexa (Guenée, 1852)
- Heliothis virescens (Fabricius, 1777)
- Hemeroblemma opigena (Drury, 1773)
- Hemeroplanis scopulepes Haworth, 1809
- Hemicephalis characteria (Stoll, 1790)
- Heripyga herbuloti Duchat d'Aubigny Marti et al., 2000
- Hormoschista latipalpis (Walker, 1858)
- Hypena abjuralis Walker, 1858
- Hypena androna Druce, 1890
- Hypena loxo Druce, 1890
- Hypena minualis Guenée, 1854
- Hypena porrectalis (Fabricius, 1794)
- Hypena vetustalis Guenée, 1854
- Hypocala andremona (Stoll, 1781)
- Isogona scindens (Walker, 1858)
- Janseodes melanospila (Guenée, 1852)
- Kakopoda progenies (Guenée, 1852)
- Lascoria orneodalis (Guenée, 1854)
- Lesmone cinerea (Butler, 1878)
- Lesmone formularis (Geyer, 1837)
- Lesmone hinna (Geyer, 1837)
- Lesmone porcia (Stoll, 1790)
- Letis hypnois (Hübner, 1821)
- Letis mycerina (Cramer, 1777)
- Leucania chejela (Schaus, 1921)
- Leucania dorsalis Walker, 1856
- Leucania humidicola Guenée, 1852
- Leucania inconspicua Herrich-Schäffer, 1868
- Leucania juncicola Guenée, 1852
- Leucania latiuscula Herrich-Schäffer, 1868
- Leucania senescens Möschler, 1890
- Leucania subpunctata (Harvey, 1875)
- Litoprosopus bahamensis Hampson, 1926
- Lophophora clanymoides Möschler, 1890
- Magusa orbifera (Walker, 1857)
- Makapta varians (Hampson, 1926)
- Mamestra soligena Möschler, 1886
- Massala asema Hampson, 1926
- Massala obvertens (Walker, 1858)
- Mastigophorus latipennis Herrich-Schäffer, 1870
- Melipotis acontioides (Guenée, 1852)
- Melipotis contorta (Guenée, 1852)
- Melipotis famelica (Guenée, 1852)
- Melipotis famelica (Guenée, 1852)
- Melipotis fasciolaris (Hübner, 1825)
- Melipotis goniosema (Hampson, 1926)
- Melipotis januaris (Guenée, 1852)
- Melipotis ochrodes (Guenée, 1852)
- Metalectra analis Schaus, 1916
- Metalectra praecisalis Hübner, 1823
- Metallata absumens (Walker, 1862)
- Metria decessa (Walker, 1857)
- Metria permixta (Schaus, 1911)
- Micrathetis triplex (Walker, 1857)
- Mocis latipes (Guenée, 1852)
- Mocis megas (Guenée, 1852)
- Mocis repanda (Fabricius, 1794)
- Motya abseuzalis Walker, 1859
- Motya flotsama (Dyar, 1914)
- Mouralia tinctoides (Guenée, 1852)
- Nagara clara (Stoll, 1782)
- Neogalea sunia (Guenée, 1852)
- Neophaenis meterythra Hampson, 1908
- Neostictoptera species
- Nola bistriga (Möschler, 1890)
- Obrima pyraloides Walker, 1856
- Ommatochila mundula (Zeller, 1872)
- Ophisma tropicalis Guenée, 1852
- Orthodes vesquesa (Dyar, 1913)
- Paectes arcigera (Guenée, 1852)
- Paectes canofusa (Hampson, 1898)
- Paectes obrotunda (Guenée, 1852)
- Palthis angustipennis Schaus, 1916
- Panula inconstans Guenée, 1852
- Parachabora abydas (Herrich-Schäffer, 1869)
- Paratrachea species
- Perasia garnoti (Guenée, 1852)
- Peteroma carilla Schaus, 1901
- Phalaenophana eudorealis (Guenée, 1854)
- Phlyctaina irrigualis Möschler, 1890
- Phyprosopus tristriga (Herrich-Schäffer, 1868)
- Physula albipunctilla Schaus, 1916
- Plusiodonta thomae Guenée, 1852
- Ponometia exigua (Fabricius, 1793)
- Pseudaletia species
- Pseudaletia sequax Franclemont, 1951
- Pseudoplusia includens (Walker, 1857)
- Ptichodis immunis (Guenée, 1852)
- Radara nealcesalis (Walker, 1859)
- Radara tauralis (Walker, 1865)
- Rejectaria karukerensis Lalanne-Cassou, 1992
- Remigia latipes Guenée, 1852
- Remigia repanda (Fabricius, 1794)
- Renodes aequalis (Walker, 1865)
- Renodes liturata (Walker, 1865)
- Rhamnocampa species
- Rivula pusilla Möschler, 1890
- Selenisa sueroides (Guenée, 1852)
- Speocropia scriptura (Walker, 1858)
- Spodoptera albula (Walker, 1857)
- Spodoptera androgea (Stoll, 1782)
- Spodoptera dolichos (Fabricius, 1794)
- Spodoptera eridania (Stoll, 1782)
- Spodoptera exigua (Hübner, 1808)
- Spodoptera frugiperda (J.E. Smith, 1797)
- Spodoptera latifascia (Walker, 1856)
- Spodoptera ornithogalli (Guenée, 1852)
- Spodoptera sunia Malausa & Kermarrec, 1982
- Spragueia margana (Fabricius, 1794)
- Spragueia perstructana (Walker, 1865)
- Syllectra congemmalis Hübner, 1823
- Syllectra erycata (Cramer, 1780)
- Synalamis toulgoeti Lalanne-Cassou, 1992
- Tandilia rodea (Schaus, 1894)
- Tetanolita borgesalis (Walker, 1859)
- Thioptera nigrofimbria (Guenée, 1852)
- Thursania grandirenalis Schaus, 1916
- Toxonprucha diffundens (Walker, 1858)
- Tripudia luda (Druce, 1898)
- Tripudia quadrifera (Zeller, 1874)
- Xanthopastis timais (Cramer, [1780])
- Zale erilda Schaus, 1940
- Zale fictilis (Guenée, 1852)
- Zale peruncta (Guenée, 1852)
- Zale strigimacula (Guenée, 1852)

=== Pterophoridae ===
- Adaina ambrosiae (Murtfeldt, 1880)
- Adaina bipunctata (Möschler, 1890)
- Adaina ipomoeae Bigot & Etienne, 2009
- Exelastis montischristi (Walsingham, 1897)
- Hepalastis pumilio (Zeller, 1873)
- Lantanophaga pusillidactyla (Walker, 1864)
- Megalorrhipida leucodactyla (Fabricius, 1794)
- Ochyrotica fasciata Walsingham, 1891
- Oidaematophorus devriesi Landry & Gielis, 1992
- Sphenarches anisodactylus (Walker, 1864)
- Stenoptilodes brevipennis (Zeller, 1874)

=== Pyralidae ===
- Aethiophysa falcatalis (Hampson, 1895)
- Argyria lacteella (Fabricius, 1794)
- Azochis euvexalis (Möschler, 1890)
- Bonchis munitalis (Lederer, 1863)
- Caphys bilineata (Stoll, [1781])
- Cliniodes euphrosinalis Möschler, 1886
- Condylorrhiza vestigialis (Guenée, 1854)
- Cryptobotys zoilusalis (Walker, 1859)
- Desmia flebilialis (Guenée, 1854)
- Desmia funeralis (Hübner, 1796)
- Diaphania costata (Fabricius, 1775)
- Diaphania elegans (Möschler, 1890)
- Diaphania hyalinata (Linnaeus, 1767)
- Diatraea saccharalis (Fabricius, 1794)
- Epicorsia cerata (Fabricius, 1795)
- Epitamyra minusculalis (Möschler, 1890)
- Eulepte concordalis Hübner, 1825
- Eulepte gastralis (Guenée, 1854)
- Glyphodes sibillalis Walker, 1859
- Herpetogramma phaeopteralis (Guenée, 1854)
- Hymenia perspectalis (Hübner, 1796)
- Hypsopygia nostralis (Guenée, 1854)
- Hypsipyla grandella (Zeller, 1848)
- Loxomorpha cambogialis (Guenée, 1854)
- Microthyris prolongalis (Guenée, 1854)
- Omiodes humeralis Guenée, 1854
- Omiodes indicata (Fabricius, 1775)
- Omiodes martyralis (Lederer, 1863)
- Pachypalpia dispilalis Hampson, 1895
- Palpita isoscelalis gourbeyrensis Munroe, 1959
- Palpita persimilis Munroe, 1959
- Palpita viettei Munroe, 1959
- Pococera atramentalis (Lederer, 1863)
- Pococera scabridella (Ragonot, 1889)
- Polygrammodes eleuata (Fabricius, 1777)
- Portentomorpha xanthialis (Guenée, 1854)
- Rhectocraspeda periusalis (Walker, 1859)
- Sathria internitalis (Guenée, 1854)
- Sparagmia gonoptera (Latreille, 1828)
- Syllepte pactolalis (Guenée, 1854)
- Syngamia florella (Stoll in Cramer & Stoll, 1781)
- Triuncidia eupalusalis (Walker, 1859)

=== Plutellidae ===
- Plutella xylostella (Linné, 1758)

=== Gracillariidae ===
- Macrosaccus gliricidius Davis, 2011

=== Tortricidae ===
- Lorita insulicola Razowski & Becker, 2007
