= Pheia dosithea =

Scientific classification
- Domain: Eukaryota
- Kingdom: Animalia
- Phylum: Arthropoda
- Class: Insecta
- Order: Lepidoptera
- Superfamily: Noctuoidea
- Family: Erebidae
- Subfamily: Arctiinae
- Genus: Pheia
- Species: P. dosithea

Binomial name
- Pheia dosithea Schaus, 1924

Species of moth

Pheia dosithea is a moth in the subfamily Arctiinae. It was described by Schaus in 1924. It is found in Venezuela.
