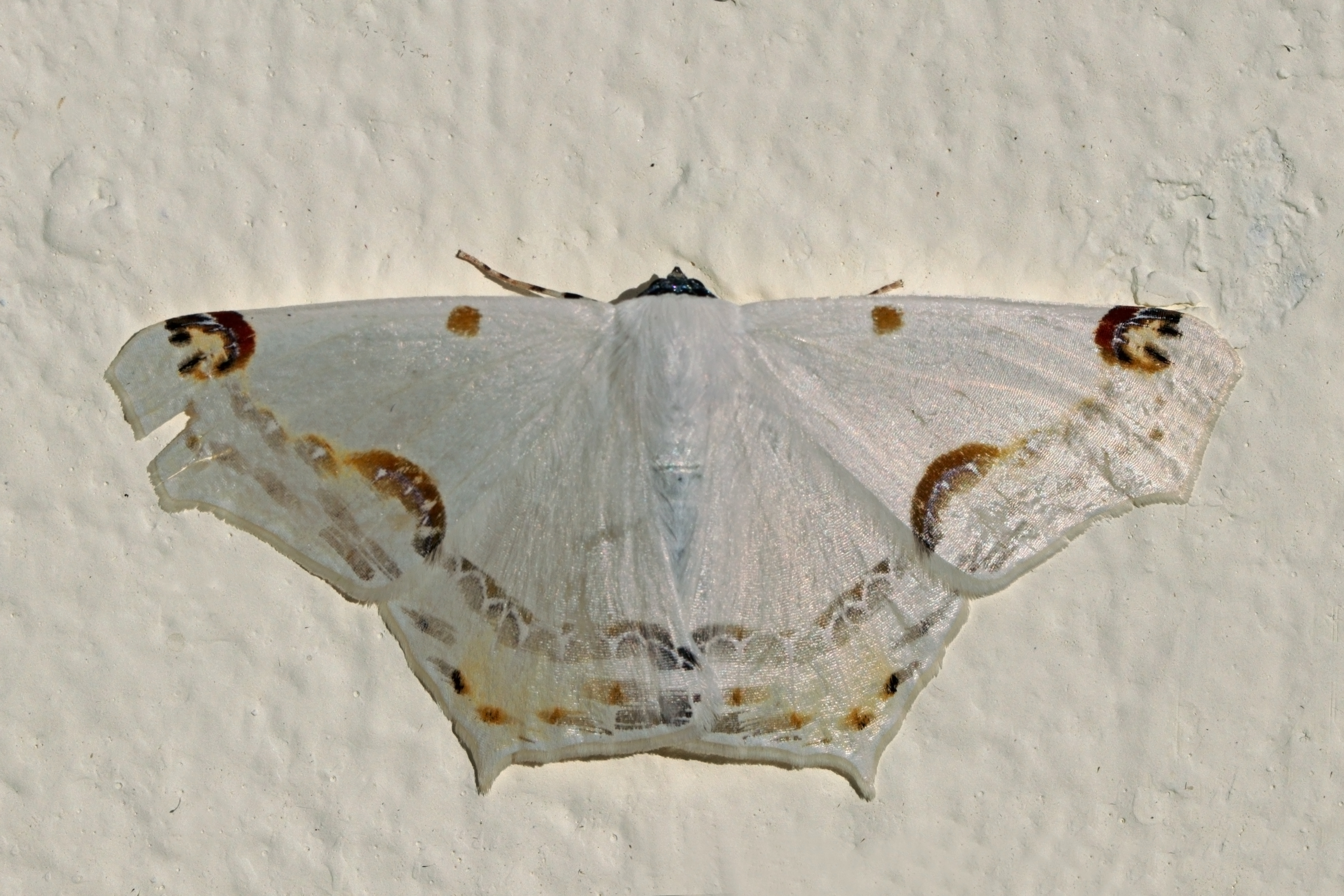
- Sericoptera mahometaria Mount Totumas cloud forest, Panama

Scientific classification
- Domain: Eukaryota
- Kingdom: Animalia
- Phylum: Arthropoda
- Class: Insecta
- Order: Lepidoptera
- Family: Geometridae
- Tribe: Ourapterygini
- Genus: Sericoptera; Herrich-Schäffer, 1855

Synonyms
- Ripula Guenée, [1858]; Syllexis Guenée, [1858]; Gonorthus Butler, 1883; Galactopteryx Warren, 1894

= Sericoptera =

Genus of moths

Sericoptera is a New World genus of moths in the family Geometridae erected by Gottlieb August Wilhelm Herrich-Schäffer in 1855. Adults of species in Sericoptera typically have white to cream wings with pale brown bands on the outer wings, sometimes dashed. Some but not all species have yellowish and dark blotches as additional wing markings. In some species, the bands are faint or absent. Species occur in the New World from Canada to Bolivia.

== Species ==
- Sericoptera virginaria (Hulst, 1886)
- Sericoptera chartaria (Guenée, 1857)
- Sericoptera mahometaria (Herrich-Schäffer, [1853]) - type species (as Geometra mahometaria)
- Sericoptera flavifimbria (Walker, 1860)
- Sericoptera penicillata (Warren, 1894)
- Sericoptera curvistriga (Warren, 1894)
- Sericoptera nigricornis (Warren, 1894)
