= Epitamyra =

Scientific classification
- Domain: Eukaryota
- Kingdom: Animalia
- Phylum: Arthropoda
- Class: Insecta
- Order: Lepidoptera
- Family: Pyralidae
- Subfamily: Chrysauginae
- Genus: Epitamyra; Ragonot, 1891

Genus of moths

Epitamyra is a genus of snout moths. It was described by Émile Louis Ragonot in 1891.

== Species ==
- Epitamyra albomaculalis (Möschler, 1890)
- Epitamyra birectalis Hampson, 1897
- Epitamyra minusculalis (Möschler, 1890)
