= Pheia gaudens =

Scientific classification
- Kingdom: Animalia
- Phylum: Arthropoda
- Class: Insecta
- Order: Lepidoptera
- Superfamily: Noctuoidea
- Family: Erebidae
- Subfamily: Arctiinae
- Genus: Pheia
- Species: P. gaudens

Binomial name
- Pheia gaudens (Walker, 1856)

Synonyms
- Poecilosoma gaudens Walker, 1856

Species of moth

Pheia gaudens is a moth in the subfamily Arctiinae. It was described by Francis Walker in 1856. It is found in Venezuela and Pará, Brazil.
