= Pheia pyrama =

Scientific classification
- Domain: Eukaryota
- Kingdom: Animalia
- Phylum: Arthropoda
- Class: Insecta
- Order: Lepidoptera
- Superfamily: Noctuoidea
- Family: Erebidae
- Subfamily: Arctiinae
- Genus: Pheia
- Species: P. pyrama

Binomial name
- Pheia pyrama Dognin, 1911

Species of moth

Pheia pyrama is a moth in the subfamily Arctiinae. It was described by Paul Dognin in 1911. It is found in French Guiana.
