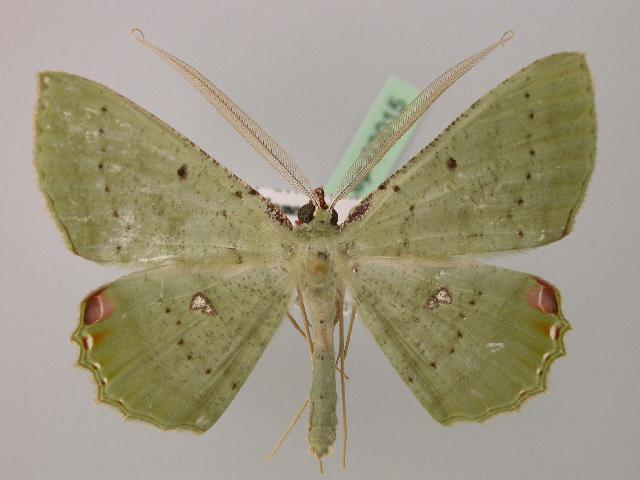
- Ametris nitocris

Scientific classification
- Kingdom: Animalia
- Phylum: Arthropoda
- Clade: Pancrustacea
- Class: Insecta
- Order: Lepidoptera
- Family: Geometridae
- Subfamily: Oenochrominae
- Genus: Ametris; Hübner, [1822]

Synonyms
- Mecoceras Guenee, 1857

= Ametris =

Genus of geometer moths

Ametris is a genus of moths in the family Geometridae.

== Species ==
- Ametris monilaria (Fabricius, 1776)
- Ametris nitocris (Cramer, 1780) – seagrape spanworm moth
