= Pheia beebei =

Scientific classification
- Domain: Eukaryota
- Kingdom: Animalia
- Phylum: Arthropoda
- Class: Insecta
- Order: Lepidoptera
- Superfamily: Noctuoidea
- Family: Erebidae
- Subfamily: Arctiinae
- Genus: Pheia
- Species: P. beebei

Binomial name
- Pheia beebei Fleming, 1957

Species of moth

Pheia beebei is a moth in the subfamily Arctiinae. It was described by Henry Fleming in 1957. It is found in Trinidad.
