= Pheia mathona =

Scientific classification
- Domain: Eukaryota
- Kingdom: Animalia
- Phylum: Arthropoda
- Class: Insecta
- Order: Lepidoptera
- Superfamily: Noctuoidea
- Family: Erebidae
- Subfamily: Arctiinae
- Genus: Pheia
- Species: P. mathona

Binomial name
- Pheia mathona (Dognin, 1891)

Synonyms
- Phacusa mathona Dognin, 1891

Species of moth

Pheia mathona is a moth in the subfamily Arctiinae. It was described by Paul Dognin in 1891. It is found in Ecuador.
