= Epitamyra albomaculalis =

Scientific classification
- Domain: Eukaryota
- Kingdom: Animalia
- Phylum: Arthropoda
- Class: Insecta
- Order: Lepidoptera
- Family: Pyralidae
- Genus: Epitamyra
- Species: E. albomaculalis

Binomial name
- Epitamyra albomaculalis (Möschler, 1890)

Synonyms
- Tamyra albomaculalis Möschler, 1890

Species of moth

Epitamyra albomaculalis is a species of snout moth. It was described by Heinrich Benno Möschler in 1890. It is found in Puerto Rico.
