= Pheia haemapera =

Scientific classification
- Domain: Eukaryota
- Kingdom: Animalia
- Phylum: Arthropoda
- Class: Insecta
- Order: Lepidoptera
- Superfamily: Noctuoidea
- Family: Erebidae
- Subfamily: Arctiinae
- Genus: Pheia
- Species: P. haemapera

Binomial name
- Pheia haemapera Schaus, 1898

Species of moth

Pheia haemapera is a moth in the subfamily Arctiinae. It was described by William Schaus in 1898. It is found in Santa Catarina, Brazil.
