= Triuncidia =

Scientific classification
- Domain: Eukaryota
- Kingdom: Animalia
- Phylum: Arthropoda
- Class: Insecta
- Order: Lepidoptera
- Family: Crambidae
- Subfamily: Pyraustinae
- Genus: Triuncidia; Munroe, 1976

Genus of moths

Triuncidia is a genus of moths of the family Crambidae.

== Species ==
- Triuncidia eupalusalis (Walker, 1859)
- Triuncidia ossealis (Hampson, 1899)
