= Triuncidia ossealis =

Scientific classification
- Kingdom: Animalia
- Phylum: Arthropoda
- Class: Insecta
- Order: Lepidoptera
- Family: Crambidae
- Genus: Triuncidia
- Species: T. ossealis

Binomial name
- Triuncidia ossealis (Hampson, 1899)

Synonyms
- Cybalomia ossealis Hampson, 1899

Species of moth

Triuncidia ossealis is a moth in the family Crambidae. It was described by George Hampson in 1899. It is found in Loja Province, Ecuador.
