= Pheia bisigna =

Scientific classification
- Domain: Eukaryota
- Kingdom: Animalia
- Phylum: Arthropoda
- Class: Insecta
- Order: Lepidoptera
- Superfamily: Noctuoidea
- Family: Erebidae
- Subfamily: Arctiinae
- Genus: Pheia
- Species: P. bisigna

Binomial name
- Pheia bisigna Kaye, 1911

Species of moth

Pheia bisigna is a moth in the subfamily Arctiinae. It was described by William James Kaye in 1911. It is found in Guyana.
