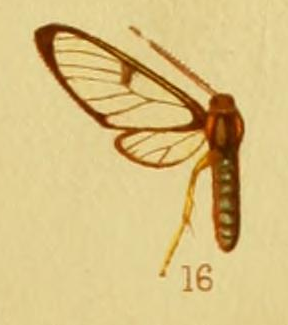

Scientific classification
- Domain: Eukaryota
- Kingdom: Animalia
- Phylum: Arthropoda
- Class: Insecta
- Order: Lepidoptera
- Superfamily: Noctuoidea
- Family: Erebidae
- Subfamily: Arctiinae
- Genus: Pheia
- Species: P. discophora

Binomial name
- Pheia discophora Dognin, 1909

= Pheia discophora =

Species of moth

Pheia discophora is a moth in the subfamily Arctiinae. It was described by Paul Dognin in 1909. It is found in Colombia.
