= Pheia =

Scientific classification
- Kingdom: Animalia
- Phylum: Arthropoda
- Class: Insecta
- Order: Lepidoptera
- Superfamily: Noctuoidea
- Family: Erebidae
- Subfamily: Arctiinae
- Tribe: Arctiini
- Subtribe: Euchromiina
- Genus: Pheia; Walker, 1854

Genus of moths

Pheia is a genus of moths in the subfamily Arctiinae erected by Francis Walker in 1854.

== Species ==
- Pheia admirabilis Bryk, 1953
- Pheia albisigna Walker, 1854
- Pheia attenuata Kaye, 1919
- Pheia beebei Fleming, 1957
- Pheia bisigna Kaye, 1911
- Pheia costalis Rothschild, 1911
- Pheia daphaena Hampson, 1898
- Pheia discophora Dognin, 1909
- Pheia dosithea Schaus, 1924
- Pheia elegans Druce, 1884
- Pheia flavicincta Dognin, 1906
- Pheia flavilateralis Gaede, 1926
- Pheia fuscicorpus Rothschild, 1931
- Pheia gaudens Walker, 1856
- Pheia haemapera Schaus, 1898
- Pheia haemapleura Hampson, 1914
- Pheia haematosticta E. D. Jones, 1908
- Pheia insignis Rothschild, 1931
- Pheia lateralis Klages, 1906
- Pheia marginata Gaede, 1926
- Pheia mathona Dognin
- Pheia nanata Kaye, 1919
- Pheia plebecula Dognin, 1902
- Pheia pseudelegans Rothschild, 1931
- Pheia pyrama Dognin, 1911
- Pheia regesta Draudt, 1915
- Pheia serpensis Kaye, 1919
- Pheia simillima Rothschild, 1931
- Pheia sperans Walker, 1856
- Pheia stratiotes Dyar, 1914
- Pheia taperinhae Dognin, 1923
- Pheia utica Druce, 1889
- Pheia xanthozona Dognin, 1910
