= Pheia flavicincta =

Scientific classification
- Domain: Eukaryota
- Kingdom: Animalia
- Phylum: Arthropoda
- Class: Insecta
- Order: Lepidoptera
- Superfamily: Noctuoidea
- Family: Erebidae
- Subfamily: Arctiinae
- Genus: Pheia
- Species: P. flavicincta

Binomial name
- Pheia flavicincta Dognin, 1906

Species of moth

Pheia flavicincta is a moth in the subfamily Arctiinae. It was described by Paul Dognin in 1906. It is found in Argentina.
