= Pheia elegans =

Scientific classification
- Domain: Eukaryota
- Kingdom: Animalia
- Phylum: Arthropoda
- Class: Insecta
- Order: Lepidoptera
- Superfamily: Noctuoidea
- Family: Erebidae
- Subfamily: Arctiinae
- Genus: Pheia
- Species: P. elegans

Binomial name
- Pheia elegans (H. Druce, 1884)

Synonyms
- Cosmosoma elegans H. Druce, 1884; Cosmosoma drucei Kirby, 1892; Cosmosoma cingla Schaus, 1894

Species of moth

Pheia elegans is a moth in the subfamily Arctiinae. It was described by Herbert Druce in 1884. It is found in Mexico, Guatemala, Panama, Costa Rica and Venezuela.
