= Epitamyra birectalis =

Scientific classification
- Kingdom: Animalia
- Phylum: Arthropoda
- Clade: Pancrustacea
- Class: Insecta
- Order: Lepidoptera
- Family: Pyralidae
- Genus: Epitamyra
- Species: E. birectalis

Binomial name
- Epitamyra birectalis Hampson, 1897

Species of moth

Epitamyra birectalis is a species of snout moth in the genus Epitamyra. It was described by George Hampson in 1897, and is known from the Lesser Antilles (including Saint Lucia), Guatemala and Florida.
