= Pheia sperans =

Scientific classification
- Kingdom: Animalia
- Phylum: Arthropoda
- Class: Insecta
- Order: Lepidoptera
- Superfamily: Noctuoidea
- Family: Erebidae
- Subfamily: Arctiinae
- Genus: Pheia
- Species: P. sperans

Binomial name
- Pheia sperans (Walker, 1856)

Synonyms
- Poecilosoma sperans Walker, 1856

Species of moth

Pheia sperans is a moth in the subfamily Arctiinae. It was described by Francis Walker in 1856. It is found in Colombia and the Amazon region.
