= Pheia flavilateralis =

Scientific classification
- Domain: Eukaryota
- Kingdom: Animalia
- Phylum: Arthropoda
- Class: Insecta
- Order: Lepidoptera
- Superfamily: Noctuoidea
- Family: Erebidae
- Subfamily: Arctiinae
- Genus: Pheia
- Species: P. flavilateralis

Binomial name
- Pheia flavilateralis Gaede, 1926

Species of moth

Pheia flavilateralis is a moth in the subfamily Arctiinae. It was described by Max Gaede in 1926. It is found in Brazil.
