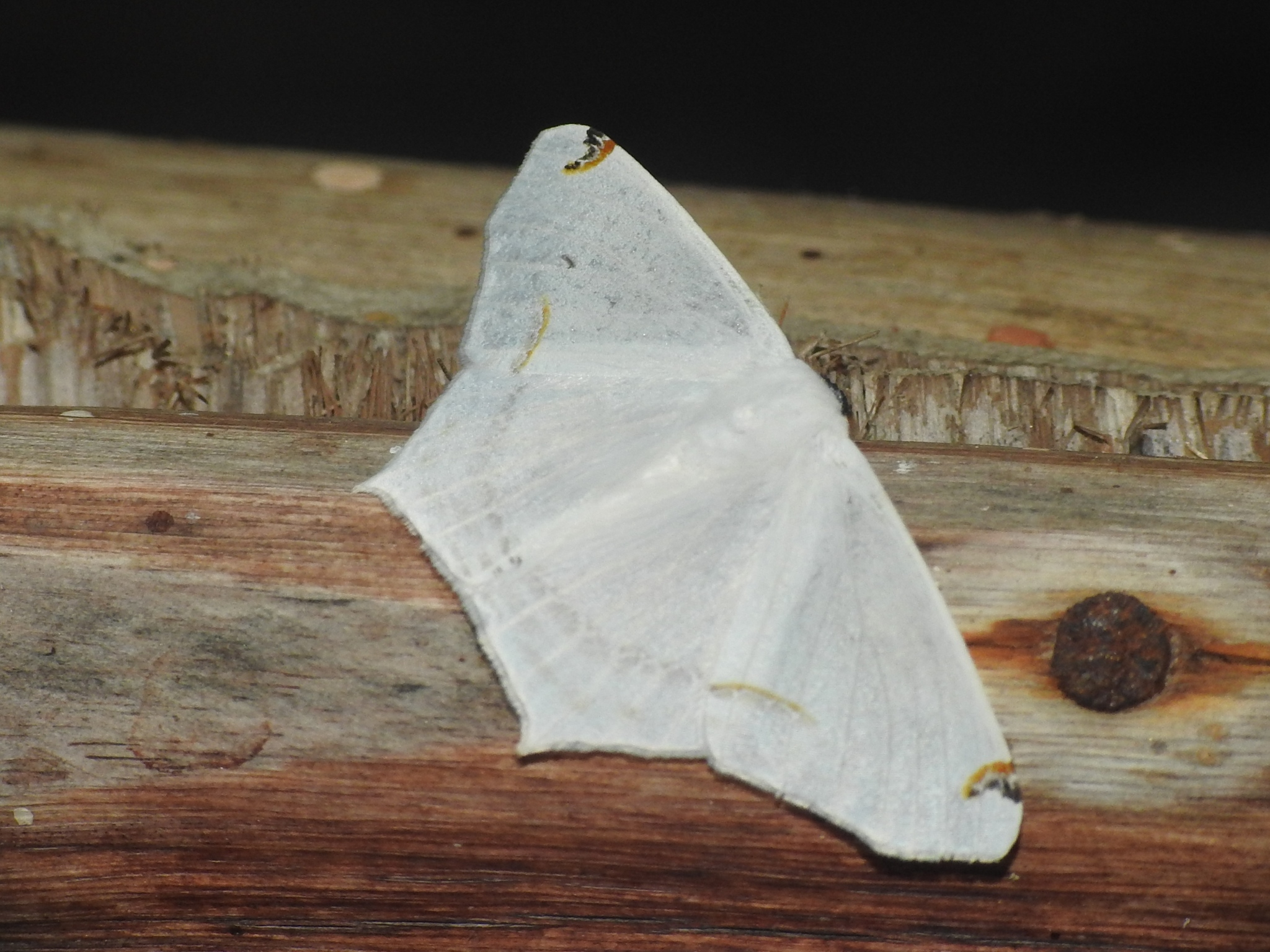

Scientific classification
- Domain: Eukaryota
- Kingdom: Animalia
- Phylum: Arthropoda
- Class: Insecta
- Order: Lepidoptera
- Family: Geometridae
- Genus: Sericoptera
- Species: S. virginaria

Binomial name
- Sericoptera virginaria (Hulst, 1886)

Synonyms
- Sericoptera insularis Warren, 1909; Sericoptera vestalis (Hulst, 1898)

= Sericoptera virginaria =

Species of moth

Sericoptera virginaria is a species of geometrid moth in the family Geometridae. It is found in North America.

The MONA or Hodges number for Sericoptera virginaria is 6994.
