= Pheia attenuata =

Scientific classification
- Domain: Eukaryota
- Kingdom: Animalia
- Phylum: Arthropoda
- Class: Insecta
- Order: Lepidoptera
- Superfamily: Noctuoidea
- Family: Erebidae
- Subfamily: Arctiinae
- Genus: Pheia
- Species: P. attenuata

Binomial name
- Pheia attenuata Kaye, 1919

Species of moth

Pheia attenuata is a moth in the subfamily Arctiinae. It was described by William James Kaye in 1919. It is found in Panama.
