= Pheia utica =

Scientific classification
- Domain: Eukaryota
- Kingdom: Animalia
- Phylum: Arthropoda
- Class: Insecta
- Order: Lepidoptera
- Superfamily: Noctuoidea
- Family: Erebidae
- Subfamily: Arctiinae
- Genus: Pheia
- Species: P. utica

Binomial name
- Pheia utica (H. Druce, 1889)

Synonyms
- Dycladia utica H. Druce, 1889; Pheia proteria Schaus, 1924

Species of moth

Pheia utica is a moth in the subfamily Arctiinae. It was described by Herbert Druce in 1889. It is found in Mexico and Panama.
