= Pheia nanata =

Scientific classification
- Domain: Eukaryota
- Kingdom: Animalia
- Phylum: Arthropoda
- Class: Insecta
- Order: Lepidoptera
- Superfamily: Noctuoidea
- Family: Erebidae
- Subfamily: Arctiinae
- Genus: Pheia
- Species: P. nanata

Binomial name
- Pheia nanata Kaye, 1919

Species of moth

Pheia nanata is a moth in the subfamily Arctiinae. It was described by William James Kaye in 1919. According to Kaye, it has a black head and shoulders with metallic green spots. The first segment of its abdomen has sublateral red spots, and faint green dorsal spots. It is found in Peru.
