= Pheia haematosticta =

Scientific classification
- Domain: Eukaryota
- Kingdom: Animalia
- Phylum: Arthropoda
- Class: Insecta
- Order: Lepidoptera
- Superfamily: Noctuoidea
- Family: Erebidae
- Subfamily: Arctiinae
- Genus: Pheia
- Species: P. haematosticta

Binomial name
- Pheia haematosticta E. D. Jones, 1908

Species of moth

Pheia haematosticta is a moth in the subfamily Arctiinae. It was described by E. Dukinfield Jones in 1908. It is found in Paraná, Brazil.
