= Pheia xanthozona =

Scientific classification
- Domain: Eukaryota
- Kingdom: Animalia
- Phylum: Arthropoda
- Class: Insecta
- Order: Lepidoptera
- Superfamily: Noctuoidea
- Family: Erebidae
- Subfamily: Arctiinae
- Genus: Pheia
- Species: P. xanthozona

Binomial name
- Pheia xanthozona Dognin, 1910

Species of moth

Pheia xanthozona is a moth in the subfamily Arctiinae. It was described by Paul Dognin in 1910. It is found in French Guiana.
