= Pheia albisigna =

Scientific classification
- Kingdom: Animalia
- Phylum: Arthropoda
- Class: Insecta
- Order: Lepidoptera
- Superfamily: Noctuoidea
- Family: Erebidae
- Subfamily: Arctiinae
- Genus: Pheia
- Species: P. albisigna

Binomial name
- Pheia albisigna (Walker, 1854)

Synonyms
- Glaucopis albisigna Walker, 1854

Species of moth

Pheia albisigna is a moth in the subfamily Arctiinae. It was described by Francis Walker in 1854. It is found in Honduras and Tefé, Brazil.
