= Pheia admirabilis =

Scientific classification
- Kingdom: Animalia
- Phylum: Arthropoda
- Class: Insecta
- Order: Lepidoptera
- Superfamily: Noctuoidea
- Family: Erebidae
- Subfamily: Arctiinae
- Genus: Pheia
- Species: P. admirabilis

Binomial name
- Pheia admirabilis Bryk, 1953

Species of moth

Pheia admirabilis is a moth in the subfamily Arctiinae. It was described by Felix Bryk in 1953. It is found in the Amazon region.
