= Pheia haemapleura =

Scientific classification
- Kingdom: Animalia
- Phylum: Arthropoda
- Class: Insecta
- Order: Lepidoptera
- Superfamily: Noctuoidea
- Family: Erebidae
- Subfamily: Arctiinae
- Genus: Pheia
- Species: P. haemapleura

Binomial name
- Pheia haemapleura Hampson, 1914

Synonyms
- Pheia sandix Draudt, 1915

Species of moth

Pheia haemapleura is a moth in the subfamily Arctiinae. It was described by George Hampson in 1914. It is found in Brazil.
