= Eupithecia acidalioides =

Scientific classification
- Domain: Eukaryota
- Kingdom: Animalia
- Phylum: Arthropoda
- Class: Insecta
- Order: Lepidoptera
- Family: Geometridae
- Genus: Eupithecia
- Species: E. acidalioides

Binomial name
- Eupithecia acidalioides (Kaye, 1901)

Synonyms
- Psaliodes acidalioides Kaye, 1901

Species of geometer moth

Eupithecia acidalioides is a moth in the family Geometridae. It is found in Guadeloupe, Saint Martin, Trinidad and French Guiana.

It was first described (Note: as Psaliodes acidalioides) in 1901 by William James Kaye in his preliminary catalogue of the moths of Trinidad. He described the species as having brownish cream wings, detailed a number of black and blackish markings, and listed a wingspan of 15 mm.
