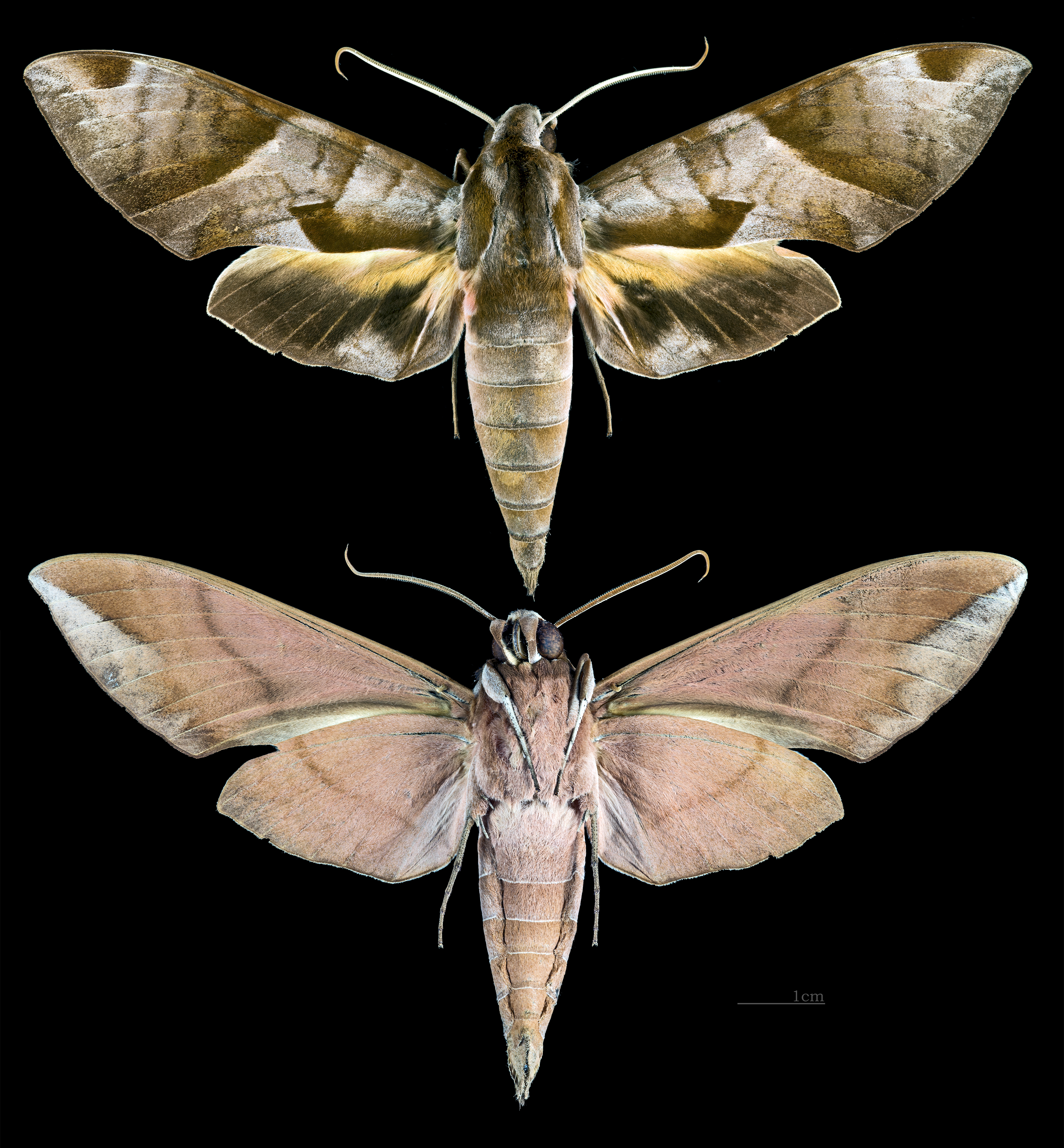
- Eumorpha obliquus above recto, below verso

Scientific classification
- Domain: Eukaryota
- Kingdom: Animalia
- Phylum: Arthropoda
- Class: Insecta
- Order: Lepidoptera
- Family: Sphingidae
- Genus: Eumorpha
- Species: E. obliquus

Binomial name
- Eumorpha obliquus (Rothschild & Jordan, 1903)

Synonyms
- Pholus obliquus Rothschild & Jordan, 1903; Pholus obliquus guadelupensis Chalumeau & Delplanque, 1974; Pholus obliquus orientis Daniel, 1949

= Eumorpha obliquus =

Species of moth

Eumorpha obliquus is a moth of the family Sphingidae. It is found from Belize, Guatemala, Nicaragua and Costa Rica south to Bolivia. It is also present in Brazil and Guadeloupe.

The wingspan is 130–136 mm. It is similar to Eumorpha anchemolus, but the forewing is shorter, broader with an even outer margin. There is a strong contrast between the generally light basal half and the generally dark apical half of the forewing upperside. The underside of the body and wings is yellowish.

Adults are on wing year round.

The larvae feed on grape species. The larvae of subspecies guadelupensis have been recorded feeding on Cissus sicyoides.

== Subspecies ==
- Eumorpha obliquus obliquus (Belize, Guatemala, Nicaragua and Costa Rica south to Bolivia)
- Eumorpha obliquus guadelupensis (Chalumeau & Delplanque, 1974) (Guadeloupe)
- Eumorpha obliquus orientis (Daniel, 1949) (Brazil)
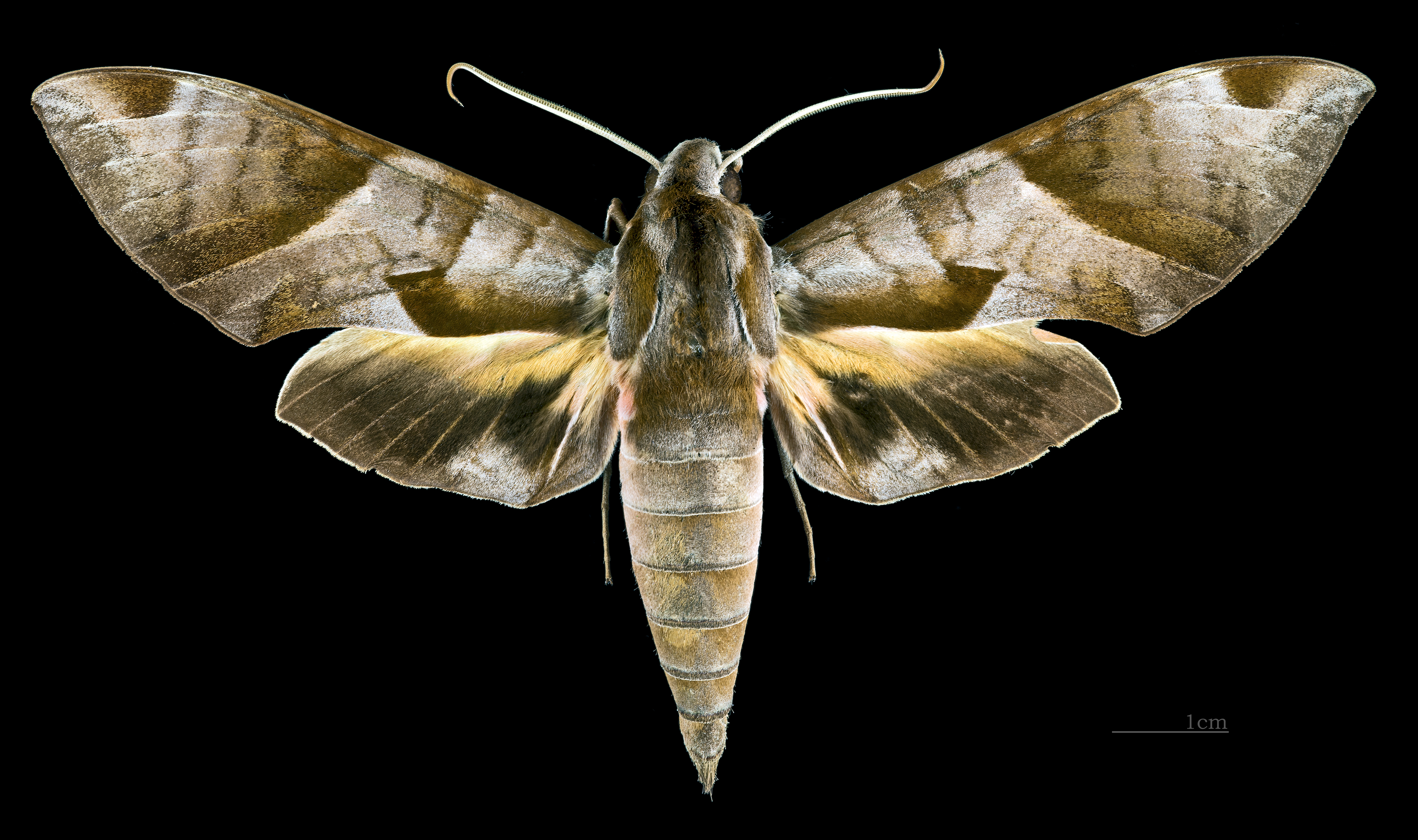
Eumorpha obliquus guadelupensis dorsal male MHNT

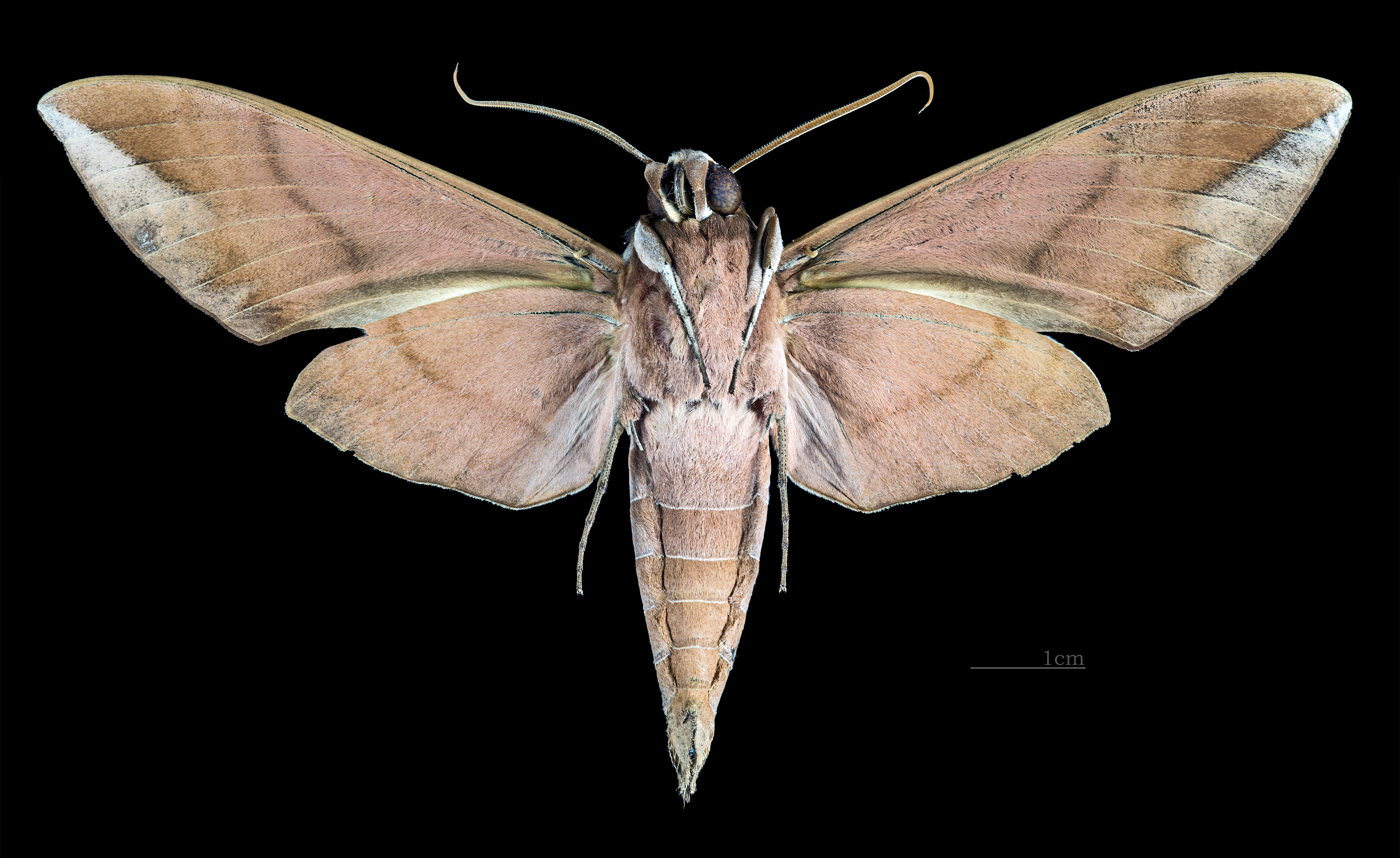
Eumorpha obliquus guadelupensis ventral male MHNT

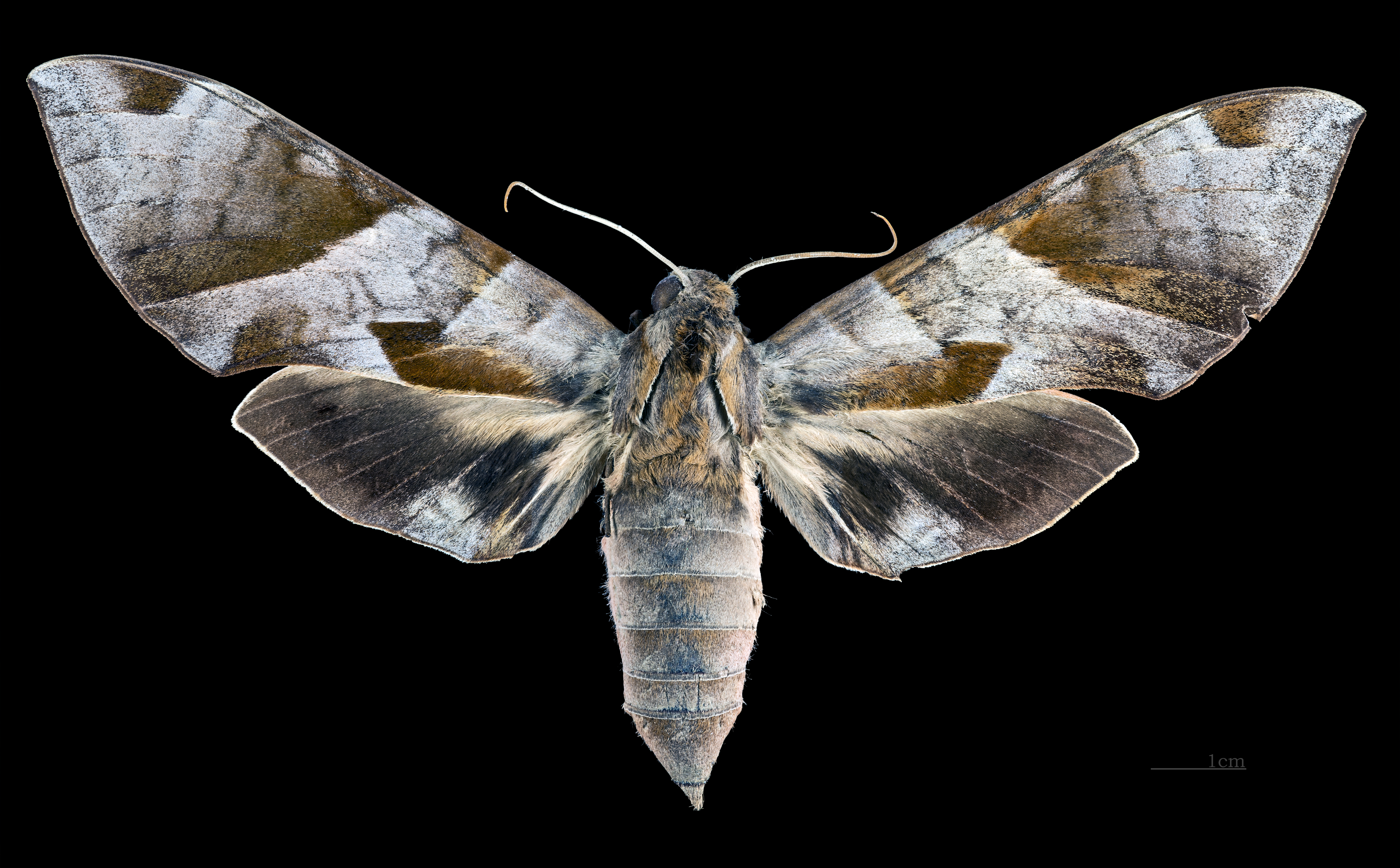
Eumorpha obliquus guadelupensis dorsal female MHNT

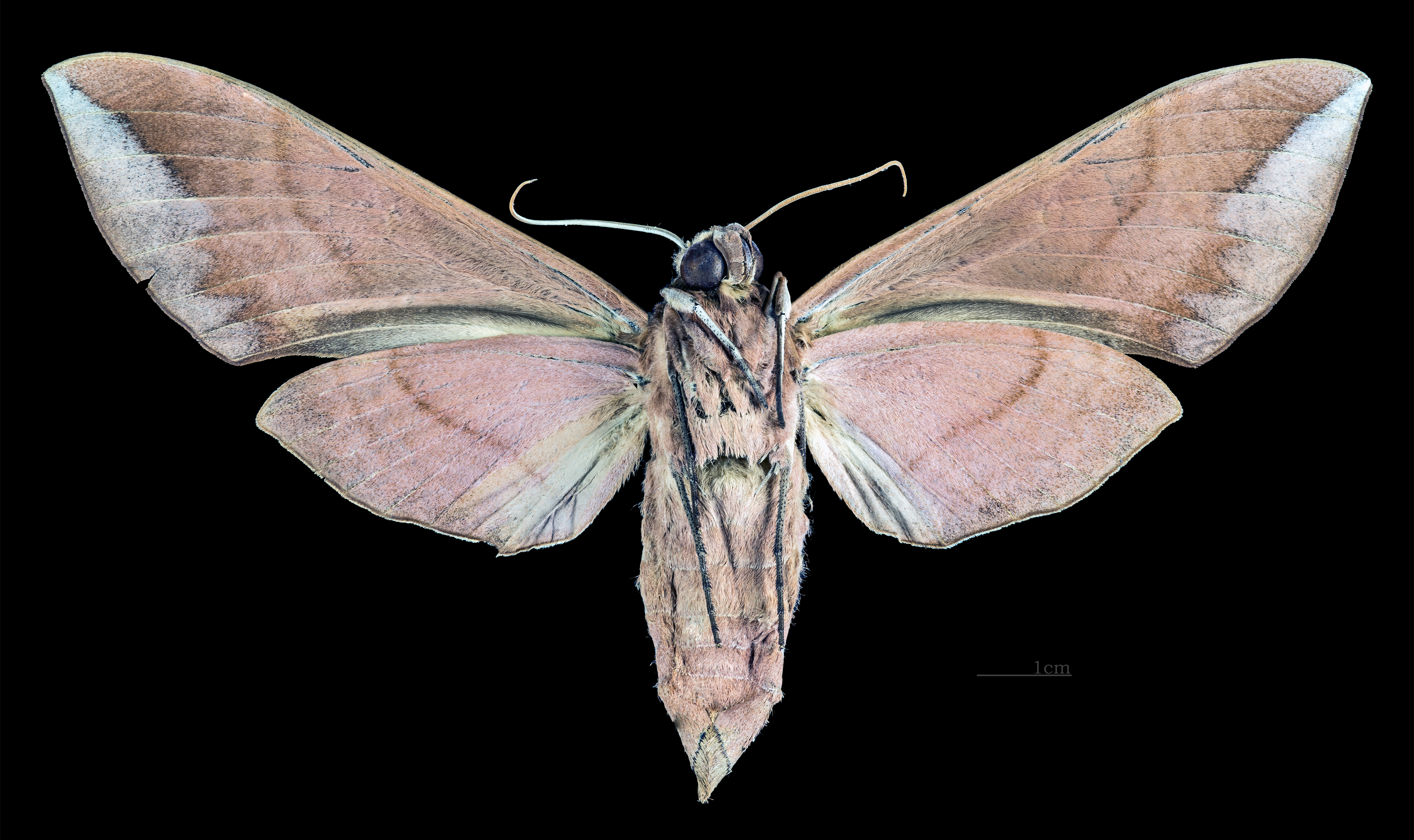
Eumorpha obliquus guadelupensis ventralfemale MHNT
