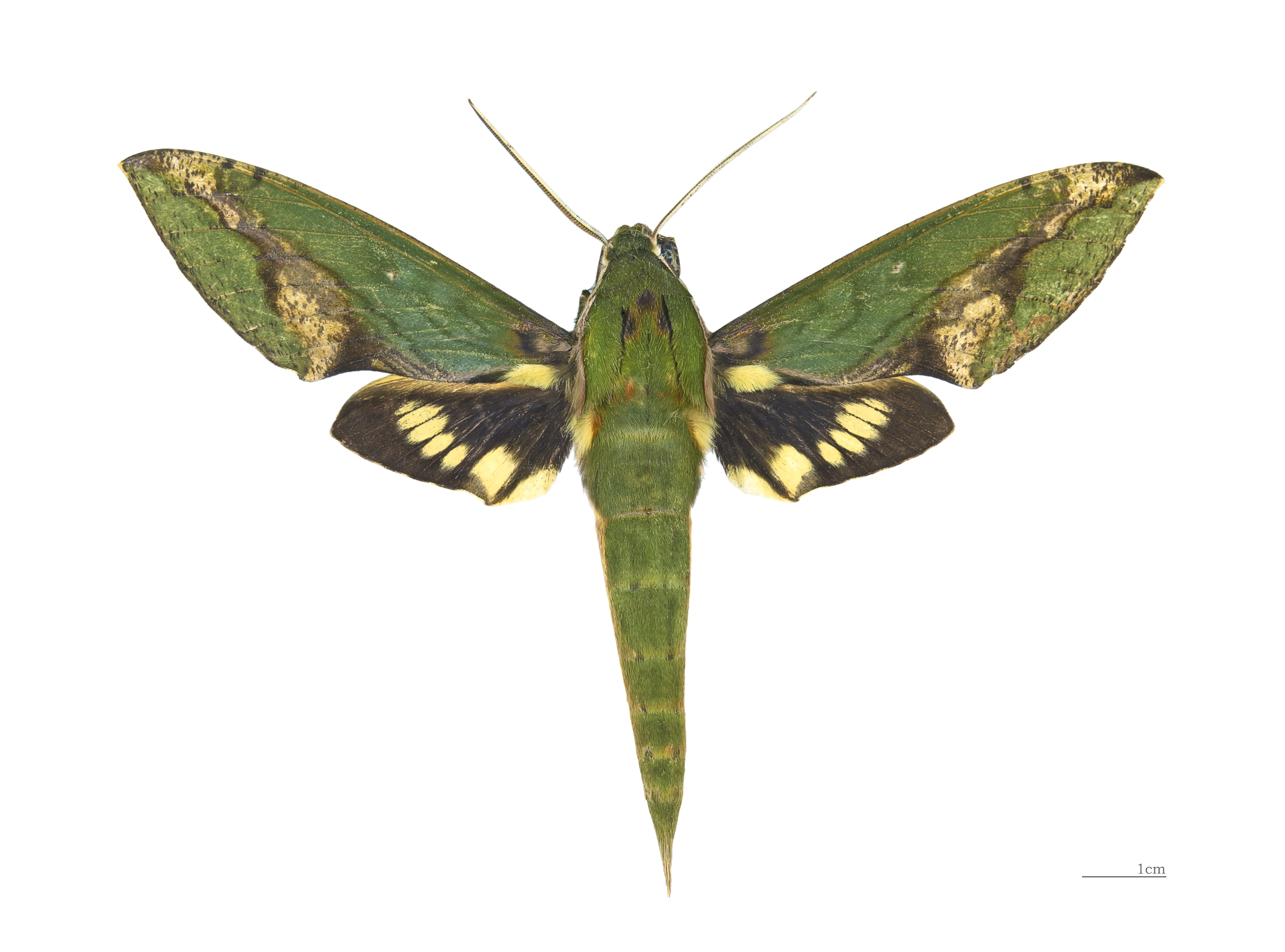
- Upperside
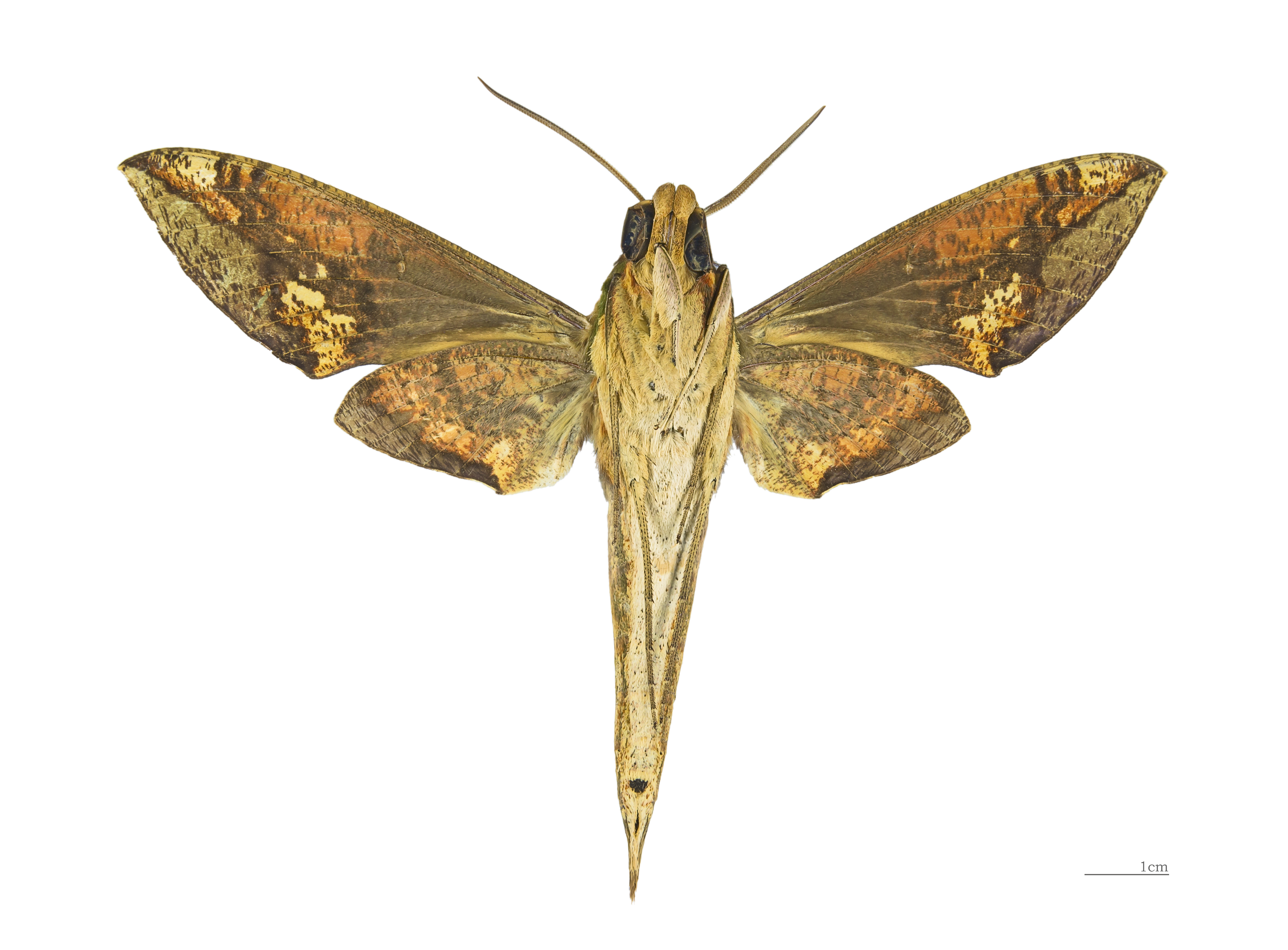
- Underside

Scientific classification
- Kingdom: Animalia
- Phylum: Arthropoda
- Class: Insecta
- Order: Lepidoptera
- Family: Sphingidae
- Genus: Xylophanes
- Species: X. chiron

Binomial name
- Xylophanes chiron (Drury, 1771)

Synonyms
- Sphinx chiron Drury, 1773; Sphinx sagittata Goeze, 1780; Sphinx butus Fabricius, 1787; Choerocampa druryi Boisduval, 1875; Choerocampa haitensis Butler, 1875; Sphinx chiron nechus Cramer, 1777; Xylophanes chiron martiniquensis Kernbach, 1964

= Xylophanes chiron =

Species of moth

Xylophanes chiron is a moth of the family Sphingidae. It was first described by Dru Drury in 1771.

== Distribution ==
It can be found in Mexico down to northern Argentina and in Guadeloupe, Martinique and Jamaica.

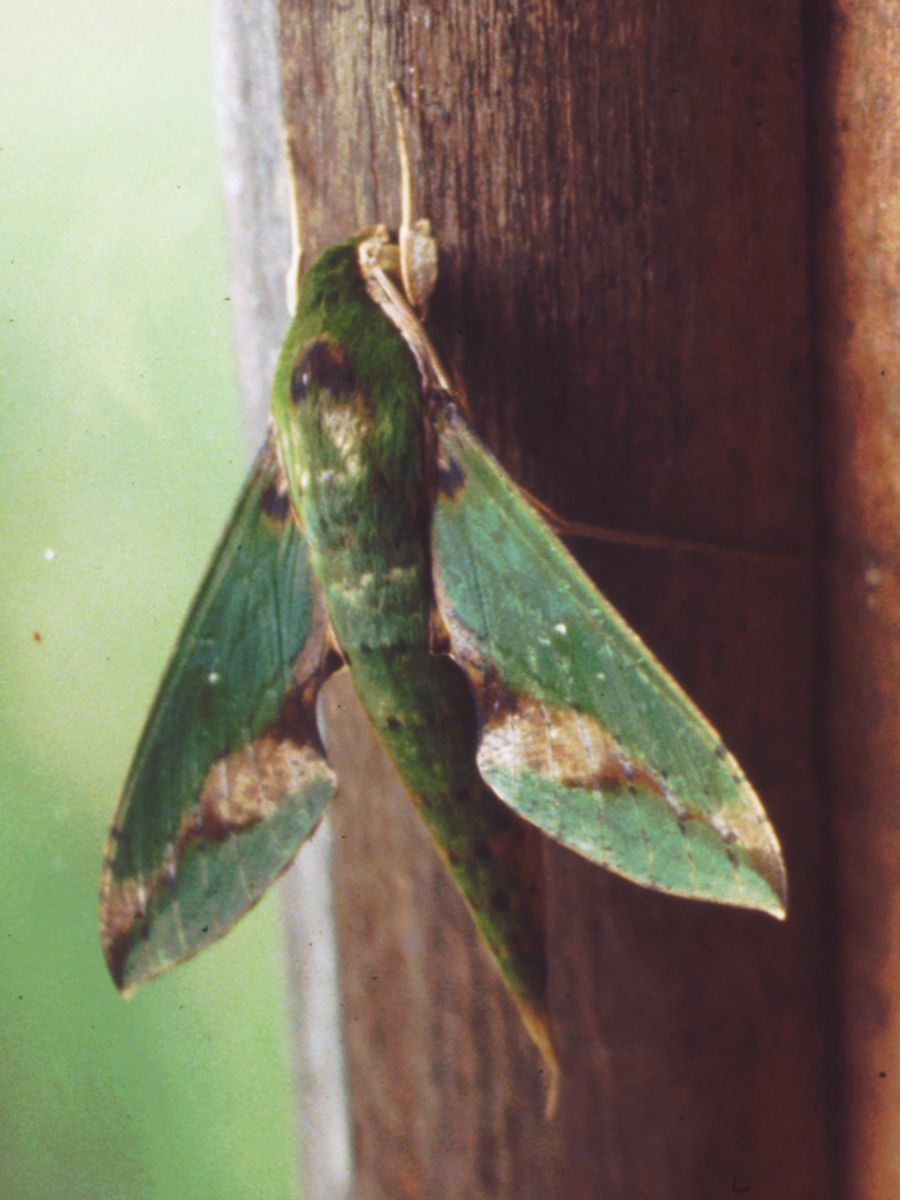

== Description ==
The wingspan range is 77–81 mm.

== Biology ==
The larvae feed on Rubiaceae species.

== Subspecies ==
- Xylophanes chiron chiron
- Xylophanes chiron cubanus Rothschild & Jordan, 1906 (Cuba)
- Xylophanes chiron lucianus Rothschild & Jordan, 1906 (Dominica)
- Xylophanes chiron nechus (Cramer, 1777) (Brazil)
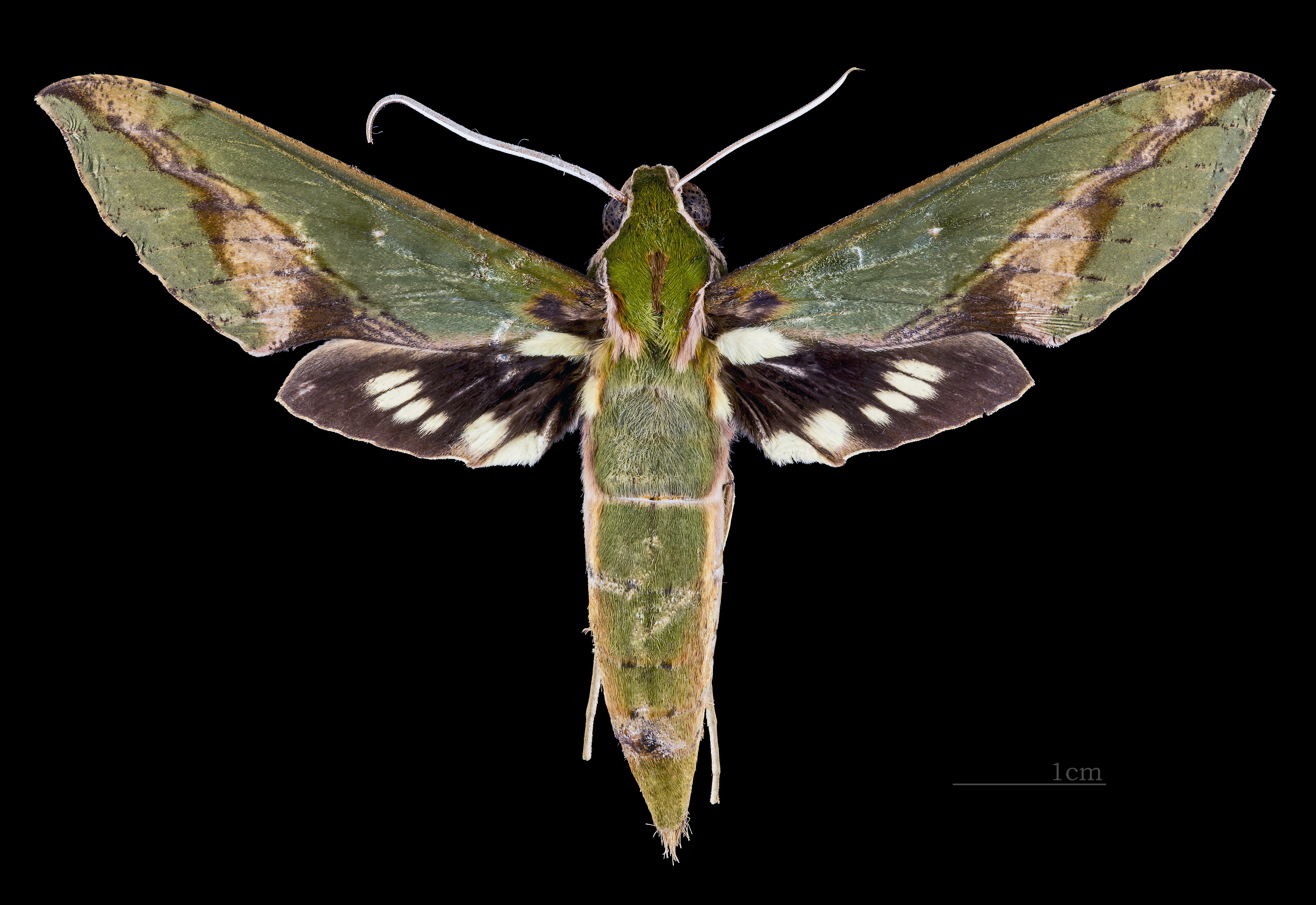
Female Xylophanes chiron nechus

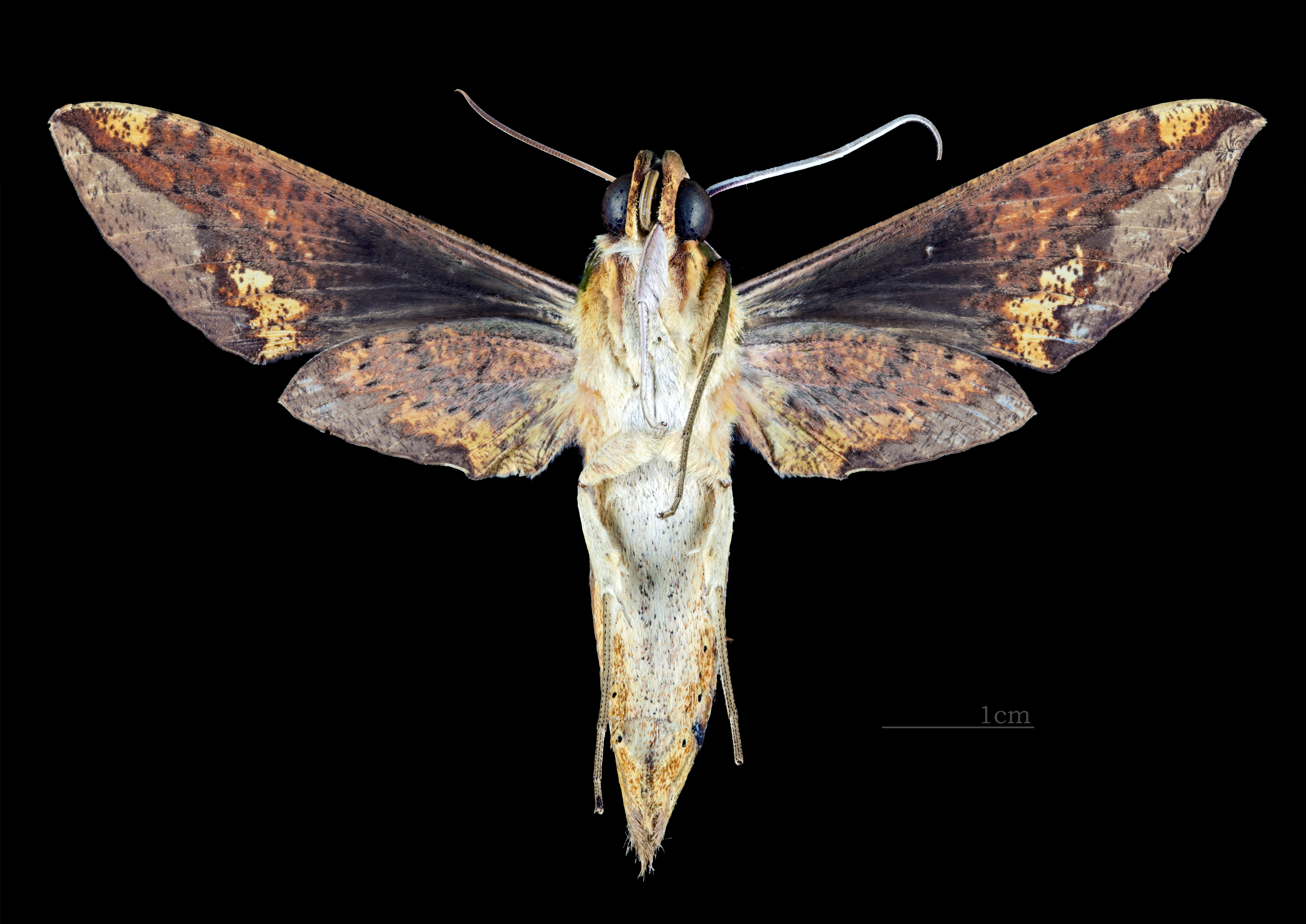
Female underside Xylophanes chiron nechus

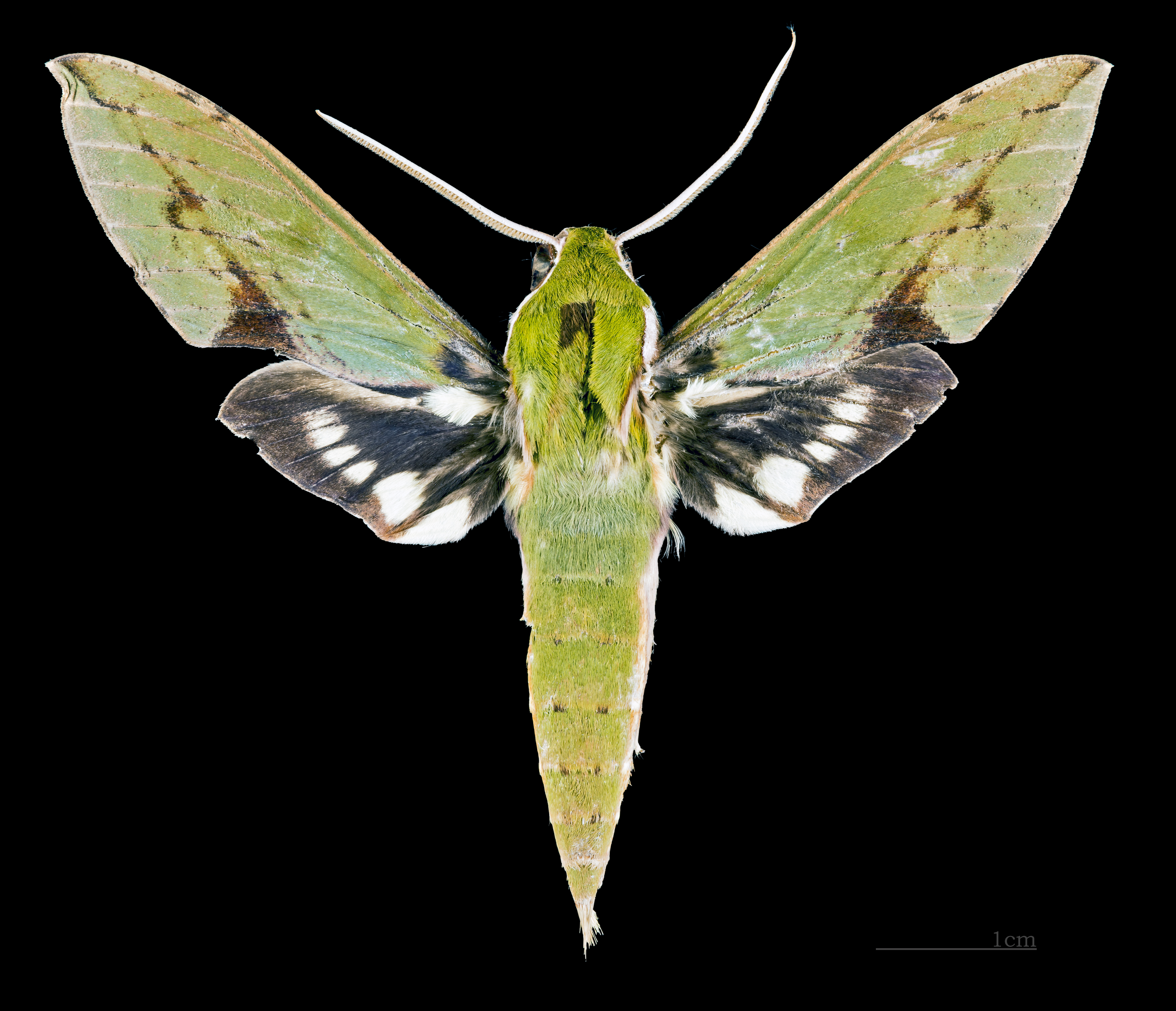
Male Xylophanes chiron nechus

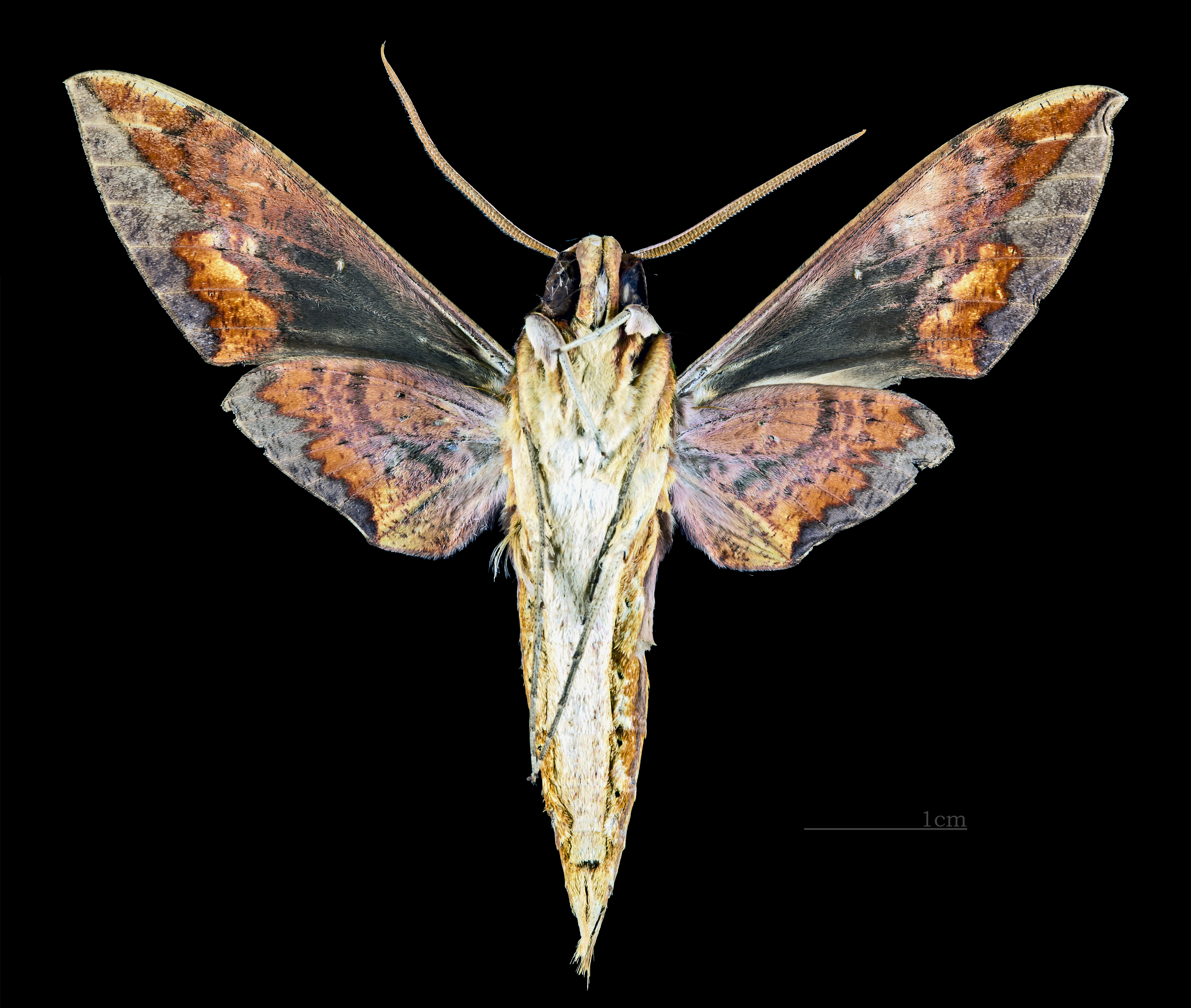
Male underside Xylophanes chiron nechus
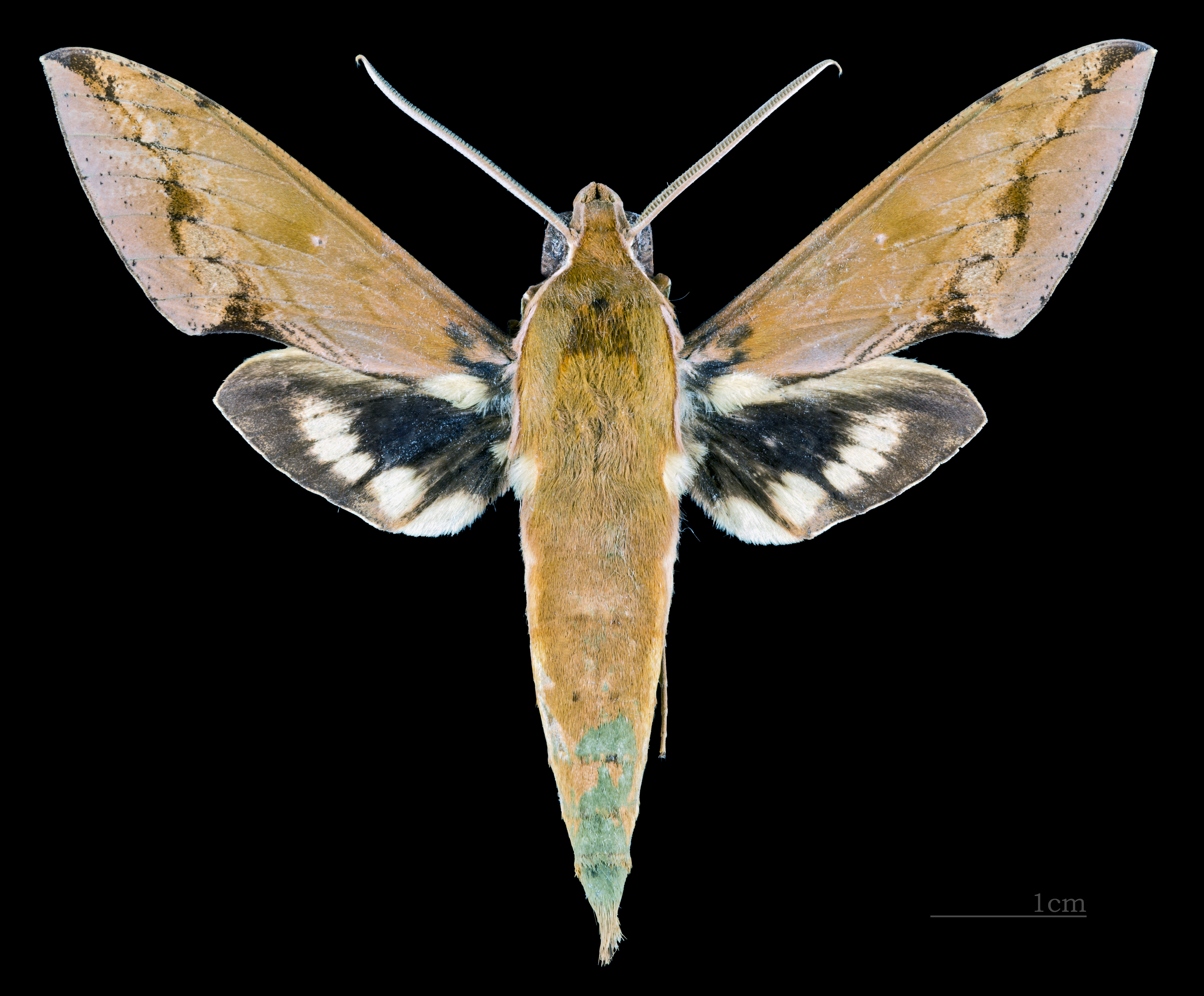
Female Xylophanes chiron lucianus

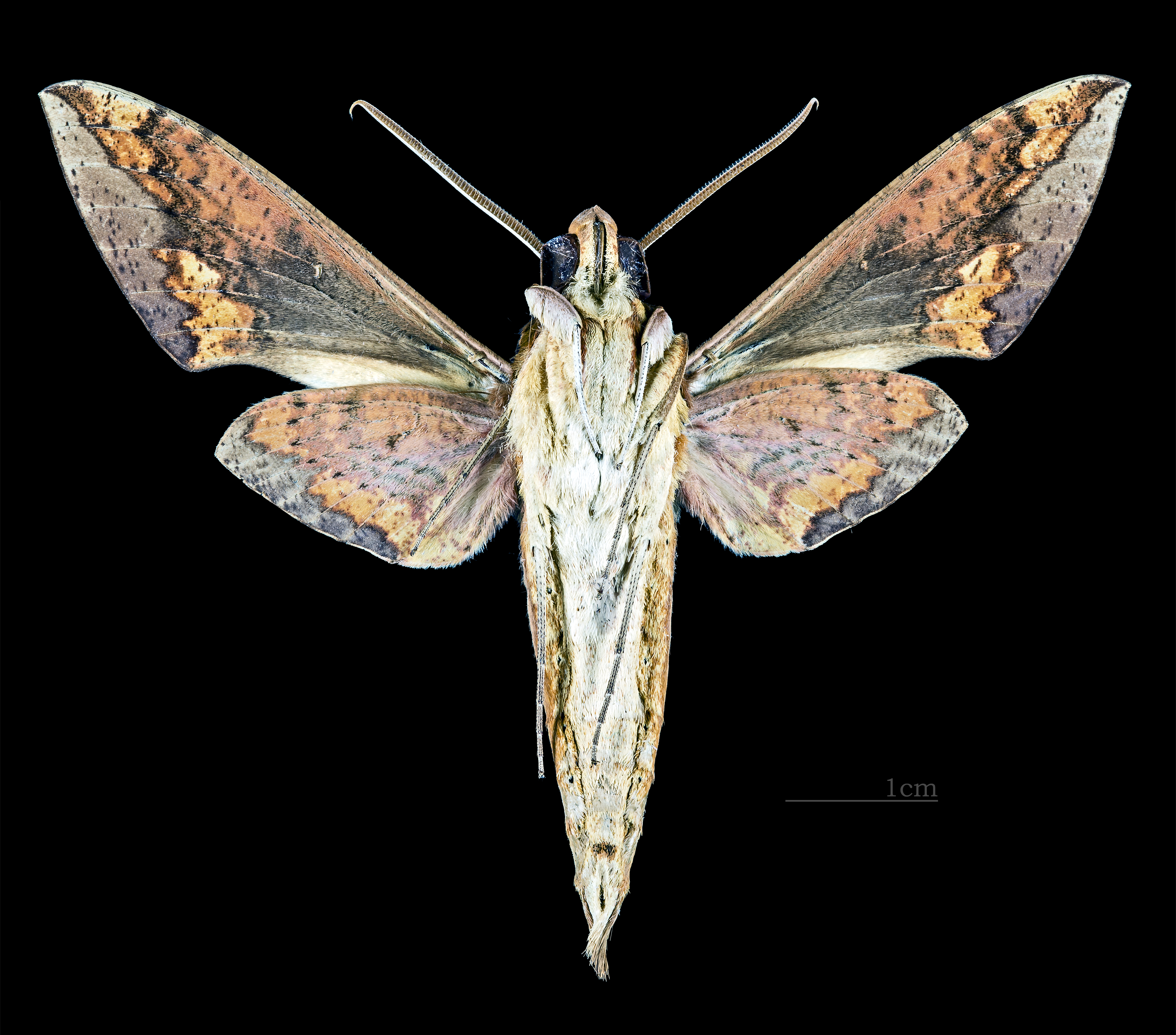
Female underside Xylophanes chiron lucianus

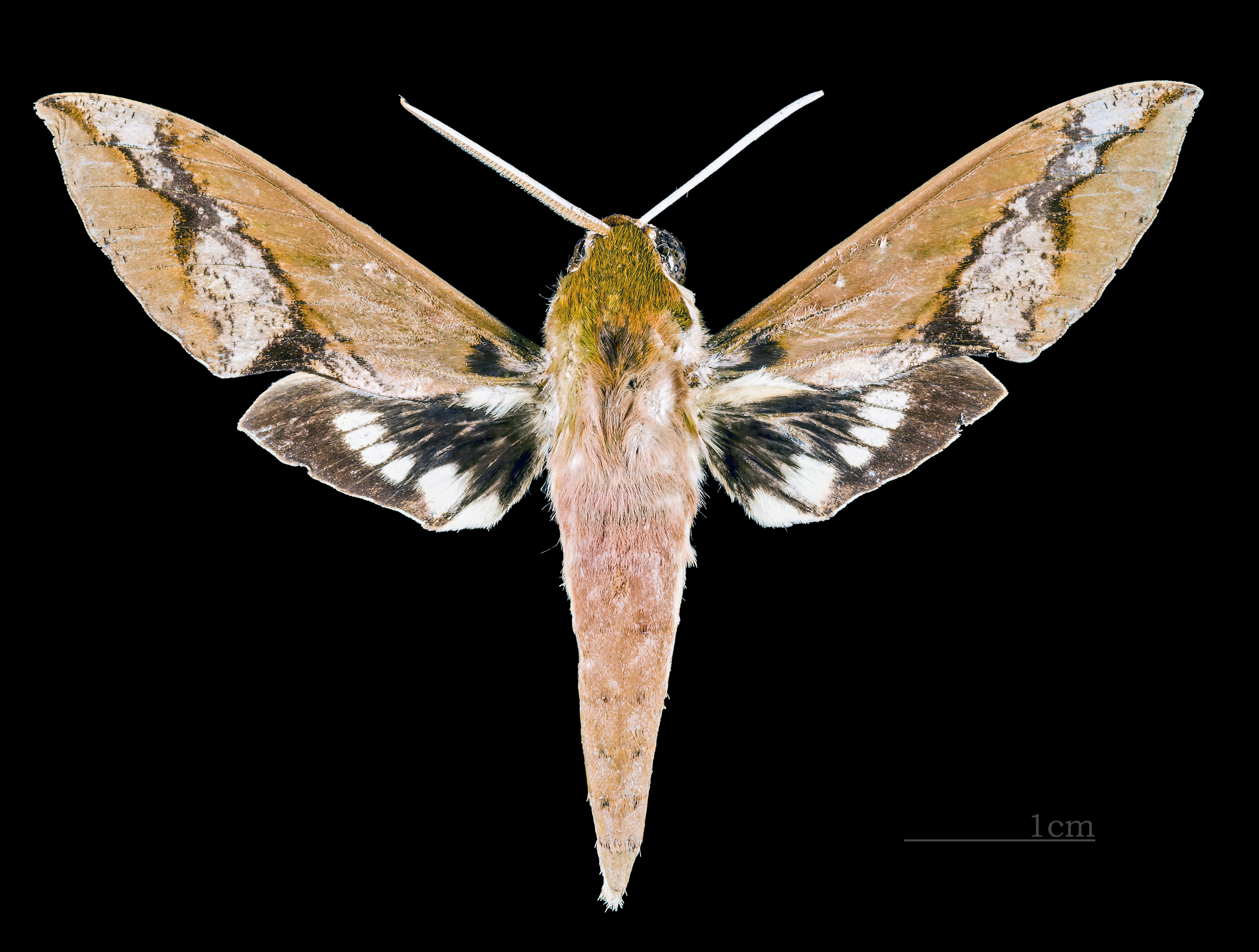
Male Xylophanes chiron cubanus

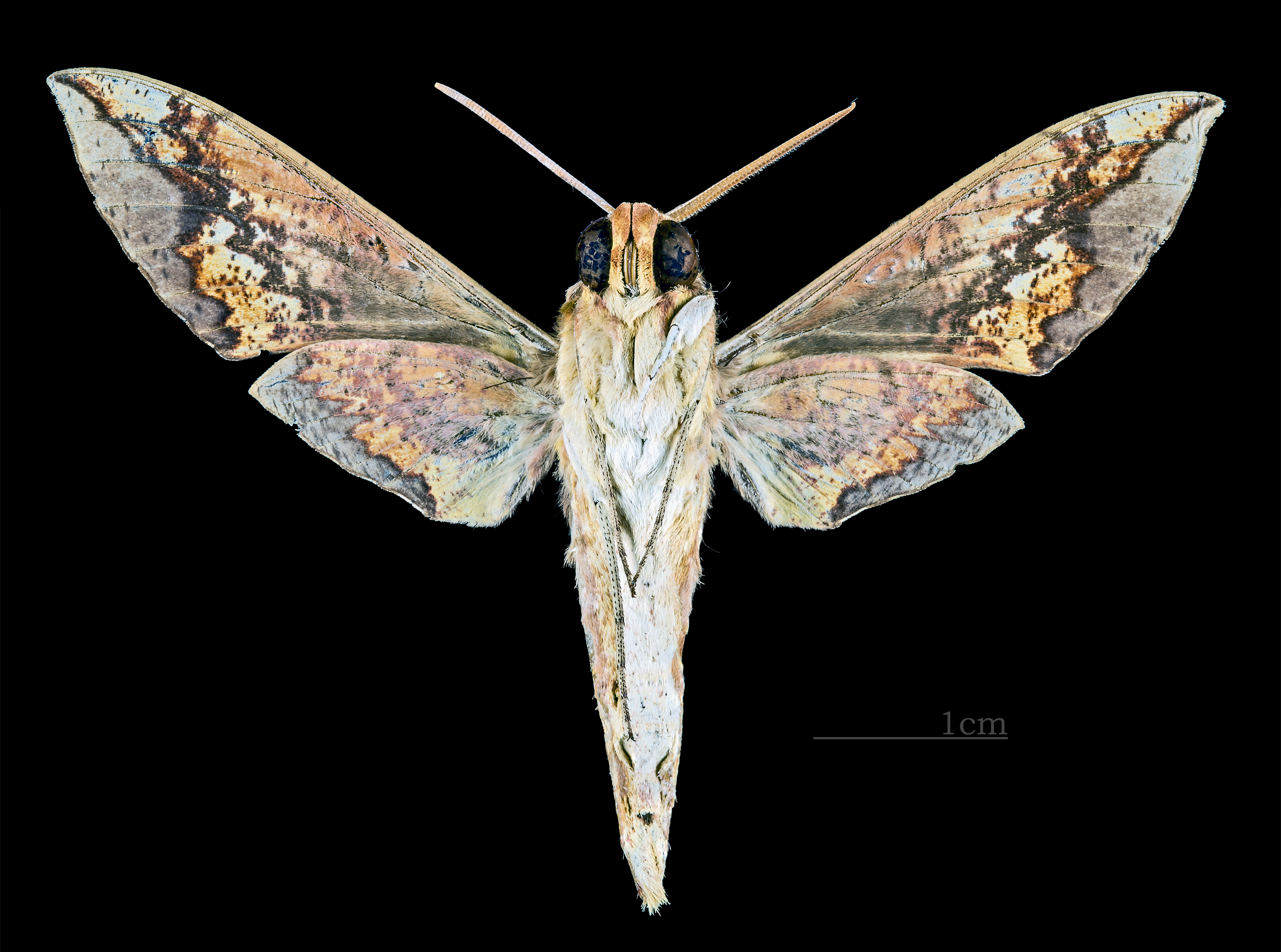
Male underside Xylophanes chiron cubanus
