= Pheia daphaena =

Scientific classification
- Kingdom: Animalia
- Phylum: Arthropoda
- Class: Insecta
- Order: Lepidoptera
- Superfamily: Noctuoidea
- Family: Erebidae
- Subfamily: Arctiinae
- Genus: Pheia
- Species: P. daphaena

Binomial name
- Pheia daphaena Hampson, 1898

Species of moth

Pheia daphaena is a moth in the subfamily Arctiinae. It was described by George Hampson in 1898. It is found on Dominica, Santa Lucia, Martinique, Guadeloupe and Saint Martin.
