= Melipotis famelica =

Scientific classification
- Kingdom: Animalia
- Phylum: Arthropoda
- Class: Insecta
- Order: Lepidoptera
- Superfamily: Noctuoidea
- Family: Erebidae
- Genus: Melipotis
- Species: M. famelica

Binomial name
- Melipotis famelica (Guenée, 1852)

Synonyms
- Bolina leucomelana Herrich-Schäffer, 1868; Bolina bivittata Walker, 1858; Bolina striolaris Herrich-Schäffer, 1868

Species of moth

Melipotis famelica is a species of moth in the family Erebidae first described by Achille Guenée in 1852. The species is found from the southern United States (Florida to Texas) to the Caribbean and Paraguay.

The wingspan is about 42 mm.

The larvae feed on Leucaena latisiliqua.
