= Triuncidia eupalusalis =

Scientific classification
- Kingdom: Animalia
- Phylum: Arthropoda
- Class: Insecta
- Order: Lepidoptera
- Family: Crambidae
- Genus: Triuncidia
- Species: T. eupalusalis

Binomial name
- Triuncidia eupalusalis (Walker, 1859)

Synonyms
- Botys eupalusalis Walker, 1859

Species of moth

Triuncidia eupalusalis is a moth in the family Crambidae. It was described by Francis Walker in 1859. It is found in Venezuela.
