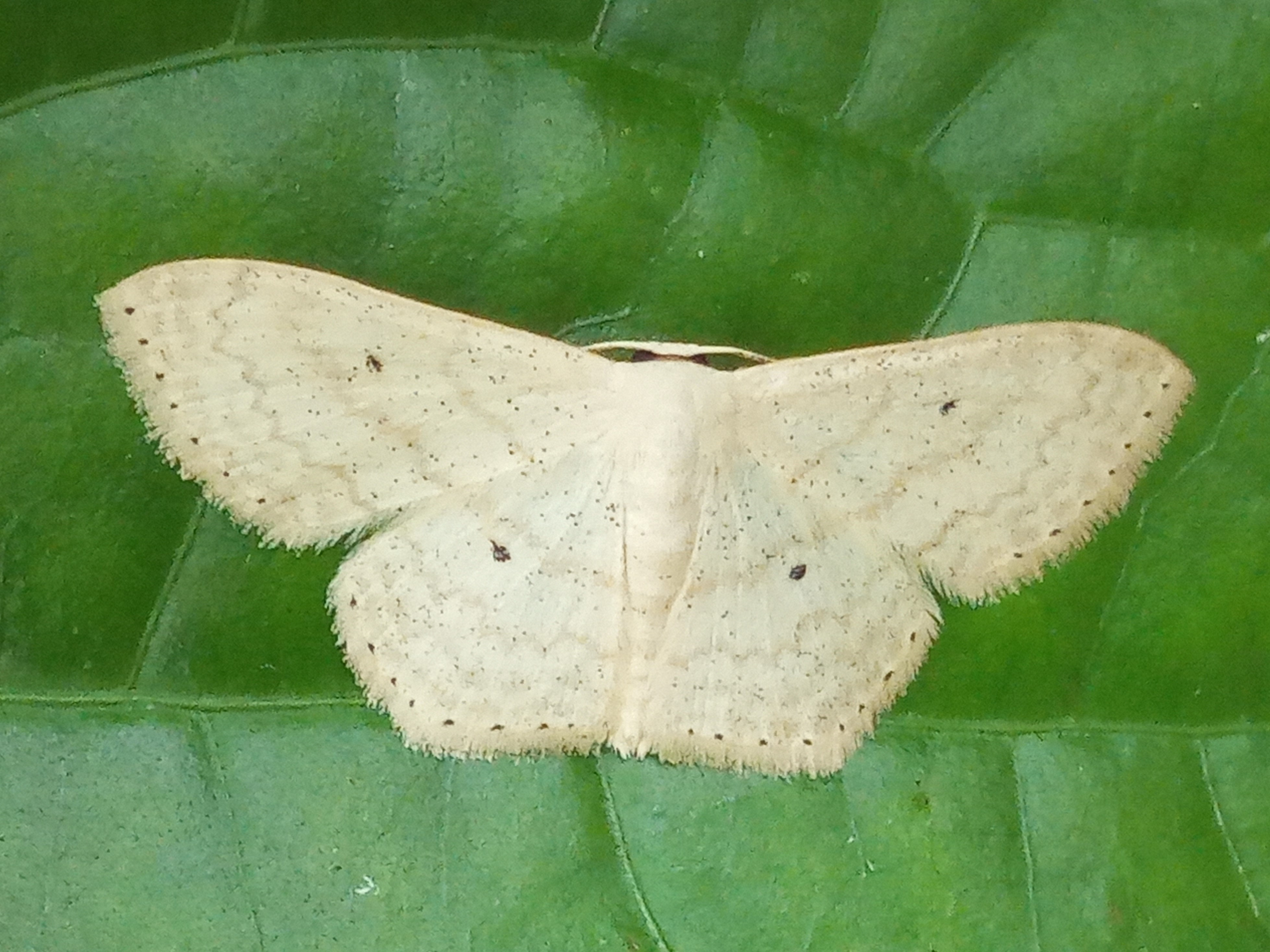

Scientific classification
- Domain: Eukaryota
- Kingdom: Animalia
- Phylum: Arthropoda
- Class: Insecta
- Order: Lepidoptera
- Family: Geometridae
- Genus: Scopula
- Species: S. umbilicata

Binomial name
- Scopula umbilicata (Fabricius, 1794)

Synonyms
- Phalaena umbilicata Fabricius, 1794; Craspedia crenatilinea Warren, 1901; Craspedia cugia Schaus, 1901; Acidalia indoctaria Walker, 1861; Acidalia nigroapicata Thierry-Mieg, 1892; Scopula umbilicata peruviana Prout, 1922

= Scopula umbilicata =

Species of geometer moth in subfamily Sterrhinae

Scopula umbilicata, the swag-lined wave moth, is a species of moth in the family Geometridae. The species was first described by Johan Christian Fabricius in 1794. It is found from the southern part of the United States (including Arizona, Florida, Georgia, Oklahoma and Texas) to South America and the West Indies (including Puerto Rico).

The wingspan is about 18 mm. The wings are white with sparse speckling.
