= Eupithecia carribeana =

Scientific classification
- Domain: Eukaryota
- Kingdom: Animalia
- Phylum: Arthropoda
- Class: Insecta
- Order: Lepidoptera
- Family: Geometridae
- Genus: Eupithecia
- Species: E. carribeana

Binomial name
- Eupithecia carribeana Herbulot, 1986

Species of moth

Eupithecia carribeana is a moth in the family Geometridae. It is found in Guadeloupe and Martinique.
