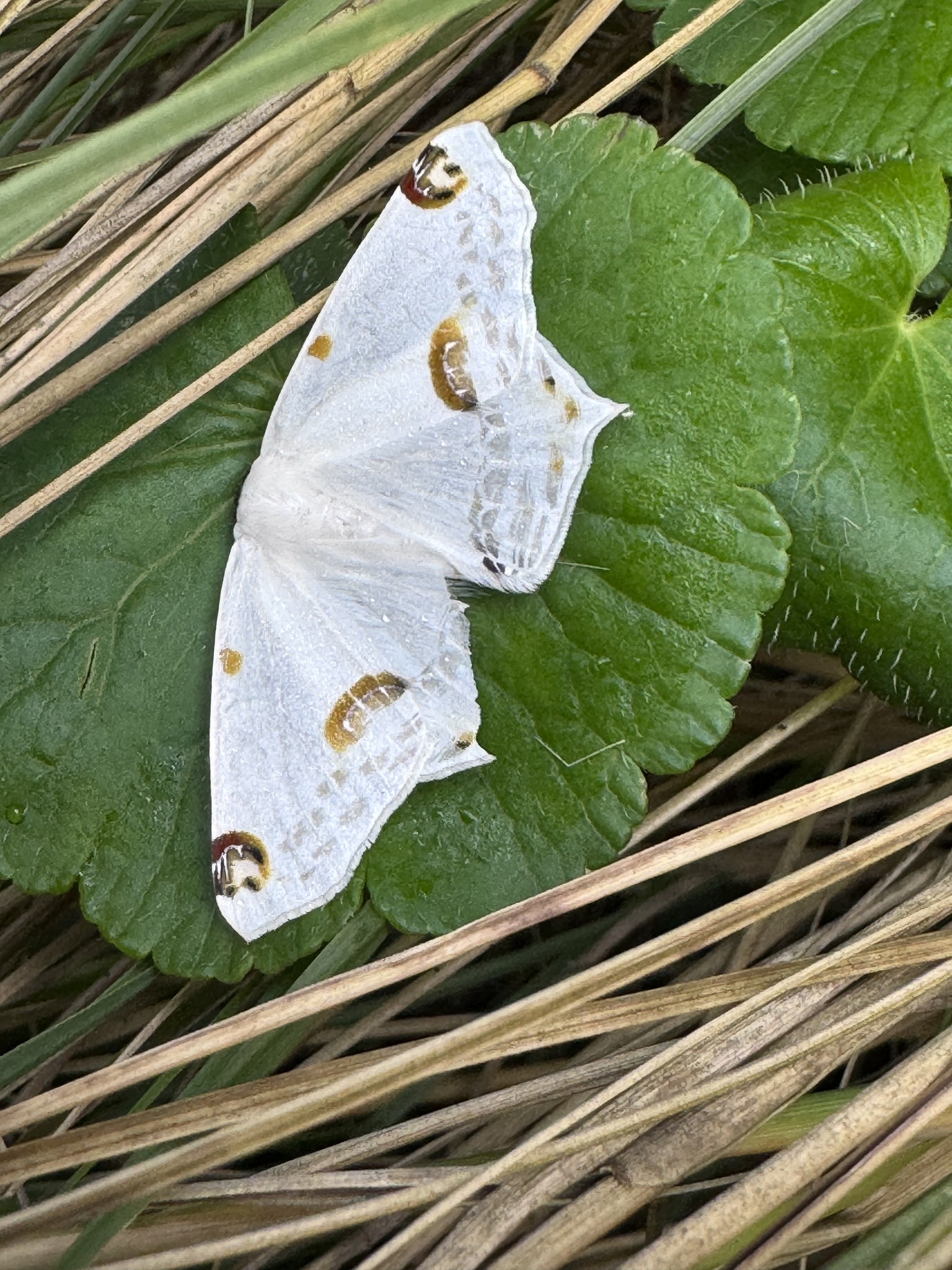

Scientific classification
- Kingdom: Animalia
- Phylum: Arthropoda
- Class: Insecta
- Order: Lepidoptera
- Family: Geometridae
- Genus: Sericoptera
- Species: S. mahometaria

Binomial name
- Sericoptera mahometaria (Herrich-Schäffer, 1853)

= Sericoptera mahometaria =

Species of moth

Sericoptera mahometaria is a species of moth from the genus Sericoptera. The species was originally described by G. A. W. Herrich-Schäffer in 1853.

== Distribution ==
Sericoptera mahometaria has been observed in Central and South America.
