= Eois tegularia =

Scientific classification
- Kingdom: Animalia
- Phylum: Arthropoda
- Clade: Pancrustacea
- Class: Insecta
- Order: Lepidoptera
- Family: Geometridae
- Genus: Eois
- Species: E. tegularia

Binomial name
- Eois tegularia (Guenee, 1858)

Synonyms
- Cambogia tegularia Guenee, 1858; Cambogia lurida Felder & Rogenhofer, 1875

Species of moth

Eois tegularia is a moth in the family Geometridae. It is found in Brazil and in Cuba. It has also been recorded from North America.
