= Epitamyra minusculalis =

Scientific classification
- Domain: Eukaryota
- Kingdom: Animalia
- Phylum: Arthropoda
- Class: Insecta
- Order: Lepidoptera
- Family: Pyralidae
- Genus: Epitamyra
- Species: E. minusculalis

Binomial name
- Epitamyra minusculalis (Möschler, 1890)

Synonyms
- Tamyra minusculalis Möschler, 1890

Species of moth

Epitamyra minusculalis is a species of snout moth in the genus Epitamyra. It was described by Heinrich Benno Möschler in 1890, and is known from Puerto Rico.
