= Eupithecia velutipennis =

Scientific classification
- Domain: Eukaryota
- Kingdom: Animalia
- Phylum: Arthropoda
- Class: Insecta
- Order: Lepidoptera
- Family: Geometridae
- Genus: Eupithecia
- Species: E. velutipennis

Binomial name
- Eupithecia velutipennis Herbulot, 1986

Species of moth

Eupithecia velutipennis is a moth in the family Geometridae first described by Claude Herbulot in 1986. It is found in Guadeloupe, Marie-Galante, Martinique and Montserrat.
