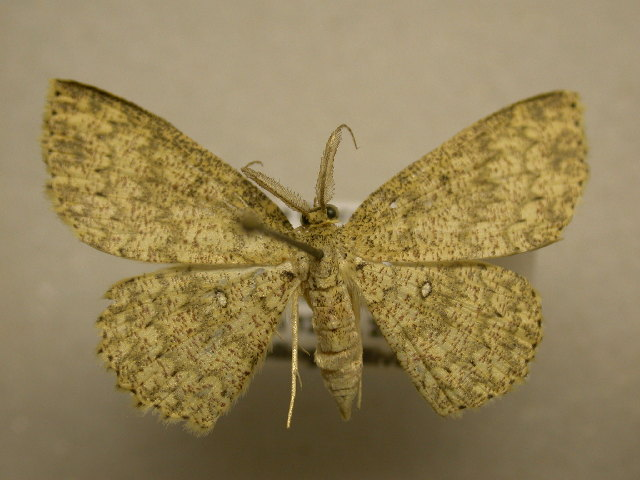

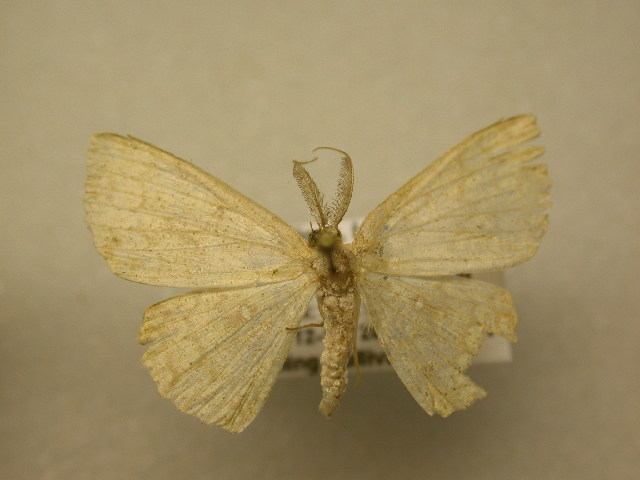

Scientific classification
- Kingdom: Animalia
- Phylum: Arthropoda
- Clade: Pancrustacea
- Class: Insecta
- Order: Lepidoptera
- Family: Geometridae
- Genus: Cyclophora
- Species: C. urcearia

Binomial name
- Cyclophora urcearia (Guenée, 1857)

Synonyms
- Anisodes urcearia Guenée, 1857; Anisodes directata Walker, 1863; Anisodes ordinata Walker, 1863; Anisodes importaria Möschler, 1881; Pryoptera candara Druce, 1892; Asthena sylvia Druce, 1899; Anisodes gueneei Prout, 1938

= Cyclophora urcearia =

Species of moth

Cyclophora urcearia is a moth of the family Geometridae. It is found from Mexico to Paraguay and on Jamaica and in Trinidad.
