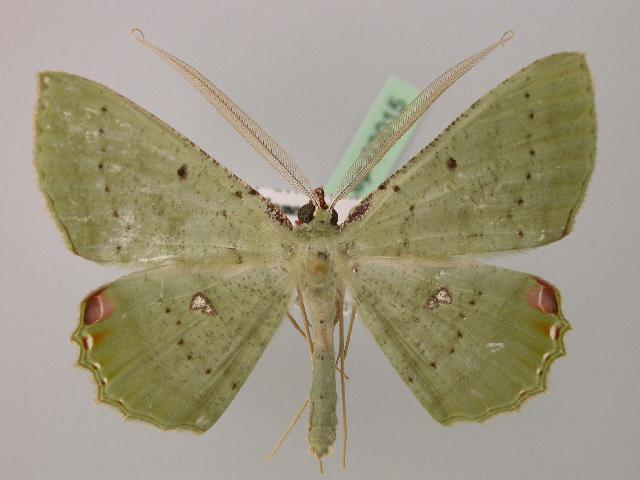

Scientific classification
- Kingdom: Animalia
- Phylum: Arthropoda
- Clade: Pancrustacea
- Class: Insecta
- Order: Lepidoptera
- Family: Geometridae
- Genus: Ametris
- Species: A. nitocris

Binomial name
- Ametris nitocris (Cramer, 1780)

Synonyms
- Phalaena nitocris Cramer, 1780; Ametris nitocritaria Hübner, [1822]; Mecoceras bitactaria Hübner, 1822; Mecoceras peninsularia Grote, 1883; Mecoceras schauseria Edwards, 1884

= Ametris nitocris =

Seagrape spanworm moth

Species of moth

Ametris nitocris, the seagrape spanworm moth, is a moth of the family Geometridae. The species was first described by Pieter Cramer in 1780. It is found from the southern United States (including Florida) through Central America to South America. It is also found on the Antilles.

The wingspan is about 43 mm.

The larvae of the Ametris nitocris are referred to as the greater inchworm in some parts of Florida. These larvae feed on Coccoloba diversifolia.
