= Eupithecia lecerfiata =

Scientific classification
- Domain: Eukaryota
- Kingdom: Animalia
- Phylum: Arthropoda
- Class: Insecta
- Order: Lepidoptera
- Family: Geometridae
- Genus: Eupithecia
- Species: E. lecerfiata

Binomial name
- Eupithecia lecerfiata Herbulot, 1984

Species of moth

Eupithecia lecerfiata is a moth in the family Geometridae. It is found on Nevis.
