= Azeta repugnalis =

Scientific classification
- Kingdom: Animalia
- Phylum: Arthropoda
- Class: Insecta
- Order: Lepidoptera
- Superfamily: Noctuoidea
- Family: Erebidae
- Genus: Azeta
- Species: A. repugnalis

Binomial name
- Azeta repugnalis (Hübner, 1825)

Species of moth

Azeta repugnalis, the repugnant azeta moth, is a species of moth in the family Erebidae.

The MONA or Hodges number for Azeta repugnalis is 8575.
