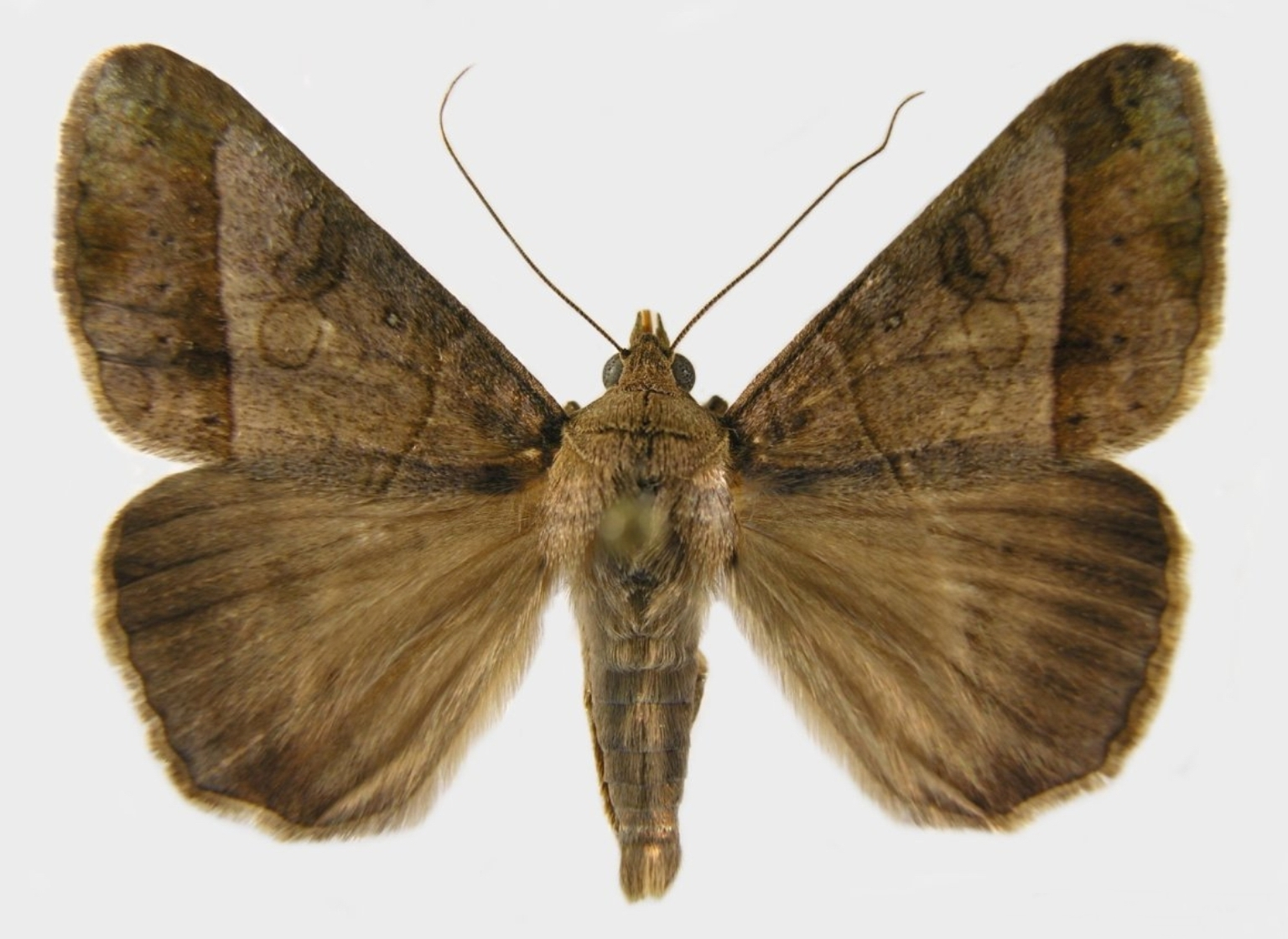

Scientific classification
- Kingdom: Animalia
- Phylum: Arthropoda
- Class: Insecta
- Order: Lepidoptera
- Superfamily: Noctuoidea
- Family: Erebidae
- Genus: Mocis
- Species: M. latipes

Binomial name
- Mocis latipes (Guenée, 1852)

Synonyms
- Remigia latipes Guenée, 1852; Ophiusa delinquens Walker, 1858; Remigia exscindens Walker, 1858; Remigia subtilis Walker, 1858; Remigia collata Walker, 1865; Remigia indentata Harvey, 1875

= Mocis latipes =

Species of moth

Mocis latipes, the small mocis moth or striped grass looper, is a species of moth of the family Erebidae. It is found from North America (from southern Ontario and Quebec to Florida, west to Arizona, north to Minnesota and south through Central to South America.

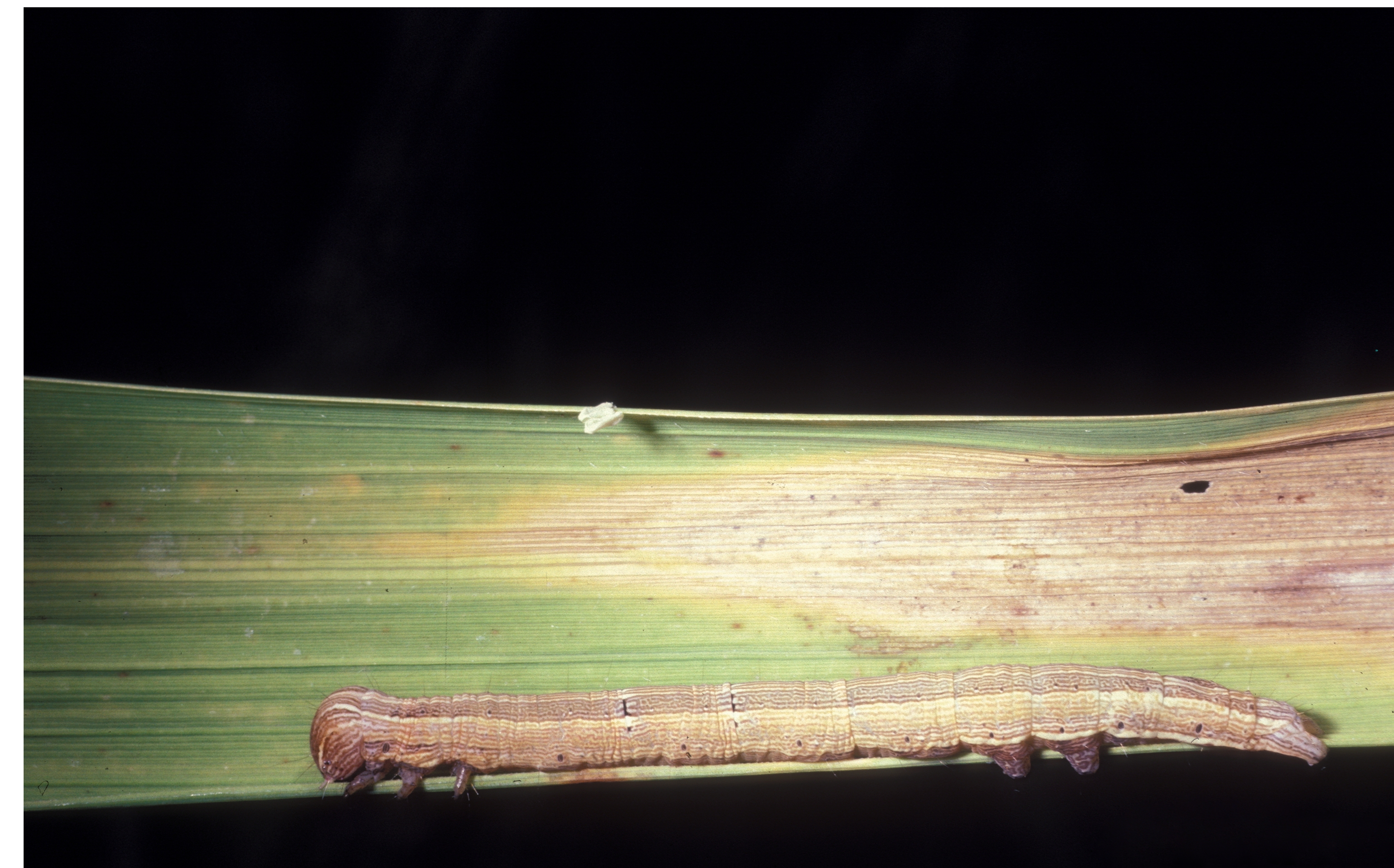
Larva

The wingspan is 33–43 millimetres (1.3–1.7 in). Adults are on wing from June to October.

The larvae feed on various grasses, including rice and corn. They have also been recorded feeding on beans and turnip.
