= Eupithecia comes =

Scientific classification
- Domain: Eukaryota
- Kingdom: Animalia
- Phylum: Arthropoda
- Class: Insecta
- Order: Lepidoptera
- Family: Geometridae
- Genus: Eupithecia
- Species: E. comes

Binomial name
- Eupithecia comes Herbulot, 1986

Species of moth

Eupithecia comes is a moth in the family Geometridae first described by Claude Herbulot in 1986. It is found in Guadeloupe and Saint Kitts.
