= Rhamnocampa =

Scientific classification
- Domain: Eukaryota
- Kingdom: Animalia
- Phylum: Arthropoda
- Class: Insecta
- Order: Lepidoptera
- Superfamily: Noctuoidea
- Family: Erebidae
- Subfamily: Calpinae
- Genus: Rhamnocampa; Franclemont, 1949
- Species: R. albistriga

Binomial name
- Rhamnocampa albistriga (Schaus, 1914)

Synonyms
- Herminodes albistriga Schaus, 1914

Genus of moths

Rhamnocampa is a monotypic moth genus of the family Erebidae erected by John G. Franclemont in 1949. Its only species, Rhamnocampa albistriga, was first described by William Schaus in 1914. It is found in French Guiana.
