= Syllepte pactolalis =

Scientific classification
- Kingdom: Animalia
- Phylum: Arthropoda
- Class: Insecta
- Order: Lepidoptera
- Family: Crambidae
- Genus: Syllepte
- Species: S. pactolalis

Binomial name
- Syllepte pactolalis (Guenée, 1854)

Synonyms
- Botys pactolalis Guenée, 1854; Botys quirinalis Walker, 1859

Species of moth

Syllepte pactolalis is a moth in the family Crambidae. It was described by Achille Guenée in 1854. It is found on Guadeloupe and Rio de Janeiro, Brazil.
