= List of butterflies of Chile =

Location of Chile

This is a list of butterflies of Chile. About 200 species are known from Chile.

== Hesperiidae ==
=== Pyrginae ===
- Urbanus dorantes dorantes
- Urbanus proteus proteus
- Polytrix octomaculatus octumaculatus
- Chirgus barrosi
- Chirgus bochoris trisignatus
- Chirgus fides
- Chirgus limbata limbata
- Burnsius communis chloe
- Burnsius notatus notatus
- Burnsius notatus valdivianus
- Burnsius orcus
- Heliopyrgus americanus americanus
- Erynnis funeralis

=== Hesperiinae ===
- Butleria flavomaculata flavomaculata
- Butleria flavomaculata valdiviana
- Butleria flavomaculata tristriata
- Butleria paniscoides paniscoides
- Butleria paniscoides polyspila
- Butleria elwesi
- Butleria quilla
- Butleria fruticolens
- Butleria sotoi
- Butleria philippi
- Butleria bisexguttata
- Argopteron aureipennis
- Argopteron aureum
- Argopteron puelmae
- Hylephila ancora
- Hylephila boulleti boulleti
- Hylephila fasciolata
- Hylephila isonira mima
- Hylephila phyleus bisistrigata
- Hylephila signata
- Hylephila venusta venusta
- Hylephila venusta haywardi
- Lerodea gracia
- Lerodea eufala
- Quinta canae
- Calpodes ethlius
- Nyctelius nyctelius nyctelius

== Pieridae ==
=== Coliadinae ===
- Colias flaveola flaveola
- Colias flaveola mendozina
- Colias flaveola blameyi
- Colias flaveola weberbaueri
- Colias lesbia lesbia
- Colias vauthierii vauthierii
- Colias vauthierii cuninghami
- Zerene caesonia caesonides
- Phoebis sennae amphitrite
- Terias deva chilensis
- Teriocolias zelia kuscheli

=== Pierinae ===
- Eroessa chilensis
- Mathania leucothea
- Pieris brassicae
- Tatochila distincta fieldi
- Tatochila mariae
- Tatochila inversa razmilici
- Tatochila autodice blanchardi
- Tatochila authodice ernestae
- Tatochila mercedis mercedis
- Tatochila mercedis sterodice
- Tatochila mercedis macrodice
- Tatochila theodice theodice
- Tatochila theodice gymnodice
- Hypsochila galactodice
- Hypsochila huemul
- Hypsochila penai
- Hypsochila argyrodice
- Hypsochila wagenknechti wagenknechti
- Hypsochila wagenknechti sulfurodice
- Hypsochila microdice
- Phulia nymphula nymphula
- Pierphulia rosea rosea
- Pierphulia rosea maria
- Pierphulia isabella
- Infraphulia ilyodes

== Papilionidae ==
- Battus polydamas archidamas

== Lycaenidae ==
=== Theclinae ===
- Strymon eurytulus
- Strymon davara joannisi
- Strymon sapota
- Strymon crambusa
- Strymon peristictos
- Strymon daraba
- Ministrymon azia
- Chlorostrymon kuscheli
- Chlorostrymon larancagua
- Chlorostrymon chileana
- Tergissima shargeli
- Calycopis valparaiso
- Eiseliana flavaria
- Eiseliana rojasi
- Eiseliana bicolor
- Eiseliana probabila
- Heoda wagenknechti
- Heoda suprema
- Heoda shapiroi
- Heoda atacama
- Heoda nivea
- Heoda erani
- Abloxurina muela putreensis
- Pontirama coquimbiensis
- Rhamma chilensis
- Shapiroana herrerai
- Rekoa palegon cyrriana
- Penaincisalia oribata
- Penaincisalia patagonaevaga

=== Polymmatinae ===
- Itylos titicaca
- Hemiargus ramon
- Nabokovia faga
- Nabokovia ada
- Leptotes trigemmatus
- Pseudolucia collina
- Pseudolucia beyamini
- Pseudolucia Iyrnessa
- Pseudolucia hazeorum
- Pseudolucia clarea
- Pseudolucia plumbea
- Pseudolucia annamaria
- Pseudolucia scintilla
- Pseudolucia vera
- Pseudolucia chilensis
- Pseudolucia lanin
- Pseudolucia andina
- Pseudolucia avishai
- Pseudolucia sibylla
- Pseudolucia penai
- Pseudolucia aureliana
- Pseudolucia oligocyanea
- Pseudolucia argentina
- Madeleinea ludrica
- Madeleinea pelorias
- Madeleinea sigal

== Nymphalidae ==
=== Danainae ===
- Danaus erippus

=== Satyrinae ===
- Argyrophorus argenteus argenteus
- Argyrophorus argenteus argenteus
- Argyrophorus argenteus barrosi
- Argyrophorus monticolens
- Argyrophorus williamsianus
- Argyrophorus penai
- Argyrophorus gustavi
- Cosmosatyrus chiliensis chiliensis
- Cosmosatyrus chiliensis wygnanskii
- Cosmosatyrus chiliensis magellanicus
- Cosmosatyrus chiliensis elwesi
- Cosmosatyrus leptoneuroides leptoneuroides
- Cosmosatyrus leptoneuroides plumbeola
- Faunula leocognele leucognele
- Faunula leocognele eleates
- Faunula patagonica
- Tetraphlebia germaini
- Tetraphlebia stelligera
- Neosatyrus ambiorix
- Homoeonympha vesagus
- Homoeonympha boisduvali boisduvali
- Homoeonympha boisduvali pusila
- Homoeonympha humilis
- Neomaenas coenonymphina
- Neomaenas edmondsii
- Neomaenas fractifascia
- Neomaenas inornata
- Neomaenas janiriodes
- Neomaenas monachus
- Neomaenas poliozona
- Neomaenas servilia
- Neomaenas simplex
- Neomaenas wallengreni
- Pamperis poaoenis
- Auca coctei
- Auca coctei nycteropus
- Auca delessei
- Auca pales
- Spinanthenna tristis
- Elina montroli
- Elina vanessoides
- Nelia calverti
- Nelia nemyroides

=== Heliconiinae ===
- Dione glycera
- Agraulis vanillae
- Yramea cytheris
- Yramea lathonoides
- Yramea modesta
- Euptoieta claudia hortensia

=== Nymphalinae ===
- Junonia vestina livia
- Vanessa carye
- Vanessa terpsichore

=== Libytheinae ===
- Libythea carinenta carinenta

== See also ==
- List of butterflies of the Amazon River basin and the Andes
