= List of Lepidoptera of the Dutch Caribbean =

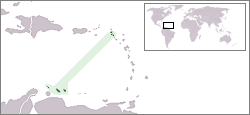
Location of the former Netherlands Antilles

This list of Lepidoptera of the Dutch Caribbean includes the butterflies and moths that have been recorded from the Dutch Caribbean, consisting of the islands of Aruba, Sint Maarten, Curaçao, Bonaire, Saba and Sint Eustatius.

According to a recent estimate, there are 110 Lepidoptera species in the Dutch Caribbean.

== Butterflies ==
=== Hesperiidae ===
- Atalopedes clarkei Burns, 1989
- Atalopedes flaveola (Mabille, 1891)
- Calpodes ethlius (Stoll, 1782)
- Chioides catillus (Cramer, 1779)
- Chiomara asychis (Reakirt, 1868)
- Cymaenes tripunctus (Herrich-Schäffer, 1865)
  - Cymaenes tripunctus theogenis (Capronnier, 1874)
- Ephyriades arcas (Drury, 1773)
- Epargyreus zestos (Geyer, 1832)
- Gesta gesta (Butler & H. Druce, 1872)
- Heliopetes domicella (Erichson, 1848)
- Hylephila phyleus (Drury, [1773])
- Lerodea eufala (Edwards, 1869)
- Panoquina panoquinoides (Skinner, 1891)
- Panoquina sylvicola (Herrich-Schäffer, 1865)
- Polygonus leo (Gmelin, [1790])
- Polygonus savigny (Latreille, [1824])
- Polythrix octomaculata (Sepp, [1844])
- Pyrgus adepta (Plötz, 1884)
- Pyrgus oileus (Linnaeus, 1767)
- Pyrrhopygopsis socrates (Ménétriés, 1885)
  - Pyrrhopygopsis socrates orasus (H. Druce, 1876)
- Urbanus dorantes (Stoll, 1790)
- Urbanus obscurus (Hewitson, 1867)
- Urbanus proteus (Linnaeus, 1758)
- Wallengrenia ophites (Mabille, 1878)
- Zopyrion satyrina (Felder & Felder, 1867)

=== Lycaenidae ===
- Brephidium exilis (Boisduval, 1852)
- Chlorostrymon maesites (Herrich-Schäffer, 1864)
- Chlorostrymon simaethis (Drury, 1770)
- Chlorostrymon telea (Hewitson, 1868)
- Cyclargus huntingtoni (Rindge & Comstock, 1953)
- Cyclargus thomasi (Clench, 1941)
- Electrostrymon angerona (Godman & Salvin, 1896)
- Electrostrymon joya (Dognin, 1895)
- Hemiargus hanno (Stoll, [1790])
- Hemiargus woodruffi (Comstock & Huntington, 1943)
- Leptotes cassius (Cramer, 1775)
- Ministrymon azia (Edwards, 1882)
- Ministrymon janevicroy Glassberg, 2013
- Ministrymon ligia (W.C. Hewitson, 1877)
- Rekoa marius (Lucas, 1857)
- Strymon acis (Drury, 1773)
- Strymon bubastus (Stoll, 1780)
- Strymon columella (Fabricius, 1793)
- Strymon megarus (Godart, [1824])
- Theope virgilius (Fabricius, 1793)

=== Nymphalidae ===
- Agraulis vanillae (Linnaeus, 1758)
- Anartia jatrophae (Johansson, 1763)
- Biblis hyperia (Cramer, 1782)
- Chlosyne saundersii (Doubleday &. Hewitson)
- Danaus eresimus (Cramer, 1777)
- Danaus plexippus (Linnaeus, 1758)
  - Danaus plexippus megalippe
- Dryas iulia alcionea (Cramer, 1779)
- Dynamine postverta (Cramer, [1780])
- Eunica monima (Stoll, 1782)
- Hamadryas feronia (Linnaeus, 1758)
- Heliconius erato (Linnaeus, 1758)
- Heliconius erato hydara Hewitson, 1867
- Heliconius charitonia (Linnaeus, 1767)
- Historis acheronta (Fabricius, 1775)
- Hypolimnas misippus (Linnaeus, 1764)
- Junonia evarete (Cramer, 1782)
  - Junonia evarete zonalis (C. Felder & R. Felder, [1867])
- Marpesia petreus (Cramer, 1776)
- Mechanitis polymnia (Linnaeus, 1758)
  - Mechanitis polymnia doryssus (Bates, 1863)
- Vanessa cardui (Linnaeus, 1758)

=== Papilionidae ===
- Battus polydamas (Linnaeus, 1758)

=== Pieridae ===
- Anteos maerulea (Fabricius, 1775)
- Aphrissa statira (Cramer, 1777)
- Appias drusilla (Cramer, 1777)
- Ascia monuste (Linnaeus, 1764)
- Eurema elathea (Cramer, [1777])
- Eurema leuce (Boisduval, 1836)
- Eurema lisa euterpe (Ménétries 1832)
- Eurema gratiosa (Doubleday, 1847)
- Eurema proterpia (Fabricius, 1775)
- Ganyra tiburtia (Fruhstorfer, 1907)
- Kricogonia lyside (Godart, 1819)
- Phoebis agarithe (Boisduval, 1836)
- Phoebis argante (Fabricius, 1775)
- Phoebis sennae (Linnaeus, 1758)
- Rhabdodryas trite (Linnaeus, 1758)
- Zerene cesonia (Stoll, 1790)

== Moths ==
=== Arctiidae ===
- Chetone angulosa (Walker, 1854)
- Utetheisa ornatrix (Linnaeus, 1758)

=== Geometridae ===
- Epimecis matronaria (Guenée, [1858])
- Melanchroia chephise (Stoll, 1782)

=== Noctuidae ===
- Ascalapha odorata (Linnaeus, 1758)
- Thysania zenobia (Cramer, 1777)

=== Saturnidae ===
- Automeris amoena (Walker, 1865)

=== Sphingidae ===
- Aellopos clavipes (Rothschild and Jordan, 1903)
- Cocytius antaeus (Drury, 1773)
- Erinnyis ello (Linnaeus, 1758)
- Erinnyis obscura (Fabricius, 1775)
- Eumorpha fasciata (Sulzer, 1776)
- Eumorpha labruscae (Linnaeus, 1758)
- Hyles lineata (Fabricius, 1775)
- Manduca rustica harterti (Fabricius, 1775)
- Manduca sexta (Linnaeus, 1763)
- Pachylia ficus (Linnaeus, 1758)
- Protambulyx strigilis (Linnaeus, 1771)
- Pseudosphinx tetrio (Linnaeus, 1771)

=== Uranidae ===
- Urania leilus (Linnaeus, 1758)
