= Auca =

Auca or AUCA may refer to:

- Auca (titular diocese), the former Catholic bishopric of (Villafranca Montes de) Oca in Spain, now a Latin titular see
- A pejorative name for the native Huaorani people in Ecuador
  - Operation Auca, an endeavor to evangelize the Huaorani tribe
- Auca (genus), a genus of butterflies in the subfamily Satyrinae of the family Nymphalidae
- Auca (cartoon), a Catalan genre of story in pictures
- Sociedad Deportiva Aucas, a football club from Quito, Ecuador

AUCA as an acronym

- Adventist University of Central Africa
- American University of Central Asia
