= Calosoma argentinense =

Scientific classification
- Domain: Eukaryota
- Kingdom: Animalia
- Phylum: Arthropoda
- Class: Insecta
- Order: Coleoptera
- Suborder: Adephaga
- Family: Carabidae
- Subfamily: Carabinae
- Tribe: Carabini
- Genus: Calosoma
- Species: C. argentinense

Binomial name
- Calosoma argentinense Csiki, 1927

Synonyms
- Calosoma belsaki Dallas, 1939; Calosoma cuprifulgens Dallas, 1939; Calosoma dallasi Dallas, 1939; Calosoma miniaturum Dallas, 1939; Calosoma pampeanum Dallas, 1939; Calosoma antiquum Dejean, 1831

Species of beetle

Calosoma argentinense, the Argentine caterpillar hunter, is a species in the beetle family Carabidae. It is found in South America. This species is found in Bolivia, Argentina, Paraguay, Uruguay and Brazil, where it inhabits Chaco forests, dry valleys in the pampas and desert scrub and grassy areas.

Adults are nocturnal and prey on insect larvae, such as the caterpillars Colias lesbia.
