= Nennius (disambiguation) =

Nennius was a Welsh monk of the 9th century traditionally considered to be author of the Historia Brittonum.

Nennius may also refer to:

- Nennius of Britain, mythical prince of Britain at the time of Julius Caesar's invasions of Britain (55–54 BC)
- Saint Nennius, 6th-century Irish abbot known as one of the twelve apostles of Ireland
- Nennius, a synonym for Polygonus, a genus of butterflies
