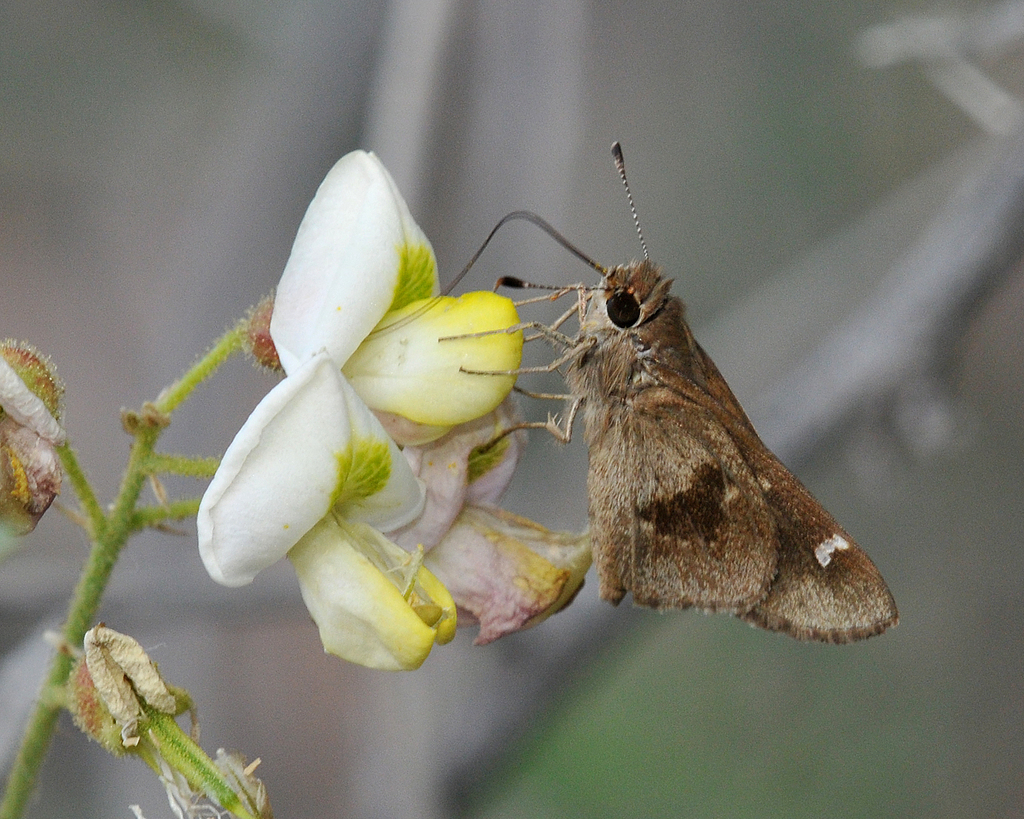

Scientific classification
- Kingdom: Animalia
- Phylum: Arthropoda
- Class: Insecta
- Order: Lepidoptera
- Family: Hesperiidae
- Genus: Lerodea
- Species: L. arabus

Binomial name
- Lerodea arabus (W. H. Edwards, 1882)

Synonyms
- Lerodea dysaules Godman, 1900

= Lerodea arabus =

Species of butterfly

Lerodea arabus, known generally as the violet-clouded skipper or olive-clouded skipper, is a species of grass skipper in the butterfly family Hesperiidae. It is found in Central America and North America.

The MONA or Hodges number for Lerodea arabus is 4112.
