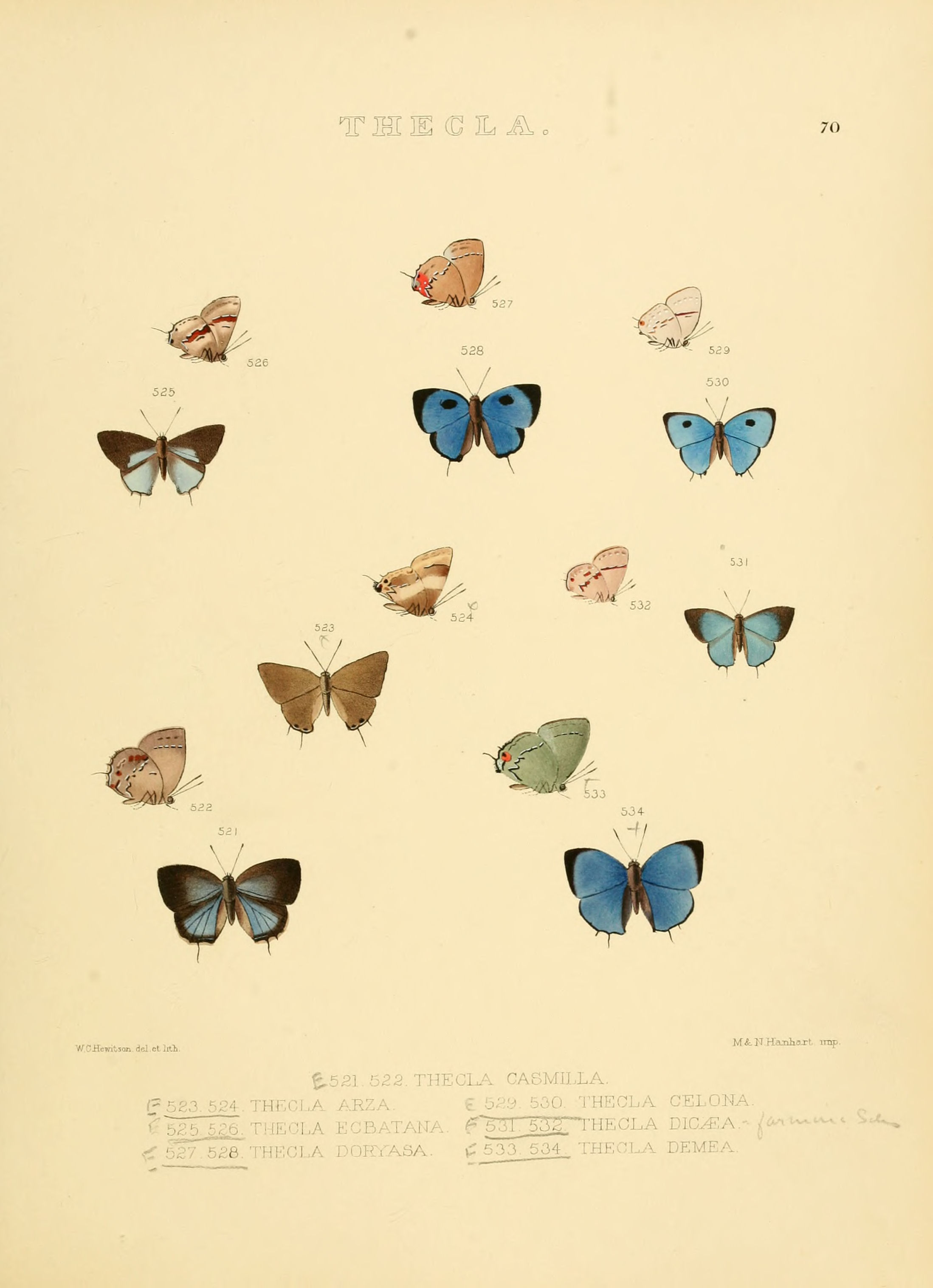
- Electrostrymon ecbatana and other Lycaenidae in William Chapman Hewitson's Illustrations of Diurnal Lepidoptera

Scientific classification
- Kingdom: Animalia
- Phylum: Arthropoda
- Clade: Pancrustacea
- Class: Insecta
- Order: Lepidoptera
- Family: Lycaenidae
- Tribe: Eumaeini
- Genus: Electrostrymon; Clench, 1961

Synonyms
- Angulopis K. Johnson, 1991

= Electrostrymon =

Butterfly genus in family Lycaenidae

Electrostrymon is a genus of Neotropical butterflies in the family Lycaenidae.

== Species ==
The following species are recognized in the genus:

- Electrostrymon angelia (Hewitson, 1874) – fulvous hairstreak, angelic hairstreak
- Electrostrymon angerona (Godman & Salvin, 1896)
- Electrostrymon canus (H. Druce, 1907)
- Electrostrymon constantinoi (Johnson & Kroenlein, 1993)
- Electrostrymon dominicana (Lathy, 1904)
- Electrostrymon denarius (Butler & H. Druce, 1872)
- Electrostrymon ecbatana (Hewitson, 1868)
- Electrostrymon endymion (Fabricius, 1775) – endymion hairstreak
- Electrostrymon hugon (Godart, [1824]) – ruddy hairstreak
- Electrostrymon joya (Dognin, 1895) – muted hairstreak
- Electrostrymon mathewi (Hewitson, 1874)
- Electrostrymon pan (Drury, 1773)
- Electrostrymon perisus (H. Druce, 1907)
- Electrostrymon picoloro Prieto & Robbins, 2015
- Electrostrymon thurman Thompson & Robbins, 2016

Nomen dubium:

- Electrostrymon minikyanos Johnson & Matusik, 1988, per Robbins & Lamas, 2002 (p.206)
