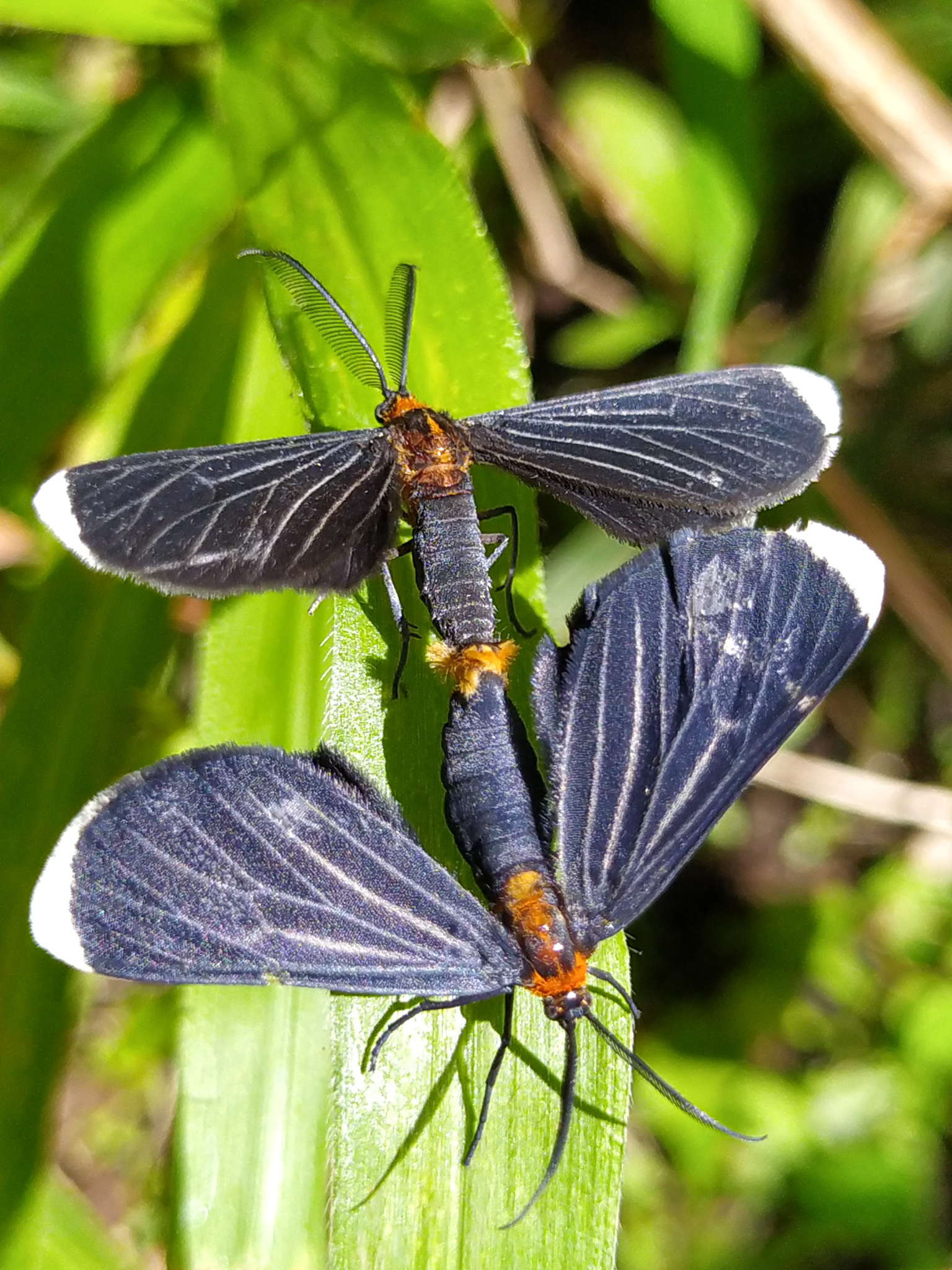

Scientific classification
- Kingdom: Animalia
- Phylum: Arthropoda
- Clade: Pancrustacea
- Class: Insecta
- Order: Lepidoptera
- Family: Geometridae
- Tribe: Boarmiini
- Genus: Melanchroia; Hübner, [1819]

= Melanchroia =

Genus of moths

Melanchroia is a genus of moths in the family of diurnal neotropical moths, Geometridae, and subfamily Ennominae. The genus was proposed by Jacob Hübner in 1819. Its species can be found from the southeastern United States to Argentina.

== Species ==
- Melanchroia aterea
- Melanchroia carbonaria
- Melanchroia chephise
- Melanchroia geometroides
- Melanchroia regnatrix
- Melanchroia tepens
- Melanchroia vazquezae
- Melanchroia venata
