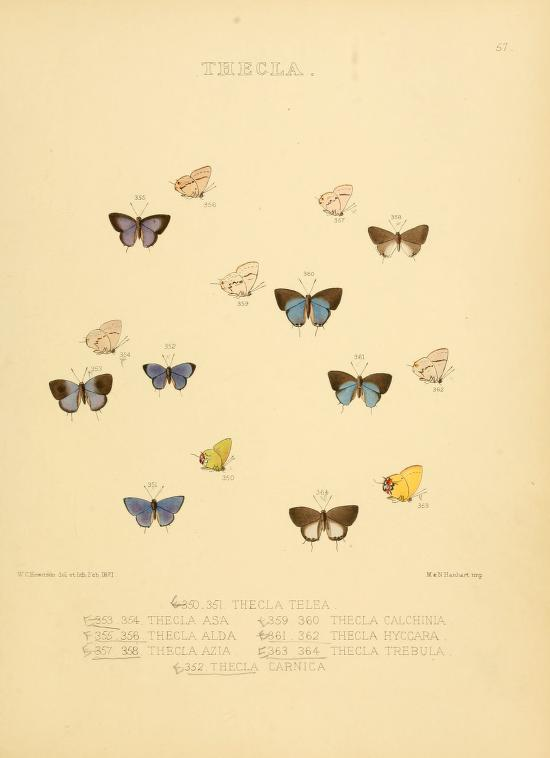
- Chlorostrymon telea, figures 350 and 351

Scientific classification
- Domain: Eukaryota
- Kingdom: Animalia
- Phylum: Arthropoda
- Class: Insecta
- Order: Lepidoptera
- Family: Lycaenidae
- Tribe: Eumaeini
- Genus: Chlorostrymon; Clench, 1961

= Chlorostrymon =

Butterfly genus in family Lycaenidae

Chlorostrymon is a genus of butterflies in the family Lycaenidae. The species of this genus are found in the Nearctic and Neotropical realms.

== Species ==
- Chlorostrymon simaethis (Drury, 1773) – silver-banded hairstreak
- Chlorostrymon telea (Hewitson, 1868) – telea hairstreak
- Chlorostrymon maesites (Herrich-Schäffer, 1864) – amethyst hairstreak
- Chlorostrymon clenchi Comstock & Huntington, 1943 Dominica, Guadeloupe
- Chlorostrymon kuscheli (Ureta, 1949)
- Chlorostrymon orbis Johnson & Smith, 1993 Jamaica
