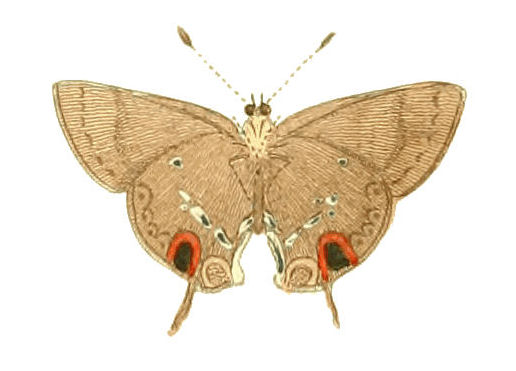
- Ventral view

Scientific classification
- Domain: Eukaryota
- Kingdom: Animalia
- Phylum: Arthropoda
- Class: Insecta
- Order: Lepidoptera
- Family: Lycaenidae
- Genus: Electrostrymon
- Species: E. pan

Binomial name
- Electrostrymon pan (Drury, 1773)

Synonyms
- Papilio pan Drury, 1773; Thecla tirrhaea Möschler, 1886

= Electrostrymon pan =

Species of butterfly

Electrostrymon pan is a butterfly of the family Lycaenidae. It was described by Dru Drury in 1773 from Jamaica.

== Description ==
Upperside: antennae black. Thorax, abdomen, and wings dark brown, or dark hair-coloured; the latter being furnished with two small tails like hairs, the extremities being white.

Underside: palpi white. Breast greyish. Wings nearly the same colour as on the upperside. The posterior having two eyes on each at the abdominal corners; one being black with a red iris, the other grey and faint; above them is a small indented white line, pointing to a spot of the same colour placed at the middle of the anterior edge. Wingspan 1 1/4 inches (32 mm).
