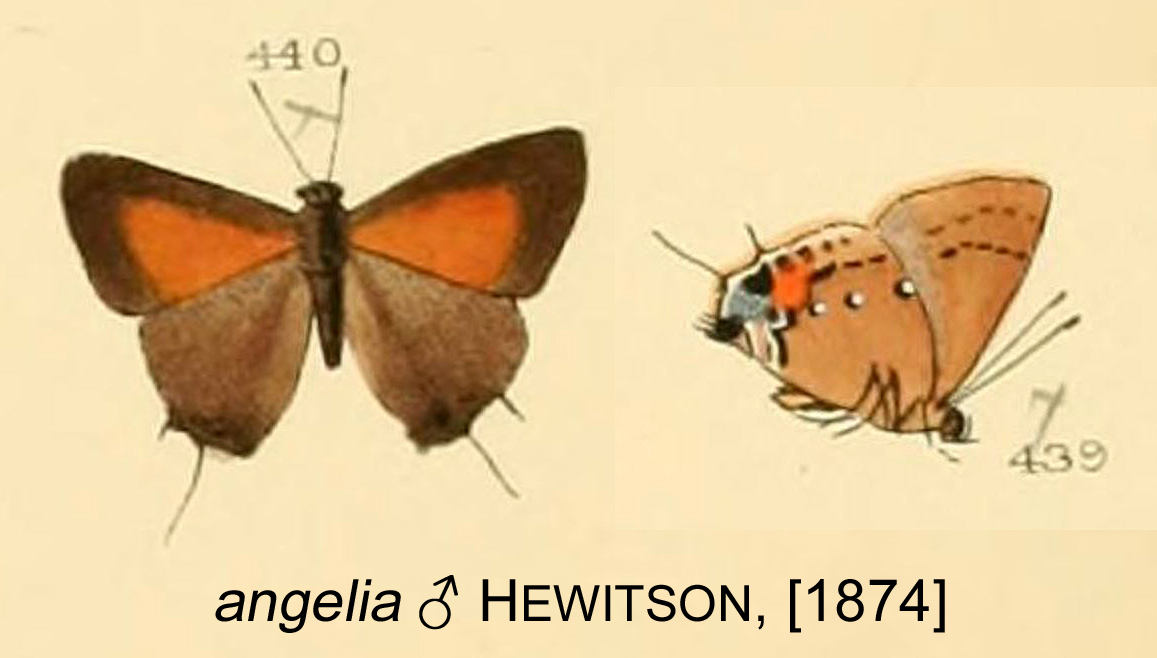

Scientific classification
- Kingdom: Animalia
- Phylum: Arthropoda
- Clade: Pancrustacea
- Class: Insecta
- Order: Lepidoptera
- Family: Lycaenidae
- Tribe: Eumaeini
- Genus: Electrostrymon
- Species: E. angelia

Binomial name
- Electrostrymon angelia (Hewitson, 1874)

= Electrostrymon angelia =

Species of butterfly

Electrostrymon angelia, the fulvous hairstreak, is a species of hairstreak in the butterfly family Lycaenidae. It is found in North America.

== Subspecies ==
These four subspecies belong to the species Electrostrymon angelia:

- Electrostrymon angelia angelia (Hewitson, 1874)
- Electrostrymon angelia boyeri (Comstock & Huntington, 1943)
- Electrostrymon angelia dowi
- Electrostrymon angelia karukera Brévignon, 2000
