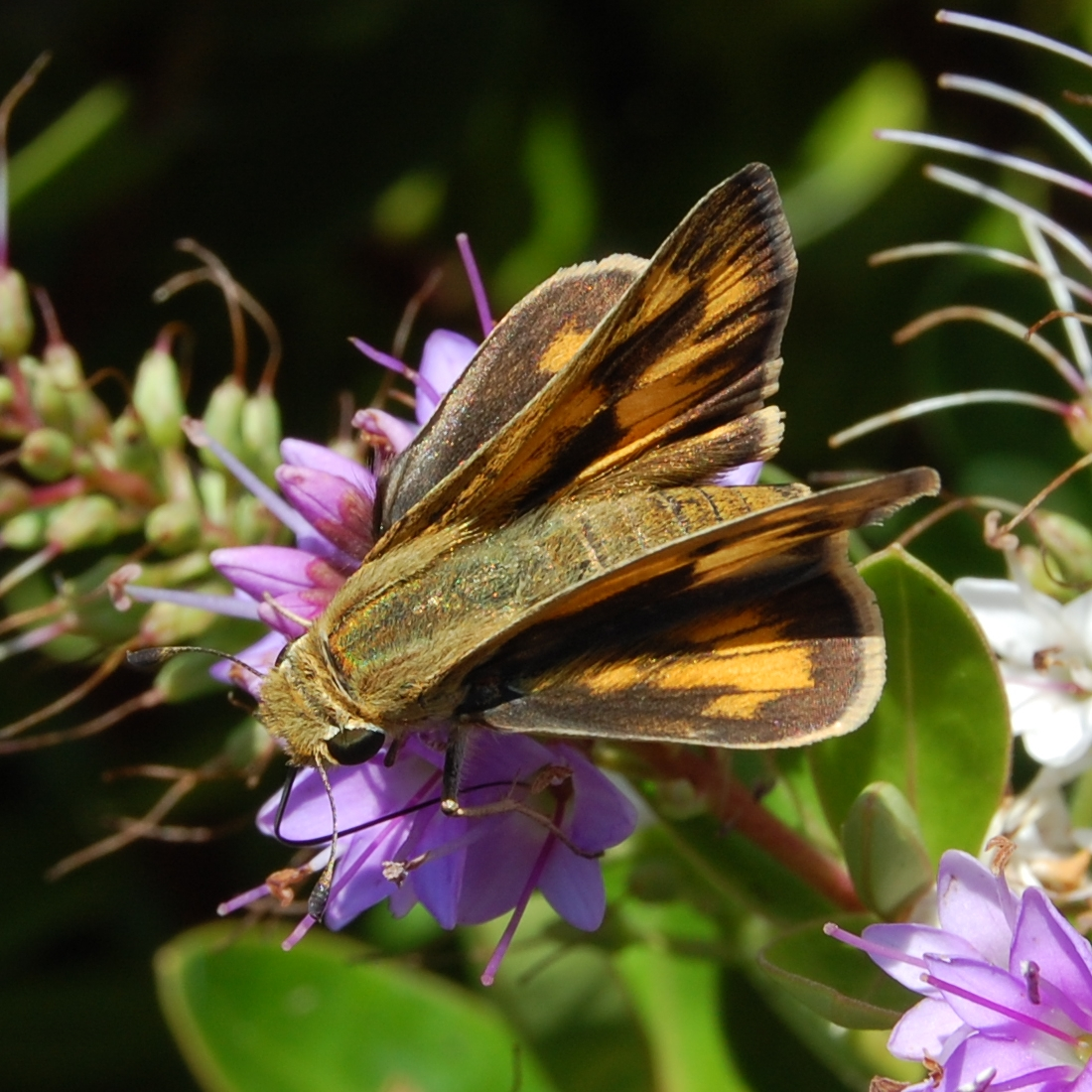
- Hylephila phyleus

Scientific classification
- Kingdom: Animalia
- Phylum: Arthropoda
- Class: Insecta
- Order: Lepidoptera
- Family: Hesperiidae
- Tribe: Hesperiini
- Genus: Hylephila; Billberg, 1820

= Hylephila =

Genus of butterflies

Hylephila is a genus of skippers in the family Hesperiidae.

== Species ==
- The ignorans species group
  - Hylephila adriennae MacNeill & Herrera, 1998
  - Hylephila ignorans (Plötz, 1883)
- The venusta species group
  - Hylephila kenhaywardi MacNeill, 1998
  - Hylephila lamasi MacNeill & Herrera, 1998
  - Hylephila venustus (Hayward, 1940)
- The boulleti species group
  - Hylephila blancasi MacNeill, 2002
  - Hylephila boulleti (Mabille, 1906)
  - Hylephila galera Evans, 1955
  - Hylephila herrerai MacNeill, 2002
  - Hylephila pallisteri MacNeill, 2002
  - Hylephila peruana Draudt, 1923
  - Hylephila pseudoherrerai MacNeill, 2002
  - Hylephila rossi MacNeill, 2002
  - Hylephila shapiroi MacNewil, 2002
  - Hylephila tentativa MacNeill, 2002
- The phyleus species group
  - Hylephila phyleus (Drury, [1773])
- Unknown species group
  - Hylephila ancora (Plötz, 1883)
  - Hylephila fasciolata (Blanchard, 1852)
  - Hylephila isonira Dyar, 1913
  - Hylephila signata (Blanchard, 1852)
  - Hylephila zapala Evans, 1955
