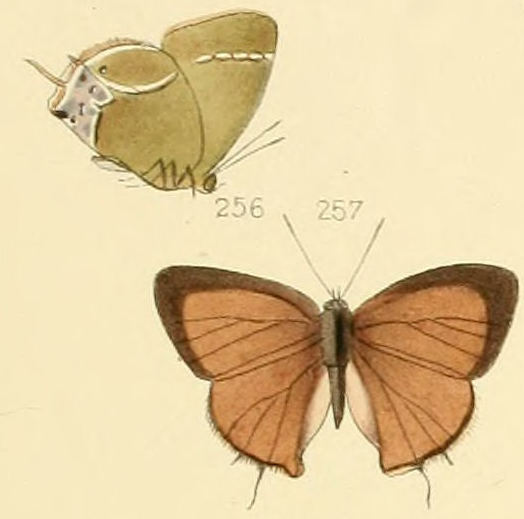

Scientific classification
- Kingdom: Animalia
- Phylum: Arthropoda
- Class: Insecta
- Order: Lepidoptera
- Family: Lycaenidae
- Genus: Callophrys
- Species: C. xami

Binomial name
- Callophrys xami Reakirt, 1867

= Callophrys xami =

Species of butterfly

Callophrys xami, commonly referred to as the xami hairstreak or green hairstreak, is a butterfly included in the subgenus Xamia and the genus Callophrys in the family Lycaenidae. It was described by Tryon Reakirt in 1867. Other common names for this species, depending on the region, include green hairstreak and elfin. C. xami is considered to be a very rare species of butterfly, and its typical range is in southern Arizona and Texas including down south to Guatemala. The juniper hairstreak and the silver-banded hairstreak butterflies are similar species, but both differ significantly from C. xami in regards to the postmedian white line running across the butterfly wings.

== Description ==
C. xami is a tailed species of butterfly that has a wingspan range of 2.38 to 2.86 cm. In appearance, the underside of the hindwing is yellowish green; the wing also contains the postmedian white line, which is the discernible colored line located posterior to the middle of the wing, that forms a W-shape toward the tails of the butterfly. Some species that appear similar to C. xami include the juniper hairstreak and the silver-banded hairstreak. The major differences are that the juniper species lacks the sharp W mark in the postmedian white band while the silver-banded species has a broader silver-white postmedian line on the underside of the hindwing.

== Geographic range and habitat ==
C. xami is found primarily in the southern U.S., specifically the southern and southeastern parts of Arizona and central Texas, and as far south as Mexico and Guatemala. The butterfly's range is predominantly contained in North America and parts of Central America. C. xami can be found near coniferous woodland forests and in relatively sunny areas along mountain and canyon slopes that provide shade. These butterflies dwell in areas with cool to warm temperate climates and weather patterns.

== Male territory defense ==
In terms of territoriality, male C. xami often shift territories as territories play a large role in mate location and courtship. Specifically, competing males may intrude into another male's territory, thereby aggressively displacing that butterfly and causing it to shift territory. Another reason that males may leave their given territory is to search for better territory, such as territories that provide better resources or better access to mates. Male-male competition is high for territory. Once a male forfeits and abandons his territory, another male quickly fills the gap to increase his chances gaining access to food and other resources.

== Host plants ==
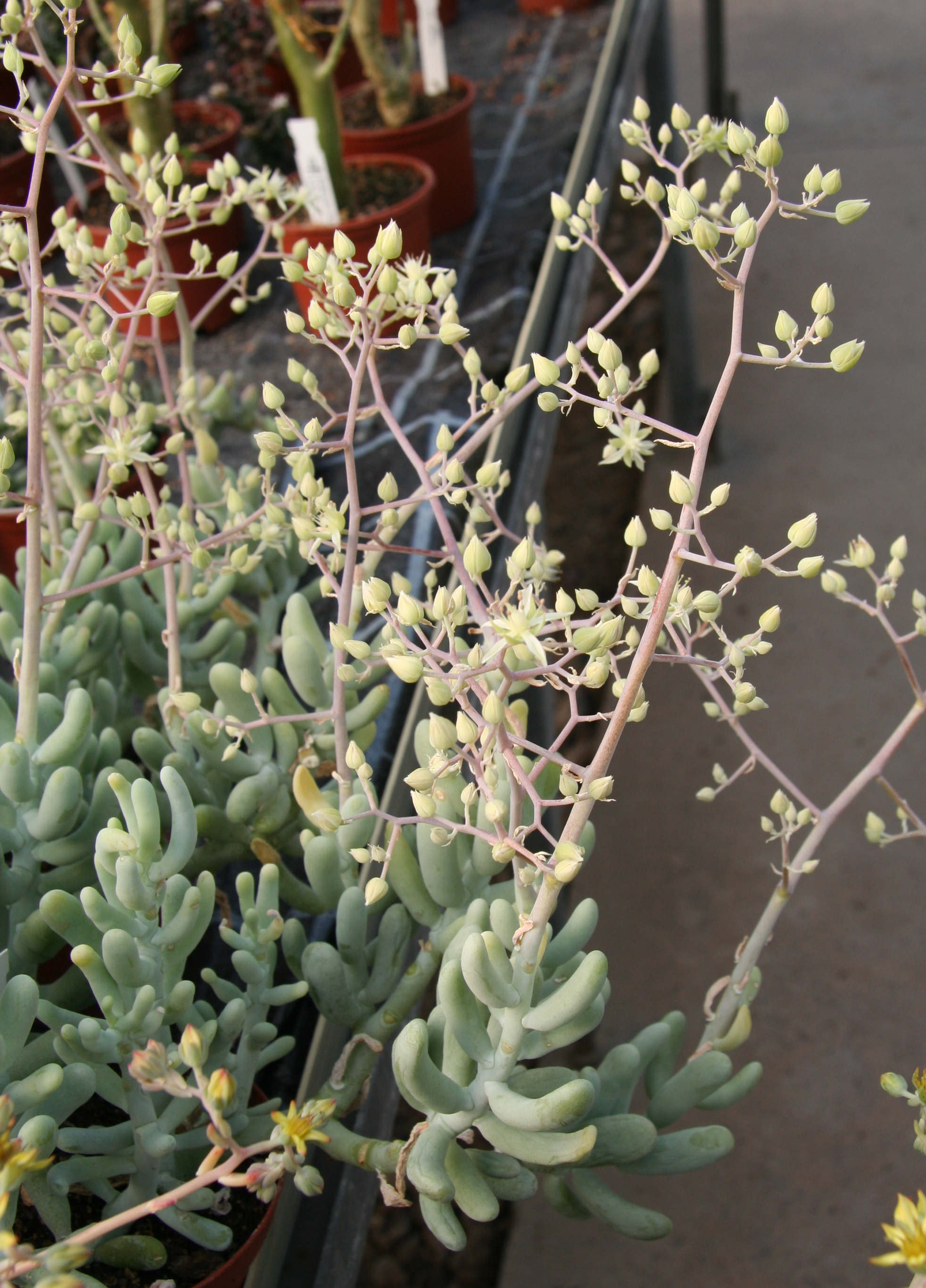
Sedum allantoides, one of C. xami's preferred host plants

The majority of C. xami's host plants come from Echeveria and Sedum, two genera of flowering plants in the family Crassulaceae. Many of these flowering plants are native to parts of western and southwestern United States and Mexico. In Mexico, Echevelia gibbiflora and Sedum allantoides are the most common host plants. The role of host plants is integral to the oviposition of C. xami. These plants also serve as a main food resource for the C. xami larvae.

== Oviposition ==
The process of oviposition in C. xami begins with the male butterfly perching or slightly hovering above the host plant, most likely a plant of genus Echeveria. When perched on Echeveria, the male waits and watches for a female butterfly to pass or fly by. Females oviposit after they have found an acceptable plant. Oviposition takes place after copulation and can lasts for a duration of up to two days. Females most often deposit their eggs on the underside of the leaf, where they are most likely to be protected against predation. For C. xami and other species in Lepidoptera, the selective oviposition behavior exhibited by the female, such as preference for a specific host plant, may drive adaptations for certain defense mechanisms in that host plant.

== Life cycle ==
=== Egg ===
Eggs are spherically shaped and slightly flattened, approximately 0.7 to 0.8 mm in diameter and 0.5 mm in height. Eggs look similar to those of related species, such as the eggs of juniper hairstreaks and silver-banded hairstreaks. They are initially a pale, light green that gradually fades and turns white over time. The average duration of the egg stage in the life cycle for C. xami is roughly seven days. Eggs are usually found on the underside of the leaf of the host plant.

=== Larva ===
The larval stages of C. xami are not well documented, and thus, the precise number of instars and the timeframe of those instars is unknown. It is reported that there are at least three distinct and separate instars, but there is potential for a fourth or fifth instar stage. Throughout the first developmental stage of the first instar, larvae body length ranges from 0.8 to 1.0 mm. The larvae are variable in color based on age; in the case of the first instar, the body of the larvae, which is covered in tiny brownish hair follicles, is pale yellow in color with some shade of brown coloring the head portion. In the case of the second instar, the body of the larvae, now covered in tiny pinkish-red hair follicles, can range from yellow-green to pale pink in color. During the last larval stage, larvae body length usually measures about 16 mm. With the larvae body now covered in dark colored hair follicles, its coloring at this final instar stage can be yellowish-green in hue with a pale yellow coloring on the head of the larvae.

=== Pupa ===
In form and appearance, the pupae are not recognizably uniform or homogenous, but rather can vary in both coloring and physical size. In some cases, rough estimates put an individual pupa roughly between 9 and 11 mm in diameter. In color, the pupae can range between shades of brown, from light to dark, as well as reddish brown and even black. Spotting, usually dark brown in color, may or may not be seen on some parts of the body during pupation. Another characteristic feature of this stage is the presence of two small pale brown spines at the tip of the abdomen.

== Migration and flight behavior ==
C. xami has two or more flights during the year, most often between the months of March and December. With Mexico comprising a large geographical range for this butterfly, it is reported that the greatest number of adult butterflies observed near Mexico City happens during the flight months from July to September, followed a few months later by the flight months from December to January. A third, lesson common and less abundant flight period takes place from April to May. The general flight periods are the months of June and from September to December.

== Defense against predators ==
C. xami exhibits wing morphology, warding off predators with the color and morphology of its hind wings, which appear to be a false head. The color patterns of the hindwing create the appearance of a head at the rear of the insect's body. These "false heads" help C. xami survive predation from mantises and other visually oriented predators such as birds. Additionally, it is possible that these pseudo-head markings confer a survival advantage to the butterflies by deflecting predator attacks towards the hind wing and lower half of the butterfly's body and away from the unprotected actual head.

== Mating and courtship ==
=== Courtship behavior ===
C. xami is a polygynous butterfly species, in which butterflies take different mates several times over the course of their lives. An important part of courtship is territory defense, specifically the active defense of territories by males. Competition for territory space may result from the fact that territories often function as mating stations and spaces for active courtship. Furthermore, multiple mating is generally advantageous for male insects to increase the likelihood of producing more offspring. As male-male competition is high, the exact nature of the relationship between male fitness and frequency of matings may be unclear due to sperm competition, cryptic female choice, and cost to benefit ratio of mating.

=== Typical courtship process ===
The general process for a typical courtship interaction begins when a female flies near a perching male, who is most likely perched on the typical host plant of Echeveria gibbiflora. After the female passes by, the male flies around and follows the female and a courtship flight dance in the air begins; at some point in this courtship flight, which lasts approximately 30 seconds, the male flies closely behind and slightly above the simultaneously flying female butterfly. Together, the male and female perch closely together on a plant, most likely the host plant Echeveria, and the male butterfly assumes a position in front of the female with their heads facing each other. In terms of motion, the male continuously and aggressively flutters his wings while the female remains still with her wings closed. Eventually, the male butterfly moves into a position right next to the female, with the heads and tails of both butterflies aligned, and makes genital contact with the female. After copulation ends, which may last several hours, the male may return to perch on the plant whereas the female may leave the area, thus ending this cycle of the courtship process. It has also been found that there may be a correlation between the absence of the ornaments that this species has on the forewings and the mate choice, at least in the male choice, indicating that these 'false head' ornaments are an evolutionary exaptation for antipredation behavior and mate choice.
