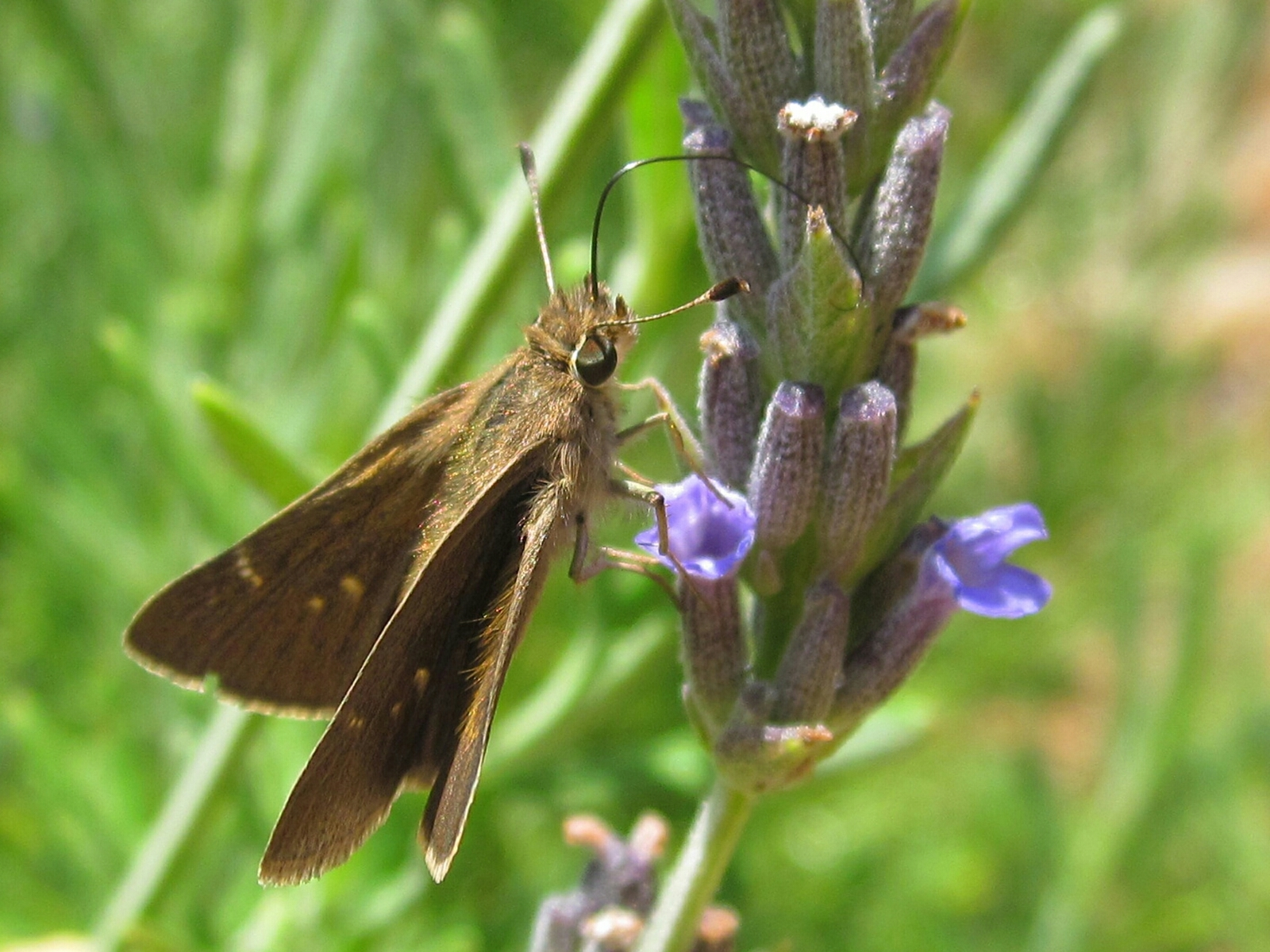
- Lerodea eufala

Scientific classification
- Kingdom: Animalia
- Phylum: Arthropoda
- Class: Insecta
- Order: Lepidoptera
- Family: Hesperiidae
- Subtribe: Moncina
- Genus: Lerodea; Scudder, 1872

= Lerodea =

Genus of butterflies

Lerodea is a genus of skippers in the family Hesperiidae.

== Species ==
- Lerodea eufala (Edwards, 1869) - type species by original genus designation
- Lerodea arabus (Edwards, 1882)
- Lerodea casta (Hayward, 1942)
- Lerodea emba (Evans, 1955)
- Lerodea erythrostictus (Prittwitz, 1868)
- Lerodea gracia (Dyar, 1913)
- Lerodea sonex Grishin, 2022
- Lerodea williamsi (Hayward, 1942)
