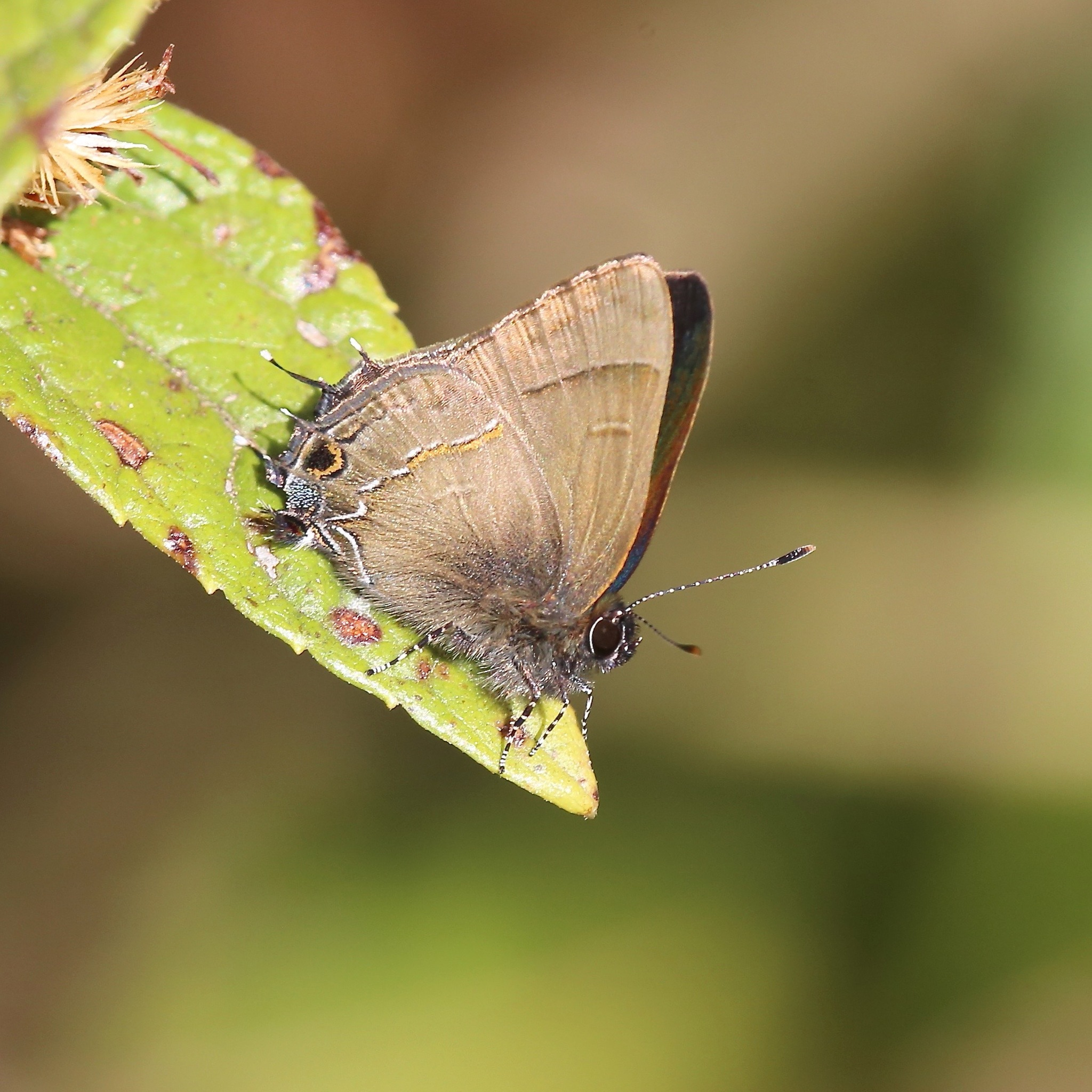

Scientific classification
- Domain: Eukaryota
- Kingdom: Animalia
- Phylum: Arthropoda
- Class: Insecta
- Order: Lepidoptera
- Family: Lycaenidae
- Genus: Electrostrymon
- Species: E. denarius

Binomial name
- Electrostrymon denarius (Butler & H. Druce, 1872)

= Electrostrymon denarius =

Species of butterfly

Electrostrymon denarius is a butterfly of the family Lycaenidae.

== Distribution ==
Electrostrymon denarius is distributed from Mexico to Panama and occurs at elevations between 50 and 1750 m.

== Diet ==
Caterpillars of E. denarius live in the leaf litter, where they feed on mushrooms and probably other organic matter in this environment. It is the first New World butterfly species discovered to feed on mushrooms during its larval stage.
