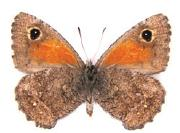
- Auca coctei

Scientific classification
- Domain: Eukaryota
- Kingdom: Animalia
- Phylum: Arthropoda
- Class: Insecta
- Order: Lepidoptera
- Family: Nymphalidae
- Subfamily: Satyrinae
- Genus: Auca; Hayward, 1953

Species
- Auca coctei; Auca delessei; Auca pales

= Auca (butterfly) =

Genus of butterflies

Auca is a genus of butterflies from the subfamily Satyrinae in the family Nymphalidae. The species in the genus Auca occur in Chile and Argentina and are common throughout the south-temperate region.
