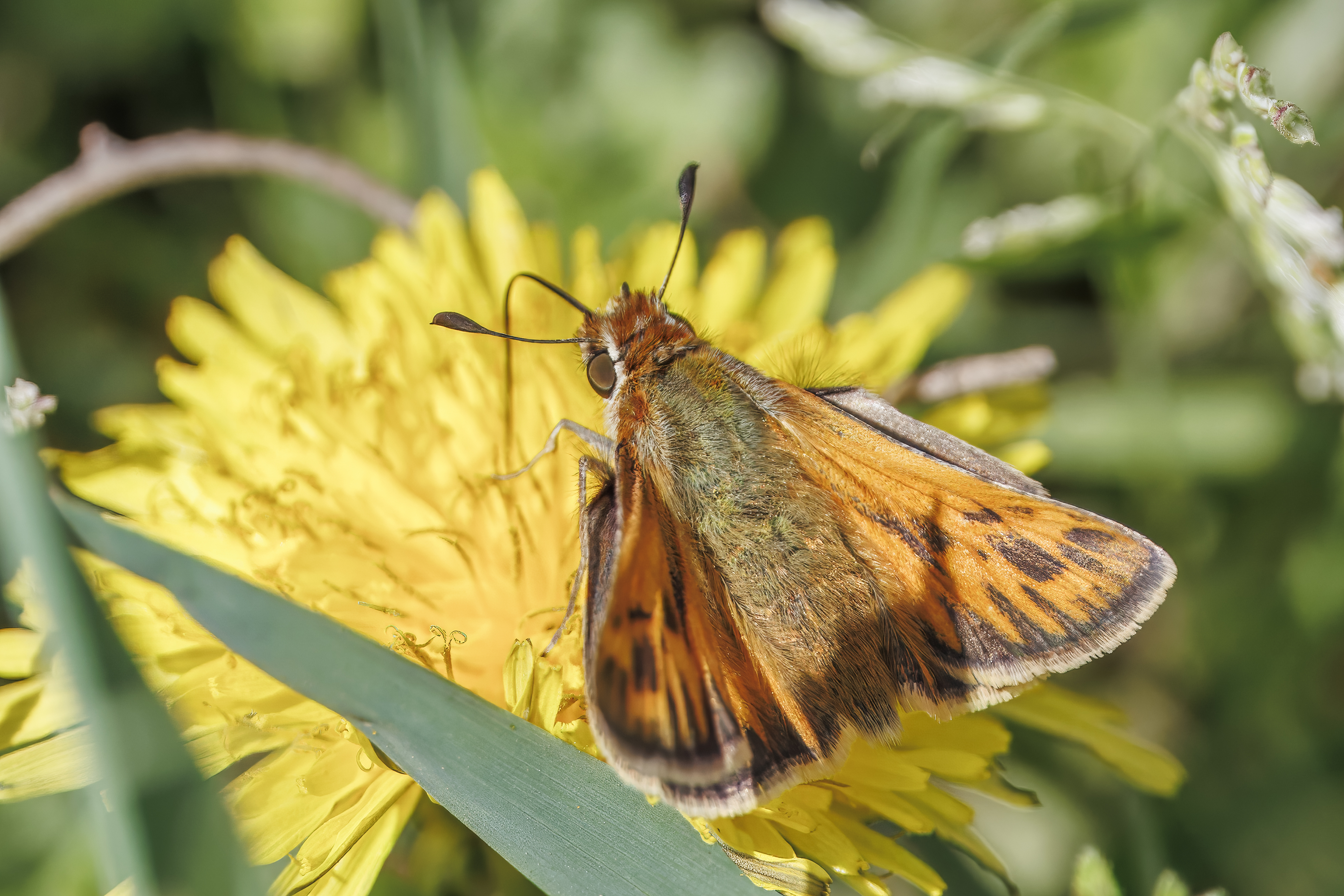
- Santiago, Chile

Scientific classification
- Kingdom: Animalia
- Phylum: Arthropoda
- Class: Insecta
- Order: Lepidoptera
- Family: Hesperiidae
- Genus: Hylephila
- Species: H. signata

Binomial name
- Hylephila signata (Blanchard, 1852)

Synonyms
- Hesperia signata Blanchard, 1852; Hesperia fulva Blanchard, 1852; Hesperia lujana Plötz, 1883; Hesperia grynea Plötz, 1883; Pamphila antarctica Mabille, 1883; Hylephila fulva f. uretai Hayward, 1940; Hylephila fulva haywardi Bryk, 1944; Hylephila fulva haywardi f. paupera Bryk, 1944

= Hylephila signata =

Species of butterfly

Hylephila signata is a species of butterfly in the family Hesperiidae. It was first described by Émile Blanchard in 1852. It is found in Chile, Brazil and Argentina.
