= Strymon flavaria =

Scientific classification
- Kingdom: Animalia
- Phylum: Arthropoda
- Class: Insecta
- Order: Lepidoptera
- Family: Lycaenidae
- Genus: Strymon
- Species: S. flavaria

Binomial name
- Strymon flavaria (Ureta, 1956)

Synonyms
- Thecla flavaria Ureta, 1956; Heoda erani Benyamini & Johnson, 1996

Species of butterfly

Strymon flavaria is a butterfly of the family Lycaenidae. It was described by Ureta in 1956. It is found in Chile.
