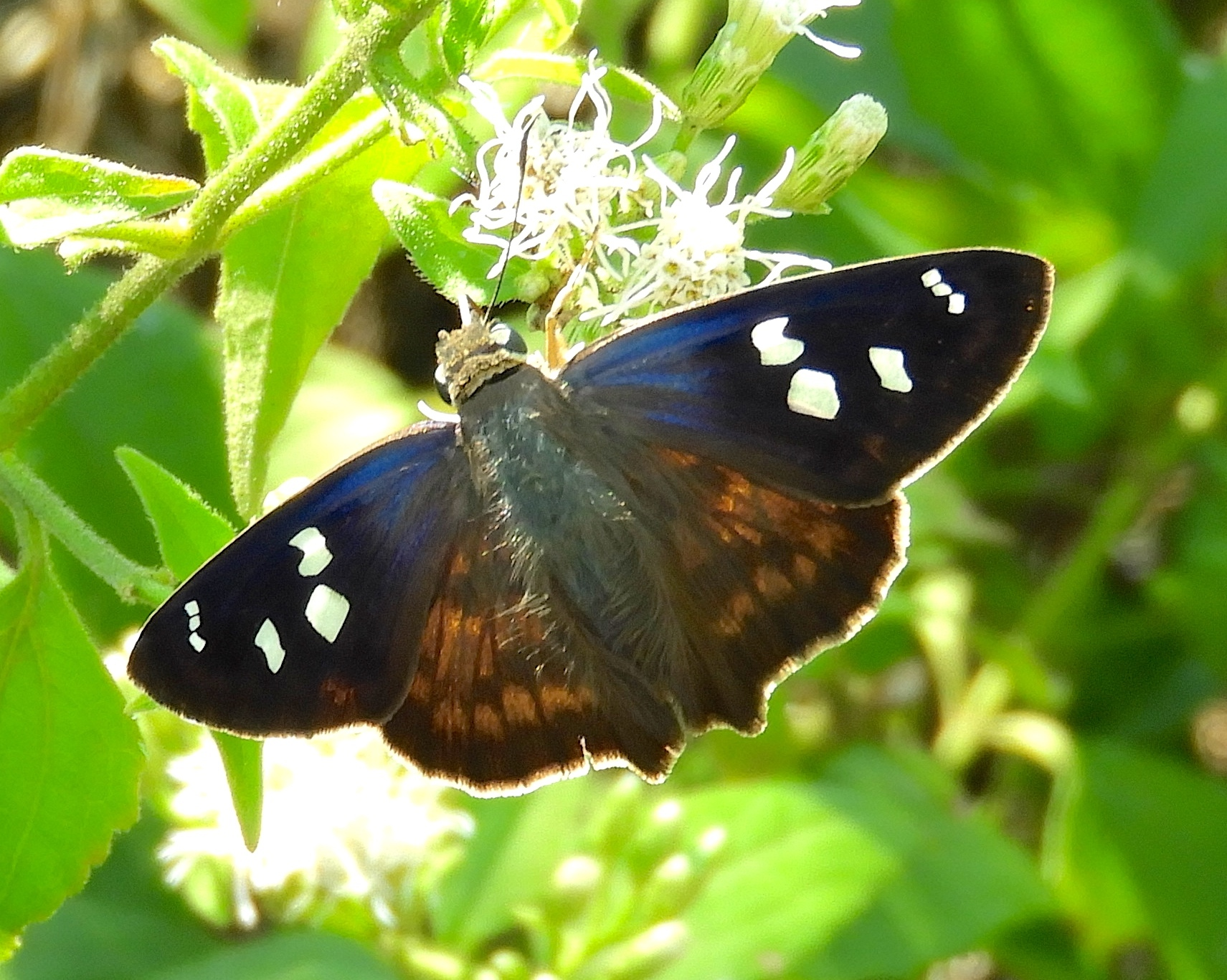
- Polygonus savigny ssp. savigny

Scientific classification
- Kingdom: Animalia
- Phylum: Arthropoda
- Class: Insecta
- Order: Lepidoptera
- Family: Hesperiidae
- Genus: Polygonus
- Species: P. savigny

Binomial name
- Polygonus savigny (Latreille, 1824)

= Polygonus savigny =

Species of butterfly

Polygonus savigny, or Manuel's skipper, is a species of dicot skipper in the butterfly family Hesperiidae. It is found in North America.

== Subspecies ==
These two subspecies belong to the species Polygonus savigny:

- Polygonus savigny punctus Bell & Comstock, 1852
- Polygonus savigny savigny (Latreille, 1824)
