= Hylephila ancora =

Scientific classification
- Kingdom: Animalia
- Phylum: Arthropoda
- Class: Insecta
- Order: Lepidoptera
- Family: Hesperiidae
- Genus: Hylephila
- Species: H. ancora

Binomial name
- Hylephila ancora (Plötz, 1883)

Synonyms
- Hesperia ancora Plötz, 1883

Species of butterfly

Hylephila ancora, commonly known as the Ancora skipper, is a species of butterfly in the family Hesperiidae. It was first described by Carl Plötz in 1883. It is found in Bolivia, Uruguay and Argentina.
