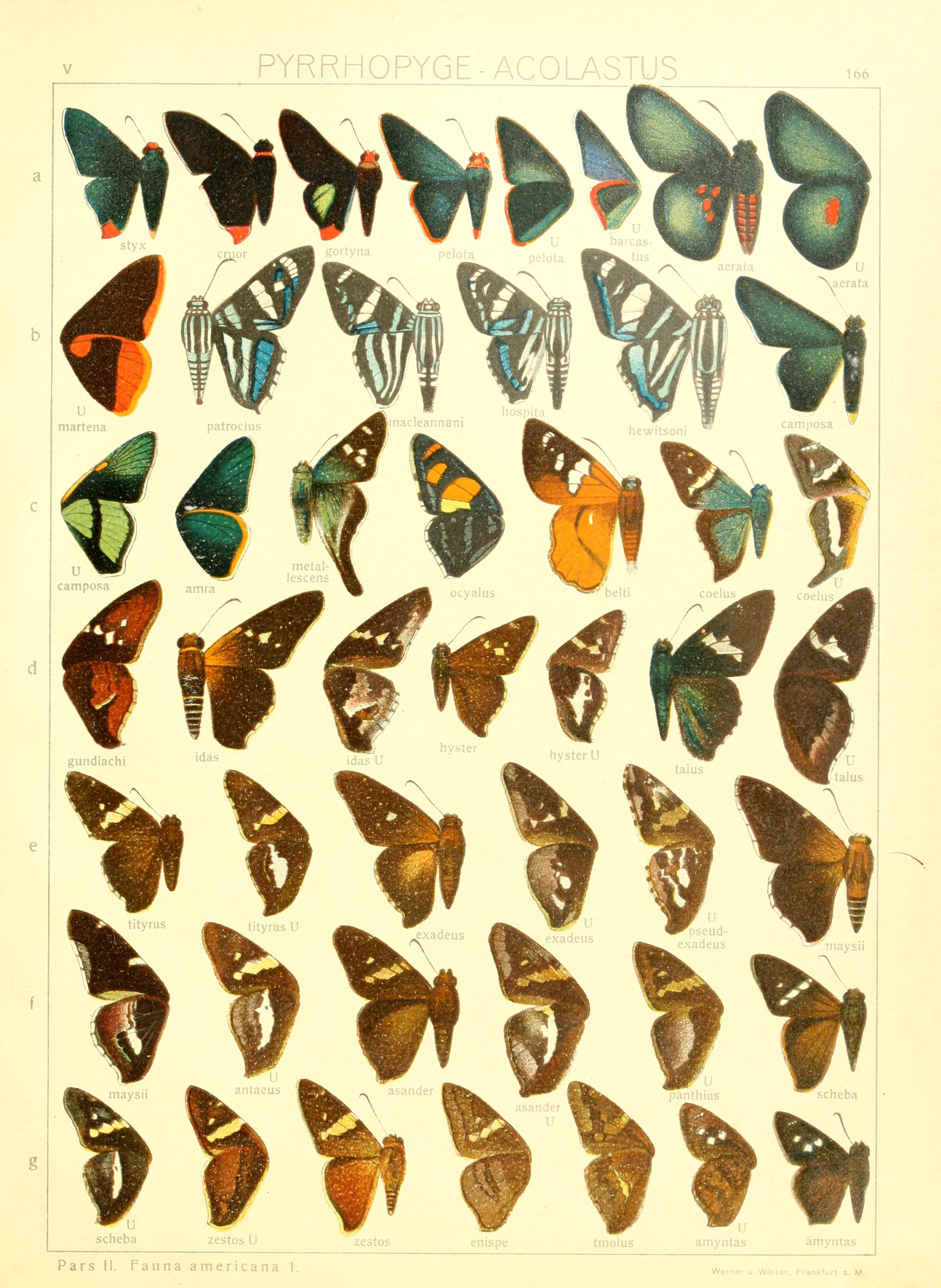
- Polygonus and related genera depicted in Adalbert Seitz's Macrolepidoptera of the World

Scientific classification
- Kingdom: Animalia
- Phylum: Arthropoda
- Class: Insecta
- Order: Lepidoptera
- Family: Hesperiidae
- Subfamily: Eudaminae
- Tribe: Eudamini
- Subtribe: Telemiadina
- Genus: Polygonus; Hübner, [1825]

Synonyms
- Acolastus Scudder, 1872; Nennius Kirby, [1902]

= Polygonus (butterfly) =

Genus of butterflies

Polygonus is a genus of Nearctic and Neotropical spread-winged skippers in the family Hesperiidae.

== Species ==
The following two species are recognised in the genus Polygonus:

- Polygonus leo (Gmelin, [1790]) – hammock skipper – Argentina
  - P. leo leo (Gmelin, [1790]) – Brazil to Florida, Hispaniola
  - P. leo arizonensis (Skinner, 1911) – south California, Arizona, west Texas, south New Mexico, Mexico
  - P. leo hagar Evans, 1952 – Jamaica
  - P. leo histrio Röber, 1925 – Arizona
  - P. leo pallida Röber, 1925 – Peru
- Polygonus savigny (Latreille, [1824]) – Manuel's skipper – St. Christoper, Montserrat, St. Barthélémy, south Florida, Antilles, Argentina, Central America, South America
  - P. savigny savigny (Latreille, [1824]) – Brazil (Santa Catarina),
  - P. savigny punctus Bell & Comstock, 1948 – Saint Vincent
