= Chlorostrymon kuscheli =

Scientific classification
- Kingdom: Animalia
- Phylum: Arthropoda
- Class: Insecta
- Order: Lepidoptera
- Family: Lycaenidae
- Genus: Chlorostrymon
- Species: C. kuscheli

Binomial name
- Chlorostrymon kuscheli (Ureta, 1949)

Synonyms
- Thecla kuscheli Ureta, 1949

Species of butterfly

Chlorostrymon kuscheli is a butterfly of the family Lycaenidae. It was described by Emilio Ureta Rojas in 1949. It is found in northern Tarapaca, Chile.
