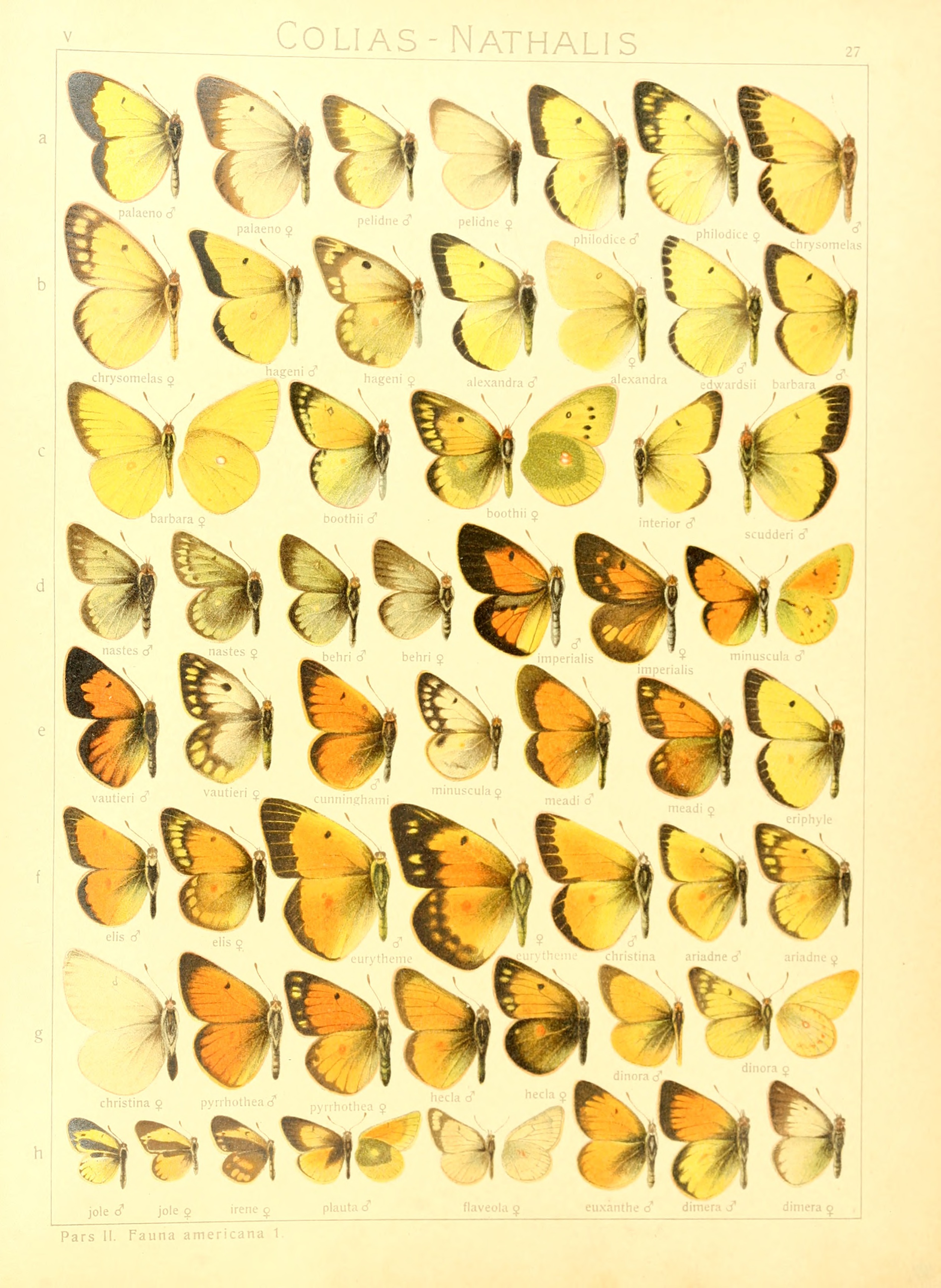
- Row h, 5th butterfly

Scientific classification
- Kingdom: Animalia
- Phylum: Arthropoda
- Class: Insecta
- Order: Lepidoptera
- Family: Pieridae
- Genus: Colias
- Species: C. flaveola

Binomial name
- Colias flaveola Blanchard, 1852

Synonyms
- Colias weberbaueri Strand, 1912; Colias euxanthe alticola ab. virescens Rothschild, 1913; Colias euxanthe nigerrima Fassl, 1915; Colias mossi Rothschild, 1913; Colias blameyi Jörgensen, 1916; Colias mendozina Breyer, 1939

= Colias flaveola =

Species of butterfly

Colias flaveola is a butterfly in the family Pieridae. It is found in the Tropical Andes subregion of the Neotropical realm.

== Description ==
Colias flaveola is pale orange yellow in the female, in the rather broad dark distal margin of the forewing are placed four large yellowish-white subapical spots, the under surface has dull sulphur-yellow ground colour. Deeper orange-yellow coloured female specimens are common.

== Subspecies ==
- C. f. flaveola Chile
- C. f. weberbaueri Strand, 1912 Peru, Bolivia
- C. f. mossi Rothschild, 1913 Peru
- C. f. blameyi Jörgensen, 1916 Argentina
- C. f. mendozina Breyer, 1939 Argentina
- C. f. erika Lamas, 1981 Peru

== Taxonomy ==
Accepted as a species by Josef Grieshuber & Gerardo Lamas.
