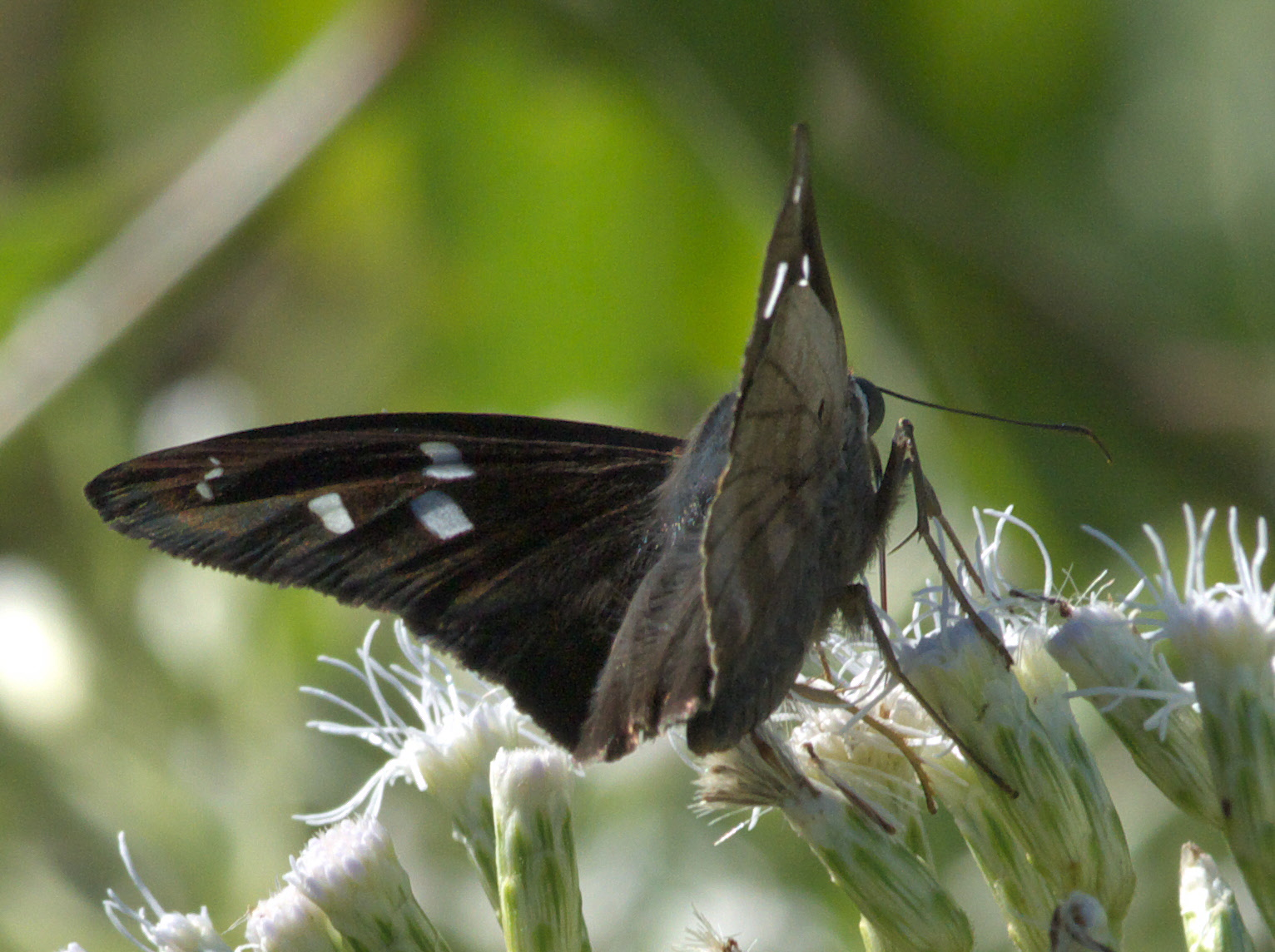

Scientific classification
- Kingdom: Animalia
- Phylum: Arthropoda
- Class: Insecta
- Order: Lepidoptera
- Family: Hesperiidae
- Genus: Polygonus
- Species: P. leo

Binomial name
- Polygonus leo (Gmelin, 1790)

= Polygonus leo =

Species of butterfly

Polygonus leo, the hammock skipper, is a species of dicot skipper in the butterfly family Hesperiidae. It is found in the Caribbean Sea, Central America, North America, and South America.

== Subspecies ==
The following subspecies are recognised:

- Polygonus leo arizonensis (Skinner, 1911)
- Polygonus leo pallida Röber, 1925
- Polygonus leo histrio Röber, 1925
- Polygonus leo leo (Gmelin, 1790)
- Polygonus leo hagar Evans, 1952
