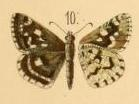

Scientific classification
- Kingdom: Animalia
- Phylum: Arthropoda
- Clade: Pancrustacea
- Class: Insecta
- Order: Lepidoptera
- Family: Hesperiidae
- Genus: Hylephila
- Species: H. fasciolata

Binomial name
- Hylephila fasciolata (Blanchard, 1852)

Synonyms
- Hesperia fasciolata Blanchard, 1852; Hesperia emma Plötz, 1883

= Hylephila fasciolata =

Species of butterfly

Hylephila fasciolata, commonly known as the fasciolata skipper, is a species of butterfly in the family Hesperiidae. It was first described by Émile Blanchard in 1852. It is found in Chile and Argentina.
