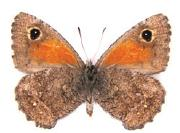

Scientific classification
- Domain: Eukaryota
- Kingdom: Animalia
- Phylum: Arthropoda
- Class: Insecta
- Order: Lepidoptera
- Family: Nymphalidae
- Genus: Auca
- Species: A. coctei

Binomial name
- Auca coctei (Guérin-Méneville, [1838])

Synonyms
- Satyrus coctei Guérin-Méneville, [1838]; Satyrus tragiscus Reed, 1877 (nomen nudum); Epinephele coctei var. confusa Köhler, 1935; Epinephele nycteropus andensis Köhler, 1939

= Auca coctei =

Species of butterfly

Auca coctei is a species of butterfly in the family Nymphalidae. It is found in Chile and Argentina.

The larvae feed on various species of bunch grass.
