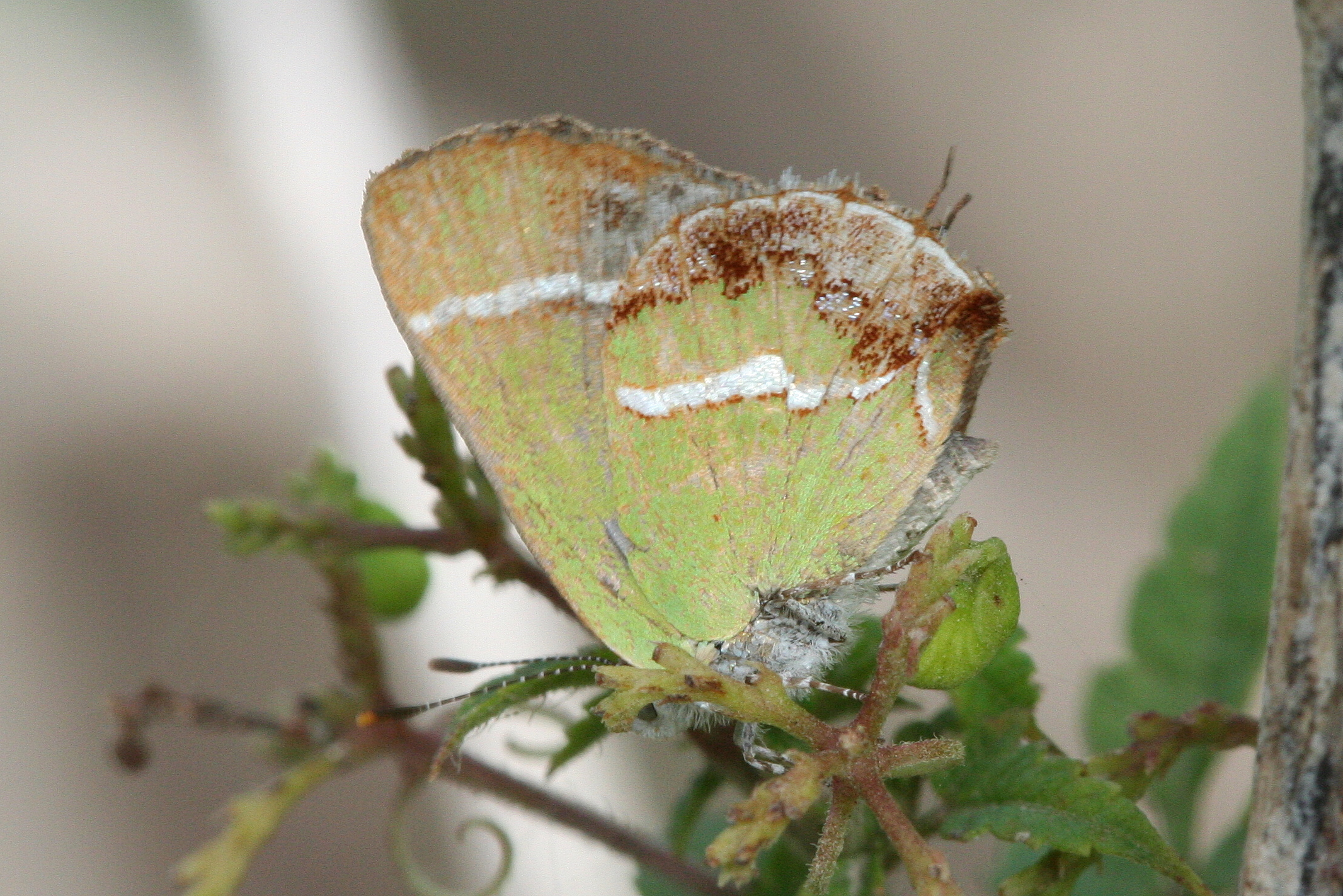

Scientific classification
- Domain: Eukaryota
- Kingdom: Animalia
- Phylum: Arthropoda
- Class: Insecta
- Order: Lepidoptera
- Family: Lycaenidae
- Genus: Chlorostrymon
- Species: C. simaethis

Binomial name
- Chlorostrymon simaethis (Drury, 1773)

Synonyms
- Thecla sarita Skinner, 1895; Thecla lycus Skinner, 1898; Thecla simaethis jago W. P. Comstock & Huntington, 1943; Chlorostrymon simaethis rosario Nicolay, 1980; Chlorostrymon chileana K. Johnson, 1989

= Chlorostrymon simaethis =

Silver-banded hairstreak

Species of butterfly

Chlorostrymon simaethis, the silver-banded hairstreak, is a North and South American butterfly in the family Lycaenidae. It is also known as St. Christopher's hairstreak and the Key lime hairstreak.

== Description ==
The upperside of the wings is dark, iridescent purple in males. Females are grayish brown, sometimes having iridescent purple on the basal area of the wings. The underside of the wings is bright, lime green in both sexes. Both wings have a bright silvery-white postmedian band. The silver band on the hindwing juts out towards the margin and turns back in, forming a V shape. Beyond this band, there is a dark brownish-red patch with a variable amount of silvery-white frosting. The frosting extends across the entire edge of the hindwing. The hindwings have one pair of tails. The wingspan ranges from 2.2 to 3.2 cm.

== Similar species ==
The amethyst hairstreak (Chlorostrymon maesites) is the only similar species in the silver-banded hairstreak's range.

The amethyst hairstreak is smaller. The upperside of the male is dark, vivid, purplish blue. The upperside of the female is bright blue with dark forewing apexes. The underside of the forewing lacks the silver band. The hindwing has a silver band but it does not stretch across the entire wing. The hindwings have two pairs of tails.

Another related butterfly species to Chlorostrymon simaethis found in North America is Callophrys xami, which is commonly referred to as the xami hairstreak or green hairstreak. Aesthetically, C. simaethis differs significantly from C. xami in regards to the postmedian white line running across the butterfly wings as the silver-banded species has a much broader silver-white postmedian line on the underside of the hindwing.

== Habitat ==
The silver-banded hairstreak is found in habitats such as subtropical woodlands, deserts, and hammock edges. It is found in these habitats only if its host plants are nearby.

== Flight period ==
The silver-banded hairstreak is seen from May to December in southern Florida and from June to December in southern Texas. It is seen from March to June and again from October to mid-November in southern Arizona. It will occasionally stray to southern California in October.

These butterflies are usually a very pretty light green with a white streak along the top of the wing. Some say this butterfly is a blue to a light brown.

== Life cycle ==
The female lays her eggs singly on the young fruits of the host plant. The eggs are shiny green. The caterpillar lives inside the seed pod of the host plant and feeds on the unripe seeds. The caterpillar is yellowish green to a brownish color. It has dark, wavy dorsal and subdorsal lines. There is a dark greenish middorsal stripe edged on each side with red ovals. The head is tan. The caterpillar will turn red just before pupating. The chrysalis is tan to grayish brown with a gray middorsal stripe. It is covered in black and brown spots. It is attached to a surface by a silk pad and girdle. The silver-banded hairstreak has two or three broods per year.

== Host plants ==
Host plants of the silver-banded hairstreak:

- Cardiospermum halicacabum – balloon vine
- Cardiospermum corindum – faux persil
- Eupatorium villosum – Florida Keys thoroughwort
