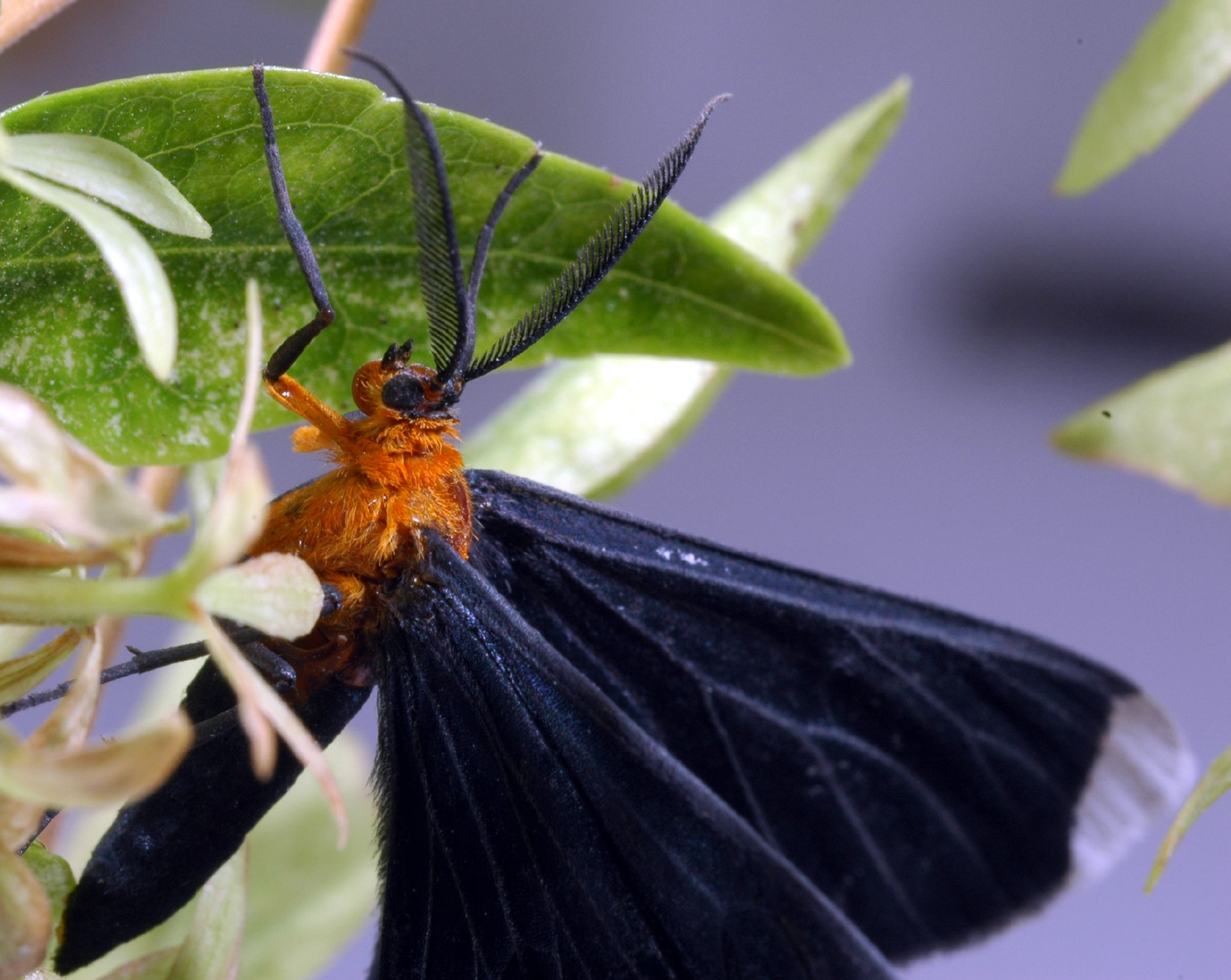

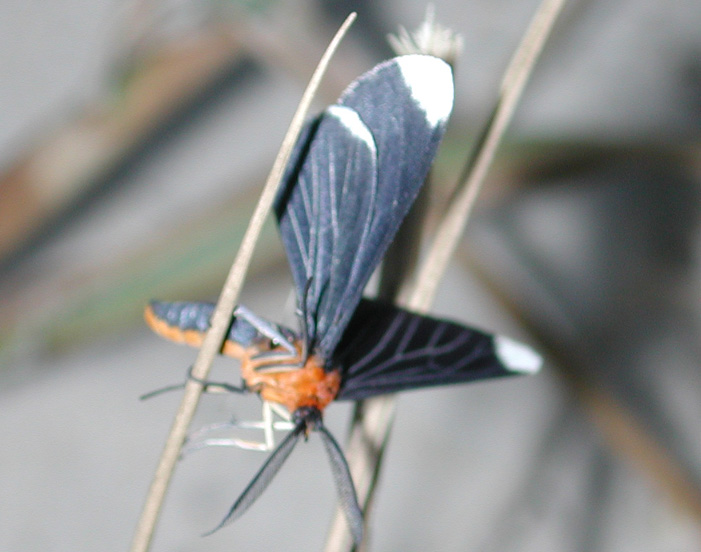

Scientific classification
- Kingdom: Animalia
- Phylum: Arthropoda
- Class: Insecta
- Order: Lepidoptera
- Family: Geometridae
- Genus: Melanchroia
- Species: M. chephise

Binomial name
- Melanchroia chephise (Stoll, 1782)

Synonyms
- Phalaena chephise Stoll, [1782]; Tanagra expositata Walker, 1862

= Melanchroia chephise =

Species of moth

Melanchroia chephise, the white-tipped black or snowbush spanworm, is a moth of the family Geometridae. It is found from Florida and Texas, south to Paraguay. Strays have been recorded from Arizona, Oklahoma, Arkansas, Kansas and Illinois.

The wingspan is about 33 mm. Adults are on wing from September to December.

Larvae feed on Phyllanthaceae species, including Breynia and Phyllanthus.
