= Argopteron aureum =

Scientific classification
- Kingdom: Animalia
- Phylum: Arthropoda
- Clade: Pancrustacea
- Class: Insecta
- Order: Lepidoptera
- Family: Hesperiidae
- Genus: Argopteron
- Species: A. aureum

Binomial name
- Argopteron aureum Peña, 1968

Species of butterfly

Argopteron aureum is a butterfly of the family Hesperiidae. It was described by Peña in 1968. It is found in Chile.
