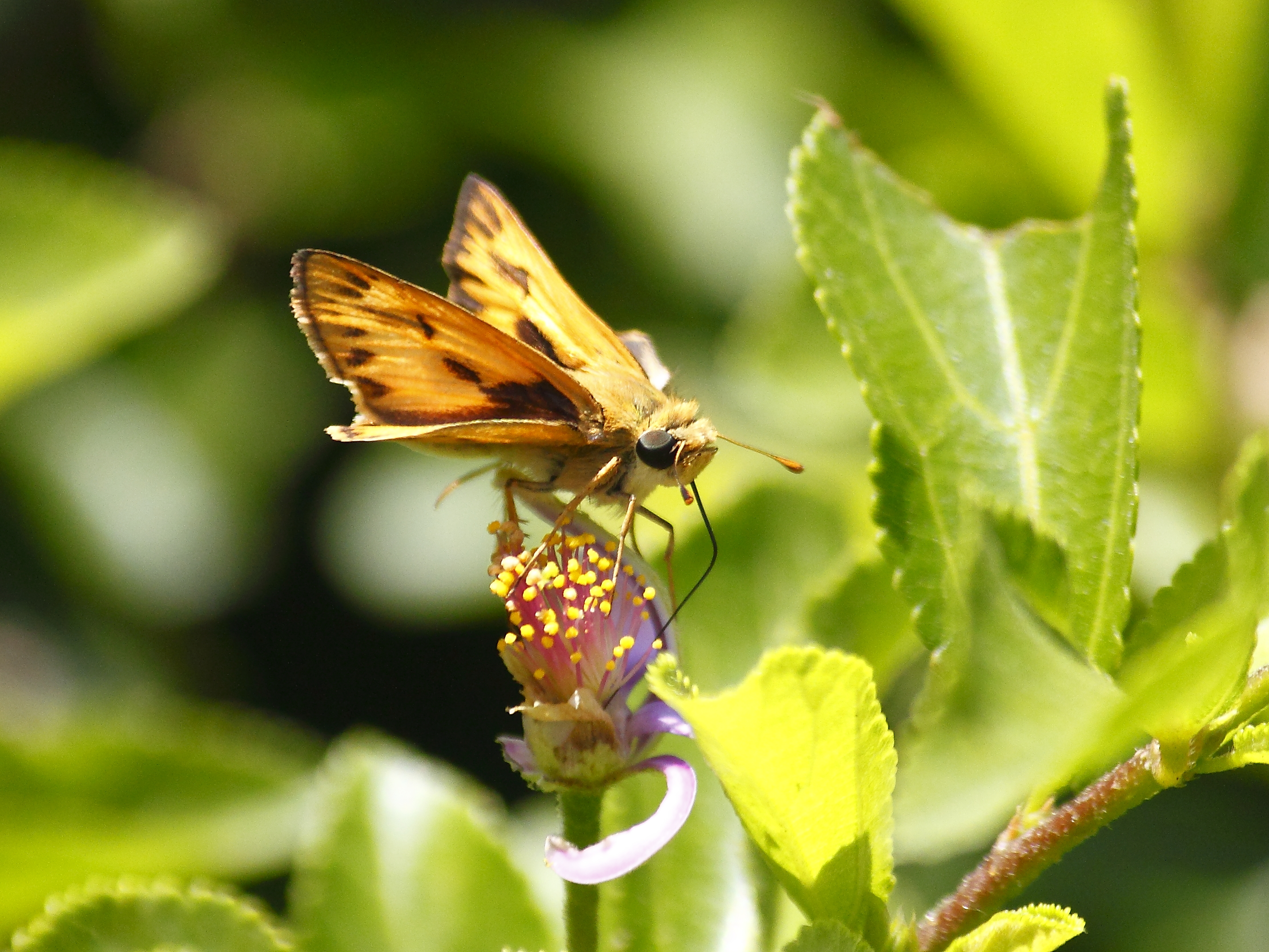
- Male
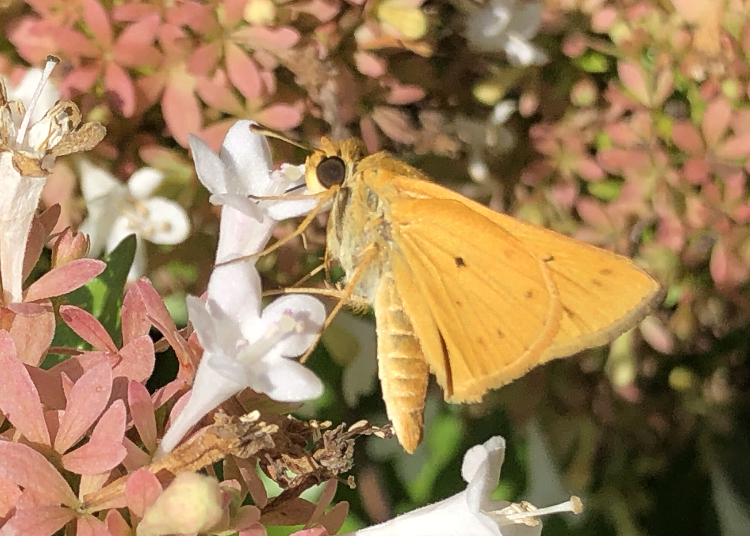
- In Oklahoma

Conservation status
- Secure (NatureServe)

Scientific classification
- Kingdom: Animalia
- Phylum: Arthropoda
- Class: Insecta
- Order: Lepidoptera
- Family: Hesperiidae
- Genus: Hylephila
- Species: H. phyleus

Binomial name
- Hylephila phyleus (Drury, 1773)

Subspecies
- Hylephila phyleus eureka (Austin and J. Emmel in T. Emmel, 1998); Hylephila phyleus muertovalle (Scott, 1981); Hylephila phyleus phyleus (Drury, 1773)

= Fiery skipper =

Species of butterfly

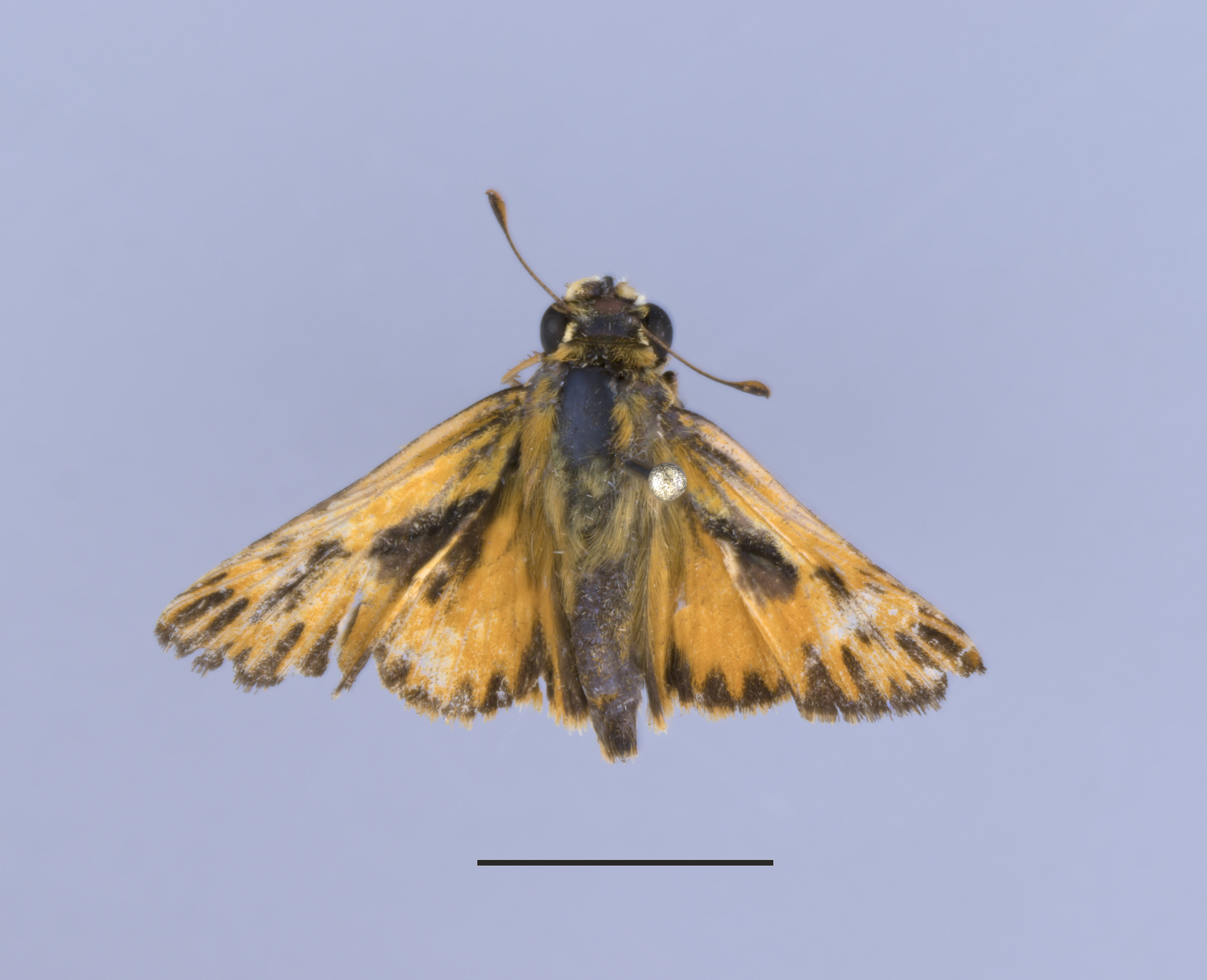
Hylephila phyleus (Drury, 1773); Order: Lepidoptera. Family: Hesperiidae. Scale bar in 1mm. Collected in GA, Baldwin Co., GCSU front campus on 9 October 2024, by Kaitlin Acosta

The fiery skipper (Hylephila phyleus) is a species of butterfly in the family Hesperiidae. Reaching approximately 1 inch (2.5 cm) in length, male fiery skippers are orange or yellow while the females are dark brown. Small brown spots may be observed on both the hindwing and forewing of both sexes although to a varying degree. Females may be darker brown overall with pale checkered markings on the hindwing. Fiery skipper larvae, or caterpillars, are greenish pink-grey with a black head and constricted neck. These larvae are often considered pests and can feed on Bermudagrass, creeping bentgrass, and St. Augustine grass.

Phylogenetic and genetic analysis of the fiery skipper revealed three haplotypes (HphH1, HphH26, and HphH31) to be shared in roughly 64.1% of all sampled individuals. Due to this high percentage, these haplotypes likely serve as central haplotypes from which different variations via mutations occurred. Haplotypes HphH22 and HphH23 were found in addition to HphH1, HphH26, and HphH31 to occur in species across all continents with certain haplotypes being prominent in different regions. More variation in haplotype may be observed in South America, suggesting populations may be larger and contain more diversity when compared to those of North America.

== Range ==
The fiery skipper has a wide range in North and South America, from Canada to Argentina. In the northern hemisphere, the butterfly may migrate north in summer months to the northern United States and southern Ontario, Canada. Possible reasons for this include high-density populations resulting in reproductive competition and strategy, resource availability, and courtship customs. In 2012, a female fiery skipper was photographed and correctly identified in New Brunswick, Canada, suggesting the species may occasionally travel as far north as the Maritime Provinces.

== Behavior ==
Fiery skippers, along with most other species of skippers and skipperlings, can hold their wings in a "triangle" shape. The forewings are held upright, and the hindwings are folded flat. This position is thought to better absorb the sun's rays. Fiery skippers have been described as "rapid flyers with darting movements" which often make them difficult to both observe and catch. These skippers are often found in urban settings and are known to hold a unique relationship with turfgrass such as Bermuda grass (Cynodon dactylon). In Hawaii, studies looking at the diet of fiery skipper larvae found individuals to grow most rapidly when fed a diet of "FB-137" Bermuda Grass. Given the wide range of these skippers, it is suggested the species will readily disperse given ample resources.

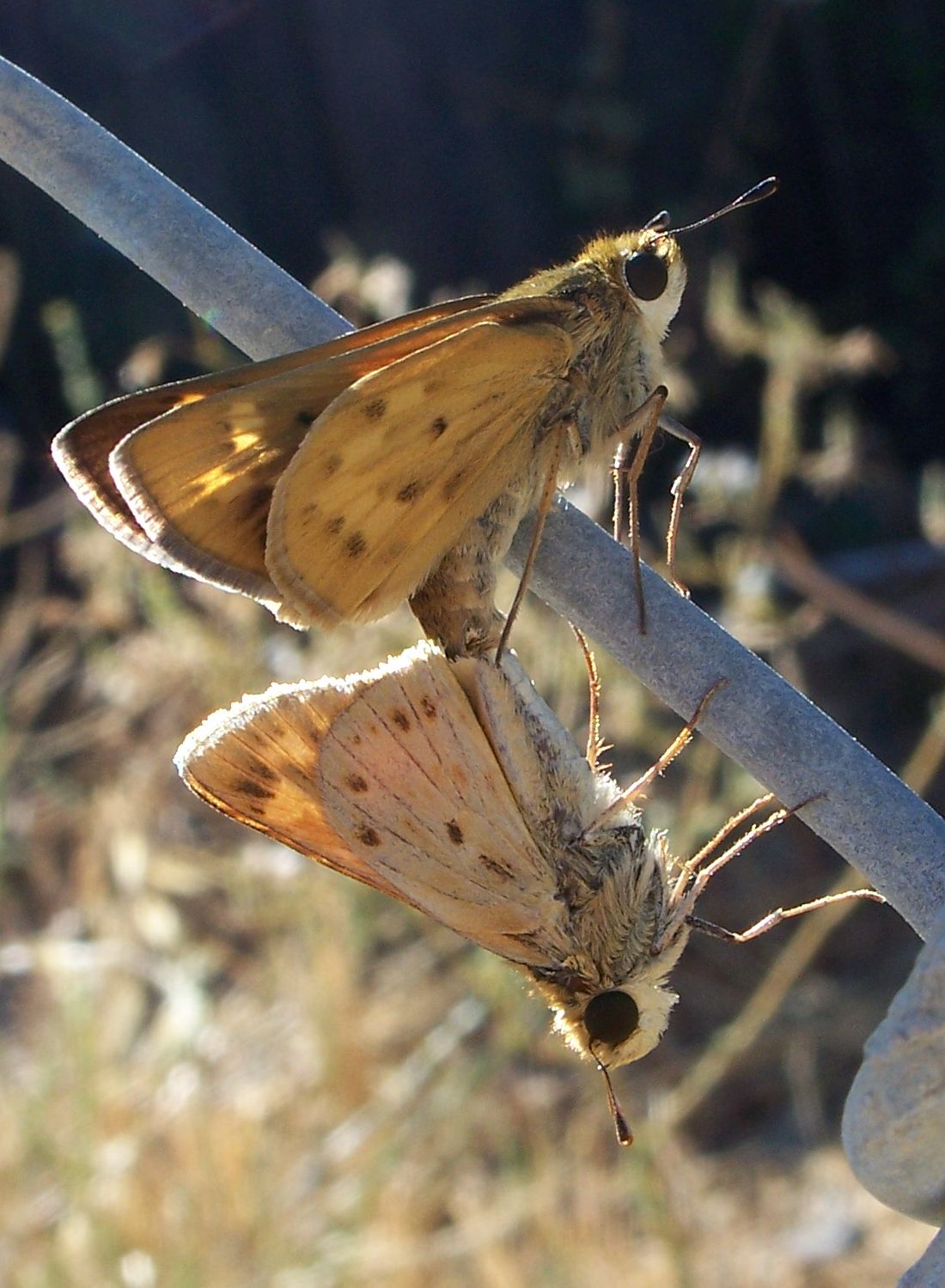
Mating, female on top

Fiery skipper on lantana

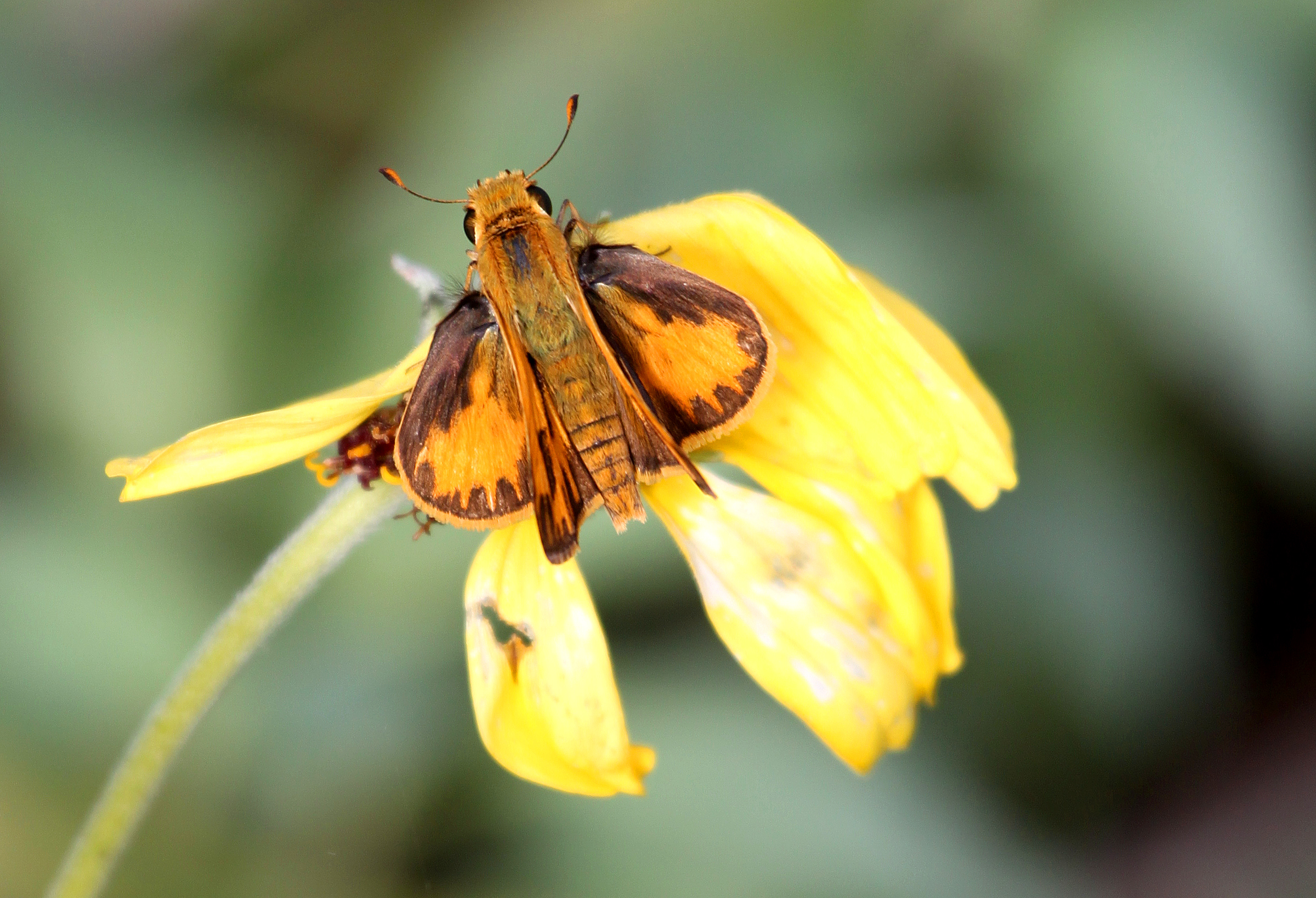
Fiery skipper on bush sunflower

== Reproduction and life cycle ==
When looking for a mate, male skippers will perch on nearby grass or plants and wait for a female to approach the vicinity. Males will often seek out areas with the highest likelihood of finding virgin females which often leads them to patches near or at sites of hatching. Courtship is described as brief and often disrupted by the presence and competition of rival males. Once a successful mating has occurred, female fiery skippers will deposit eggs one at a time in different locations. These eggs are typically small and a translucent white in color but turn pale blue in the first few days. Studies looking at the reproductive cycle of the fiery skipper reveal a mean developmental time of 23.4 to 23.5 days during which the fiery skipper transformed from an egg into an adult at 27.5–29 °C (81.5–84.2 °F). Once hatched, larvae are initially green but later become more dull and grey. Larvae at this stage are most notably characterized by a black head and constricted neck with mature individuals reaching up to 25 mm (1 in) in length. The pupal stage for males and females is roughly the same amount of time during which a pupa will change from green to light brown in coloration. Mating will occur shortly following emergence from the pupa with an average life span ranging from 6 to 11 days. The reproductive habits of fiery skippers have been extensively studied by Irene Shapiro with experiments conducted at the University of California Davis during the months of July to October 1974. The development of the fiery skipper was studied in laboratory cultures and has proven helpful in understanding the life cycle of this species.

== Invasiveness and status as pests ==
The larval stage of the fiery skipper is known to damage turfgrass, something that has become a problem in the states of California and Hawaii. Turfgrass is a term used to refer to grass blades that are tightly associated with one another by roots, leaves, and stems, and grown for a variety of reasons including aesthetics, density, and consistency. Other butterflies of the family Hesperiidae may be considered as pests to other plant systems such as bananas and palms.

In 1970, fiery skippers were first discovered in Hawaii and have since populated all islands but Lanai. Following its discovery on the island of Oahu, the fiery skipper has become known as an invasive species with primary concerns centered around larval consumption of turfgrass.

Treatment of turfgrass with the use of insecticides is recommended if the number of fiery skipper larvae is found to be 15 after surveying a plot. A 1959 article in Southern California Turfgrass Culture identified fiery skipper larvae commonly occurring on and causing damage to bentgrass and suggested the use of aldrin, dieldrin, or heptachlor sprays as insecticides. A mixture of either 0.0015% pyrethrins or 0.25% detergent with 4L of water may also be used to survey the number of fiery skipper larvae present within a given patch. The technique works best in 1,860 cm^{2} (288 sq in) circular patches. Surveying should occur within 5 to 10 minutes of application with roughly 90–100% of larval populations present.
