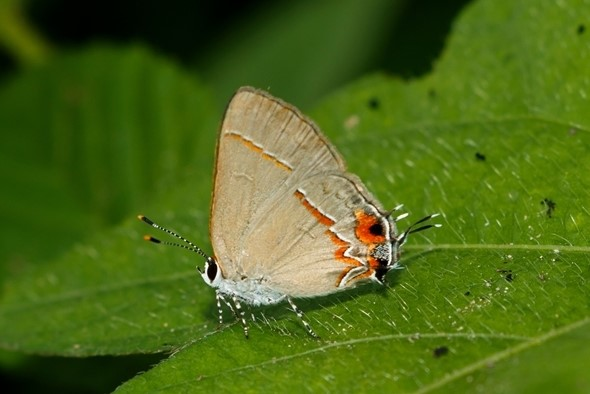

Scientific classification
- Domain: Eukaryota
- Kingdom: Animalia
- Phylum: Arthropoda
- Class: Insecta
- Order: Lepidoptera
- Family: Lycaenidae
- Genus: Electrostrymon
- Species: E. joya

Binomial name
- Electrostrymon joya (Dognin, 1895)

Synonyms
- Thecla joya Dognin, 1895; Thecla canus H. H. Druce, 1907; Thecla nubes H. H. Druce, 1907; Thecla callao H. H. Druce, 1907; Thecla rugatus H. H. Druce, 1907; Thecla bunnirae Dyar, 1918; Tergissima shargeli K. Johnson, [1990]

= Electrostrymon joya =

Species of butterfly

Electrostrymon joya, the muted hairstreak, is a butterfly of the family Lycaenidae. It was described by Paul Dognin in 1895. It is found from southern Texas and Mexico to Ecuador, Peru and Tobago, as well as on the Netherlands Antilles. The habitat consists of openings and edges in tropical semideciduous river forests and second growth.

The wingspan is 24–30 mm. Adults are on wing from April to January in the tropics. There are three or more generations per year. They feed on flower nectar.

The larvae feed on the flowers of Mangifera indica and Psiguria racemosa.
