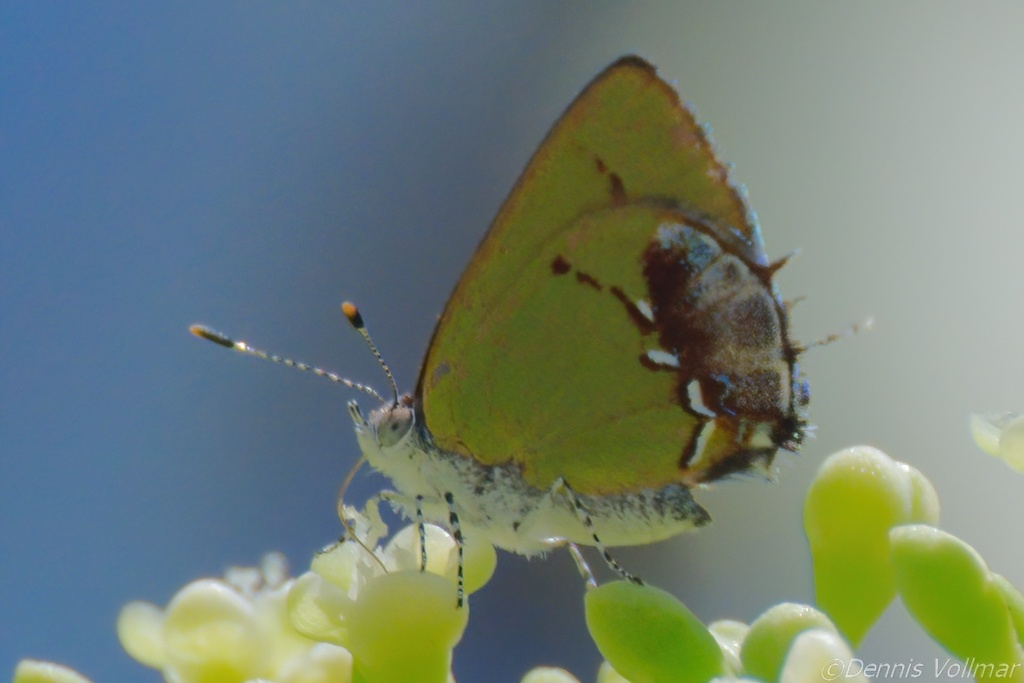

Conservation status
- Vulnerable (NatureServe)

Scientific classification
- Domain: Eukaryota
- Kingdom: Animalia
- Phylum: Arthropoda
- Class: Insecta
- Order: Lepidoptera
- Family: Lycaenidae
- Genus: Chlorostrymon
- Species: C. maesites

Binomial name
- Chlorostrymon maesites (Herrich-Schäffer, 1864)

= Chlorostrymon maesites =

Species of butterfly

Chlorostrymon maesites, known generally as amethyst hairstreak, is a species of hairstreak in the butterfly family Lycaenidae. Other common names include the maesites hairstreak and verde azul hairstreak.

The MONA or Hodges number for Chlorostrymon maesites is 4271.
