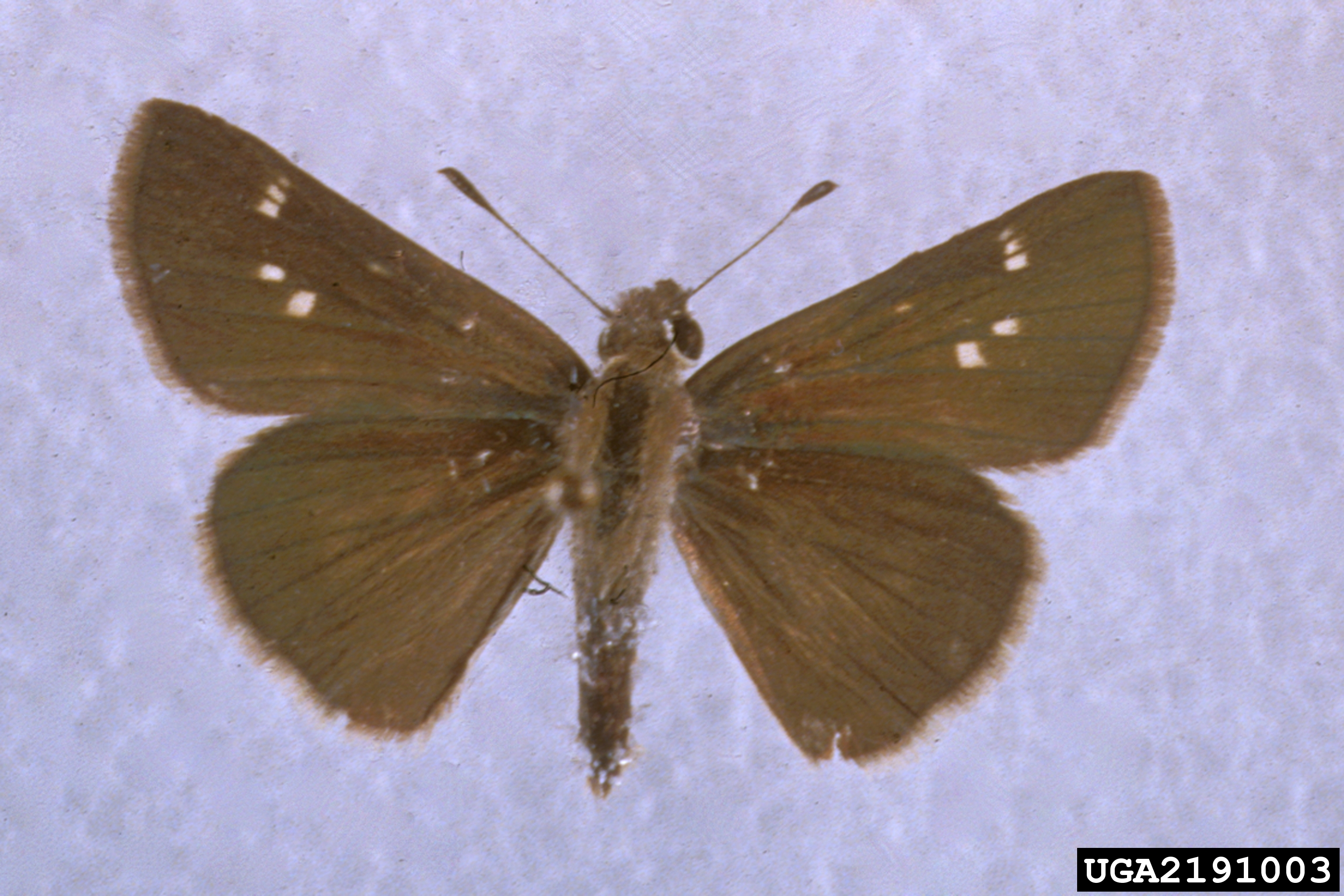

Conservation status
- Secure (NatureServe)

Scientific classification
- Kingdom: Animalia
- Phylum: Arthropoda
- Class: Insecta
- Order: Lepidoptera
- Family: Hesperiidae
- Genus: Lerodea
- Species: L. eufala

Binomial name
- Lerodea eufala (Edwards, 1869)

Synonyms
- Hesperia eufala Edwards, 1869; Euphyes eufala Dyar, 1903; Goniloba dispersa Herrich-Schäffer, 1869; Pamphila floridae Mabille, 1876; Carystus micylla Burmeister, 1878; Lerodea eufala floridae var. obscura Lindsey et al., 1931 (nom. nud.); Hesperia fusca Reed, 1877 (preocc. Grote & Robinson, 1869); Lerodea reedi Hayward, [1940]

= Lerodea eufala =

Species of butterfly

Lerodea eufala, the Eufala skipper or rice leaffolder, is a species of butterfly in the family Hesperiidae. It is found from the coast of Georgia, south through Florida and west across the southern United States to southern California, south through Mexico and Central America to Patagonia. In the summer, it expands its range north to central California, North Dakota, southern Wisconsin, northern Michigan and Washington, D.C.

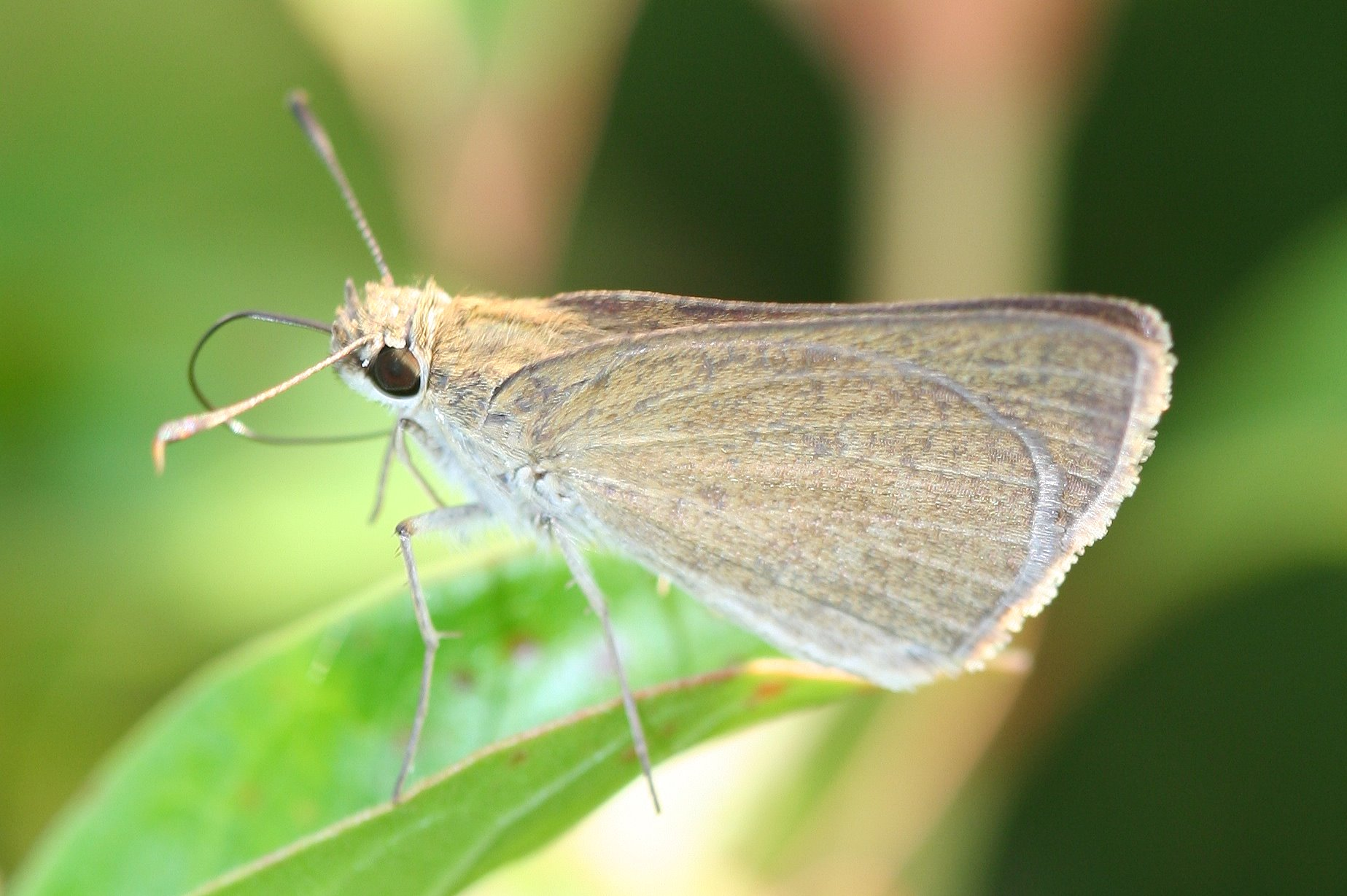

The wingspan is 25–32 mm. There are two generations, with adults on wing from February to October in the deep south. There are multiple generations throughout the year in Florida, southern Texas and Arizona.

The larvae feed on various grasses including Sorghum halepense, Cynodon dactylon and Saccharum officinarum. Adults feed on the nectar from various flowers including croton, alfalfa, composites and lippia.

== Subspecies ==
- Lerodea eufala eufala
- Lerodea eufala concepcionis - Chile
