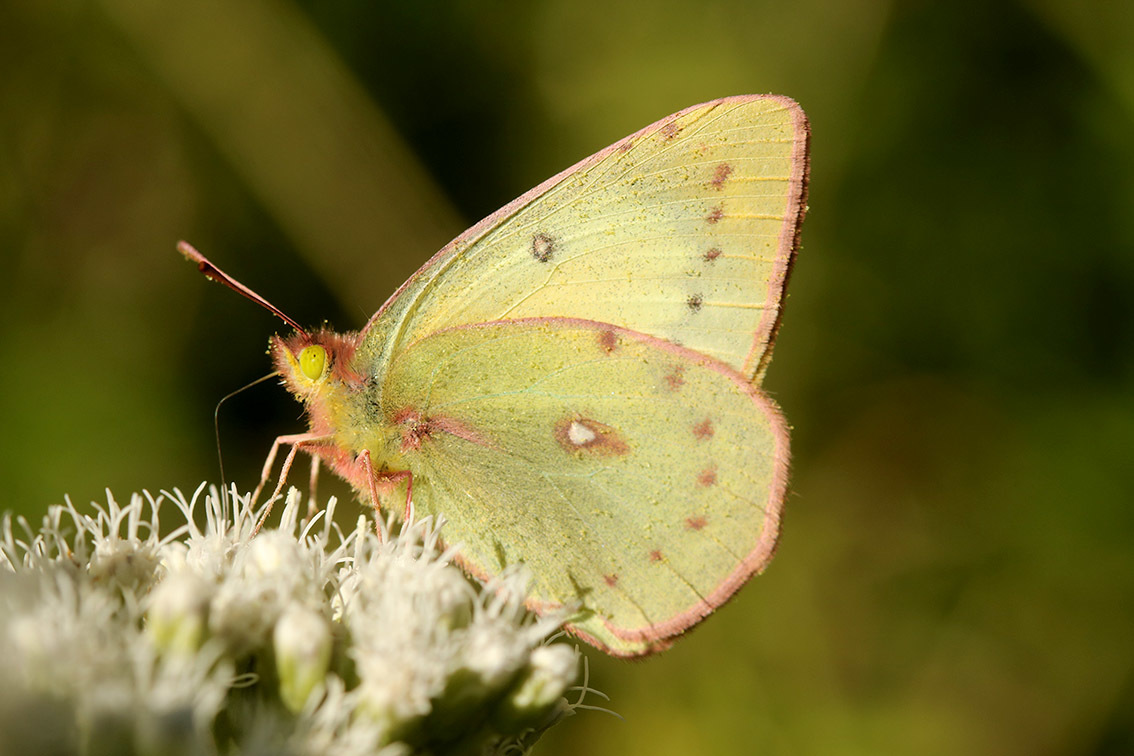

Scientific classification
- Domain: Eukaryota
- Kingdom: Animalia
- Phylum: Arthropoda
- Class: Insecta
- Order: Lepidoptera
- Family: Pieridae
- Genus: Colias
- Species: C. lesbia

Binomial name
- Colias lesbia (Fabricius, 1775)

Synonyms
- List: Colotis pyrrhothea Hübner, 1823; Colias pyrrhothea var. heliceoides Capronnier, 1874; Colias aquilo Austaut, 1912; Colias aquilo f. obscura Köhler, 1923; Colias aquilo f. micans Köhler, 1923; Colias aquilo f. flaveola Köhler, 1923 (preocc.); Colias aquilo f. maculata Köhler, 1923; Colias lesbia eurinice Martin, [1923]; Colias aquilo ab. rufa Köhler, 1928; Colias aquilo ab. citrina Breyer, 1930; Colias aquilo ab. privata Breyer, 1939; Colias aquilo ab. angustimargo Breyer, 1939; Colias aquilo ab. koehleri Breyer, 1939; Colias aquilo ab. nigromarginata Breyer, 1939; Colias aquilo ab. punctata Breyer, 1939; Colias aquilo ab. citronigra Breyer, 1939; Colias lesbia pyrrhothea ab. almeidai Biezanko, 1949; Colias lesbia pyrrhothea f. heliceoides ab. lutzi Biezanko, 1949; Colias lesbia pyrrhothea f. heliceoides ab. travassosi Biezanko, 1949; Colias lesbia pyrrhothea ab. strandi Biezanko, 1949; Colias lesbia pyrrhothea ab. costa-limai Biezanko, 1949; Colias lesbia pyrrhothea f. heliceoides ab. schweizeri Biezanko, 1949; Colias lesbia pyrrhothea ab. williamsi Biezanko, 1949; Colias lesbia pyrrhothea ab. forbesi Biezanko, 1949; Colias lesbia var. andina Staudinger, 1894; Colias dinora Kirby, 1881; Colias lesbia meieri Berger, 1983; Colias lesbia roberti Salazar, 2002; Colias rutilans Boisduval, 1836; Colias cunninghami Butler, 1881; Colias minuscula Butler, 1881; Colias lesbia var. (ab.) antarctica Staudinger, 1899; Colias lesbia var. arena Staudinger, 1899; Colias vautieri [sic] ab. micans Breyer, 1939; Colias vauthierii ljungneri Bryk, 1944; Colias verhulsti Berger, 1983; Colias verhulsti f. aurantiaca Berger, 1983

= Colias lesbia =

Species of butterfly

Colias lesbia is a species of butterfly in the family Pieridae. It is found in the Neotropical realm.

== Description ==
Specimens from south Brazil, Uruguay and Argentina differ so little that they cannot be separated. This form is in the male dark orange yellow, specimens with violet reflections are not rare; the black-brown distal margin is not sharply defined proximally. The under surface with the exception of the reddish middle of the forewing is vivid yellow with the usual Colias marking. The ground colour of the upper surface in the females is very variable: orange yellow, yellow, yellowish or white with grey dusting; greenish-grey specimens also occur.

== Biology ==
Flies from November to January.

== Taxonomy ==
It was accepted as a species by Josef Grieshuber and Gerardo Lamas.

=== Subspecies ===
- C. l. lesbia (Tierra del Fuego, Argentina, Brazil (Rio Grande do Sul), Uruguay)
- C. l. andina Staudinger, 1894 (Bolivia) from 3000–4000 metres asl, sprinkled with blackish
- C. l. dinora Kirby, 1881 (Ecuador, Colombia) 4000 —5,500 metres asl orange-yellow, with washed-out, moderately broad dark distal margin to the forewing; the hindwing has a submarginal row of small, dark, inconspicuous spots. The under surface on the forewing is somewhat lighter, on the hindwing somewhat darker than the upper, the median spot is white, small and margined with reddish. The female has lemon-yellow ground colour and yellow spots in the dark distal margin of the forewing.
- C. l. mineira Zikán, 1940 (Brazil (Minas Gerais))
- C. l. vauthierii Guérin-Méneville, [1830] (Chile, Argentina) is in the male above orange red with broad black-brown margin and median spot of the same colour on the forewing, the black-brown margin of the hindwing is much narrower and is suddenly reduced towards the inner angle; the hindwing has a smaller, indistinct dark median spot. The under surface of the forewing is orange red, at the margins and particularly at the apex yellowish, and has a black median spot and a submarginal row of black spots, which are larger posteriorly. The under surface of the hindwing is yellow, slightly orange in the middle, the reddish median spot has a light centre, a reddish diffuse spot is placed at the base of the wing and in addition there is a row of small reddish submarginal spots; the inner margin is greenish. The female has above yellowish white ground colour, broader dark distal margins on both wings and light submarginal spots. The ground colour of the underside of the forewing is impure white, of the hindwing yellowish.
- C. l. verhulsti Berger, 1983 (Peru)
