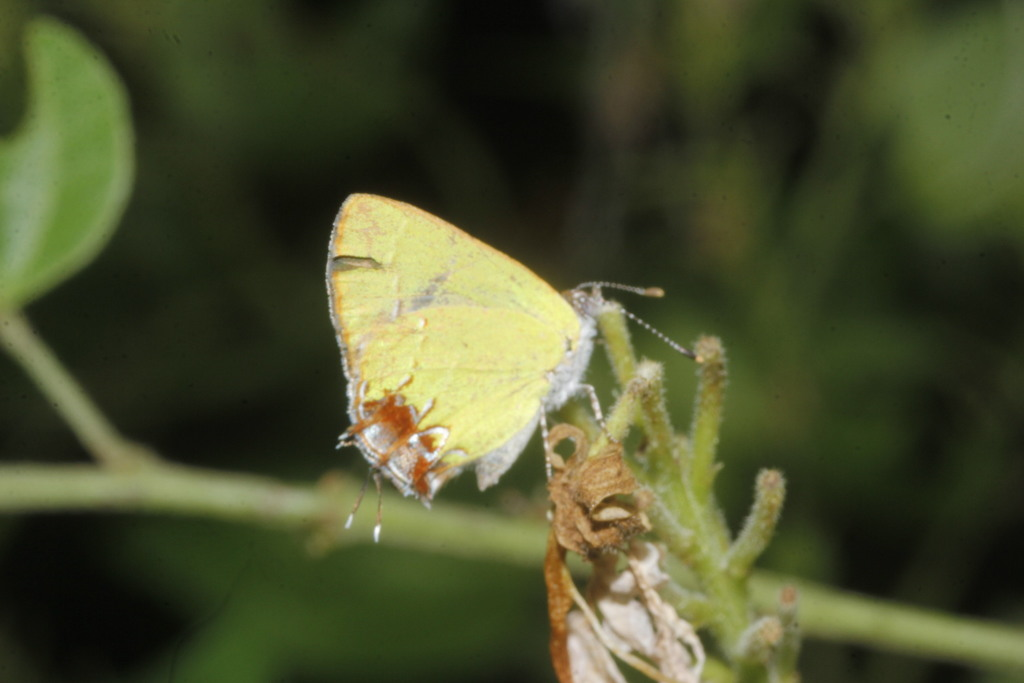

Scientific classification
- Domain: Eukaryota
- Kingdom: Animalia
- Phylum: Arthropoda
- Class: Insecta
- Order: Lepidoptera
- Family: Lycaenidae
- Genus: Chlorostrymon
- Species: C. telea

Binomial name
- Chlorostrymon telea (Hewitson, 1868)

Synonyms
- Thecla telea Hewitson, 1868; Strymon telea; Chalybs telea; Eupsyche telea; Thecla maesites telea; Chlorostyrom patagonia Johnson, 1989; Chlorostrymon larancagua Johnson, 1990

= Chlorostrymon telea =

Species of butterfly

Chlorostrymon telea, the telea hairstreak, is a butterfly of the family Lycaenidae. It was described by William Chapman Hewitsonin 1868. It is found from southern Texas and Mexico to Colombia, Uruguay, Paraguay, eastern Bolivia, Argentina and Chile. The habitat consists of stream valleys of semideciduous dry forests.

The wingspan is 16–22 mm. Adults are on wing in June in southern Texas and from January to July in Central America. They feed on flower nectar.

The larvae feed on the flowers of Guazuma species and Central American soapberry.
