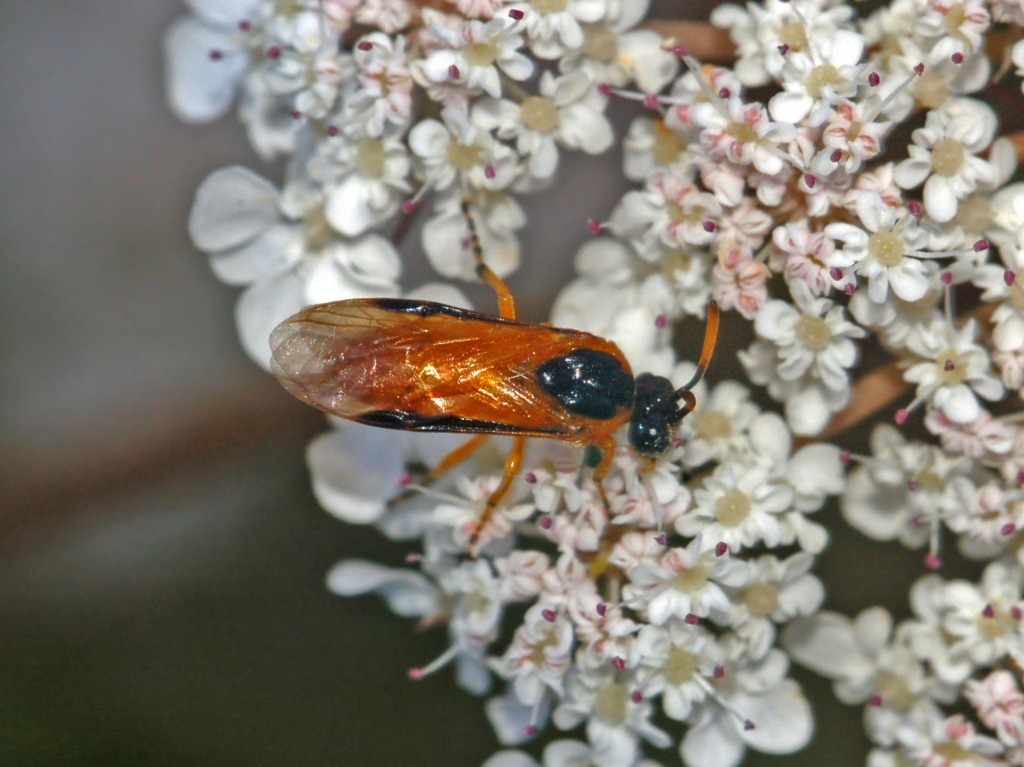
- Arge ochropus, dorsal view

Scientific classification
- Domain: Eukaryota
- Kingdom: Animalia
- Phylum: Arthropoda
- Class: Insecta
- Order: Hymenoptera
- Suborder: Symphyta
- Family: Argidae
- Genus: Arge
- Species: A. ochropus

Binomial name
- Arge ochropus (Gmelin in Linnaeus, 1790)

Synonyms
- Arge rosae (Linnaeus) auctorum

= Arge ochropus =

Species of sawfly

Arge ochropus, the rose sawfly, is a species belonging to the family Argidae subfamily Arginae.

== Description ==
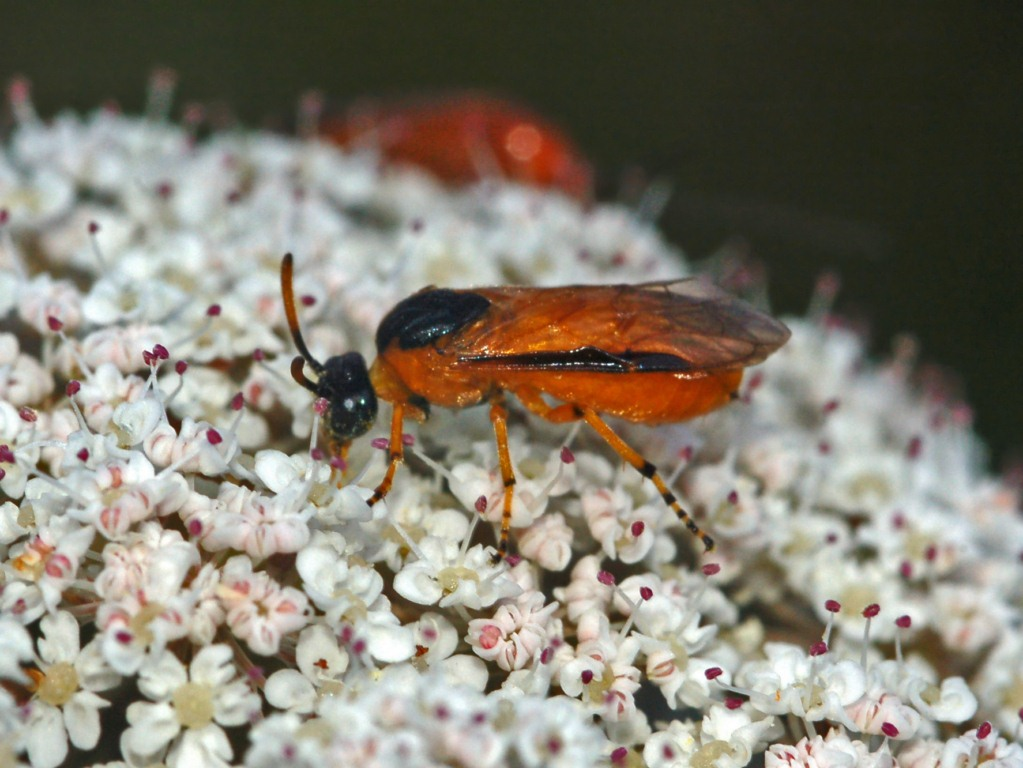
Arge ochropus – lateral view

The adults grow up to 7–10 millimetres (0.28–0.39 in) long and can be encountered from April to May. The head and thorax are black, while the abdomen and wings are reddish orange. The larvae are yellow and bristly with black markings.

This species is very similar to Athalia rosae (Tenthredinidae), but in Arge ochropus the antennae are composed of three sections, the third of which is greatly elongated, while in Athalia rosae the antennae are composed of 10–11 items. Arge pagana is mainly black above.

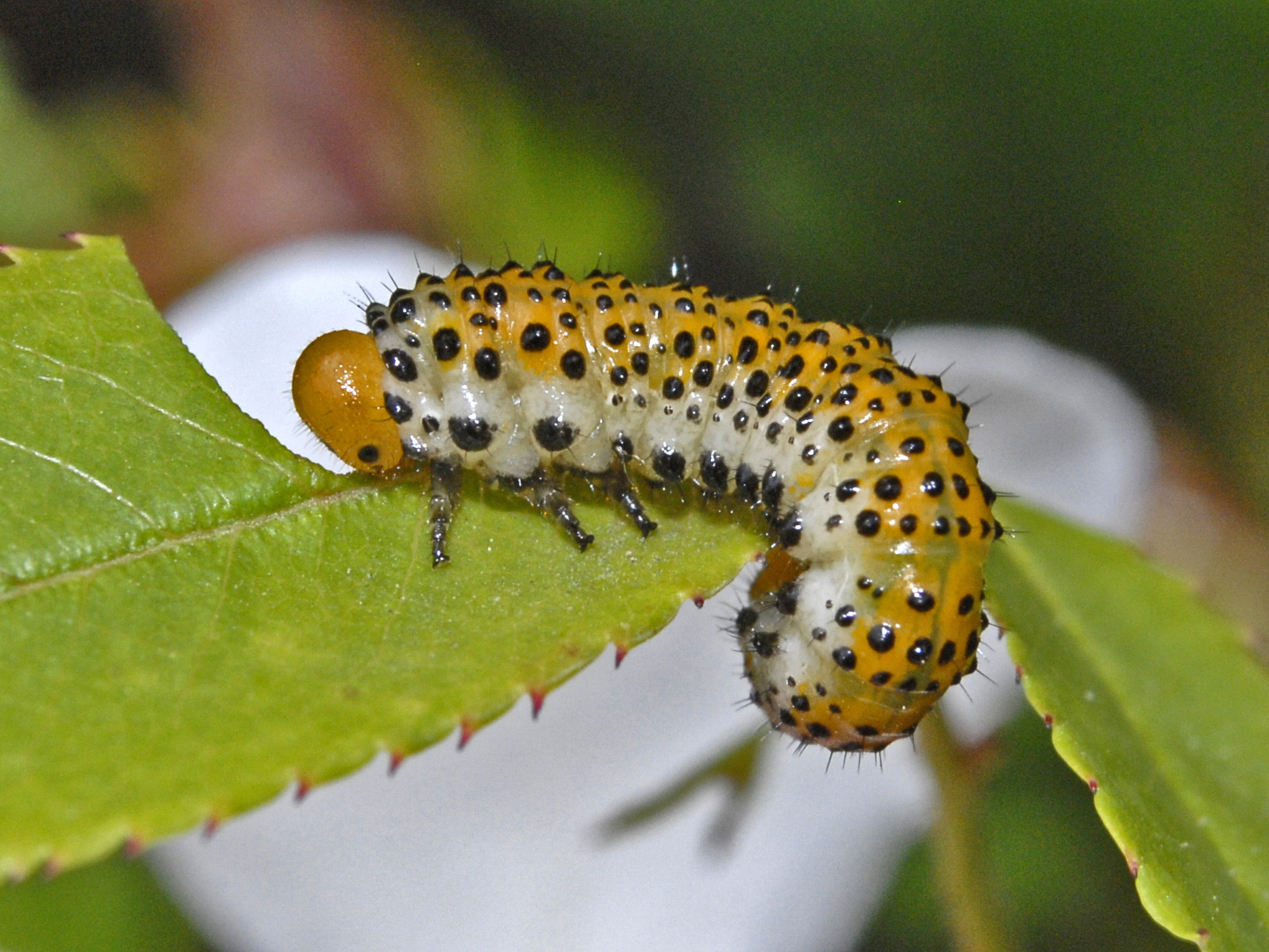
Larva of Arge ochropus

== Distribution ==
This sawfly is present in Europe, Asia Minor, the Caucasus, Turkmenistan, Northern Iran and Western Siberia up to Lake Baikal. It has been introduced to the northeastern United States and Eastern Canada.

== Ecology ==
Adults feed of nectar and pollen on Tanacetum vulgare, Angelica sylvestris and Heracleum sphondylium. This species has two generations a year. The females lay about 16–18 eggs on the rose stems. Larvae feed on the leaves of some species of the genus Rosa, for example Rosa canina, Rosa majalis and Rosa pimpinellifolia.
