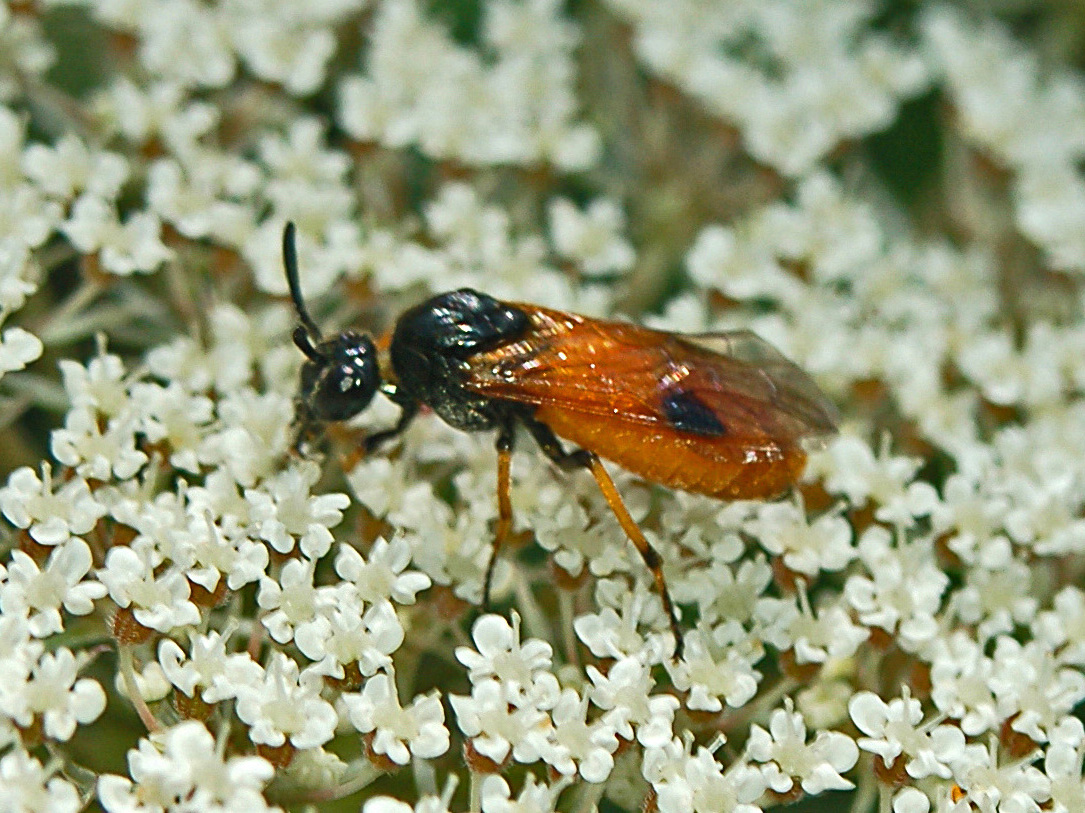
- Arge melanochroa feeding on Laserpitium latifolium

Scientific classification
- Kingdom: Animalia
- Phylum: Arthropoda
- Clade: Pancrustacea
- Class: Insecta
- Order: Hymenoptera
- Suborder: Symphyta
- Family: Argidae
- Genus: Arge
- Species: A. melanochroa

Binomial name
- Arge melanochroa (Gmelin 1790)

= Arge melanochroa =

Species of sawfly

Arge melanochroa is a species of the family Argidae, subfamily Arginae.

== Description ==
The adults grow up to 7–8 millimetres (0.28–0.31 in) long and can be encountered from May to July. The head, the antennae and the thorax are black, while the abdomen is reddish orange. Femurs are black and tibiae are yellow.

This species is very similar to Arge cyanocrocea, but in A. melanochroa the front wings have just a dark spot in proximity of the stigma, while the distal half (the apex) of the wings is transparent. This sawfly can also be confused with Athalia rosae (Tenthredinidae), but in Arge melanochroa the antennae are composed of three sections, the third of which is greatly elongated, while in Athalia rosae the antennae are composed of 10–11 items.

== Distribution ==
This sawfly is present in Europe.

== Ecology ==
Adult feed on nectar and pollen of Apiaceae (mainly Heracleum sphondylium and Laserpitium latifolium), while larvae feed on Crataegus species.
