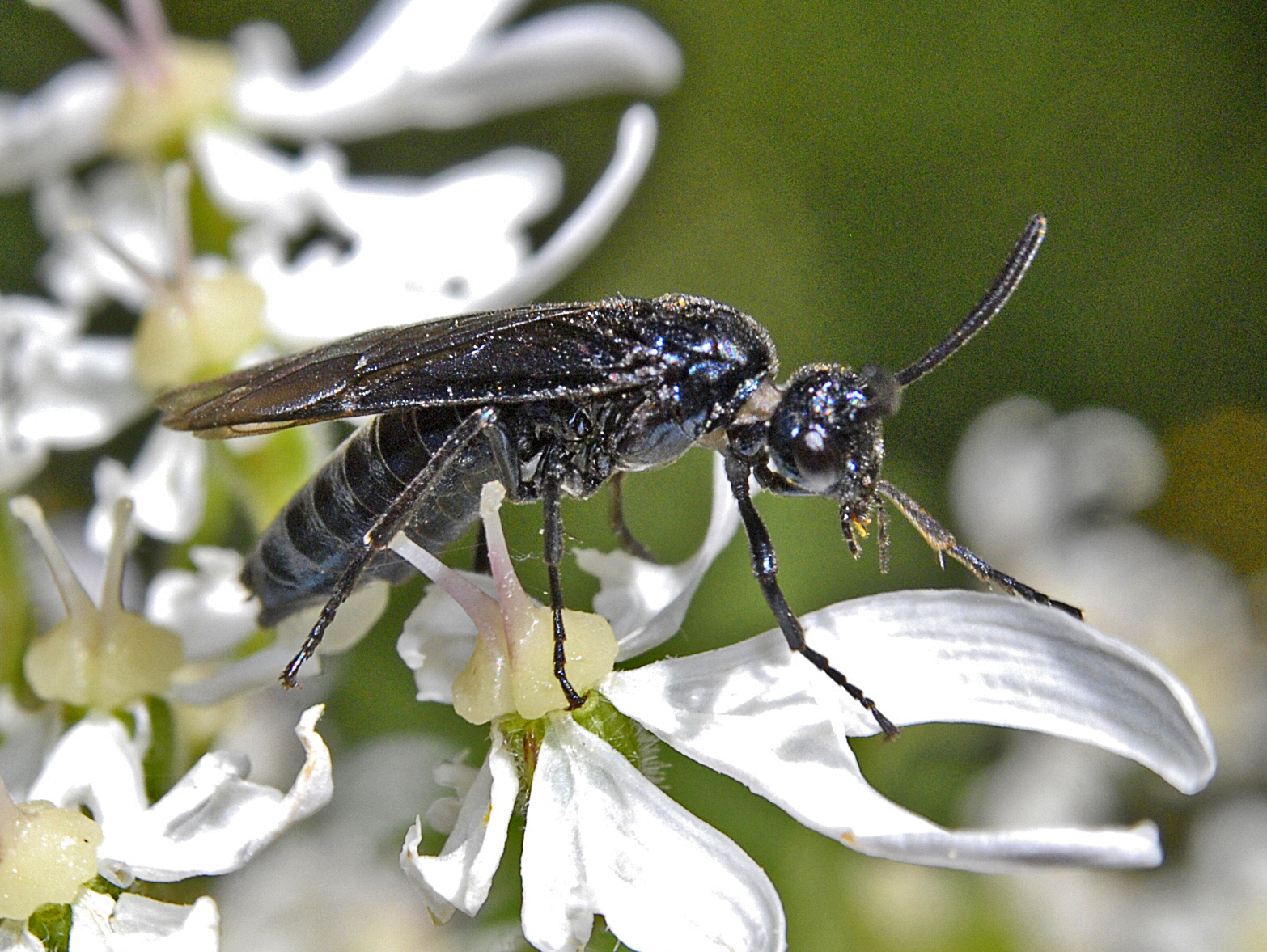

Scientific classification
- Domain: Eukaryota
- Kingdom: Animalia
- Phylum: Arthropoda
- Class: Insecta
- Order: Hymenoptera
- Suborder: Symphyta
- Family: Argidae
- Genus: Arge
- Species: A. berberidis

Binomial name
- Arge berberidis Schrank, 1802

= Arge berberidis =

Berberis sawfly

Species of sawfly

Arge berberidis, common name berberis sawfly, is a species of sawflies belonging to the family Argidae subfamily Arginae.

== Description ==
Arge berberidis can reach a length of about 9.2 millimetres (0.36 in). Adults have bluish-black head and body. Wings are brown. This species has saws-sheath shaped tong. Larvae show black head and a greyish body with many small black spots and some yellowish blotches.

== Biology ==
Larvae are considered a severe pest causing defoliation in the host plants (Mahonia and Berberis). Adults fly from June to August.

== Distribution ==
This sawfly is present in most of Europe (Austria, Belgium, Bulgaria, Switzerland, Czech Republic, Germany, Danish mainland, Spanish mainland, France, Greek mainland, Hungary, Italy, Macedonia, The Nederlands, Poland, Romania, European Russia, Slovakia, Ukraine, United Kingdom).

== Habitat ==
These sawflies can be found on Mahonia and Berberis species.
