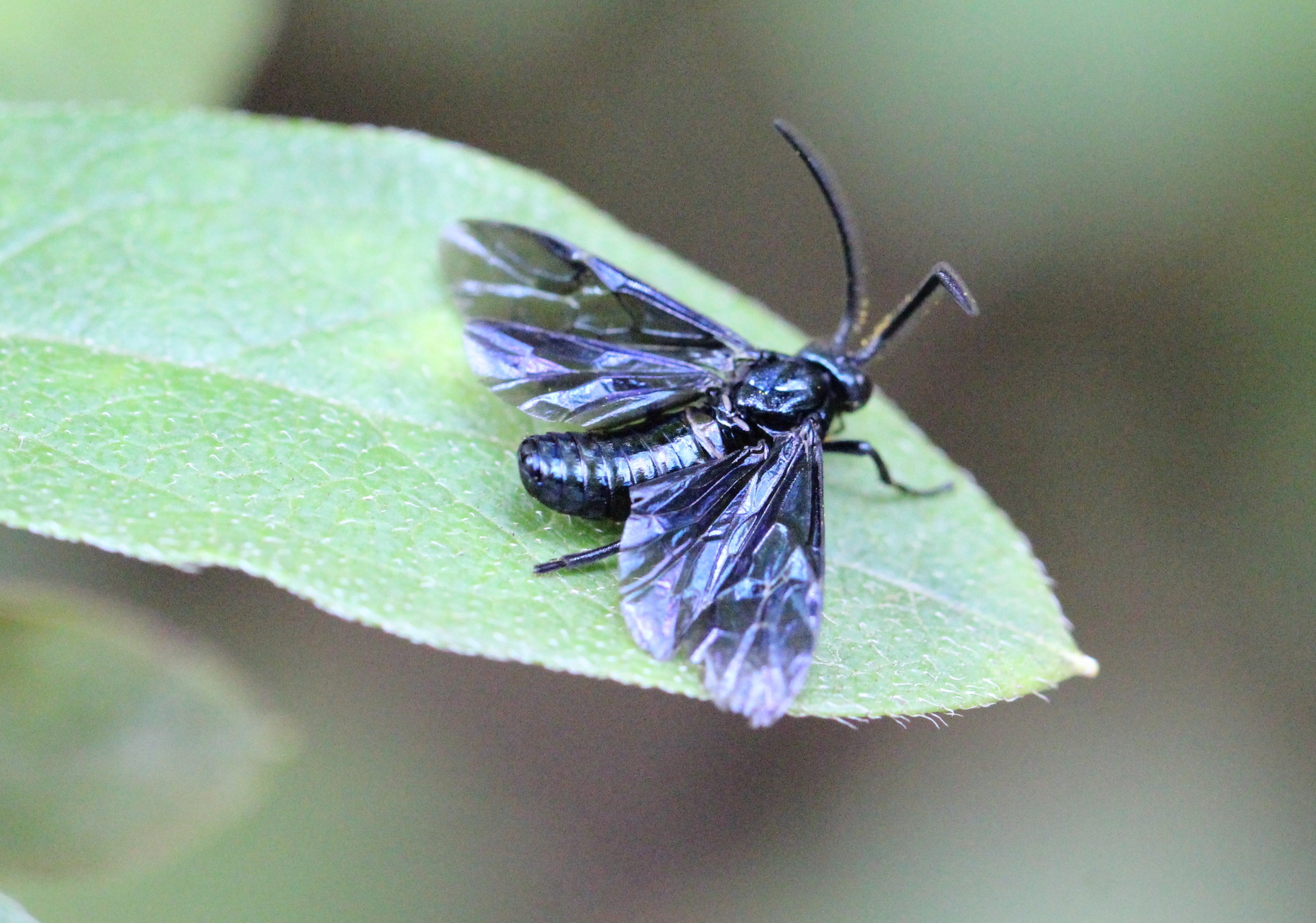
- Adult
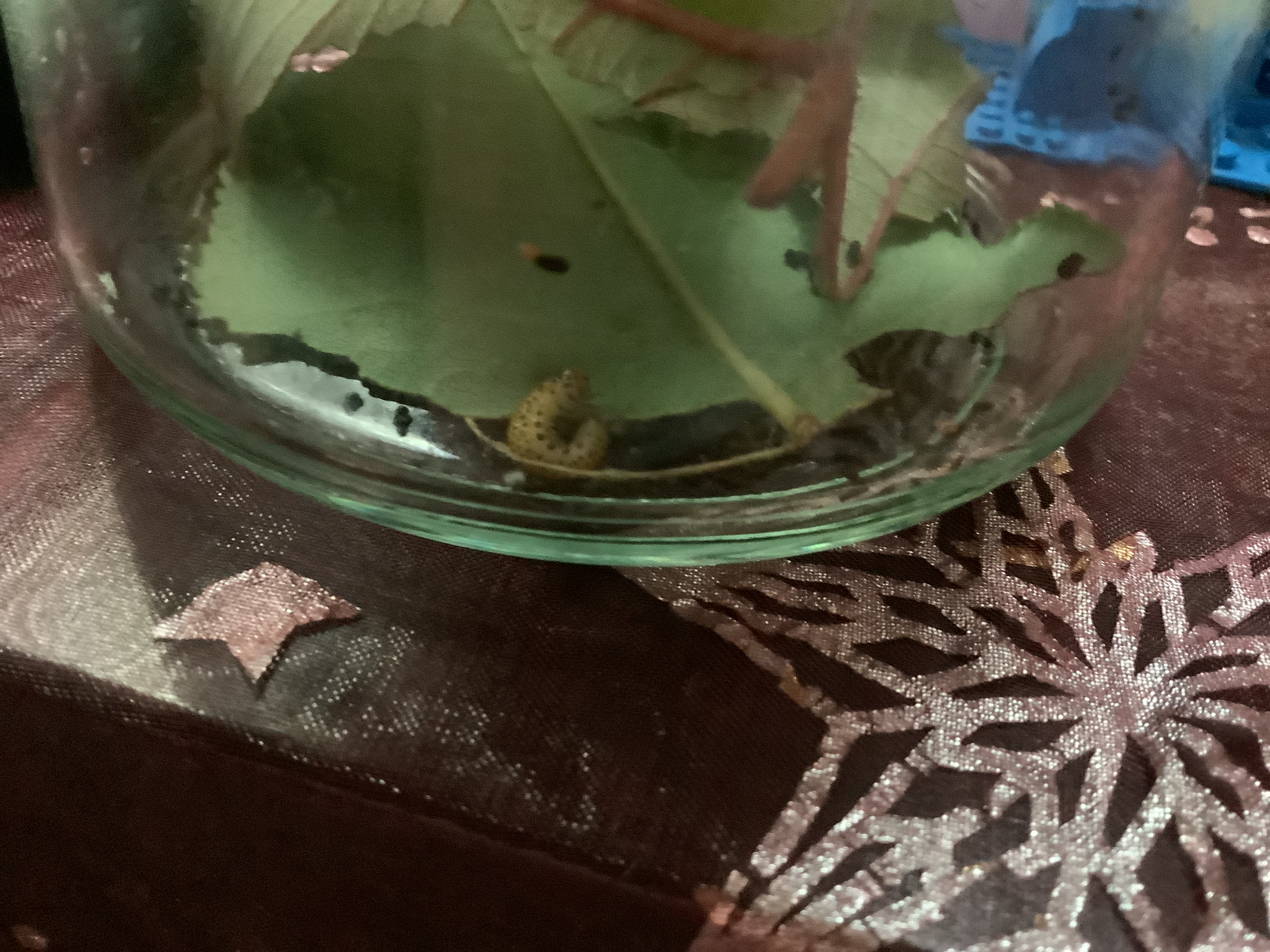
- Larvae

Scientific classification
- Kingdom: Animalia
- Phylum: Arthropoda
- Clade: Pancrustacea
- Class: Insecta
- Order: Hymenoptera
- Suborder: Symphyta
- Family: Argidae
- Genus: Arge
- Species: A. similis

Binomial name
- Arge similis (Vollenhoven, 1860)

= Arge similis =

Species of insect

Arge similis, common name azalea argid sawfly, is an insect species from the family Argidae. The species was originally described by Samuel Constantinus Snellen van Vollenhoven.

== Anatomy ==
A. similis is a solitary and phytophagous sawfly. This stale-blue sawfly has a length about 10 millimetres, with a hairy head. It has a dark-blue colour and its head is covered with short hair. Its face has two grooves on both sides, with a protruding comb in between. This comb divides in two at the end. The wings are brownish black, with blueish-black veins. The wings are without dots, which distinguishes it from its look-a-like, Cibdela janthina.

The species was described from four female samples which are part of the collection of the Natural History Museum, Leiden and collected by Philipp Franz von Siebold in Japan.
