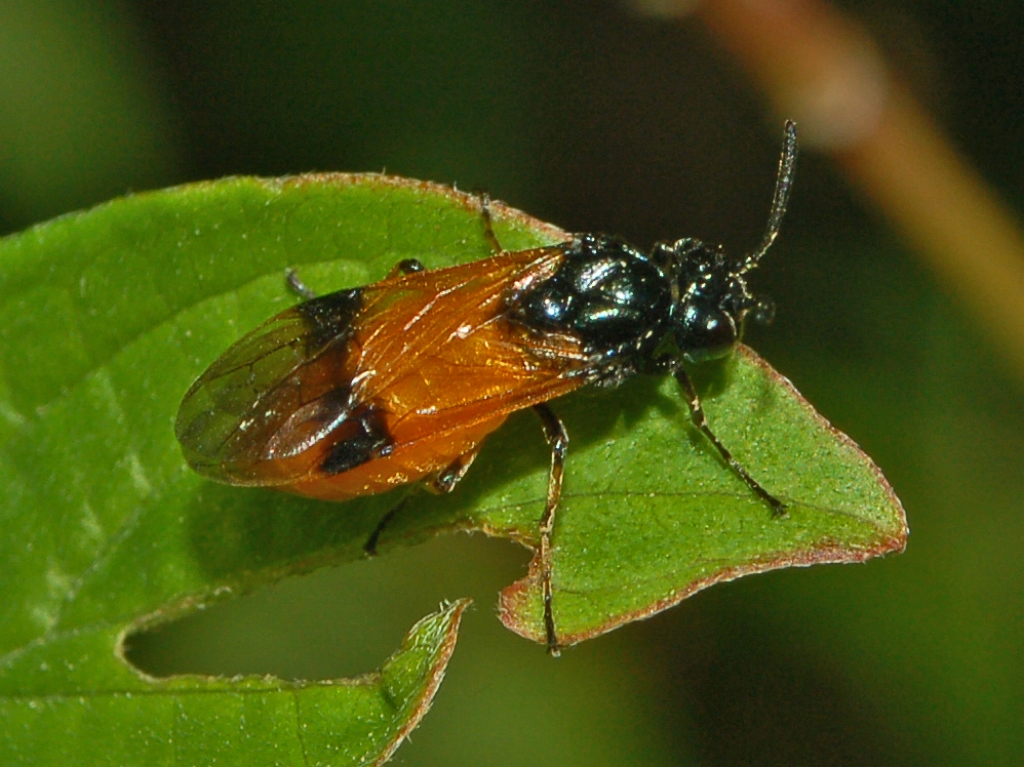
- Arge cyanocrocea. Dorsal view
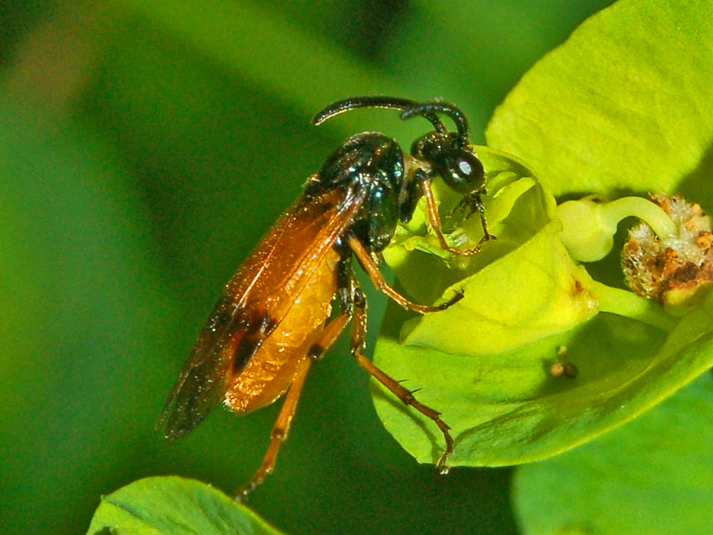
- Side view

Scientific classification
- Kingdom: Animalia
- Phylum: Arthropoda
- Clade: Pancrustacea
- Class: Insecta
- Order: Hymenoptera
- Suborder: Symphyta
- Family: Argidae
- Genus: Arge
- Species: A. cyanocrocea

Binomial name
- Arge cyanocrocea (Förster, 1771)

= Arge cyanocrocea =

Species of sawfly

Arge cyanocrocea, the bramble sawfly, is a species of sawflies of the family Argidae, subfamily Arginae.

== Distribution ==
These sawflies are present in most of Europe, in the Caucasus, in Asia Minor and in Japan.

== Description ==
The adults of Arge cyanocrocea grow up to 7–8 millimetres (0.28–0.31 in) long. As all sawflies, this species is related to wasps and not to flies, but lacks the typical wasp waist. Its head and thorax are black, while the abdomen is yellowish orange. Legs are reddish, with small black rings. The wings show a characteristic wide transverse dark band and gray apex. Arge cyanocrocea is rather similar to Arge pagana, that shows black wings.

== Biology ==
These sawflies can be encountered from May to July, feeding on pollen and nectar of several Apiaceae species (Aegopodium podagraria, Meum athamanticum, Heracleum sphondylium, etc.), Euphorbiaceae species (Euphorbia spp.) and Asteraceae species (Tanacetum vulgare).

The larvae of this species look like caterpillars, but they have five pairs of prolegs, while caterpillars have four pairs. They feed on the leaves of brambles (hence the common name), mainly blackberry (Rubus fruticosus), raspberry (Rubus idaeus) and great burnet (Sanguisorba officinalis).

== Gallery ==
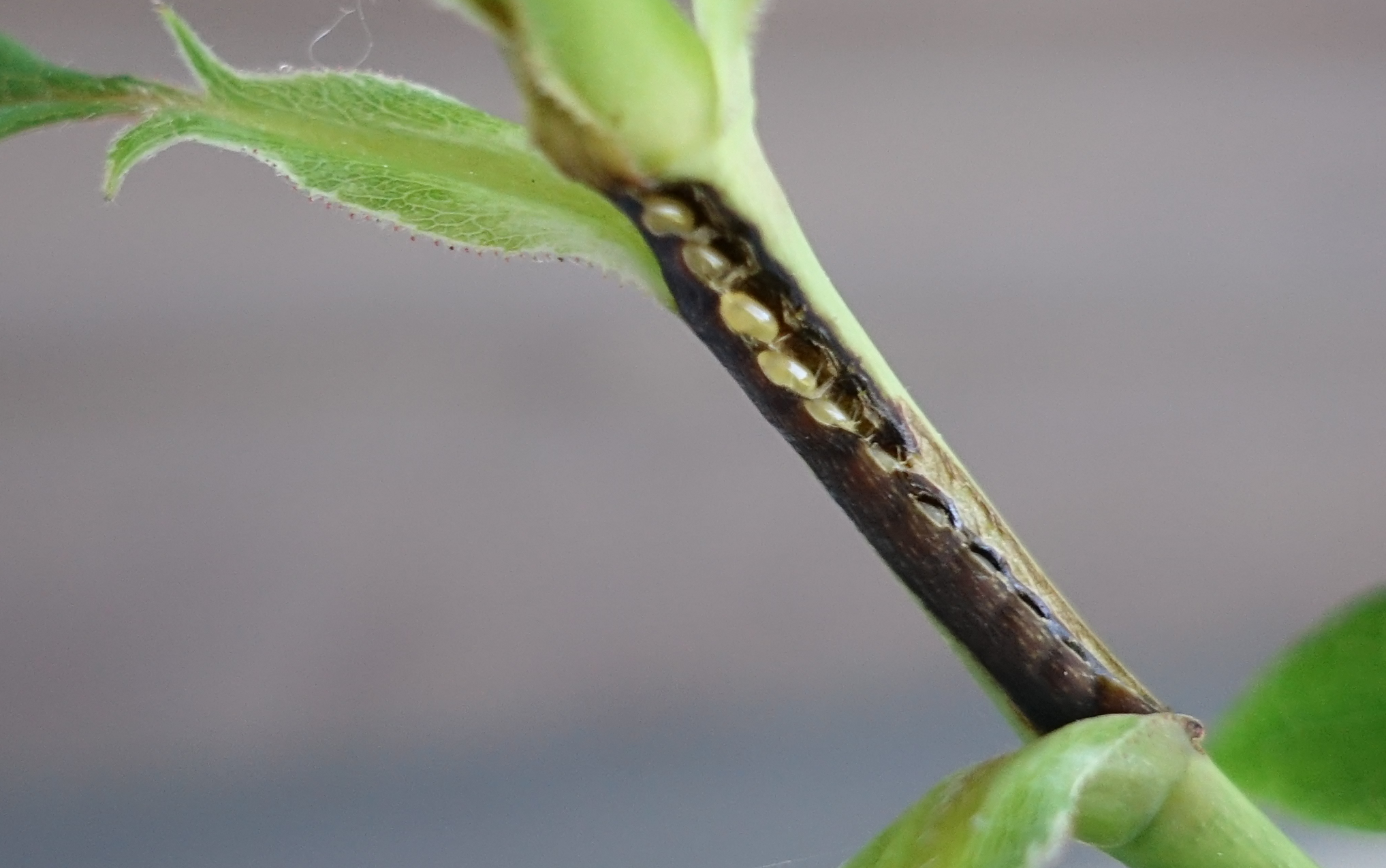
Arge cyanocrocea. Eggs

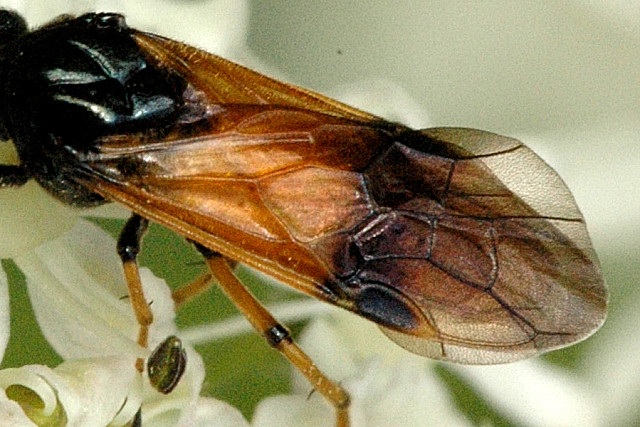
Detail of wings

Arge cyanocrocea. Video clip
