= Antargidium atriceps =

Scientific classification
- Domain: Eukaryota
- Kingdom: Animalia
- Phylum: Arthropoda
- Class: Insecta
- Order: Hymenoptera
- Suborder: Symphyta
- Family: Argidae
- Genus: Antargidium
- Species: A. atriceps

Binomial name
- Antargidium atriceps Benson, 1935

Species of insect

Antargidium atriceps is a species of sawfly belonging to the family Argidae. It is found in Queensland, and its host is Arytera distylis.
