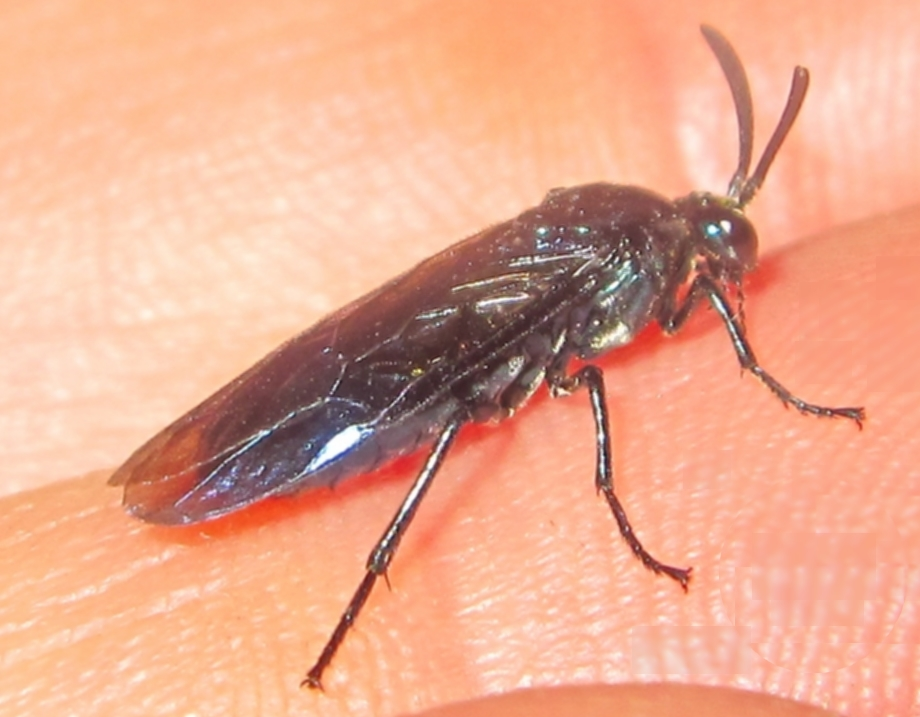
- Cibdela janthina

Scientific classification
- Domain: Eukaryota
- Kingdom: Animalia
- Phylum: Arthropoda
- Class: Insecta
- Order: Hymenoptera
- Suborder: Symphyta
- Family: Argidae
- Genus: Cibdela; Konow, 1899

= Cibdela =

Genus of sawflies

Cibdela is a genus of sawflies in the family Argidae.

== Species ==
- Cibdela chakrataensis Saini & Thind 1989
- Cibdela chinensis Rohwer, 1921
- Cibdela choptaensis Saini & Thind 1989
- Cibdela dilate (Wei, ????)
- Cibdela flavipennis Enderlein 1919
- Cibdela hyalinia Wei 2005
- Cibdela janthina (Klug, 1834)
- Cibdela maculipennis (Cameron 1899)
- Cibdela melanomala (Wei, 1999)
- Cibdela melanoptera Rohwer, 1921
- Cibdela poecilotricha (Konow, 1898)
- Cibdela ramgarhensis Saini & Thind 1989
- Cibdela scita (Konow, 1900)
- Cibdela smithi Saini & Thind 1989
- Cibdela zhejiangia (Wei & Nie, 1998)
