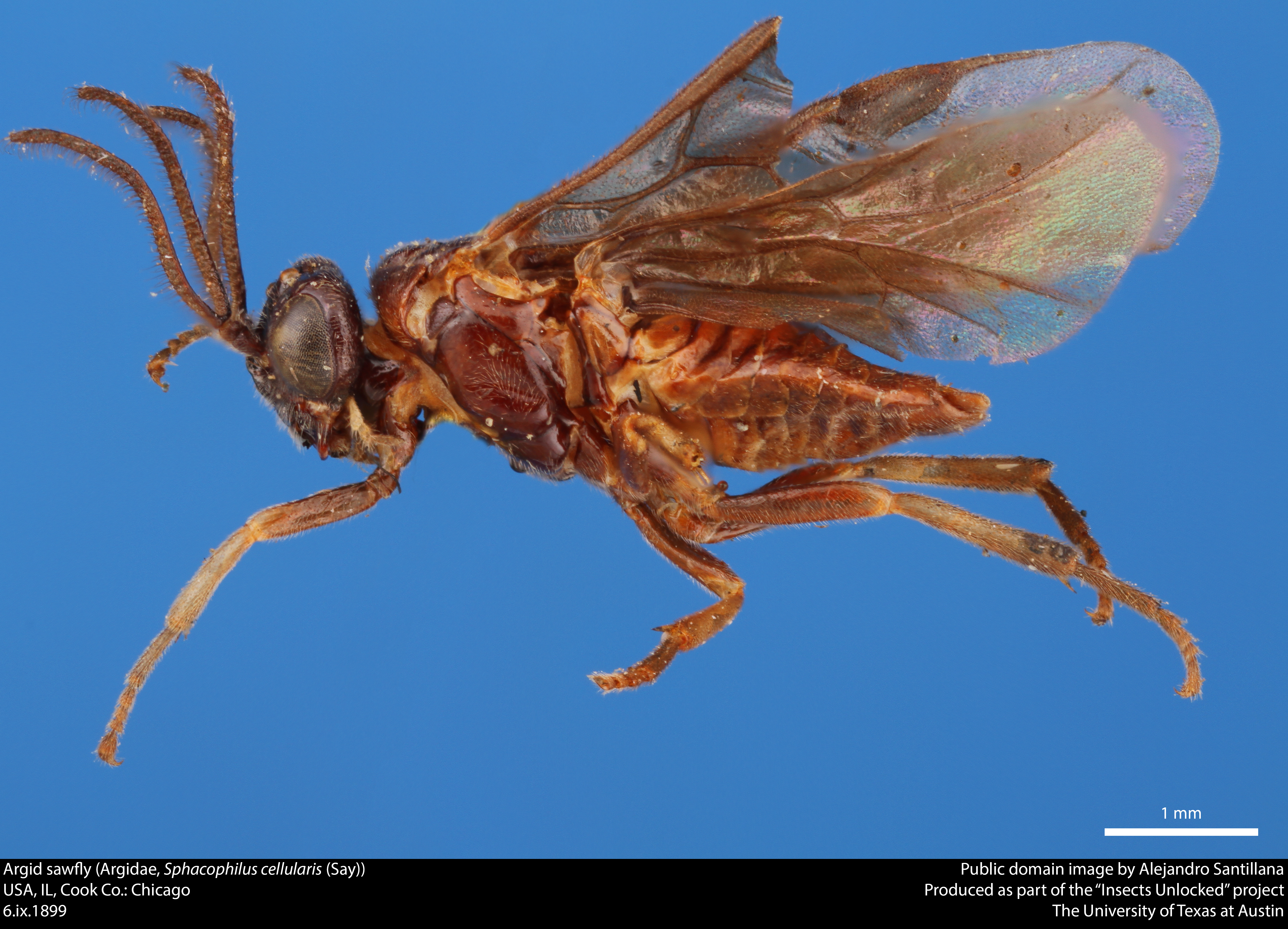

Scientific classification
- Domain: Eukaryota
- Kingdom: Animalia
- Phylum: Arthropoda
- Class: Insecta
- Order: Hymenoptera
- Suborder: Symphyta
- Family: Argidae
- Genus: Sphacophilus
- Species: S. cellularis

Binomial name
- Sphacophilus cellularis (Say)

= Sphacophilus cellularis =

Species of sawfly

Sphacophilus cellularis is a species of sawfly in the family Argidae.
