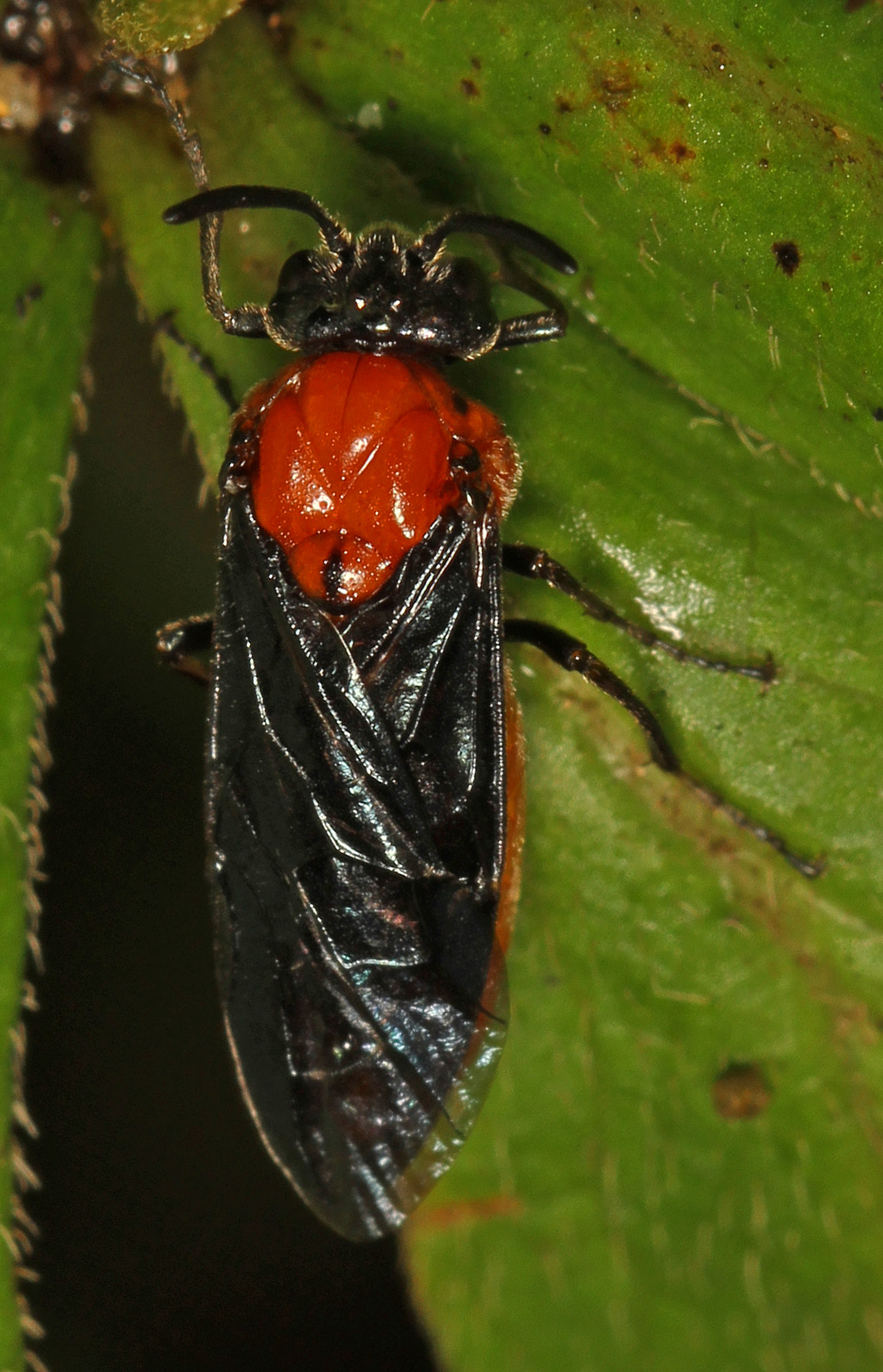

Scientific classification
- Domain: Eukaryota
- Kingdom: Animalia
- Phylum: Arthropoda
- Class: Insecta
- Order: Hymenoptera
- Suborder: Symphyta
- Family: Argidae
- Genus: Arge
- Species: A. pectoralis

Binomial name
- Arge pectoralis (Leach)

= Arge pectoralis =

Species of sawfly

Arge pectoralis, the birch sawfly, is a species of argid sawfly in the family Argidae. This sawfly is present in North America.
