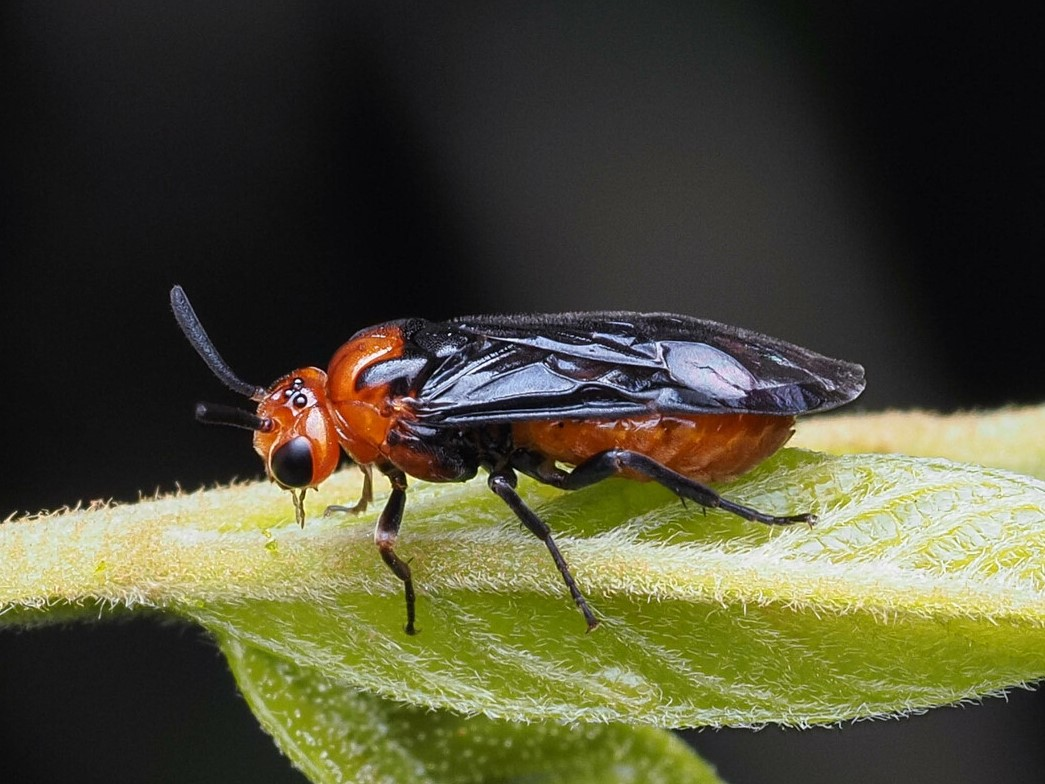

Scientific classification
- Kingdom: Animalia
- Phylum: Arthropoda
- Class: Insecta
- Order: Hymenoptera
- Suborder: Symphyta
- Family: Argidae
- Genus: Antargidium
- Species: A. dentivalve

Binomial name
- Antargidium dentivalve (Benson, 1934)

= Antargidium dentivalve =

Species of insect

Antargidium dentivalve is a species of sawfly in the family Argidae . It is found in New South Wales and Queensland, Australia and its hosts are Arytera divaricata and Arytera foveolata.
