= Antargidium nigrum =

Scientific classification
- Domain: Eukaryota
- Kingdom: Animalia
- Phylum: Arthropoda
- Class: Insecta
- Order: Hymenoptera
- Suborder: Symphyta
- Family: Argidae
- Genus: Antargidium
- Species: A. nigrum

Binomial name
- Antargidium nigrum Schmidt, 2012

Species of insect

Antargidium nigrum is a species of sawfly from the Argidae family, named for its predominantly black colour. It is found in Western Australia.
