= Antargidium allucente =

Scientific classification
- Domain: Eukaryota
- Kingdom: Animalia
- Phylum: Arthropoda
- Class: Insecta
- Order: Hymenoptera
- Suborder: Symphyta
- Family: Argidae
- Genus: Antargidium
- Species: A. allucente

Binomial name
- Antargidium allucente Benson, 1934

Species of insect

Antargidium allucente is a species of sawfly belonging to the family Argidae. It is found in New South Wales and Queensland. Its host is Alectryon oleifolius.
