= Arge scapularis =

Elm argid sawfly

Scientific classification
- Domain: Eukaryota
- Kingdom: Animalia
- Phylum: Arthropoda
- Class: Insecta
- Order: Hymenoptera
- Suborder: Symphyta
- Family: Argidae
- Genus: Arge
- Species: A. scapularis

Binomial name
- Arge scapularis J. C. F. Klug, 1814

Species of sawfly

Arge scapularis or elm argid sawfly is a sawfly in the family Argidae. It is found across North America and commonly infests elm trees. The name "scapularis" refers to the insect's distinctive so-called "shoulder blades".

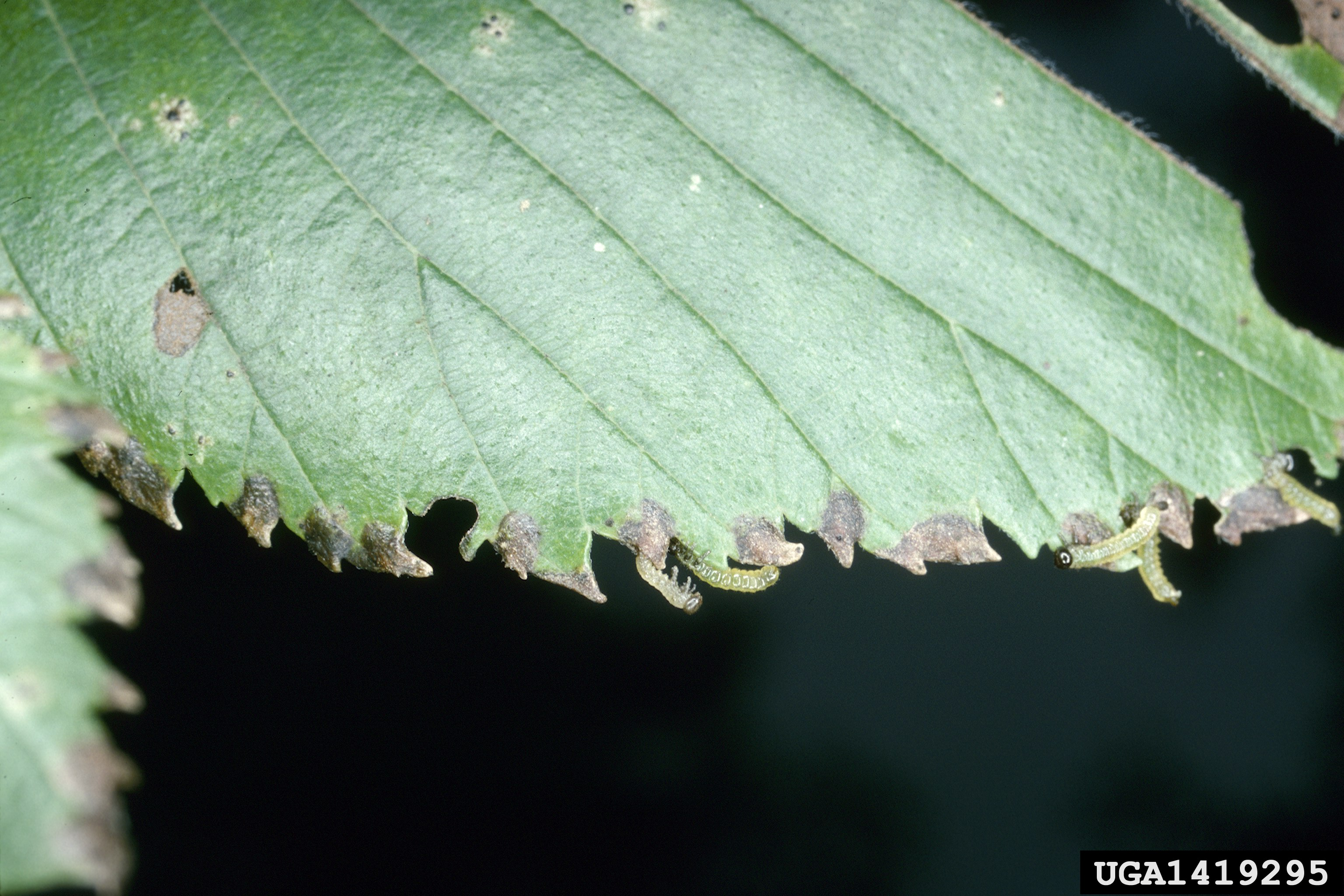
Early larvae on an American Elm leaf

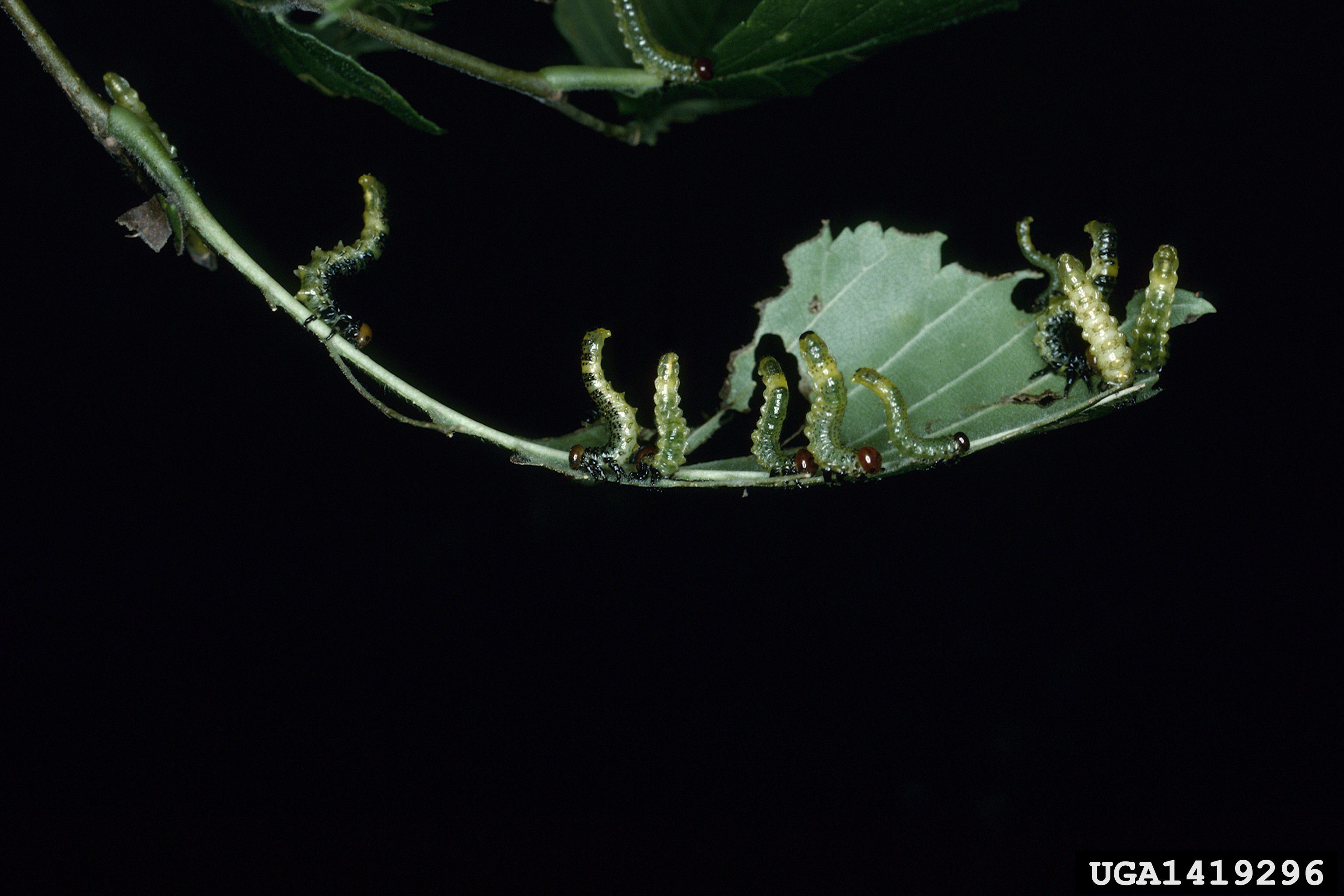
Larvae

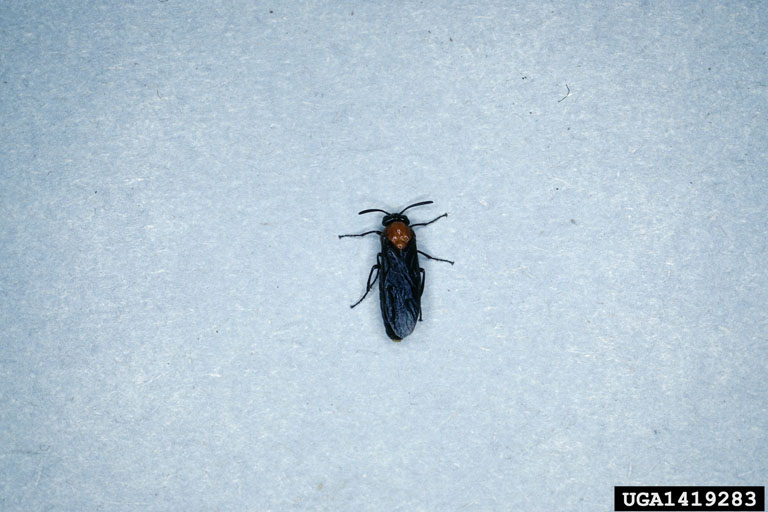
Adult female

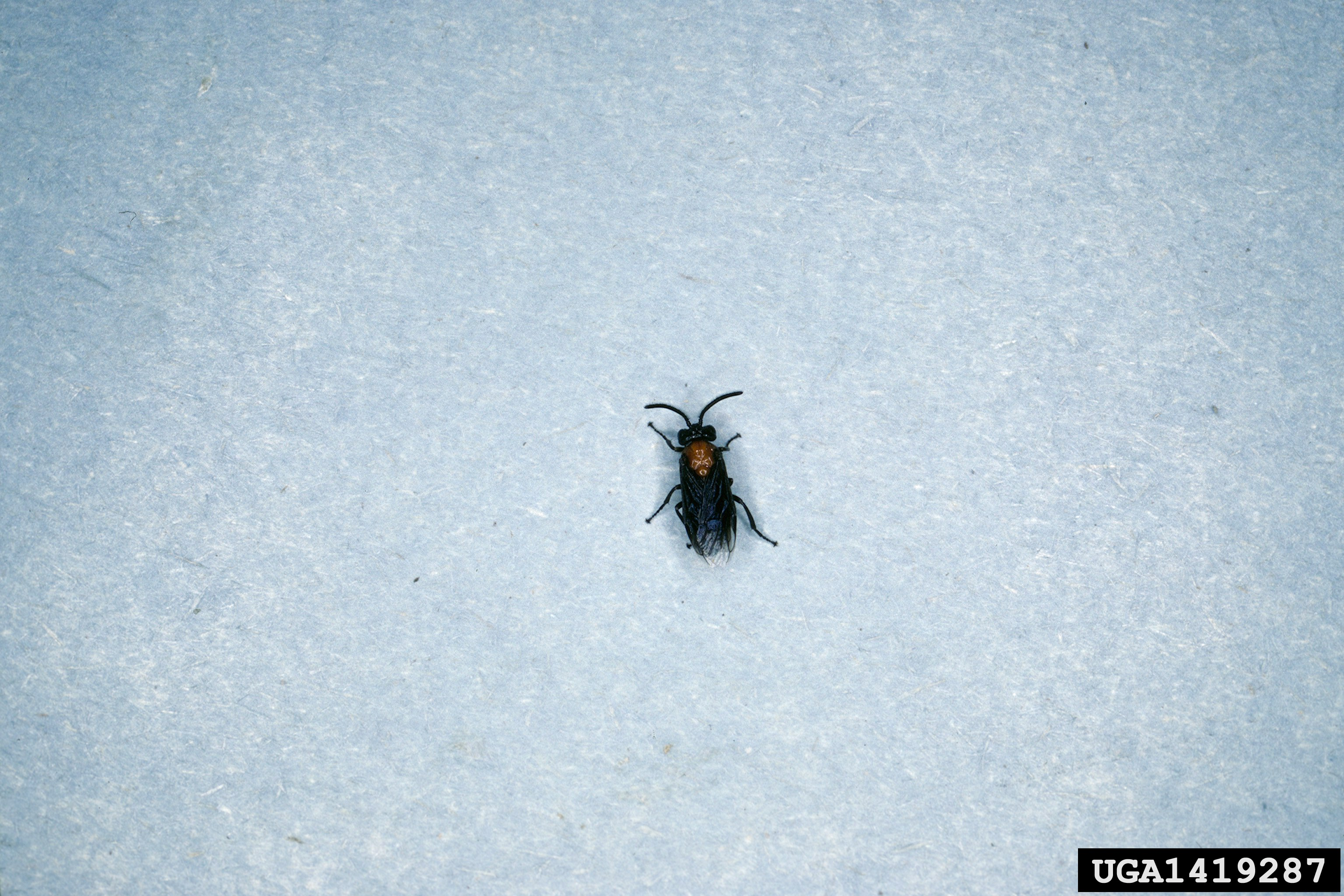
Adult male
