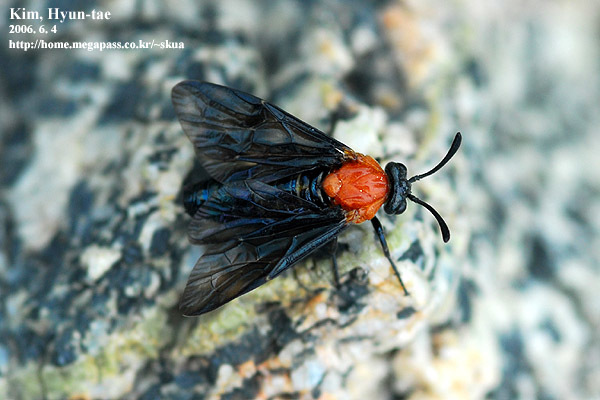

Scientific classification
- Kingdom: Animalia
- Phylum: Arthropoda
- Clade: Pancrustacea
- Class: Insecta
- Order: Hymenoptera
- Suborder: Symphyta
- Family: Argidae
- Genus: Arge
- Species: A. captiva

Binomial name
- Arge captiva Schrank, 1802

= Arge captiva =

Species of insect

Arge captiva is a species from the genus Arge. This species was originally described by Franz von Paula Schrank in 1802
