= Arge aenea =

Scientific classification
- Domain: Eukaryota
- Kingdom: Animalia
- Phylum: Arthropoda
- Class: Insecta
- Order: Hymenoptera
- Suborder: Symphyta
- Family: Argidae
- Genus: Arge
- Species: A. aenea

Binomial name
- Arge aenea Hara & Shinohara, 2012

Species of insect

Arge aenea is a species of sawfly found in Asia, specifically Japan, Korea, China and Russia. Prior to being formally described as a separate species, specimens of this species were determined as Arge metallica. Its host is the birch tree, Betula ermanii.
