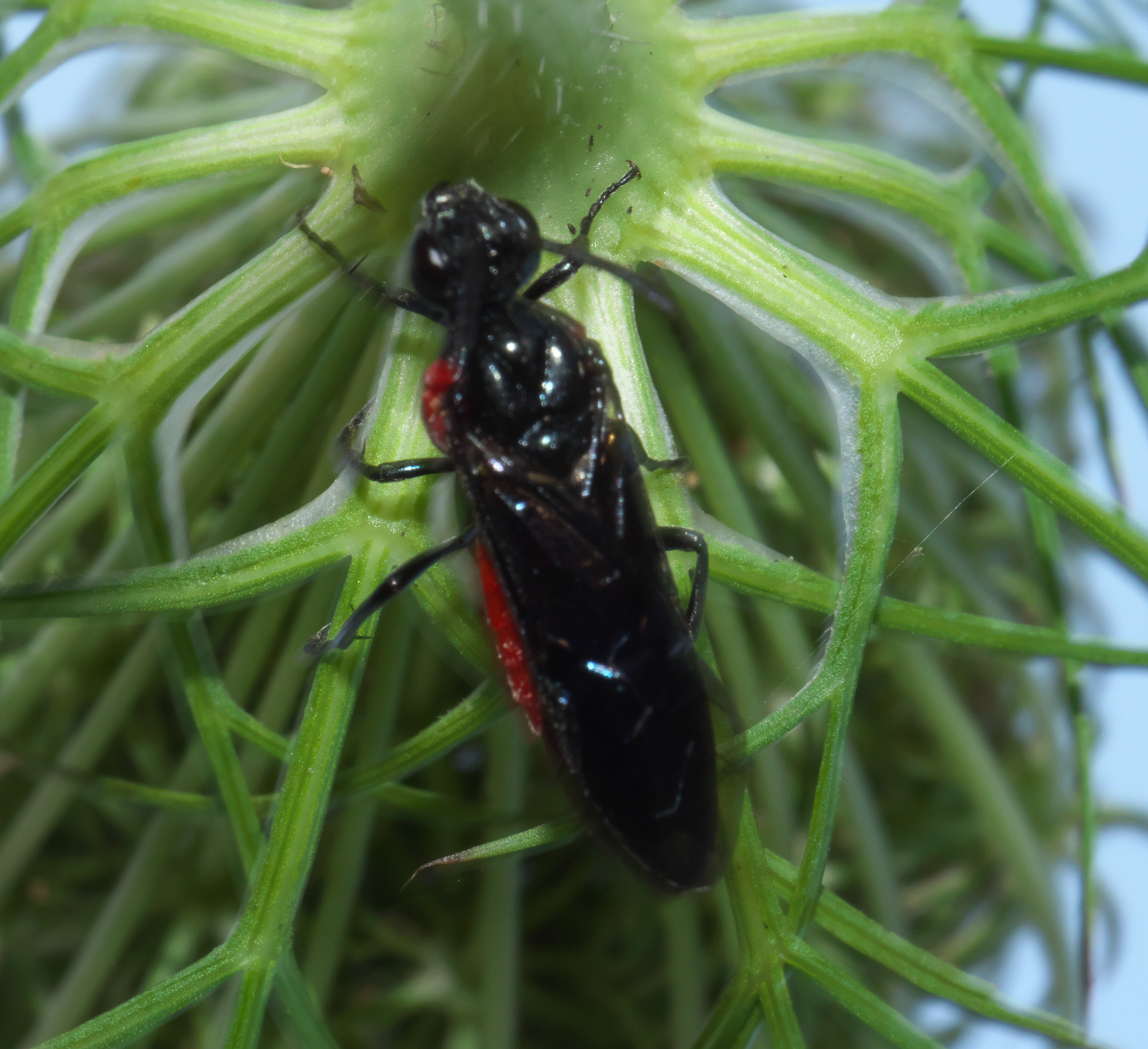

Scientific classification
- Domain: Eukaryota
- Kingdom: Animalia
- Phylum: Arthropoda
- Class: Insecta
- Order: Hymenoptera
- Suborder: Symphyta
- Family: Argidae
- Genus: Arge
- Species: A. humeralis

Binomial name
- Arge humeralis (Beauvois)

= Arge humeralis =

Species of sawfly

Arge humeralis, the poison ivy sawfly, is a species of argid sawfly in the family Argidae.

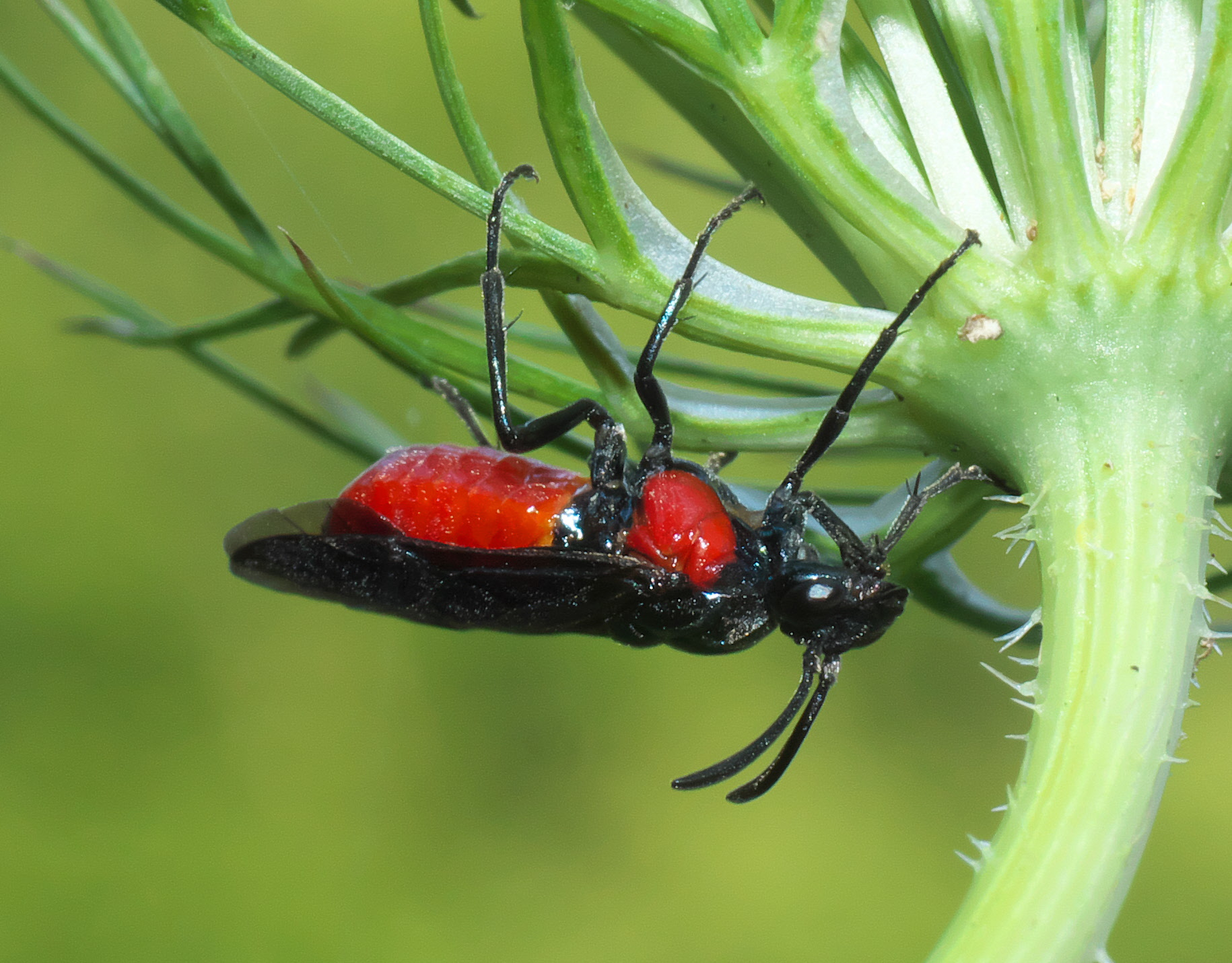
Poison ivy sawfly, Arge humeralis

Larvae feed on poison ivy, Toxicodendron radicans.
