= Antargidium flavescens =

Scientific classification
- Domain: Eukaryota
- Kingdom: Animalia
- Phylum: Arthropoda
- Class: Insecta
- Order: Hymenoptera
- Suborder: Symphyta
- Family: Argidae
- Genus: Antargidium
- Species: A. flavescens

Binomial name
- Antargidium flavescens Schmidt, 2012

Species of insect

Antargidium flavescens is a species of sawfly belonging to the Argidae family, it is only known by one specimen. It is found in Western Australia.
