= Antargidium apicale =

Scientific classification
- Domain: Eukaryota
- Kingdom: Animalia
- Phylum: Arthropoda
- Class: Insecta
- Order: Hymenoptera
- Suborder: Symphyta
- Family: Argidae
- Genus: Antargidium
- Species: A. apicale

Binomial name
- Antargidium apicale (Kirby, 1894)

Species of insect

Antargidium apicale is a species of sawfly belonging to the family Argidae. It is found in Queensland and its host is Alectryon oleifolius.
