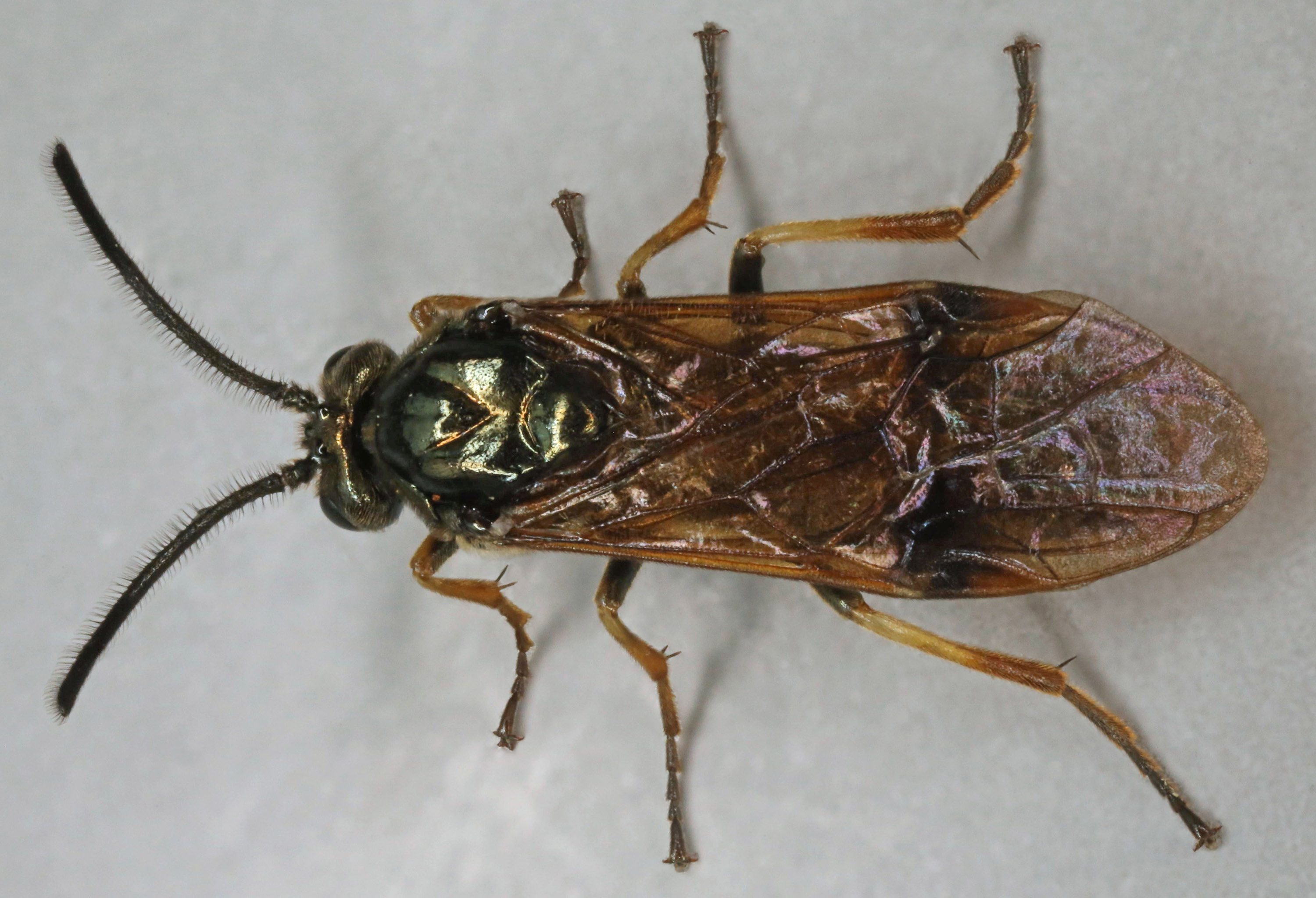
- Arge ustulata, Fenn's Moss, North Wales

Scientific classification
- Kingdom: Animalia
- Phylum: Arthropoda
- Class: Insecta
- Order: Hymenoptera
- Suborder: Symphyta
- Family: Argidae
- Genus: Arge
- Species: A. ustulata

Binomial name
- Arge ustulata (Linnaeus, 1758)

Synonyms
- Tenthredo ustulata Linnaeus, 1758

= Arge ustulata =

Species of sawfly

Arge ustulata is a Palearctic species of sawfly.
