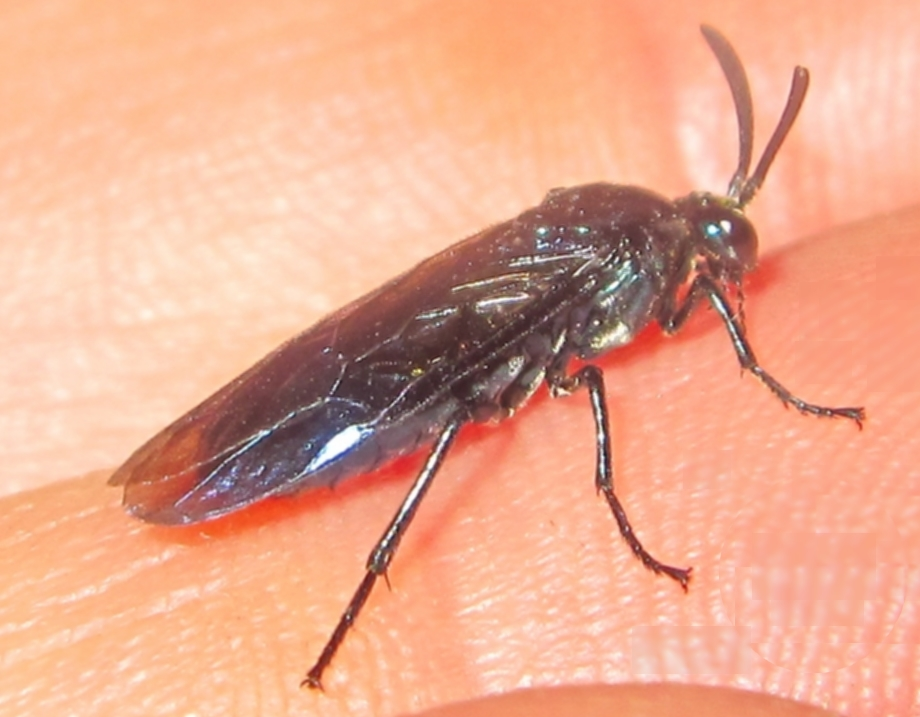

Scientific classification
- Kingdom: Animalia
- Phylum: Arthropoda
- Clade: Pancrustacea
- Class: Insecta
- Order: Hymenoptera
- Suborder: Symphyta
- Family: Argidae
- Genus: Cibdela
- Species: C. janthina

Binomial name
- Cibdela janthina (Klug, 1834)

= Cibdela janthina =

Species of sawfly

Cibdela janthina is a sawfly of the family Argidae. This species originates from Sumatra in South-East Asia but had also been introduced to La Réunion in 2007 for biological pest control of Rubus alceifolius, a Rosaceae species that had become an invasive species.

It has a metallic dark-blue colour, the males have a length of approx. 8 mm and the females of 9.5 mm.

A parasitoid of C. janthina is Proterops borneoensis.

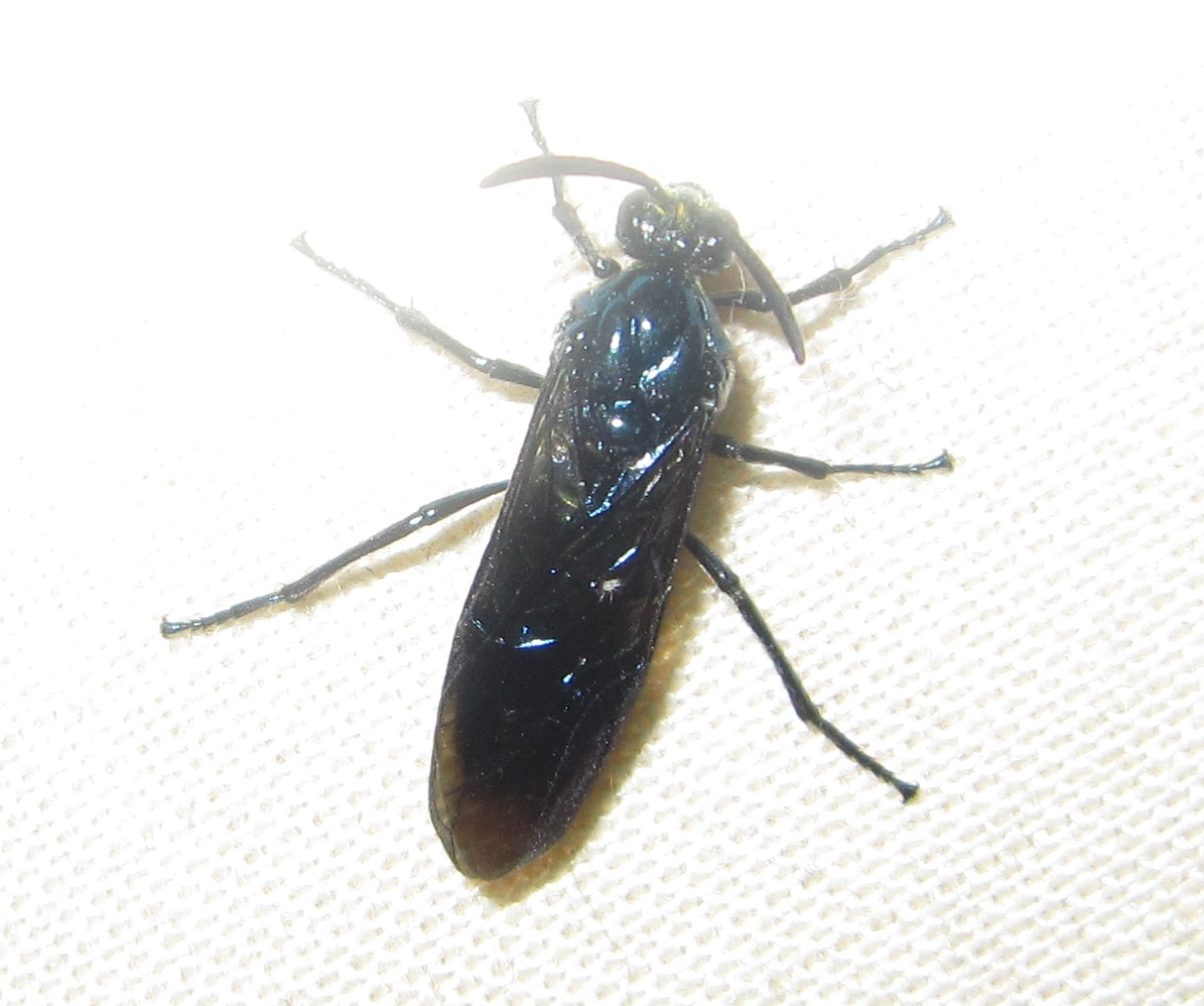
Cibdela janthina

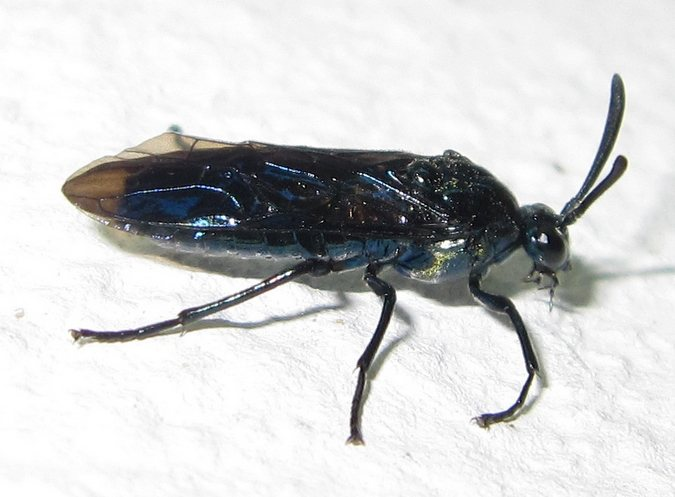
Cibdela janthina

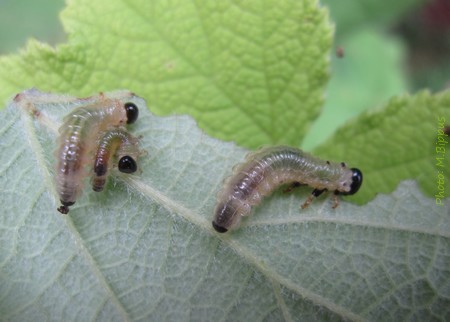
Cibdela janthina larvae on Rubus alceifolius leaf
