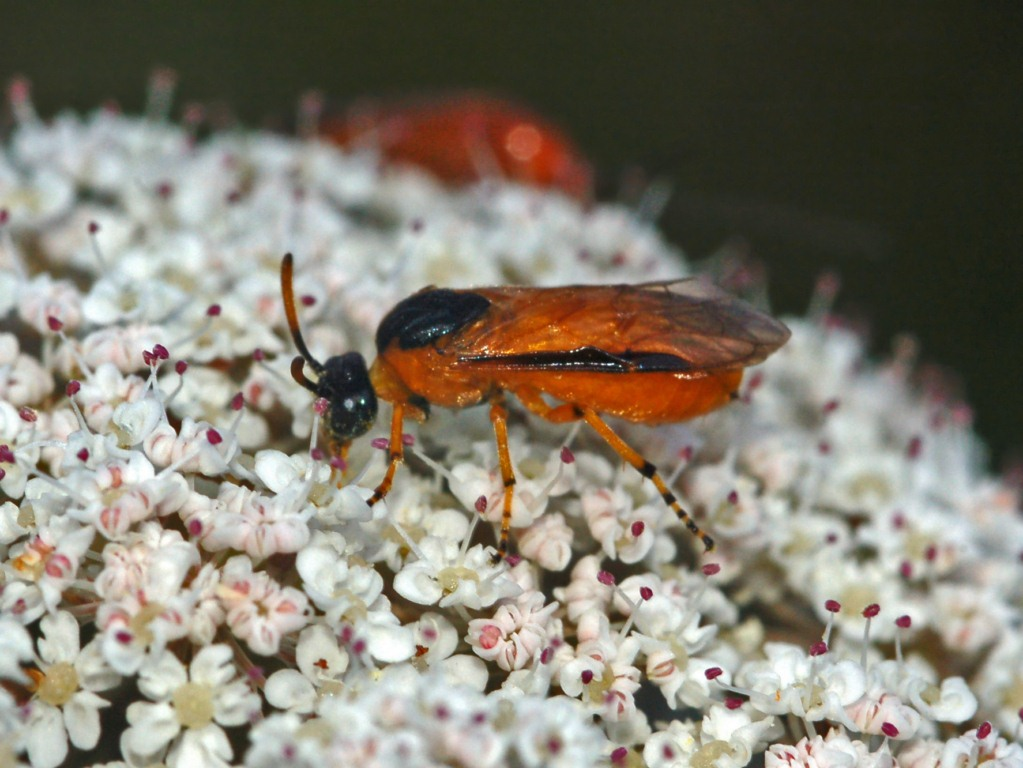
- Arge ochropus

Scientific classification
- Domain: Eukaryota
- Kingdom: Animalia
- Phylum: Arthropoda
- Class: Insecta
- Order: Hymenoptera
- Suborder: Symphyta
- Family: Argidae
- Subfamily: Arginae
- Genus: Arge; Schrank, 1802

Synonyms
- List: Acanthoptenos Ashmead, 1898; Alloscenia Enderlein, 1919; Bathyblepta Konow, 1906; Corynia Imhof & Labram, 1836; Cryptus Jurine, 1801; Didocha Konow, 1907; Hylotoma Latreille, 1803; Miocephala Konow, 1907; Pseudarge Gussakovskij, 1935; Rhopalospira Enderlein, 1920; Rhopalospiria Enderlein, 1919; Triarge Forsius, 1931

= Arge (sawfly) =

Genus of sawflies

Arge rustica

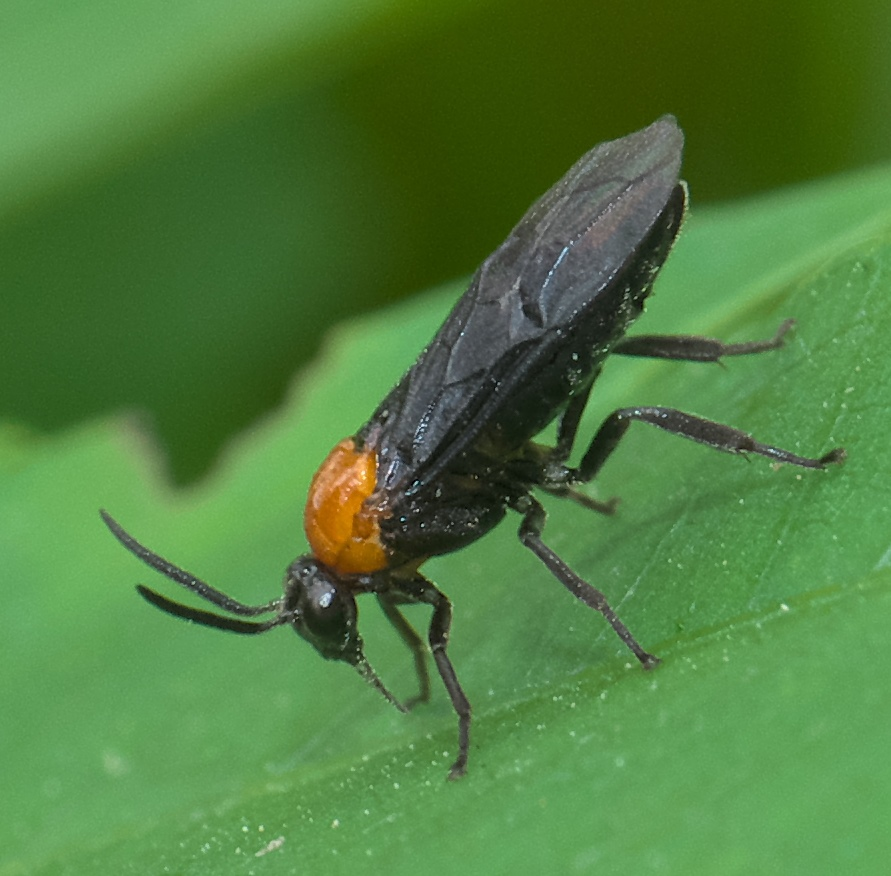

Arge is a genus of sawflies belonging to the family Argidae subfamily Arginae.

== Species ==
The following species are recognised in the genus Arge:

- Alloscenia eversmanni (Gussakovskij, 1935)
- Arge aciculata Hara & Shinohara, 2014
- Arge aenea Hara & Shinohara, 2008
- Arge albocincta (Cameron, 1876)
- Arge annulata Konow, 1891
- Arge aruncus Hara & Shinohara, 2012
- Arge auripennis Konow, 1891
- Arge aurora Wei, 2022
- Arge beckeri (Tournier, 1889)
- Arge bella Wei & Du, 2018
- Arge berberidis Schrank, 1802 – berberis sawfly
- Arge bipunctata (Cameron, 1877)
- Arge captiva (Smith, 1874)
- Arge caucasica Tournier, 1889
- Arge cerasus Shinohara & Hara, 2012
- Arge ciliaris (Linnaeus, 1767)
- Arge cingulata Jakowlew, 1891
- Arge clavicornis (Fabricius, 1781)
- Arge cyanocrocea (Forster, 1771)
- Arge cyra (Kirby, 1882)
- Arge davidi Koch & Liston, 2012
- Arge dimidiata (Fallén, 1808)
- Arge dorsalis Koch & Liston, 2012
- Arge enkianthus Hara & Shinohara, 2012
- Arge enodis (Linnaeus, 1767)
- Arge expansa (Klug, 1834)
- Arge flavicollis (Cameron, 1876)
- Arge frivaldszkyi (Tischbein, 1852)
- Arge fulvicauda Hara & Shinohara, 2008
- Arge fumipennis (Smith, 1878)
- Arge fuscipennis (Herrich-Schäffer, 1833)
- Arge fuscipes (Fallén, 1808)
- Arge gracilicornis (Klug, 1814)
- Arge humeralis (Beauvois) – poison ivy sawfly
- Arge ibukii Hara & Shinohara, 2020
- Arge impolita Hara & Shinohara, 2014
- Arge indicura Shinohara & Hara, 2009
- Arge koreana Wei & Lee, 2016
- Arge macleayi (Leach, 1817)
- Arge macrops Shinohara, Hara & Kim, 2009
- Arge melanochra (Gmelin, 1790)
- Arge melanochroa (Gmelin, 1790)
- Arge meliosmae Shinohara & Hara, 2011
- Arge metallica (Klug, 1834)
- Arge metalloflagella Wei, Shinohara & Hara, 2011
- Arge naokoae Shinohara & Hara, 2013
- Arge nigripes (Retzius, 1783)
- Arge nigronodosa (Motschulsky, 1860)
- Arge niuae Shinohara, Hara & Wei, 2011
- Arge nokoensis Takeuchi, 1928
- Arge obesa Hara & Shinohara, 2012
- Arge ochropus (Gmelin, 1790) – rose sawfly
- Arge onerosa (MacGillivray 1923)
- Arge pagana (Panzer, 1798)
- Arge pallidinervis Gussakovskij, 1935
- Arge pasteelsi Blank, Liston & Taeger, 2009
- Arge pectoralis (Leach) – birch sawfly
- Arge pleuritica (Klug, 1834)
- Arge pretoriaensis Cameron, 1911
- Arge pseudorejecta Wei & Lee, 2016
- Arge pullata (Zaddach, 1859)
- Arge pyracanthae Wei & Shinohara
- Arge quidia Smith, 1989 – willow oak sawfly
- Arge rustica (Linnaeus, 1758)
- Arge sauteri (Enslin, 1911)
- Arge scapularis (Klug, 1814) – elm argid sawfly
- Arge scita (Mocsary, 1880)
- Arge shawi Liston, 1992
- Arge shengi Wei & Lee, 2016
- Arge similis (Vollenhoven, 1860) – azalea argid sawfly
- Arge simulatrix Konow, 1887
- Arge smithi Blank, Liston & Taeger, 2009
- Arge sorbi Schedl & Pschorn-Walcher, 1984
- Arge sparta (MacGillivray, 1923)
- Arge spec Konow, 1907}
- Arge stecki Benson, 1939
- Arge stuhlmanni (Kohl 1893)
- Arge swartbergensis Koch & Liston, 2012
- Arge takanebara Hara & Shinohara, 2013
- Arge tergestina (Kriechbaumer, 1876)
- Arge thoracica (Spinola, 1807)
- Arge tigrata Blank, Liston & Taeger, 2009
- Arge transvaalensis Cameron, 1911
- Arge tsunekii Togashi, 1973
- Arge tuberculata Hara & Shinohara, 2008
- Arge ustulata (Linnaeus, 1758)
- Arge vannoorti Koch & Liston, 2012
- Arge ventralis Koch & Liston, 2012
- Arge vulnerata Mocsary, 1909
- Arge xanthogaster Cameron, 1876
- Hylotoma imperalis Smith, 1860
- Miocephala chalybea Konow, 1907
- BOLD:AAE6147 (Arge sp.)
- BOLD:AAG7787 (Arge sp.)
- BOLD:AAG7857 (Arge sp.)
- BOLD:AAU8832 (Arge sp.)
- BOLD:AAY5570 (Arge sp.)
- BOLD:ACM0200 (Arge sp.)
- BOLD:ACO9641 (Arge sp.)
- BOLD:ACP1010 (Arge sp.)
- BOLD:ADJ1021 (Arge sp.)
- BOLD:AEN7118 (Arge sp.)
- BOLD:AEN7121 (Arge sp.)
