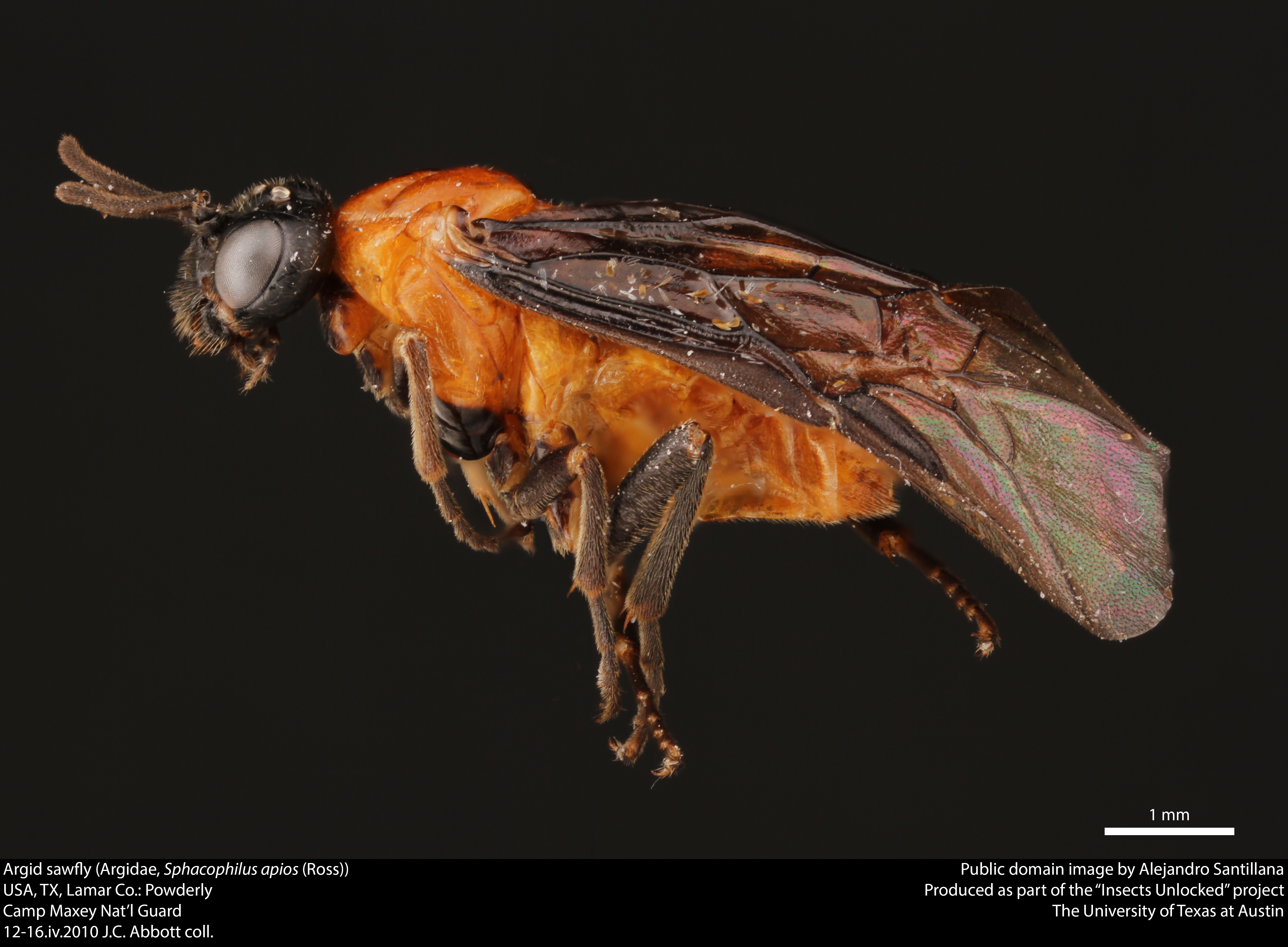
- Sphacophilus apios

Scientific classification
- Domain: Eukaryota
- Kingdom: Animalia
- Phylum: Arthropoda
- Class: Insecta
- Order: Hymenoptera
- Suborder: Symphyta
- Family: Argidae
- Subfamily: Sterictiphorinae
- Genus: Sphacophilus; Provancher, 1888

= Sphacophilus =

Genus of sawflies

Sphacophilus is a genus of sawflies in the family Argidae. There are more than 30 described species in Sphacophilus.

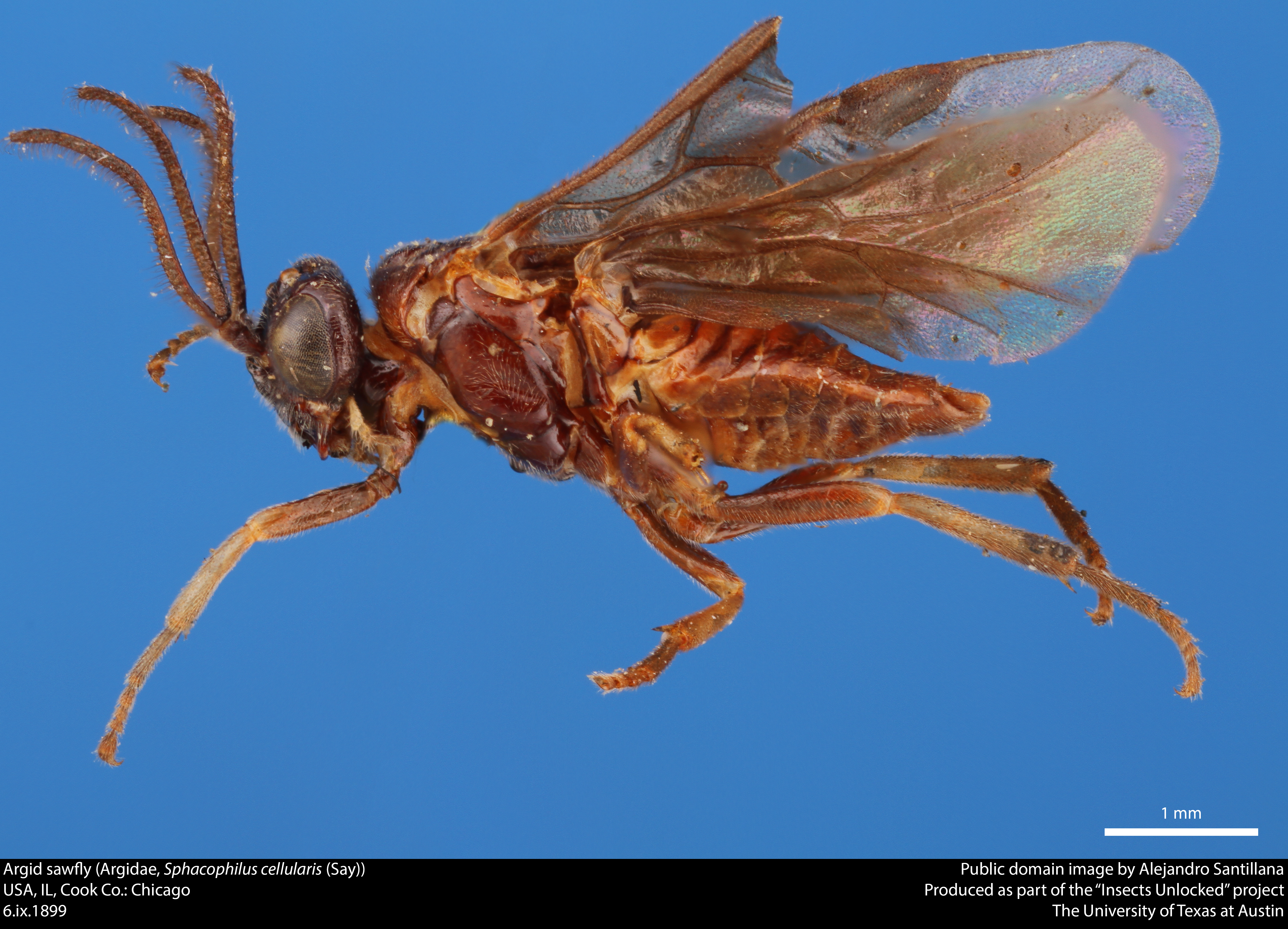
Sphacophilus cellularis

== Species ==
These 32 species belong to the genus Sphacophilus:

- Sphacophilus albicosta Smith
- Sphacophilus apiculus Smith
- Sphacophilus apios Ross, 1933
- Sphacophilus argutus Smith
- Sphacophilus barius Smith
- Sphacophilus cellularis (Say)
- Sphacophilus ceraus Smith
- Sphacophilus crenus Smith
- Sphacophilus darus Smith
- Sphacophilus dissensus Smith
- Sphacophilus edus Smith
- Sphacophilus hamus Smith
- Sphacophilus holmus Smith
- Sphacophilus iotus Smith
- Sphacophilus janzeni Smith
- Sphacophilus jucunus Smith
- Sphacophilus madunus Smith
- Sphacophilus memmonius Smith
- Sphacophilus monjarasi Smith & Morales-Reyes, 2015
- Sphacophilus nigriceps
- Sphacophilus nuntius Smith
- Sphacophilus oblatus Smith
- Sphacophilus odontus Smith
- Sphacophilus orthius Smith
- Sphacophilus orus Smith
- Sphacophilus panitus Smith
- Sphacophilus partitus Smith
- Sphacophilus precarius Smith
- Sphacophilus quixus Smith
- Sphacophilus rallus Smith
- Sphacophilus tenuous Smith
- Sphacophilus triangularis Smith
