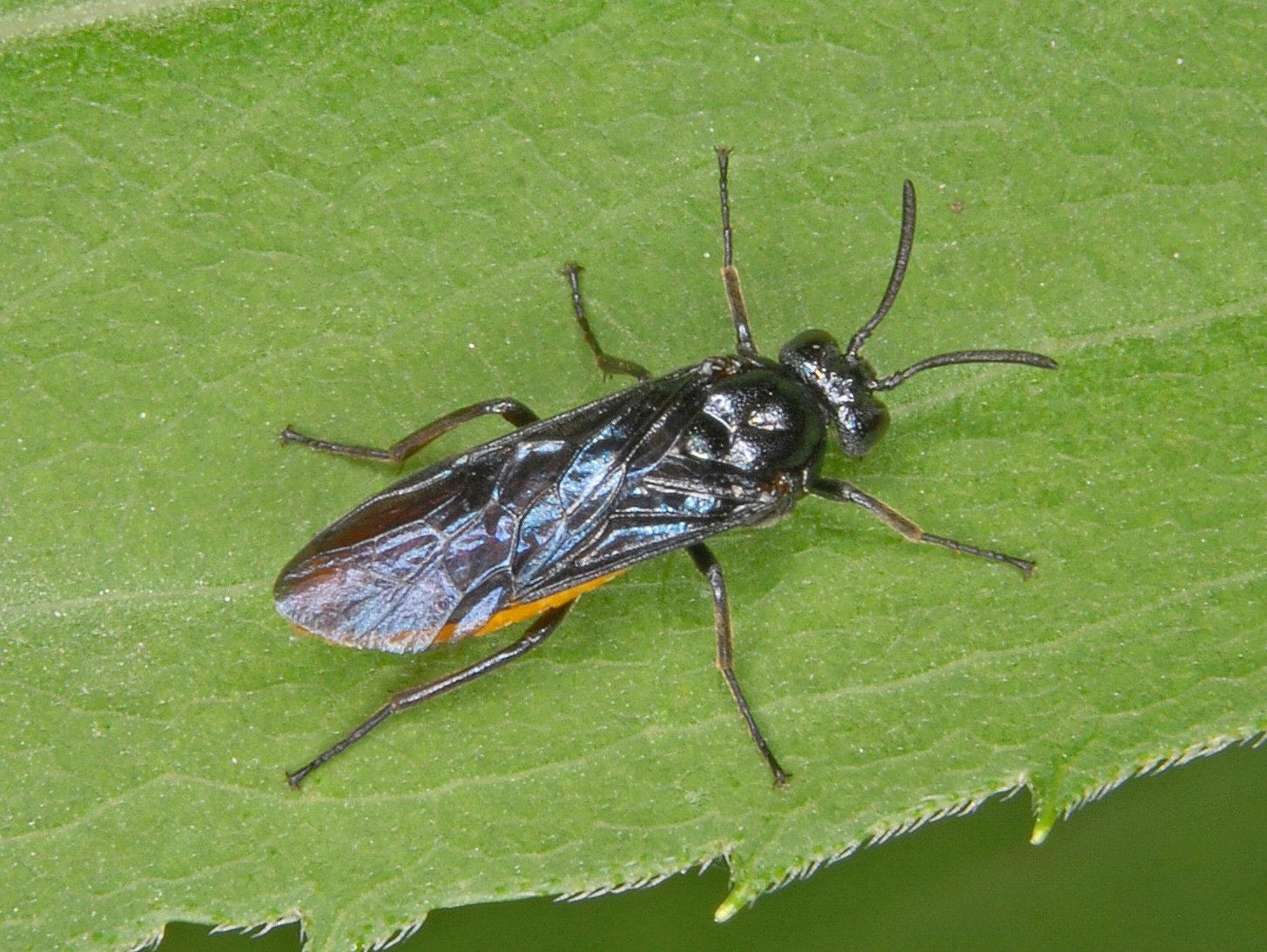
- Arge pagana. Dorsal view
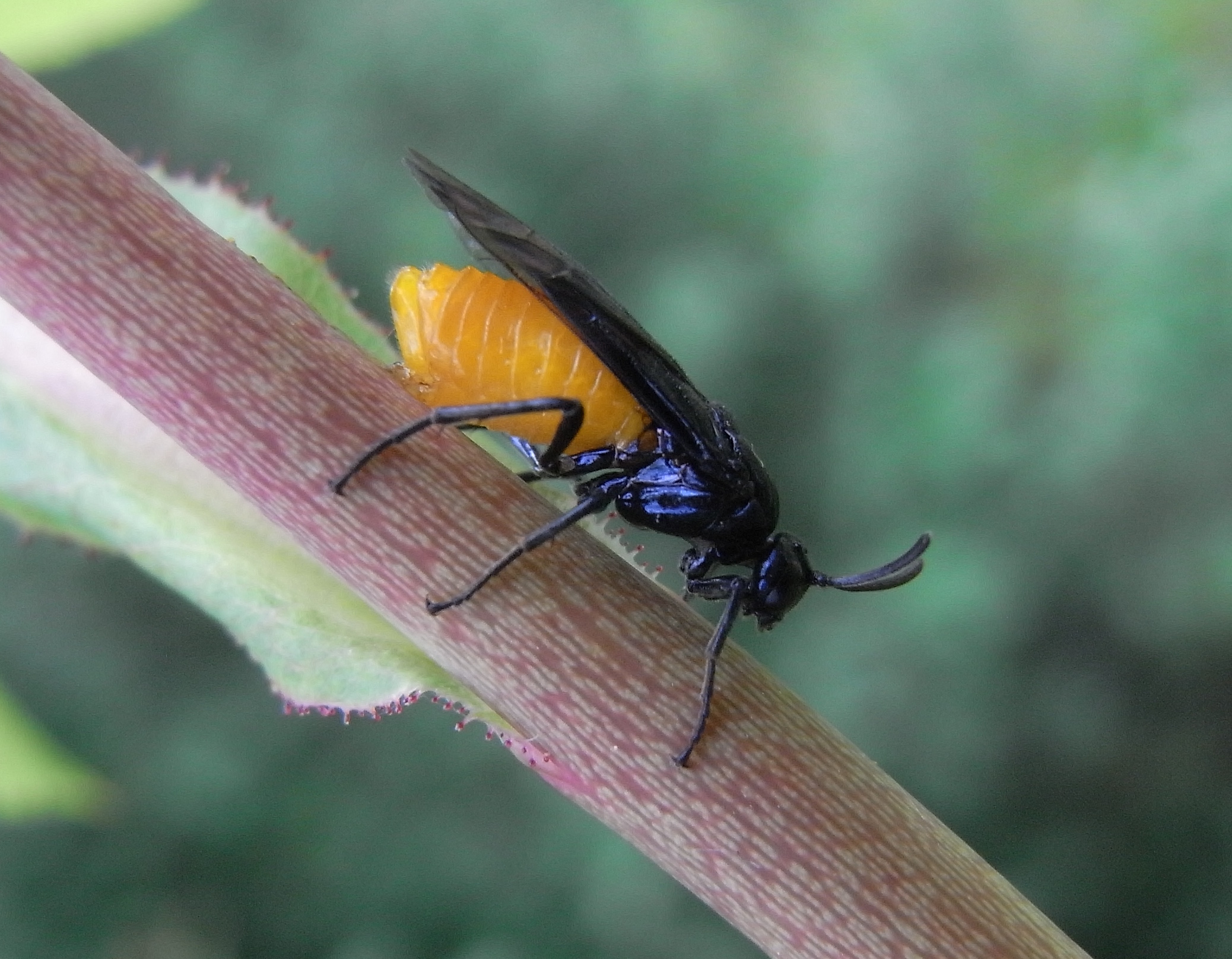
- Side view

Scientific classification
- Kingdom: Animalia
- Phylum: Arthropoda
- Clade: Pancrustacea
- Class: Insecta
- Order: Hymenoptera
- Suborder: Symphyta
- Family: Argidae
- Genus: Arge
- Species: A. pagana

Binomial name
- Arge pagana (Panzer, 1798)

Synonyms
- Arge rosae; Tenthredo pagana Panzer, 1798

= Arge pagana =

Species of sawfly

Arge pagana is a sawfly in the family Argidae. It is known by the name "large rose sawfly" although the related species Arge ochropus is also known by this name.

== Subspecies ==
- Arge pagana pagana (Panzer, 1798)
- Arge pagana stephensii (Leach, 1817) (British Isles)

== Distribution ==
This species can be found in the Palearctic realm.

== Description ==
Arge pagana can reach a length of about 1 cm. Wings and veins on the wings are black, often with blue metallic sheen. Pronotum and legs are also black. Its most conspicuous feature is a large rounded yellow abdomen. It has a black head and thorax and the legs are largely black. Larvae reach about 25 mm and are pale green with black dots and a yellow head.

== Biology ==
The eggs are laid on roses. Larvae appear in early summer and reach full size by the end of July. The larvae are gregarious and live in colonies feeding on rose leaves (Rosa species, Rosa acicularis).

The pupal period is very short. Adults feed on nectar and pollen from Tanacetum vulgare and Heracleum sphondylium. During the warmer years there may be two or, rarely, three generations.

== Gallery ==
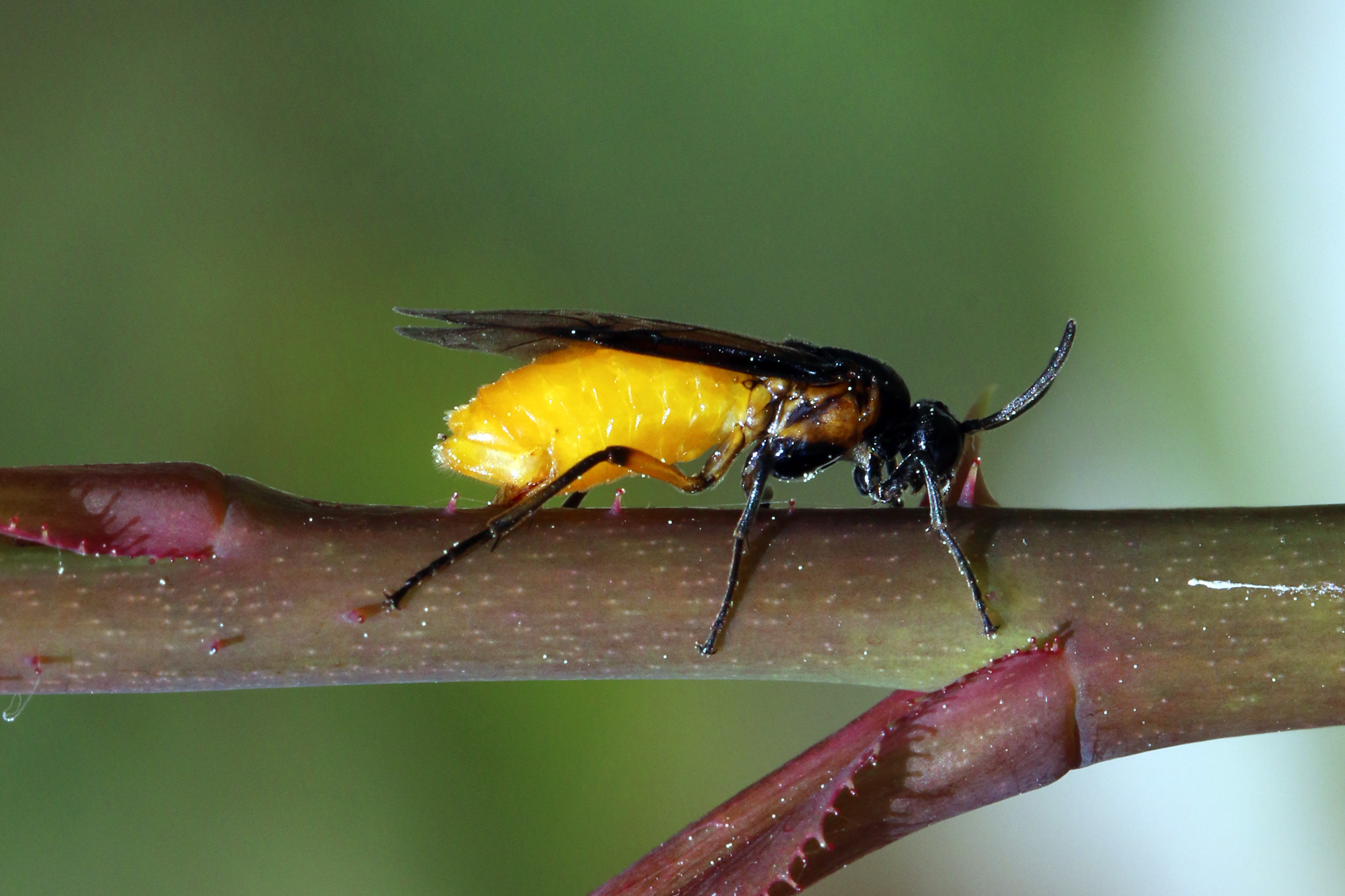
A. p. stephensii, Oxfordshire. laying eggs, the ovipositor can just be seen between the rear legs.

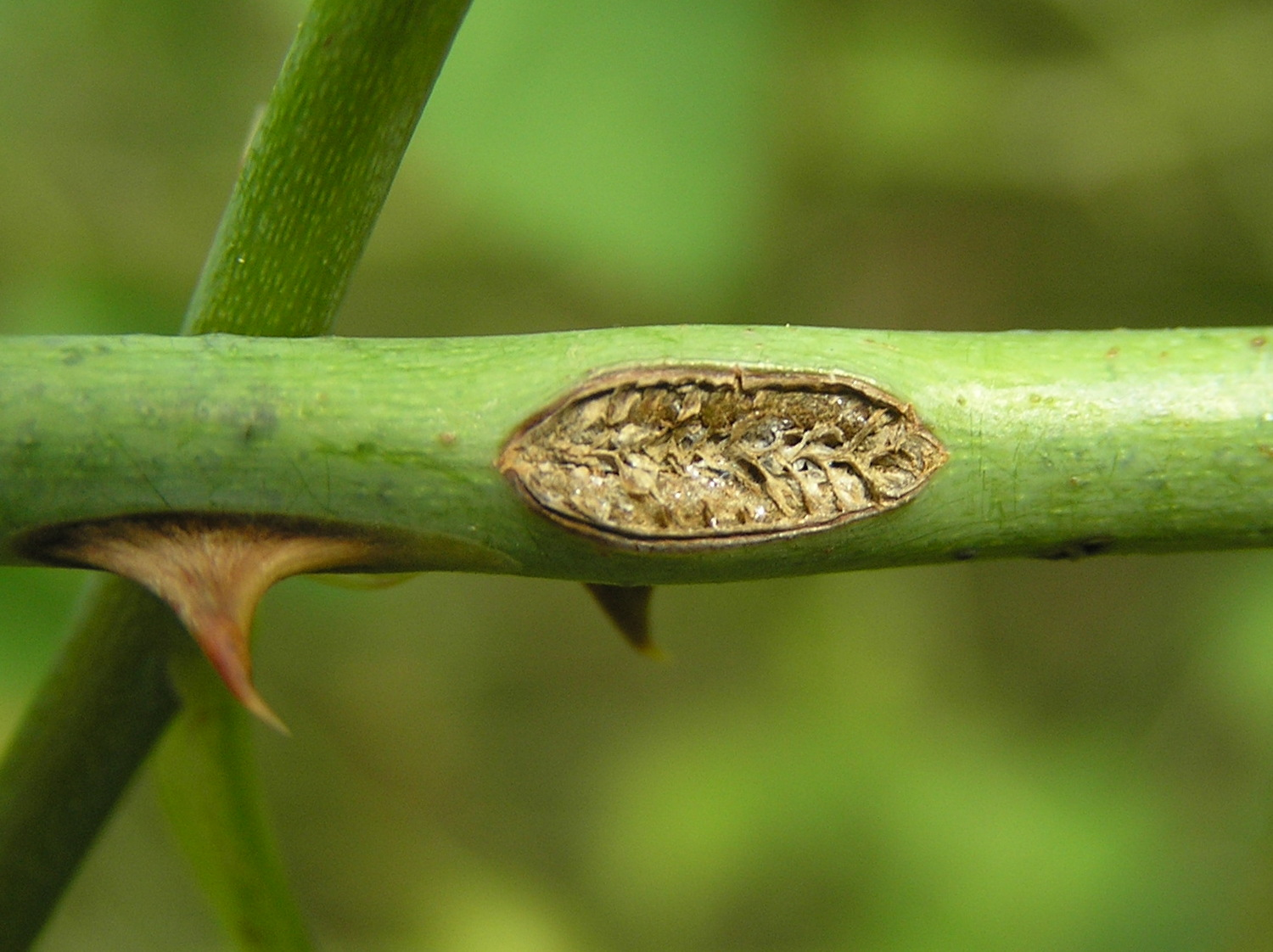
Scar on the shoot of rose after the hatching of eggs

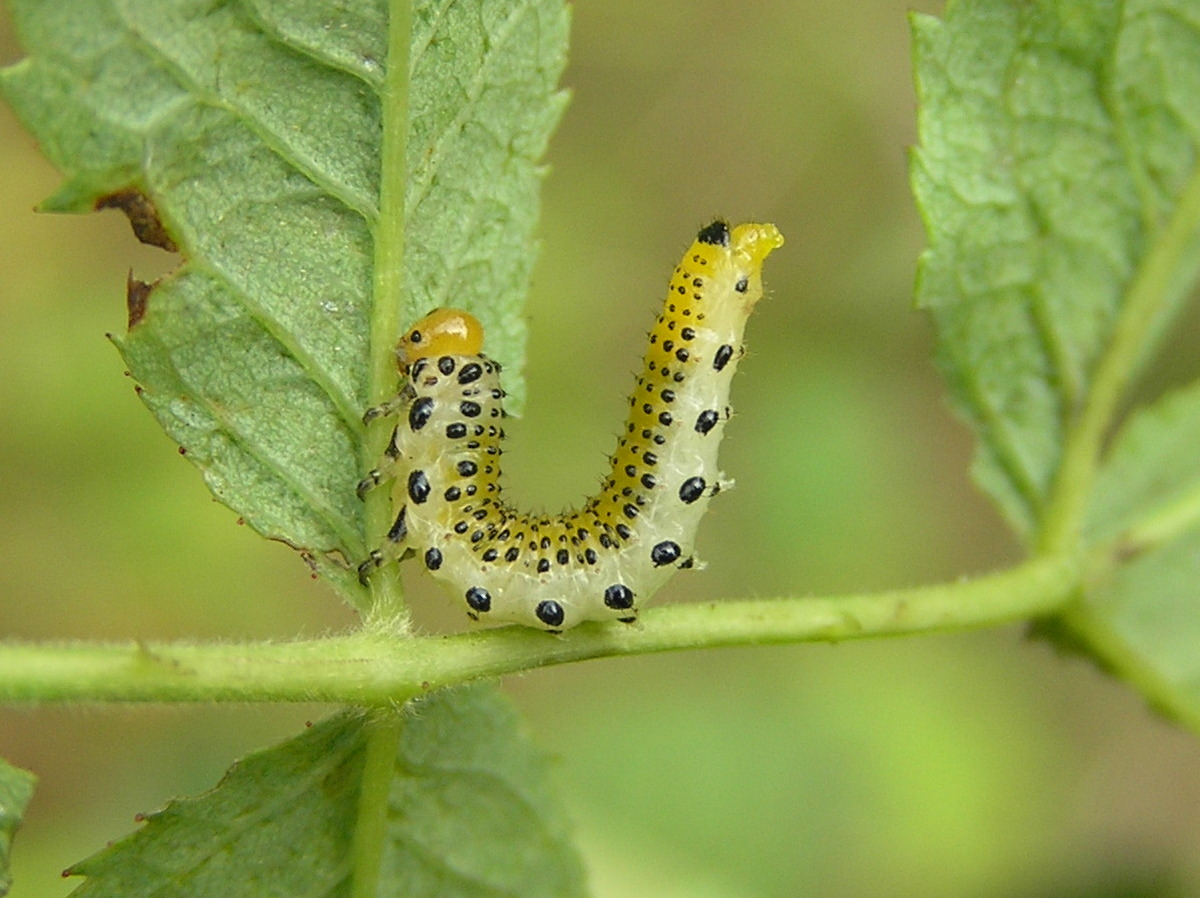
Larva
