= Antargidium =

Scientific classification
- Domain: Eukaryota
- Kingdom: Animalia
- Phylum: Arthropoda
- Class: Insecta
- Order: Hymenoptera
- Suborder: Symphyta
- Family: Argidae
- Genus: Antargidium; Morice, 1919

Genus of insects

Antargidium is a genus of sawfly belonging to the family Argidae. The distribution of the genus is limited to Australia.

== Species ==
The following species belong to the genus Antargidium:

- Antargidium allucente
- Antargidium apicale
- Antargidium atriceps
- Antargidium dentivalve
- Antargidium flavescens
- Antargidium nigrum
