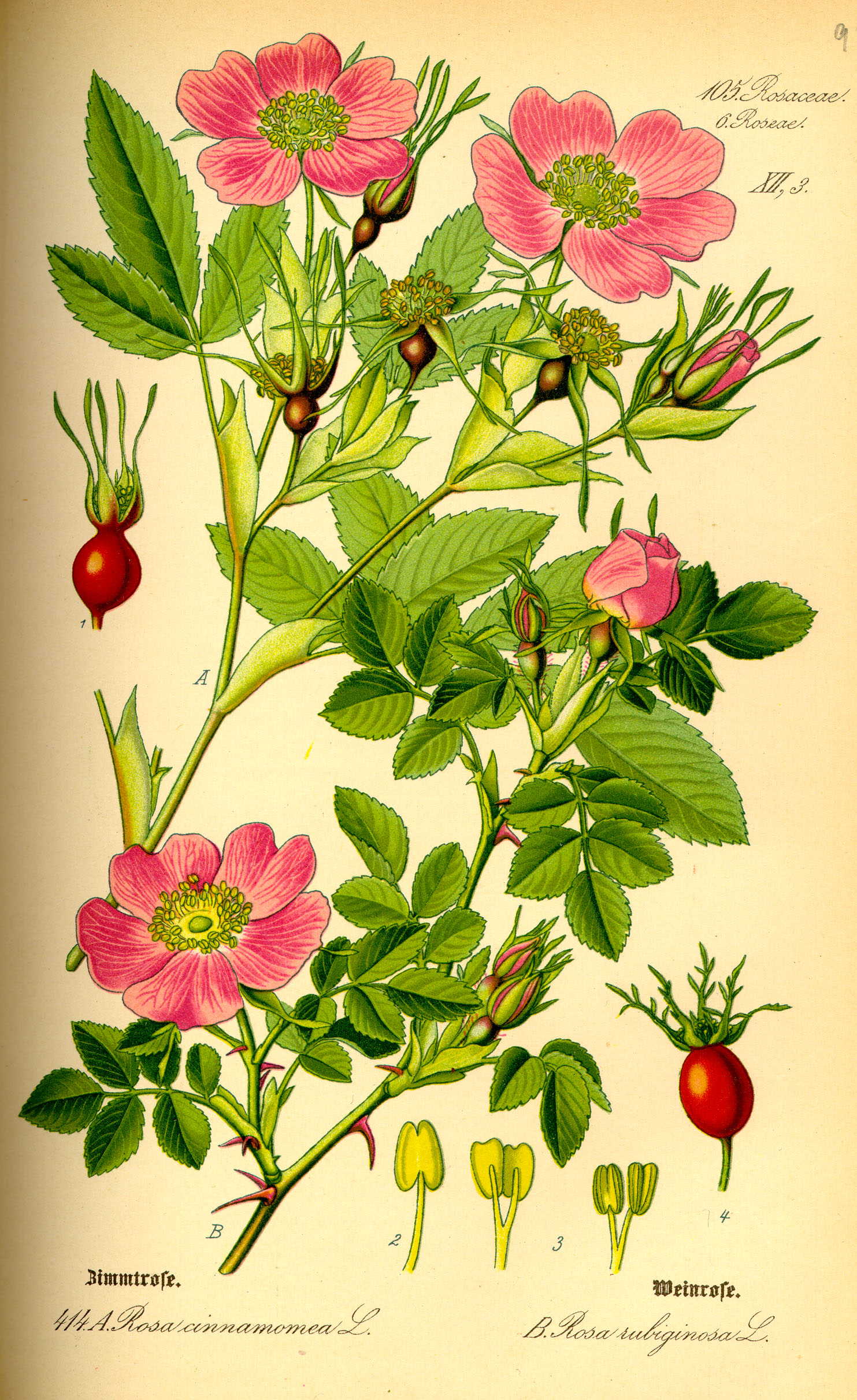

Scientific classification
- Kingdom: Plantae
- Clade: Embryophytes
- Clade: Tracheophytes
- Clade: Spermatophytes
- Clade: Angiosperms
- Clade: Eudicots
- Clade: Rosids
- Order: Rosales
- Family: Rosaceae
- Genus: Rosa
- Species: R. majalis

Binomial name
- Rosa majalis Herrm.

Synonyms
- Rosa cinnamomea L.

= Rosa majalis =

Species of flowering plant

Rosa majalis (syn. R. cinnamomea sensu L. 1759, non 1753; R. cinnamomea auct. non L.; cinnamon rose; double cinnamon rose) is a species of deciduous shrubs in the genus Rosa, native to forests of Europe and Siberia. It grows to 2 m. and yields edible hip fruits rich in vitamin C, which are used in medicine and to produce rose hip syrup.

It is native to Siberia and northern Europe. Its European distribution encompasses much of European Russia, the Baltic countries and Scandinavia (without Denmark), with more isolated occurrences in Central Europe, primarily in wet habitats in Ukraine, Belarus, Poland, Czech Republic, Germany and the Alps. It has a history of cultivation in gardens, which in Britain dates to the 16th century.

The binomial name Rosa majalis and its synonym Rosa cinnamomea are both ambiguous and have variously been applied to other species of Rosa.
