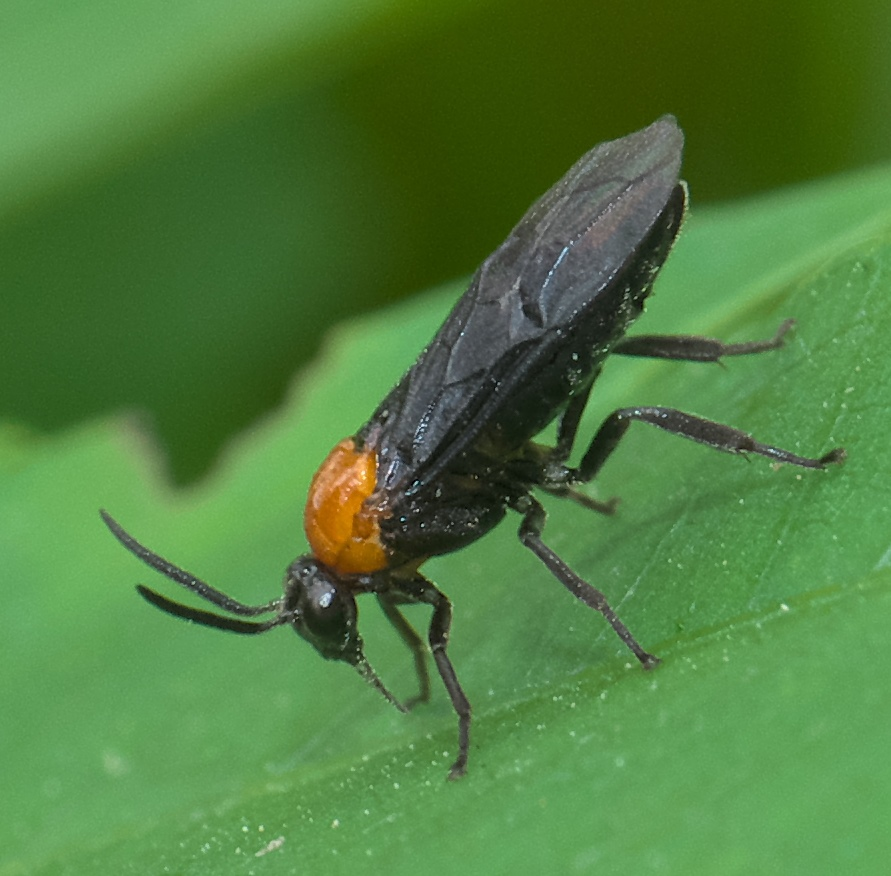
- Arge

Scientific classification
- Domain: Eukaryota
- Kingdom: Animalia
- Phylum: Arthropoda
- Class: Insecta
- Order: Hymenoptera
- Suborder: Symphyta
- Superfamily: Tenthredinoidea
- Family: Argidae
- Subfamily: Arginae

= Arginae =

Subfamily of sawflies

Arginae is a subfamily of argid sawflies in the family Argidae. There are about 12 genera and more than 400 described species in Arginae.

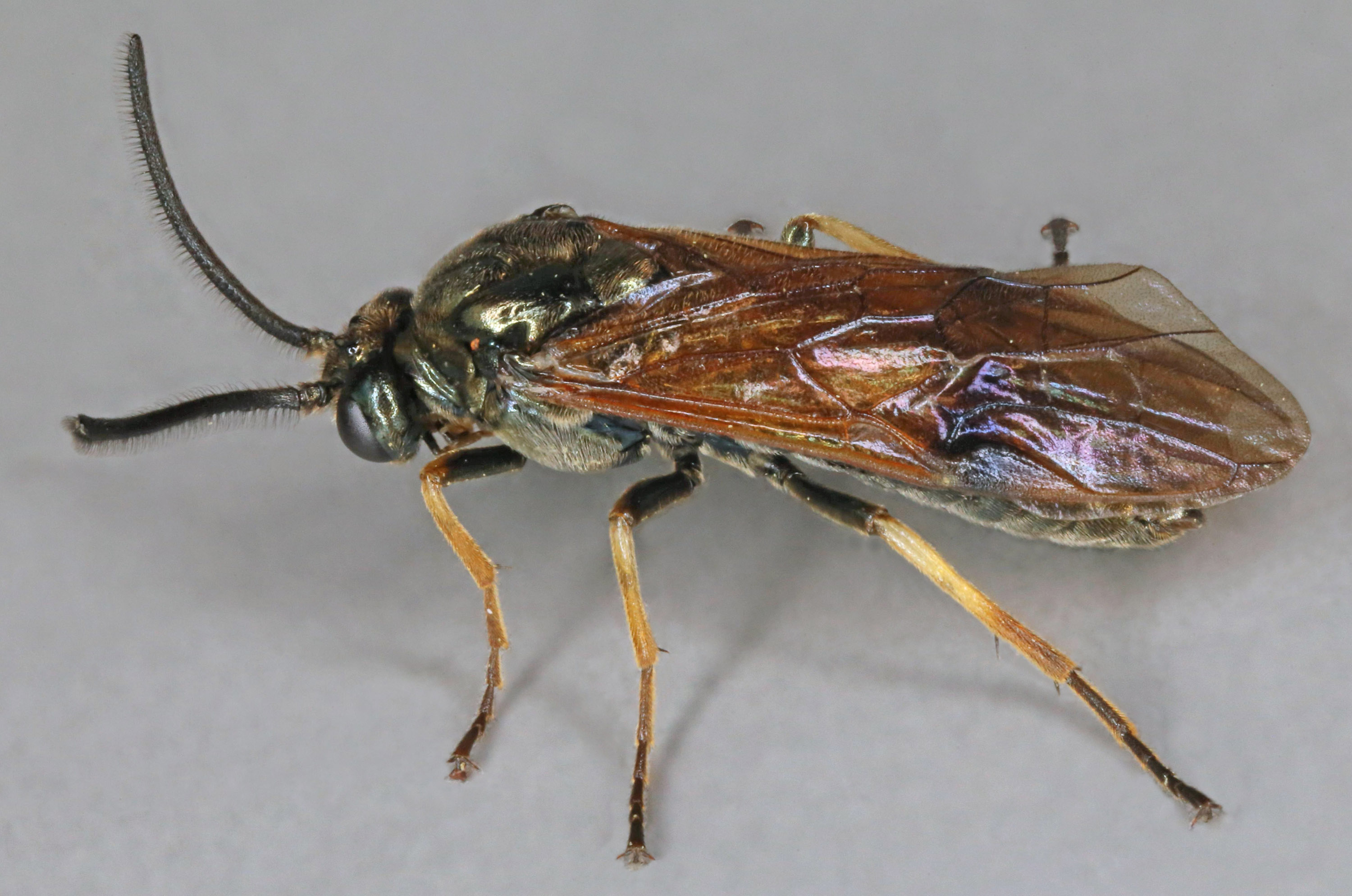
Arge ustulata

== Genera ==
These 12 genera belong to the subfamily Arginae:

- Antargidium Morice, 1919
- Arge Schrank, 1802
- Asiarge Gussakovskii, 1935
- Brevisceniana Wei, 2005
- Kokujewia Konow, 1902
- Pseudarge Gussakovskij, 1935
- Scobina Lepeletier & Serville, 1828
- Sjoestedtia Konow, 1907
- Spinarge Wei, 1998
- Triarge Forsius, 1931
- Zhuhongfuna
- †Mioarge Nel, 2004
