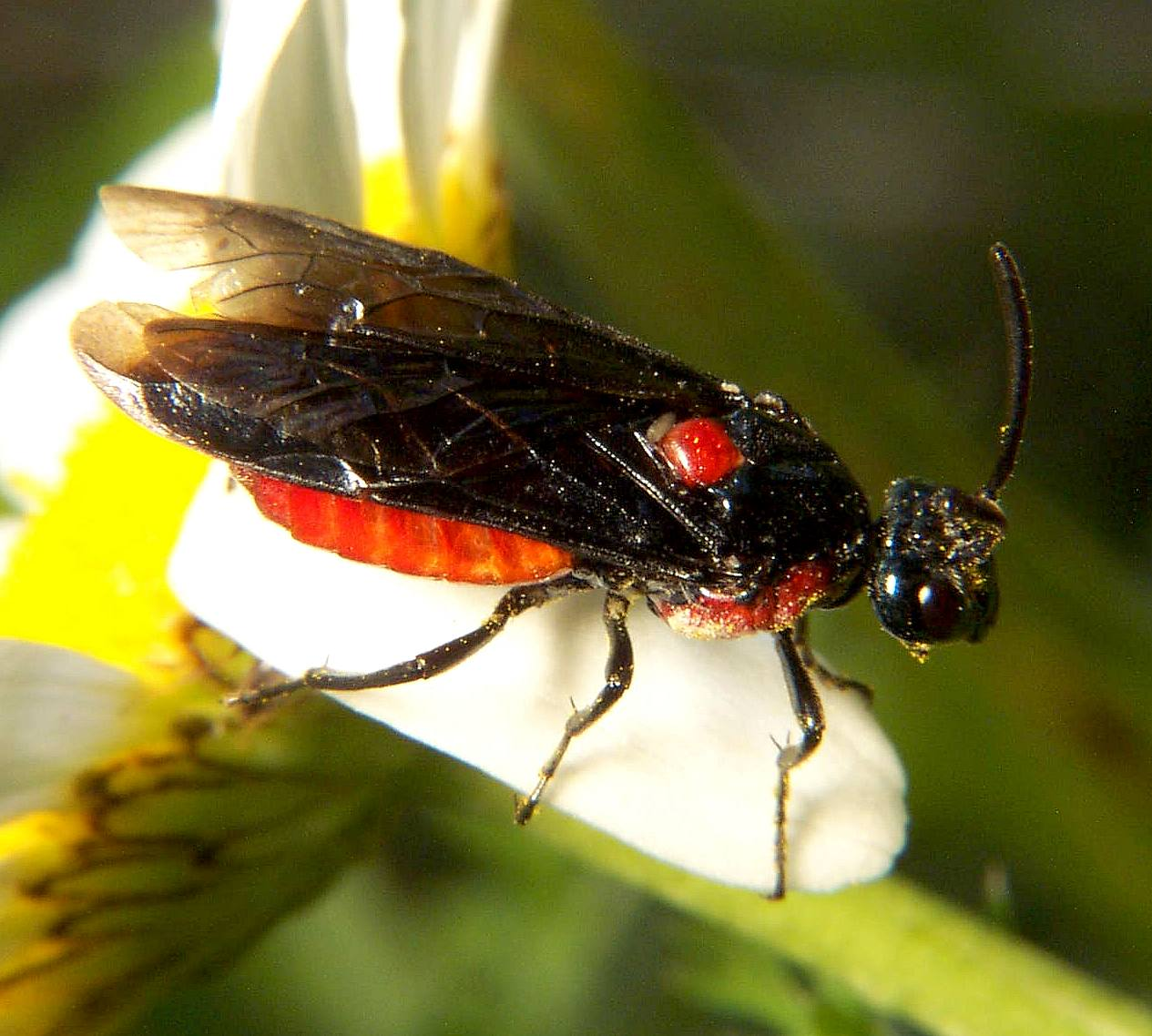
- Arge humeralis

Scientific classification
- Domain: Eukaryota
- Kingdom: Animalia
- Phylum: Arthropoda
- Class: Insecta
- Order: Hymenoptera
- Suborder: Symphyta
- Superfamily: Tenthredinoidea
- Family: Argidae; Konow, 1890

Subfamilies
- Arginae; Sterictiphorinae

= Argidae =

Family of sawflies

Argidae, commonly known as the argid sawflies, is a large family of sawflies, containing some 800 species worldwide, primarily in tropical regions. The larvae are phytophagous, and commonly can be found feeding (and often pupating) in groups, though very few attain pest status.

== Description ==
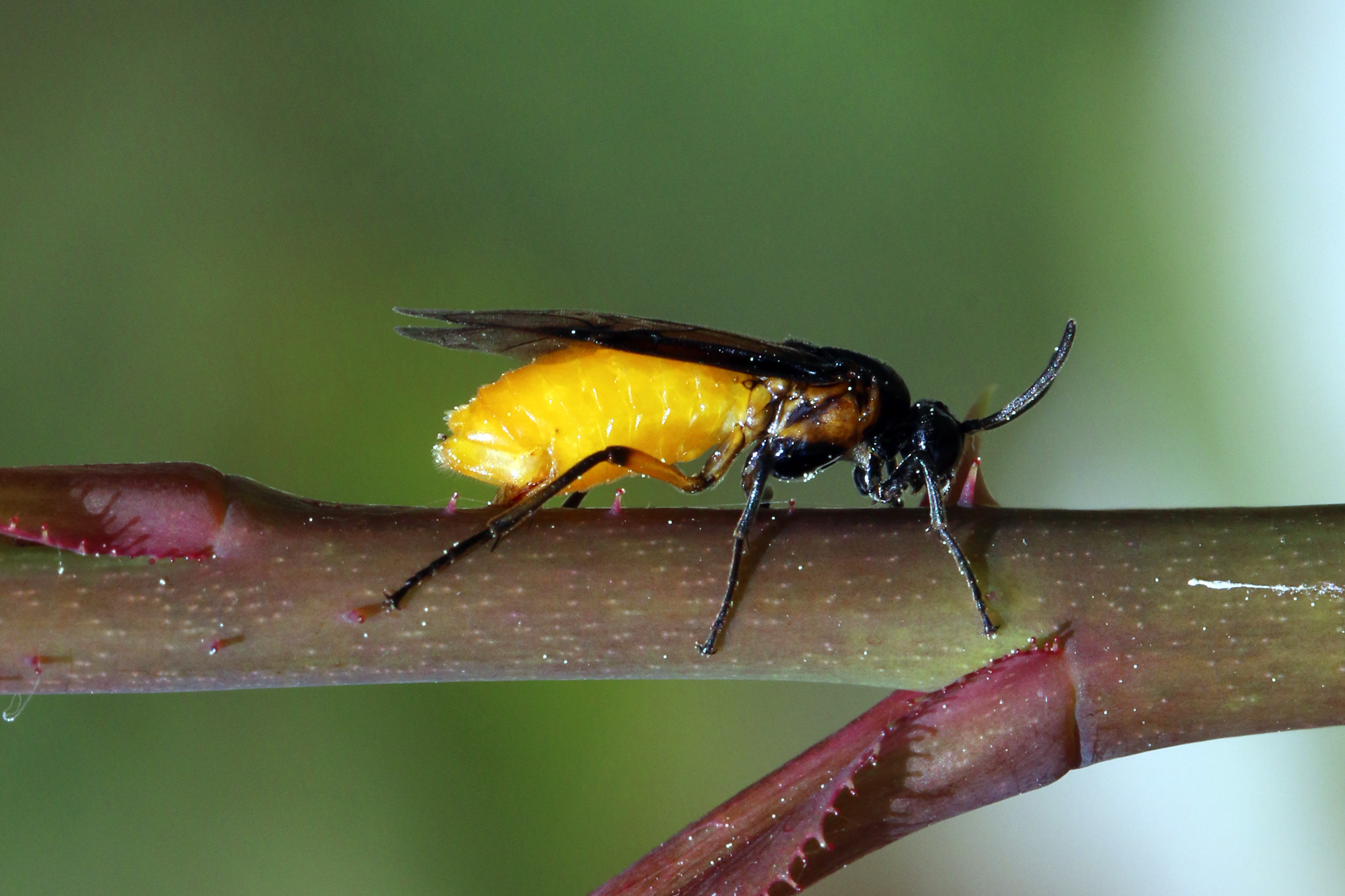
Large rose sawfly, a horticultural pest

The family is distinguished from all other Symphyta by the reduction of the antenna to three segments, flagellomeres; the last one is elongated often shaped like a tuning fork in males.

== Distribution ==
Species of this family are mainly found in the Neotropical region and in sub-Saharan Africa; however, this family is globally distributed.

== Genera ==
Argidae contains the following genera, split between its two subfamilies:

- Arginae
  - Antargidium Morice, 1919
  - Arge Schrank, 1802
  - Asiarge Gussakovskii, 1935
  - Brevisceniana Wei, 2005
  - Kokujewia Konow, 1902
  - †Mioarge Nel, 2004
  - Pseudarge Gussakovskij, 1935
  - Scobina Lepeletier & Serville, 1828
  - Sjoestedtia Konow, 1907
  - Spinarge Wei, 1998
  - Triarge Forsius, 1931
  - Zhuhongfuna
- Sterictiphorinae
  - Acrogymnia Malaise, 1941
  - Acrogymnidea Malaise, 1955
  - Adurgoa Malaise, 1937
  - Aproceros Malaise, 1931
  - Aprosthema Konow, 1899
  - Brachyphatnus Konow, 1906
  - Didymia Lepeletier, 1825
  - Duckeana Malaise, 1941
  - Durgoa Malaise, 1937
  - Manaos Rohwer, 1912
  - Neoptilia Ashmead, 1898
  - Ortasiceros Wei, 1997
  - Pseudaprosthema Gussakovskij, 1935
  - Ptenus Kirby, 1882
  - Ptilia Lepeletier, 1825
  - Schizocerella Forsius, 1927
  - Sphacophilus Provancher, 1888
  - Sterictiphora Billberg, 1820
  - Styphelarge Benson, 1938
  - Tanymeles Konow, 1906
  - Trailia Cameron, 1878
  - Trichorhachus Kirby, 1882
  - Triptenus Malaise, 1937
  - Trochophora Konow, 1905
  - Yasumatsua Togashi, 1970
  - Zynzus Smith, 1992
- incertae sedis
  - Atomacera Say, 1836
