= Dichelus holosquamosus =

Scientific classification
- Kingdom: Animalia
- Phylum: Arthropoda
- Class: Insecta
- Order: Coleoptera
- Suborder: Polyphaga
- Infraorder: Scarabaeiformia
- Family: Scarabaeidae
- Genus: Dichelus
- Species: D. holosquamosus

Binomial name
- Dichelus holosquamosus Schein, 1958

Species of beetle

Dichelus holosquamosus is a species of beetle of the family Scarabaeidae. It is found in South Africa (Western Cape).

== Description ==
Adults reach a length of about 6.5 mm (0.26 in). They are black and similar to Dichelus vittatus. The pronotum is the same as in Dichelus duplosquamosus and the elytra are uniformly yellowish and finely scaled.
