= Dichelus holosericeus =

Scientific classification
- Kingdom: Animalia
- Phylum: Arthropoda
- Clade: Pancrustacea
- Class: Insecta
- Order: Coleoptera
- Suborder: Polyphaga
- Infraorder: Scarabaeiformia
- Family: Scarabaeidae
- Genus: Dichelus
- Species: D. holosericeus

Binomial name
- Dichelus holosericeus (Burmeister, 1844)

Synonyms
- Heterochelus holosericeus Burmeister, 1844

Species of beetle

Dichelus holosericeus is a species of beetle of the family Scarabaeidae. It is found in South Africa (Western Cape, Eastern Cape).

== Description ==
Adults reach a length of about 5–5.5 mm (0.20–0.22 in). Males are similar to Dichelus simplicipes in shape, size and sculpture, the elytra, however, are redder, although they are also occasionally infuscate, or even black. The two white bands of scales are similar, and they are faintly punctured, with the punctures somewhat seriate. The scutellum has no scales, but it has often some flavescent, somewhat remote appressed hairs. The hind legs are, however, very different and similar those of Dichelus luctuosus. Females are black, with the elytra testaceous, the pygidium, abdomen and legs reddish. The elytra are deeply and broadly punctate and sparsely pubescent.
