= Dichelus acanthopus =

Scientific classification
- Kingdom: Animalia
- Phylum: Arthropoda
- Class: Insecta
- Order: Coleoptera
- Suborder: Polyphaga
- Infraorder: Scarabaeiformia
- Family: Scarabaeidae
- Genus: Dichelus
- Species: D. acanthopus

Binomial name
- Dichelus acanthopus (Burmeister, 1844)

Synonyms
- Heterochelus acanthopus Burmeister, 1844

Species of beetle

Dichelus acanthopus is a species of beetle of the family Scarabaeidae. It is found in South Africa (Western Cape).

== Description ==
Adults reach a length of about 5–6.5 mm (0.20–0.26 in). They are similar to Dichelus dentipes, but the facies is not so robust, the colour of the pronotum is slightly greenish black, that of the elytra varies also from red-brown to fuscous, but instead of having appressed hairs they only have a band of greyish-white ones not closely set and often partly obliterated. The pygidium of the females has two hairless lateral patches like the female of Dichelus expansus.
