= Hippopsis lineolatus =

Scientific classification
- Kingdom: Animalia
- Phylum: Arthropoda
- Class: Insecta
- Order: Coleoptera
- Suborder: Polyphaga
- Infraorder: Cucujiformia
- Family: Cerambycidae
- Genus: Hippopsis
- Species: H. lineolatus

Binomial name
- Hippopsis lineolatus Lepeletier & Aud.-Serville in Latreille, 1825

Species of beetle

Hippopsis lineolatus is a species of beetle in the family Cerambycidae. It was described by Amédée Louis Michel Lepeletier and Jean Guillaume Audinet-Serville in 1825.
