= Allodynerus rossii =

Scientific classification
- Kingdom: Animalia
- Phylum: Arthropoda
- Clade: Pancrustacea
- Class: Insecta
- Order: Hymenoptera
- Family: Vespidae
- Genus: Allodynerus
- Species: A. rossii

Binomial name
- Allodynerus rossii (Lepeletier, 1841)

Species of wasp

Allodynerus rossii is a species of wasp in the family Vespidae. It was described by Amédée Louis Michel Lepeletier in 1841 and listed in Catalogue of Life: 2011 Annual Checklist.
