= Tapeina =

Scientific classification
- Kingdom: Animalia
- Phylum: Arthropoda
- Clade: Pancrustacea
- Class: Insecta
- Order: Coleoptera
- Suborder: Polyphaga
- Infraorder: Cucujiformia
- Family: Cerambycidae
- Subfamily: Lamiinae
- Tribe: Tapeinini; Thomson, 1857
- Genus: Tapeina; Lepeletier & Audinet-Serville in Latreille, 1828

Synonyms
- Eurycephalus Gray in Griffith, 1831; Tapina Gemminger & Harold, 1873

Genus of beetles

Tapeina is a genus of Neotropical longhorn beetles (family Cerambycidae) in the subfamily Lamiinae. It is the only genus in the tribe Tapeinini.

== Species ==
- Tapeina bicolor Lepeletier & Audinet-Serville in Latreille, 1828
- Tapeina coronata Lep. & Aud.-Serv.in Latreille, 1828
- Tapeina dispar Lep. & Aud.-Serv., 1828
- Tapeina erectifrons Thomson, 1857
- Tapeina hylaeana Marinoni, 1972
- Tapeina melzeri Zajciw, 1966
- Tapeina paulista Marinoni, 1972
- Tapeina rubronigra Marinoni, 1972
- Tapeina rudifrons Marinoni, 1972
- Tapeina transversifrons Thomson, 1857
