= Dichelus peringueyi =

Scientific classification
- Kingdom: Animalia
- Phylum: Arthropoda
- Class: Insecta
- Order: Coleoptera
- Suborder: Polyphaga
- Infraorder: Scarabaeiformia
- Family: Scarabaeidae
- Genus: Dichelus
- Species: D. peringueyi

Binomial name
- Dichelus peringueyi Schein, 1958

Species of beetle

Dichelus peringueyi is a species of beetle of the family Scarabaeidae. It is found in South Africa (Cape).

== Description ==
Adults reach a length of about 7–7.5 mm (0.28–0.30 in). They are similar to Dichelus vittatus, but the hairs on the head and pronotum are light and the legs are reddish-brown.
