= Euryptera latipennis =

Scientific classification
- Kingdom: Animalia
- Phylum: Arthropoda
- Class: Insecta
- Order: Coleoptera
- Suborder: Polyphaga
- Infraorder: Cucujiformia
- Family: Cerambycidae
- Genus: Euryptera
- Species: E. latipennis

Binomial name
- Euryptera latipennis Lepeletier & Aud.-Serville in Latreille, 1828

Species of beetle

Euryptera latipennis is a species of beetle in the family Cerambycidae. It was described by Amédée Louis Michel Lepeletier and Jean Guillaume Audinet-Serville in 1828.
