= Scobina =

Scientific classification
- Domain: Eukaryota
- Kingdom: Animalia
- Phylum: Arthropoda
- Class: Insecta
- Order: Hymenoptera
- Suborder: Symphyta
- Family: Argidae
- Genus: Scobina; Lepeletier de Saint Fargeau & Audinet-Serville, 1828

Species
- See species

Genus of insects

Scobina is a genus of sawfly belonging to the Argidae family that is present in South America, Central America and Mexico.

== Species ==
The following species belong to the genus Scobina:

- Scobina bolivari (Konow, 1899) Konow, 1899
- Scobina inculta (Konow, 1906) Lepeletier de Saint Fargeau & Audinet-Serville, 1828
- Scobina lepida (Klug)
- Scobina melanocephala (Lepeletier de Saint Fargeau, 1823)
- Scobina notaticollis (Konow, 1899) Lepeletier de Saint Fargeau & Audinet-Serville, 1828
- Scobina strophosa (Konow, 1906) Lepeletier de Saint Fargeau & Audinet-Serville, 1828
- Scobina styx Malaise, 1949
- Scobina terminalis
- Scobina thoracica
