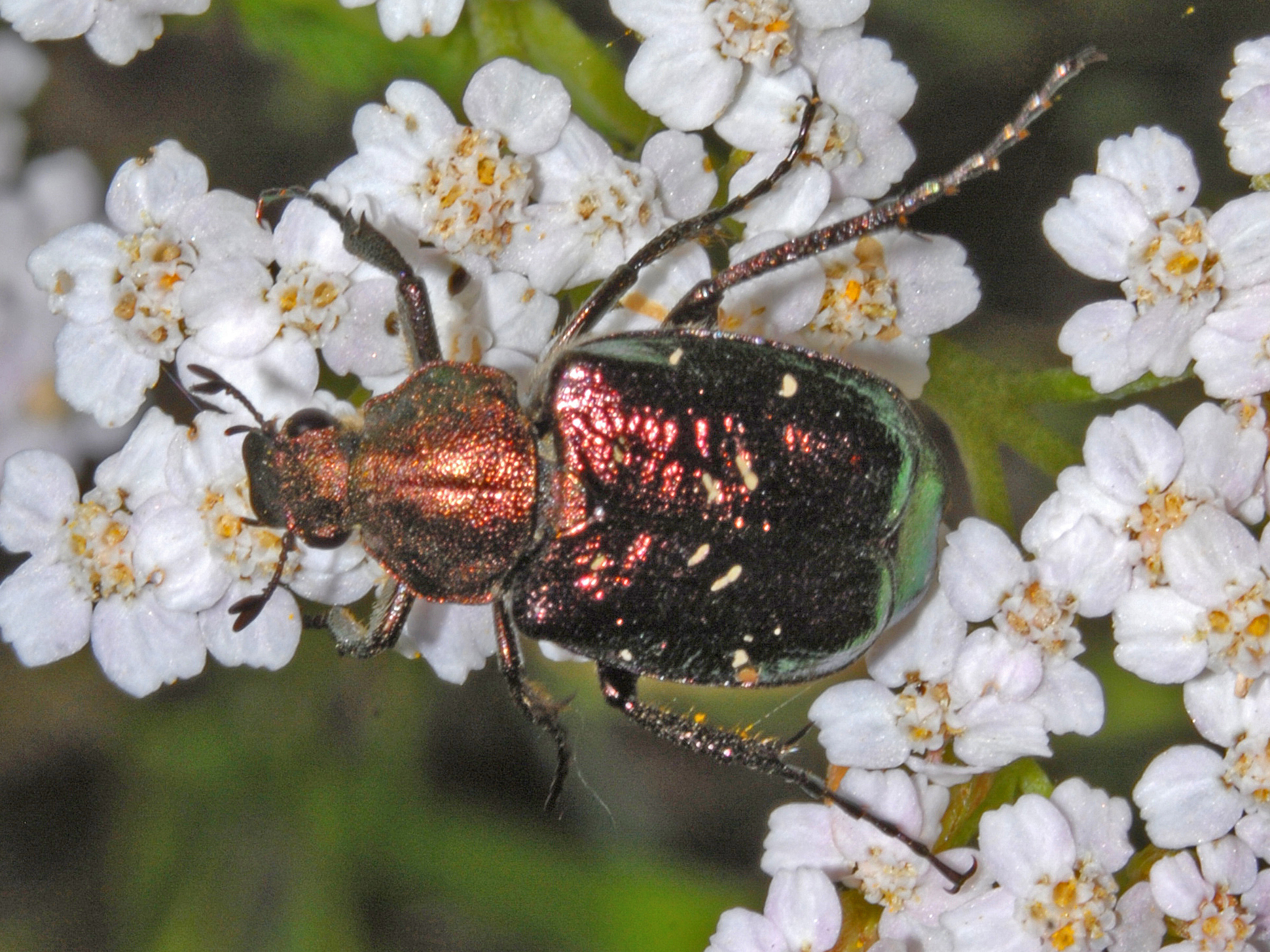
- Gnorimus nobilis

Scientific classification
- Kingdom: Animalia
- Phylum: Arthropoda
- Clade: Pancrustacea
- Class: Insecta
- Order: Coleoptera
- Suborder: Polyphaga
- Infraorder: Scarabaeiformia
- Family: Scarabaeidae
- Subfamily: Cetoniinae
- Tribe: Trichiini
- Genus: Gnorimus; Lepeletier & Audinet-Serville, 1828

Synonyms
- Aleurostictus Kirby, 1827; Trichius (Aleurostictus) Kirby, 1827

= Gnorimus =

Genus of beetles

Gnorimus is genus of beetles belonging to the family Scarabaeidae, subfamily Cetoniinae.

== Etymology ==
The genus name Gnorimus derives from the ancient Greek γνώριμος, gnōrimos meaning 'famous'.

== Species ==
- †Gnorimus aedilis (Heer, 1862)
- Gnorimus armeniacus Reitter, 1887
- Gnorimus baborensis Bedel, 1919
- Gnorimus bartelsi Faldermann, 1836
- Gnorimus decempunctatus Helfer, 1833
- †Gnorimus lugubris (Heer, 1862)
- Gnorimus nobilis (Linnaeus, 1758)
- Gnorimus subcostatus (Ménétriés, 1832)
- Gnorimus subopacus Motschulsky, 1860
- Gnorimus thoracicus Hanuš, 1862
- Gnorimus variabilis (Linnaeus, 1758)
