= Euryptera =

Scientific classification
- Kingdom: Animalia
- Phylum: Arthropoda
- Clade: Pancrustacea
- Class: Insecta
- Order: Coleoptera
- Suborder: Polyphaga
- Infraorder: Cucujiformia
- Family: Cerambycidae
- Subfamily: Lepturinae
- Tribe: Lepturini
- Genus: Euryptera; Lepeletier & Audinet-Serville in Latreille, 1828

Genus of beetles

Euryptera is a genus of beetles in the family Cerambycidae, containing the following species:

- Euryptera albosterna Chemsak & Linsley, 1974
- Euryptera latipennis Lepeletier & Aud.-Serville in Latreille, 1828
- Euryptera leonina Gounelle, 1911
- Euryptera nigrosuturalis Melzer, 1935
- Euryptera sabinoensis Knull, 1952
- Euryptera unilineatocollis Fuchs, 1956
