= Chasme jucunda =

Scientific classification
- Kingdom: Animalia
- Phylum: Arthropoda
- Class: Insecta
- Order: Coleoptera
- Suborder: Polyphaga
- Infraorder: Scarabaeiformia
- Family: Scarabaeidae
- Genus: Chasme
- Species: C. jucunda

Binomial name
- Chasme jucunda Péringuey, 1902

Species of beetle

Chasme jucunda is a species of beetle of the family Scarabaeidae. It is found in South Africa (Western Cape).

== Description ==
Adults reach a length of about 7 mm (0.28 in). They are similar to Chasme decora, but narrower and the scales are paler. The head and pronotum are similarly shaped, but the hairs are very short and appressed. Furthermore, the elytra have only a few sub-appressed black, bristle-like hairs, and those along the suture and the outer margins are also shorter. Instead of being entirely clothed with the yellow scales, each elytron has one broad sutural and one marginal band, and a median one which stops at some distance from the apex. The pygidium is densely squamose and somewhat hairy and its scales are yellow, but turn to white on the abdomen. The legs are black.
