= Dichelus parentalis =

Scientific classification
- Kingdom: Animalia
- Phylum: Arthropoda
- Class: Insecta
- Order: Coleoptera
- Suborder: Polyphaga
- Infraorder: Scarabaeiformia
- Family: Scarabaeidae
- Genus: Dichelus
- Species: D. parentalis

Binomial name
- Dichelus parentalis (Péringuey, 1902)

Synonyms
- Heterochelus parentalis Péringuey, 1902

Species of beetle

Dichelus parentalis is a species of beetle of the family Scarabaeidae. It is found in South Africa (Western Cape).

== Description ==
Adults reach a length of about 6 mm (0.24 in). They are very similar to Dichelus timidus. The sculpture and vestiture of the head and pronotum are the same, but the elytra are redder (but also slightly infuscate behind), very rugose, and have similar appressed sub-squamiform hairs turning to yellow scales on the apical margin. The propygidium and pygidium are clothed with dense sub-lanuginose scales.
