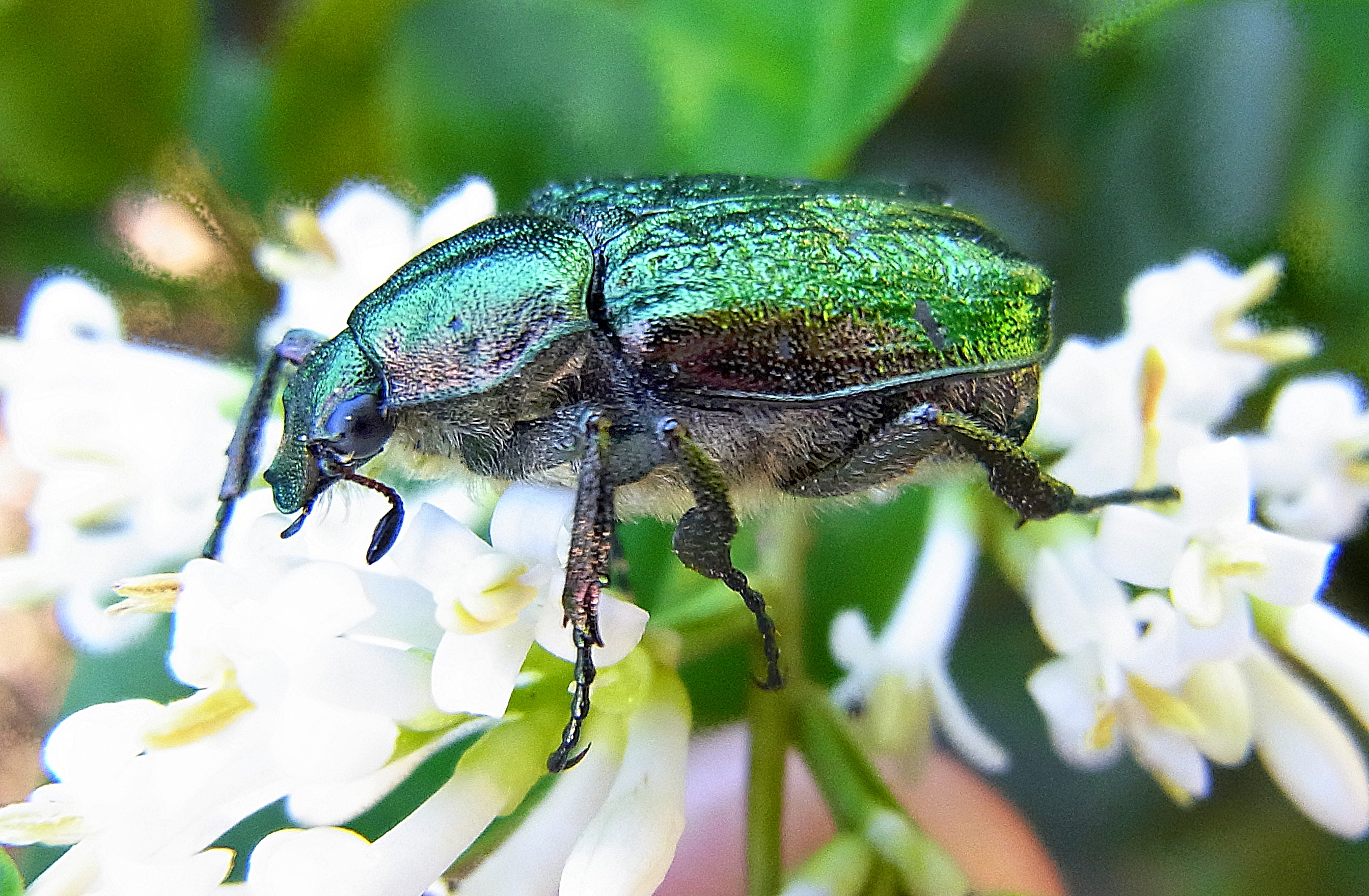
- Gnorimus nobilis. Side view

Scientific classification
- Kingdom: Animalia
- Phylum: Arthropoda
- Clade: Pancrustacea
- Class: Insecta
- Order: Coleoptera
- Suborder: Polyphaga
- Infraorder: Scarabaeiformia
- Family: Scarabaeidae
- Genus: Gnorimus
- Species: G. nobilis

Binomial name
- Gnorimus nobilis (Linnaeus, 1758)

Synonyms
- Scarabaeus nobilis Linnaeus, 1758; Aleurostictus nobilis dutruei Tauzin, 2004; Gnorimus nobilis holonigra Brustel, 1998; Gnorimus nobilis lecapitaini Brustel, 1998; Gnorimus nobilis annikae Bidault, 1997; Gnorimus nobilis magdaleinei Moretto, 1978; Gnorimus nobilis remyanus Darnaud, 1978; Gnorimus nobilis ignitum Mikšić, 1954; Gnorimus nobilis sonjae Mikšić, 1954; Gnorimus nobilis subparallelus Pic, 1945; Gnorimus nobilis basipennis Pic, 1942; Gnorimus nobilis fleischeri Jesatko, 1942; Gnorimus nobilis heyrovskyi Jesatko, 1942; Gnorimus nobilis maximovici Jesatko, 1942; Gnorimus nobilis obenbergeri Jesatko, 1942; Gnorimus nobilis roubali Jesatko, 1942; Gnorimus nobilis semicupreus Pic, 1942; Gnorimus nobilis serbusi Jesatko, 1942; Gnorimus nobilis stusaki Jesatko, 1942; Gnorimus nobilis tesari Jesatko, 1942; Gnorimus nobilis tatari Jesatko, 1938; Gnorimus nobilis superbissima Roubal, 1933; Gnorimus nobilis cyaneoviolaceus Mancini, 1924; Gnorimus nobilis viridissimus Depoli, 1917; Gnorimus nobilis purpureus Depoli, 1912; Gnorimus nobilis cuprifulgens Reitter, 1908; Gnorimus nobilis obscuripennis Reitter, 1908; Gnorimus nobilis cupreicollis Mulsant, 1842; Gnorimus nobilis immaculatus Mulsant, 1842; Gnorimus nobilis rubrocupreus Mulsant, 1842; Scarabaeus auratus Schrank, 1781; Scarabaeus viridulus Degeer, 1774; Scarabaeus igneus Voet, 1769

= Noble chafer =

Species of beetle

The noble chafer (Gnorimus nobilis) is a species of beetles belonging to the family Scarabaeidae, subfamily Cetoniinae.

== Etymology ==
The genus name Gnorimus derives from the ancient Greek γνώριμος, gnōrimos meaning 'famous'. The species name nobilis (Latin) means noble.

== Distribution ==
This species is widespread in most of Europe (Albania, Austria, Belarus, Belgium, Bosnia and Herzegovina, Bulgaria, Croatia, Czech Republic, Denmark, Estonia, France, Germany, Greece, Hungary, Italy, Latvia, Liechtenstein, Luxembourg, Montenegro, Netherlands, North Macedonia, Norway, Poland, Portugal, Romania, Russia, Serbia, Slovakia, Slovenia, Spain, Sweden, Switzerland, Turkey, Ukraine and United Kingdom). It seems to be declining over much of its European range. In Britain this beetle has been losing its habitat, and its populations shrinking, for more than a century. The beetle has been recently seen at a handful of sites in the old English fruit-growing regions of Gloucestershire, Herefordshire and Worcestershire.

== Habitat ==
This species mainly inhabits both the plains and the mountains. It prefers open, deciduous woods and forests and it is associated with dead wood. In the UK, however, it often can be found in old fruit orchards.

== Species and varietas ==
Subspecies and varietas include:

- Gnorimus nobilis bolshakovi (Gusakov, 2002)
- Gnorimus nobilis macedonicus Baraud, 1992
- Gnorimus nobilis nobilis (Linnaeus, 1758)
- Gnorimus nobilis var. cuprifulgens Reitter, 1908
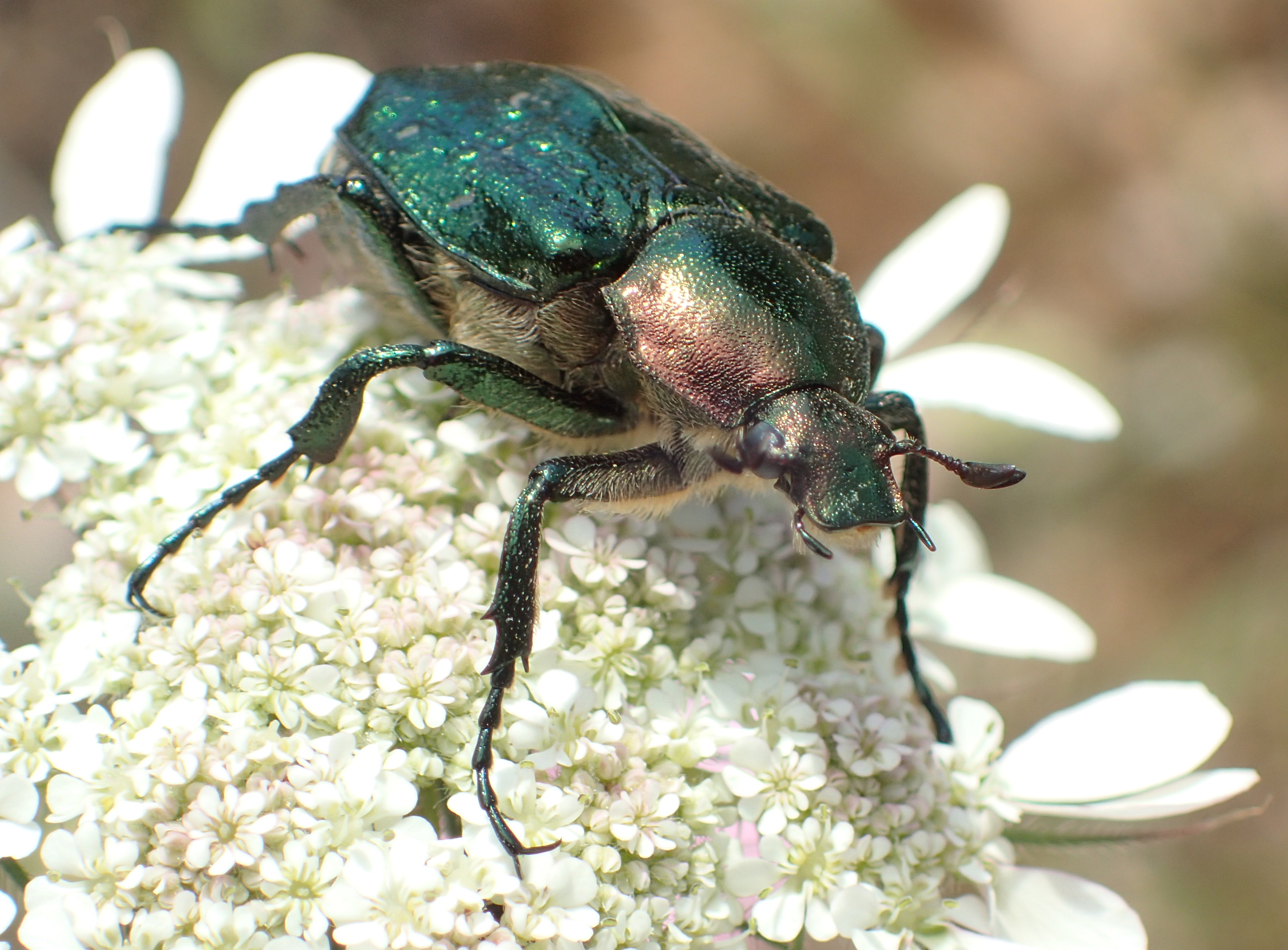
Gnorimus nobilis macedonicus

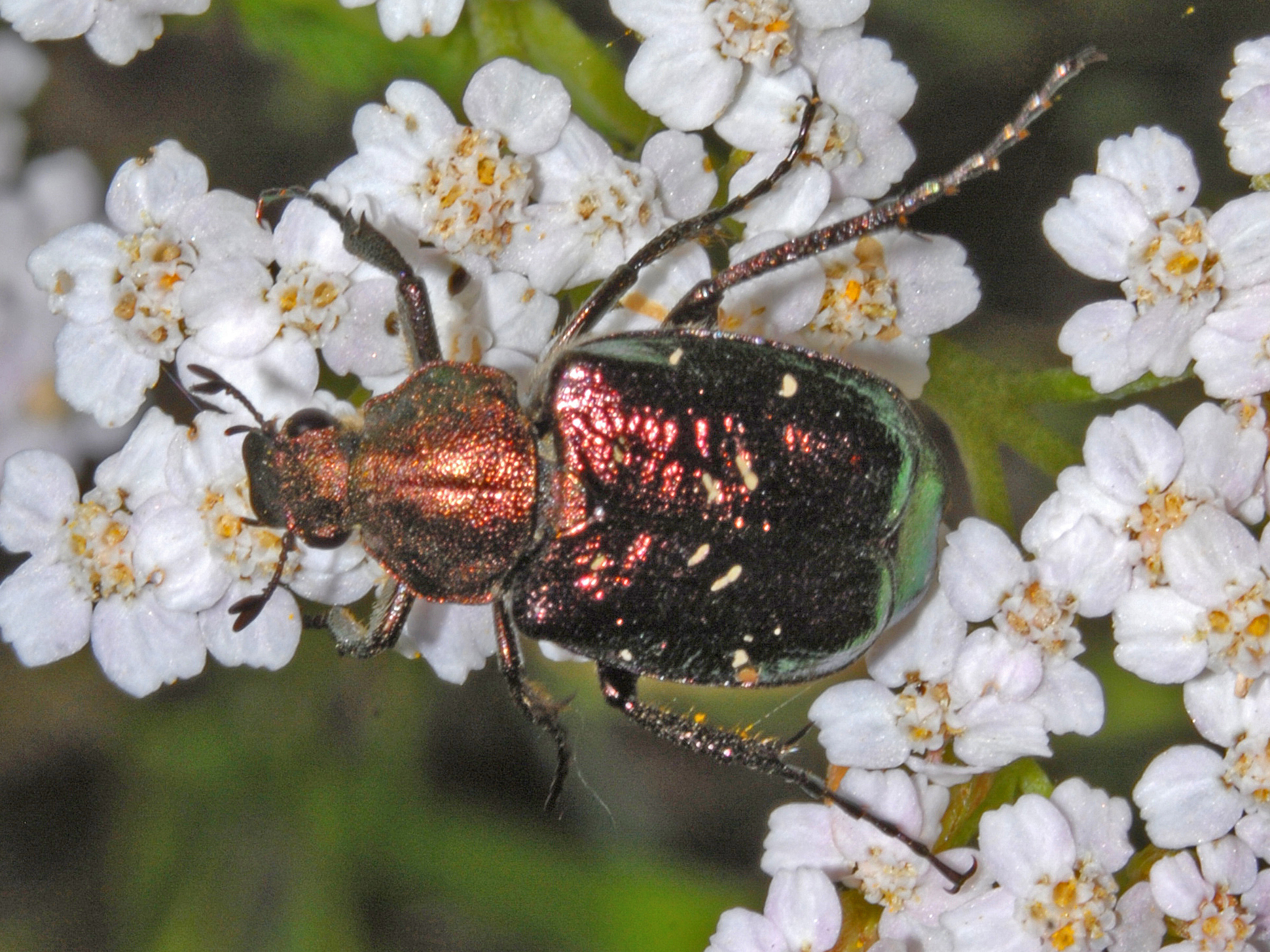
Gnorimus nobilis var. cuprifulgens

== Description ==
Gnorimus nobilis can reach approximately a body length of 15–19 millimetres (0.59–0.75 in). These beetles have the pronotum and head covered with dense medium-sized dots. Elytra are covered with dense, coarse wrinkles and small, small dots. They have a green metallic-green body speckled with white. They show a brilliant iridescence that can vary from gold to copper or violet. The sides of the abdomen and the pygidium are also gold-green with large white spots. The bottom side varies from bright coppery to black.

The related species Gnorimus variabilis is easily distinguishable. In this species the elytra are not green metallic, but black, with white spots. In addition, the shape of the pronotum side edge is laterally weakly s-shaped, while in Gnorimus nobilis it is simply rounded.

Gnorimus nobilis is also rather similar to the more common Cetonia aurata, but in the latter the middle and hind legs are toothed, whereas they are smooth in the Gnorinus nobilis. Moreover in the noble chafer the scutellum forms an equilateral triangle.

== Biology ==
The adults can be found from May until early August, most often on warm sunny days between July and August. Adult beetles feed on nectar and pollen on flower heads, especially umbellifers, such as common hogweed (Heracleum sphondylium). Females lay their eggs on rotting wood on the trunks of old trees, especially ancient oaks. This species spends most of its life as a grub, living in the rotting wood of old trees, mainly willow, poplar, oak and fruit trees. Larvae grow to a length up to 48 mm and take two years before pupating. In their second summer adults comes out to breed, before dying in the early autumn.

== Life cycle ==
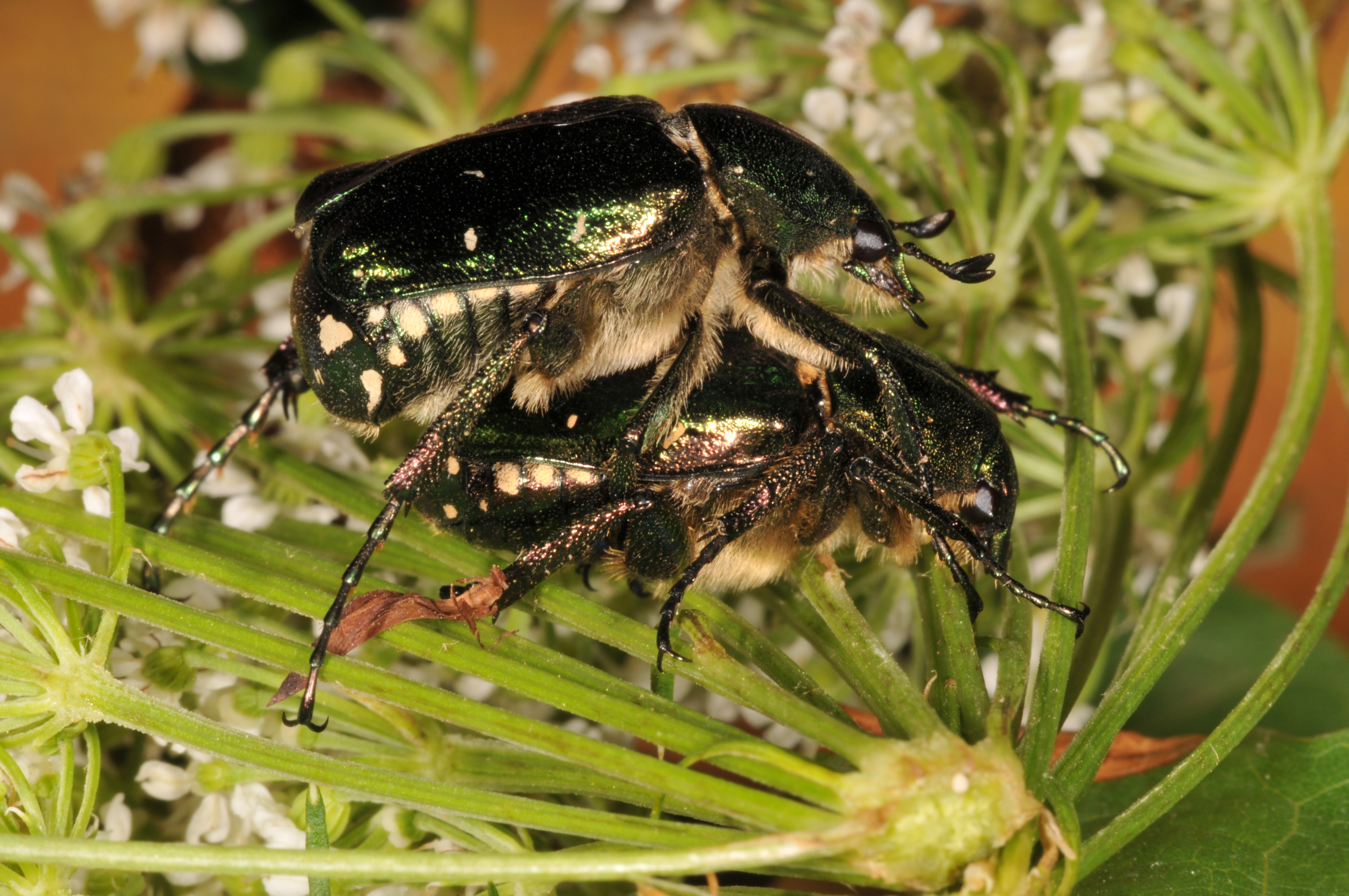
Mating couple

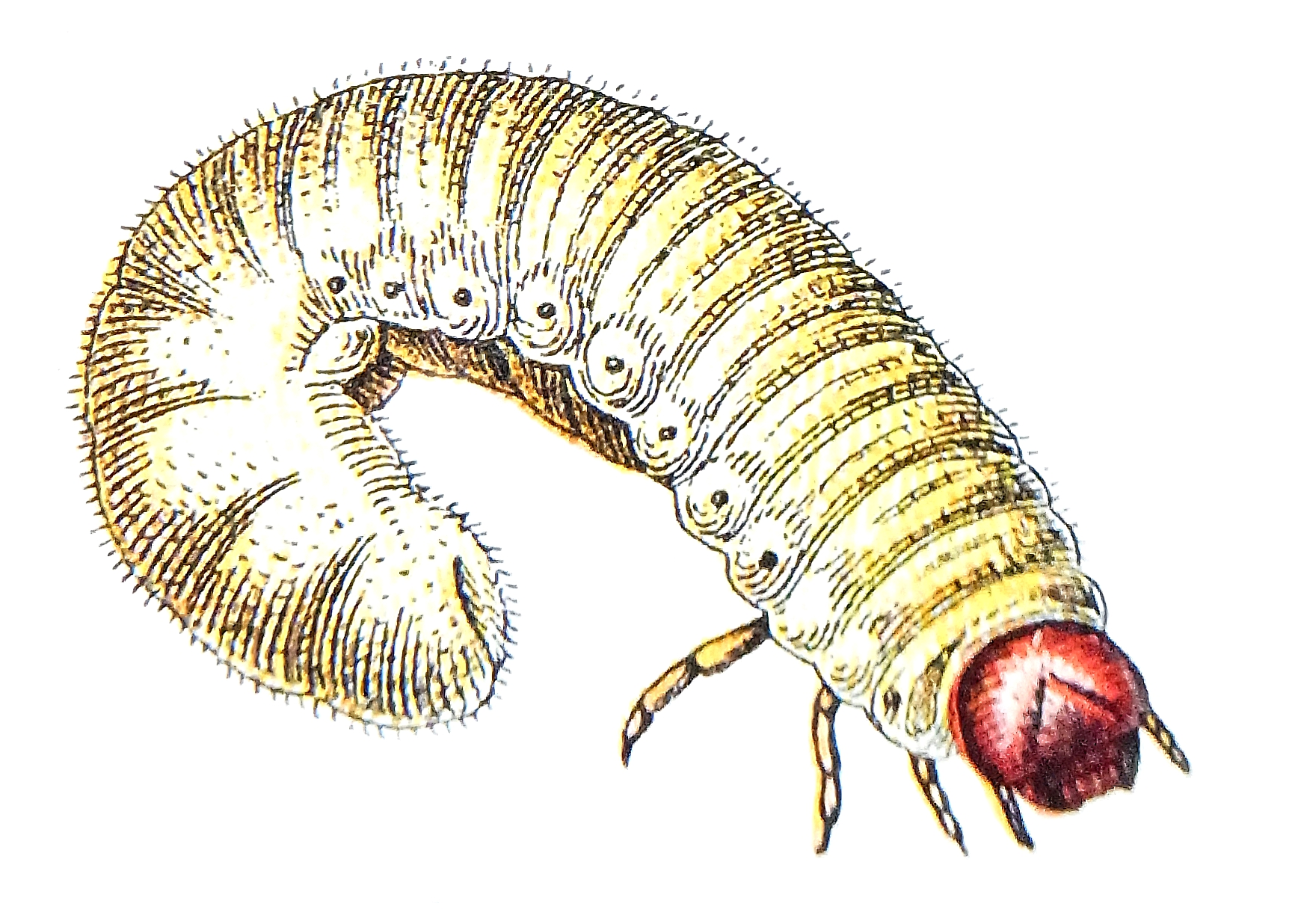
Larva

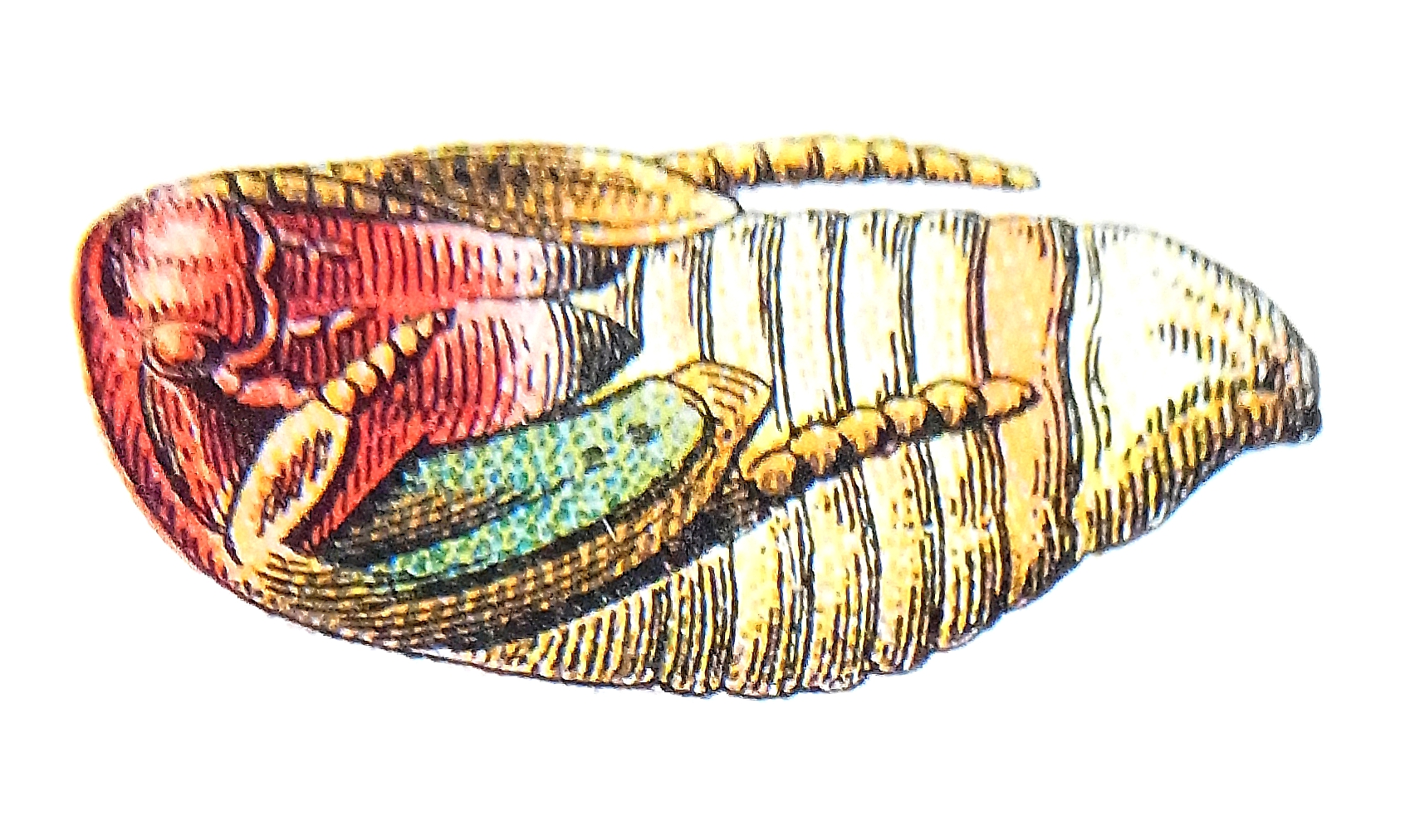
Pupa

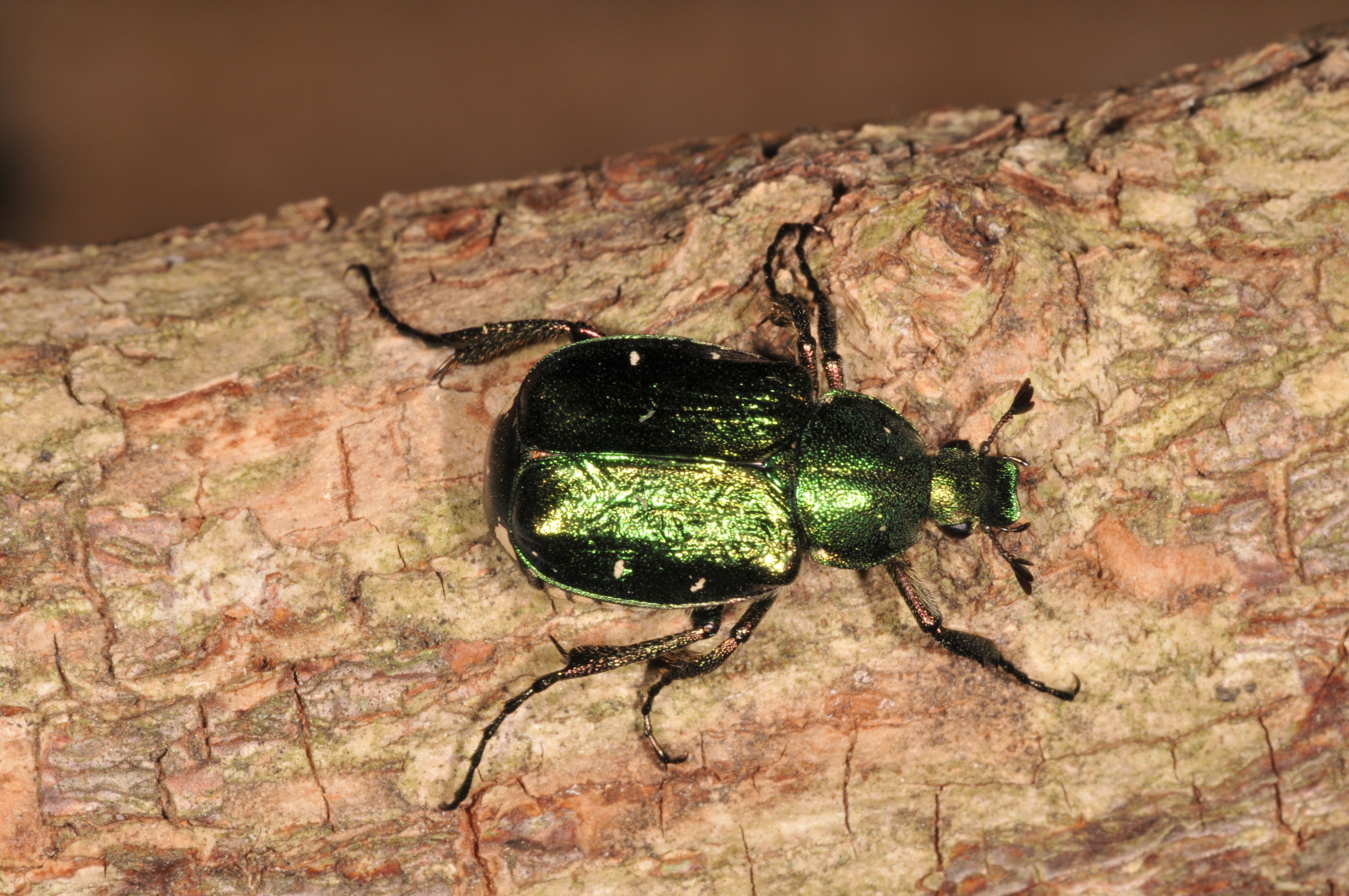
Imago
