= Dichelus =

Scientific classification
- Kingdom: Animalia
- Phylum: Arthropoda
- Class: Insecta
- Order: Coleoptera
- Suborder: Polyphaga
- Infraorder: Scarabaeiformia
- Family: Scarabaeidae
- Subfamily: Melolonthinae
- Tribe: Hopliini
- Genus: Dichelus; Le Peletier & Audinet-Serville, 1828

Synonyms
- Trichidius Billberg, 1820

Genus beetles

Dichelus is a genus of beetles belonging to the family Scarabaeidae.

== Species ==
- subgenus Dichelus
  - Dichelus acanthopus (Burmeister, 1844)
  - Dichelus albolineatus Schein, 1958
  - Dichelus dentipes (Fabricius, 1781)
  - Dichelus duplosquamosus Schein, 1958
  - Dichelus expansus Péringuey, 1902
  - Dichelus femoratus (Thunberg, 1818)
  - Dichelus flavimanus (Burmeister, 1855)
  - Dichelus holosericeus (Burmeister, 1844)
  - Dichelus holosquamosus Schein, 1958
  - Dichelus laticollis (Burmeister, 1844)
  - Dichelus lucidus Péringuey, 1902
  - Dichelus luctuosus Péringuey, 1902
  - Dichelus minor Schein, 1958
  - Dichelus niger (Wiedemann, 1821)
  - Dichelus nitidissimus (Burmeister, 1844)
  - Dichelus pallidipennis (Blanchard, 1850)
  - Dichelus peringueyi Schein, 1958
  - Dichelus platynotus (Burmeister, 1844)
  - Dichelus pseudoluctuosus Schein, 1958
  - Dichelus pseudovittatus Schein, 1958
  - Dichelus simplicipes (Burmeister, 1844)
  - Dichelus villosus (Burmeister, 1844)
  - Dichelus vittatus (Burmeister, 1844)
  - Dichelus zuluanus Péringuey, 1902
- subgenus Ischnochelus Burmeister, 1844
  - Dichelus andreaei Kulzer, 1960
  - Dichelus bipartitus (Burmeister, 1844)
  - Dichelus collaris Kulzer, 1960
  - Dichelus emeritus (Péringuey, 1902)
  - Dichelus fulvipennis Kulzer, 1960
  - Dichelus griseus (Péringuey, 1908)
  - Dichelus lugubris Kulzer, 1960
  - Dichelus minimus Kulzer, 1960
  - Dichelus minutus (Burmeister, 1844)
  - Dichelus parentalis (Péringuey, 1902)
  - Dichelus parvulus (Burmeister, 1844)
  - Dichelus pauperatus (Burmeister, 1844)
  - Dichelus praestabilis (Péringuey, 1902)
  - Dichelus puerilis (Péringuey, 1902)
  - Dichelus purelli Kulzer, 1960
  - Dichelus sulcatus (Burmeister, 1844)
  - Dichelus tibialis Kulzer, 1960
  - Dichelus timidus (Burmeister, 1844)
  - Dichelus wittei (Schein, 1959)
