= Chasme (beetle) =

Scientific classification
- Kingdom: Animalia
- Phylum: Arthropoda
- Class: Insecta
- Order: Coleoptera
- Suborder: Polyphaga
- Infraorder: Scarabaeiformia
- Family: Scarabaeidae
- Subfamily: Melolonthinae
- Tribe: Hopliini
- Genus: Chasme; Le Peletier, 1828

Genus of leaf beetles

Chasme is a genus of beetles belonging to the family Scarabaeidae.

== Species ==
- Chasme decora (Wiedemann, 1823)
- Chasme jucunda Péringuey, 1902
- Chasme kochi Schein, 1959
