= Tapeina coronata =

Scientific classification
- Kingdom: Animalia
- Phylum: Arthropoda
- Class: Insecta
- Order: Coleoptera
- Suborder: Polyphaga
- Infraorder: Cucujiformia
- Family: Cerambycidae
- Genus: Tapeina
- Species: T. coronata

Binomial name
- Tapeina coronata Lepeletier & Audinet-Serville in Latreille, 1828

Synonyms
- Tapeina picea Lepeletier & Audinet-Serville, 1828; Eurycephalus niger Gray, 1831

Species of beetle

Tapeina coronata is a species of beetle in the family Cerambycidae. It was described by Amédée Louis Michel Lepeletier and Jean Guillaume Audinet-Serville in 1828. It is known from Brazil, Argentina, and Paraguay.

== Subspecies ==
- Tapeina coronata integra Marinoni, 1972
- Tapeina coronata coronata Lepeletier & Audinet-Serville in Latreille, 1828
