= Dichelus villosus =

Scientific classification
- Kingdom: Animalia
- Phylum: Arthropoda
- Class: Insecta
- Order: Coleoptera
- Suborder: Polyphaga
- Infraorder: Scarabaeiformia
- Family: Scarabaeidae
- Genus: Dichelus
- Species: D. villosus

Binomial name
- Dichelus villosus (Burmeister, 1844)

Synonyms
- Heterochelus villosus Burmeister, 1844

Species of beetle

Dichelus villosus is a species of beetle of the family Scarabaeidae. It is found in South Africa (Western Cape, Northern Cape, Limpopo).

== Description ==
Adults reach a length of about 7–7.25 mm (0.276–0.285 in). They are black, with the elytra chestnut-brown, but occasionally black. The legs are piceous red and occasionally reddish brown. The head and pronotum are as in Dichelus dentipes, but the elytra are narrower though equal in length, distinctly bi-costulate on each side, and they have each three hands of elongate, somewhat hair-like, greyish-white or slightly flavescent scales, often partly obliterated.

== Subspecies ==
- Dichelus villosus villosus (Western Cape, Northern Cape, Limpopo)
- Dichelus villosus luteopygus Schein, 1958 (Western Cape, Northern Cape)
