= Dichelus praestabilis =

Scientific classification
- Kingdom: Animalia
- Phylum: Arthropoda
- Class: Insecta
- Order: Coleoptera
- Suborder: Polyphaga
- Infraorder: Scarabaeiformia
- Family: Scarabaeidae
- Genus: Dichelus
- Species: D. praestabilis

Binomial name
- Dichelus praestabilis (Péringuey, 1902)

Synonyms
- Heterochelus praestabilis Péringuey, 1902

Species of beetle

Dichelus praestabilis is a species of beetle of the family Scarabaeidae. It is found in South Africa (Eastern Cape).

== Description ==
Adults reach a length of about 4.5–5 mm (0.18–0.20 in). Males are very similar to Dichelus sulcatus. The shape is similar and also that of the anterior and posterior tibiae. The elytra also each have a juxta-sutural band of yellow or yellowish scales beginning at a long distance from the base and rounding the apex, and another dorsal one reaching from the base to the median part of the disk, and the scutellum is also clothed with somewhat large, round scales, but the pronotum is very finely and very closely scabroso-punctate, and the median sulcus is less deep, especially in the anterior part. Females are black, with the elytra testaceous, but slightly infuscate at the base. The punctures on the pronotum are not so closely set as in males, especially along the median groove, and on the elytra the two discoidal bands of scales are longer, and there is also an outer marginal one round reaching from the apex to humeral part.
