= Tapeina dispar =

Scientific classification
- Domain: Eukaryota
- Kingdom: Animalia
- Phylum: Arthropoda
- Class: Insecta
- Order: Coleoptera
- Suborder: Polyphaga
- Infraorder: Cucujiformia
- Family: Cerambycidae
- Genus: Tapeina
- Species: T. dispar

Binomial name
- Tapeina dispar Lepeletier & Audinet-Serville, 1828

Species of beetle

Tapeina dispar is a species of beetle in the family Cerambycidae. It was described by Amédée Louis Michel Lepeletier and Jean Guillaume Audinet-Serville in 1828. It is known from Brazil, Argentina and Paraguay.
