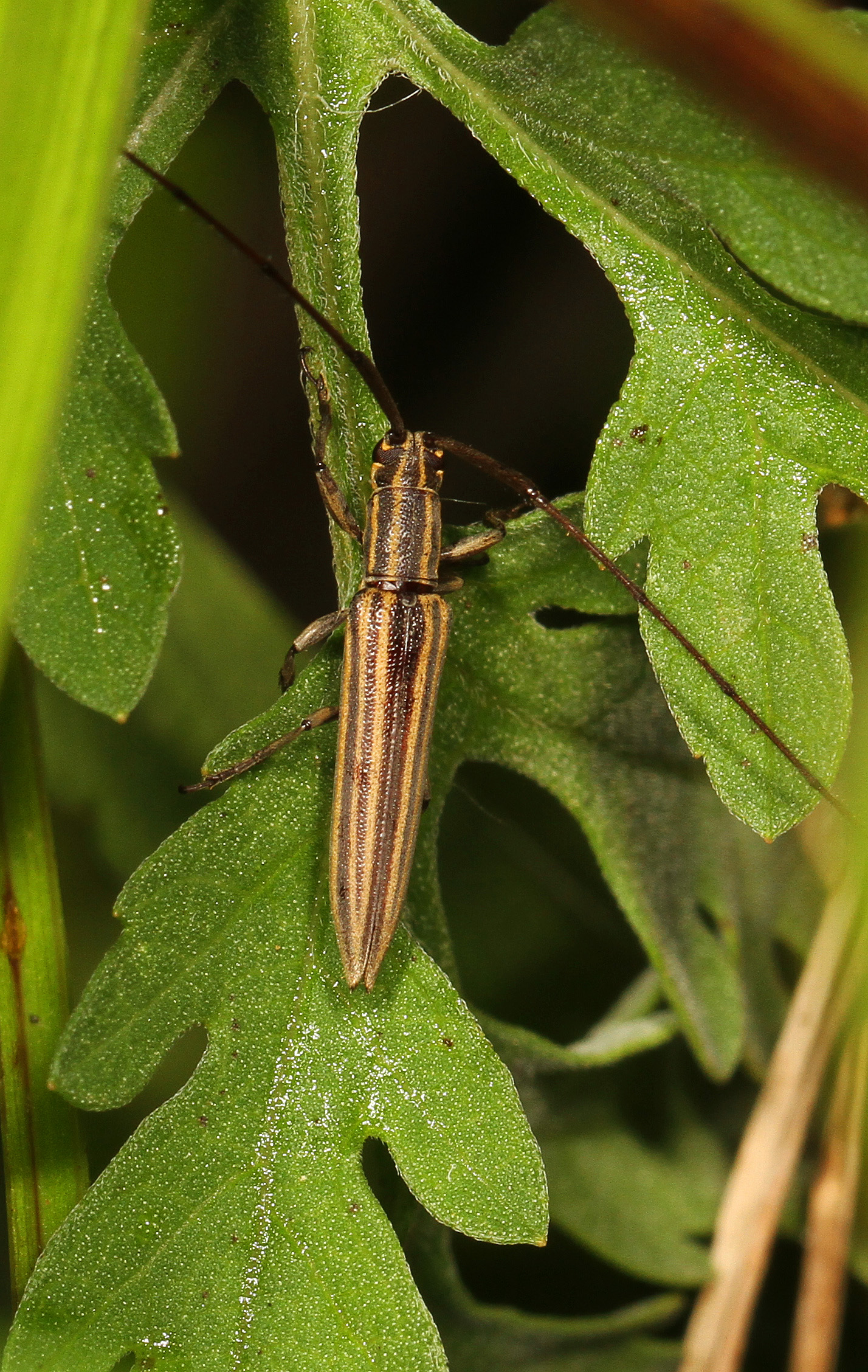
- Hippopsis lemniscata

Scientific classification
- Kingdom: Animalia
- Phylum: Arthropoda
- Class: Insecta
- Order: Coleoptera
- Suborder: Polyphaga
- Infraorder: Cucujiformia
- Family: Cerambycidae
- Subfamily: Lamiinae
- Tribe: Agapanthiini
- Genus: Hippopsis; Lepeletier & Audinet-Serville, 1825

= Hippopsis =

Genus of beetles

Hippopsis is a genus of beetles in the family Cerambycidae, containing the following species:

- Hippopsis albicans Breuning, 1940
- Hippopsis apicalis (Bates, 1866)
- Hippopsis araujoi Martins & Galileo, 2006
- Hippopsis arriagadai Martins & Galileo, 2003
- Hippopsis assimilis Breuning, 1940
- Hippopsis bivittata Martins & Galileo, 2003
- Hippopsis brevicollis Martins & Galileo, 2003
- Hippopsis brevithorax Galileo & Martins, 2007
- Hippopsis campaneri Martins & Galileo, 1998
- Hippopsis densepunctata Breuning, 1940
- Hippopsis femoralis Breuning, 1940
- Hippopsis fractilinea Bates, 1866
- Hippopsis fratercula Galileo & Martins, 1988
- Hippopsis freyi Breuning, 1955
- Hippopsis gilmouri Breuning, 1962
- Hippopsis griseola Bates, 1866
- Hippopsis insularis Breuning, 1962
- Hippopsis iuasanga Martins & Galileo, 2006
- Hippopsis lemniscata (Fabricius, 1801)
- Hippopsis lineolatus Lepeletier & Audinet-Serville, 1825
- Hippopsis macrophthalma Breuning, 1940
- Hippopsis meinerti Aurivillius, 1900
- Hippopsis minima Galileo & Martins, 1988
- Hippopsis monachica Berg, 1889
- Hippopsis mourai Martins & Galileo, 1994
- Hippopsis nigroapicalis Martins & Galileo, 2003
- Hippopsis ocularis Galileo & Martins, 1995
- Hippopsis pallida Carvalho, 1981
- Hippopsis pertusa Galileo & Martins, 1988
- Hippopsis pradieri Guérin-Méneville, 1844
- Hippopsis prona Bates, 1866
- Hippopsis pubiventris Galileo & Martins, 1988
- Hippopsis quadrivittata Breuning, 1940
- Hippopsis quinquelineata Aurivillius, 1920
- Hippopsis rabida Galileo & Martins, 1988
- Hippopsis renodis Galileo & Martins, 1988
- Hippopsis septemlineata Breuning, 1940
- Hippopsis septemvittata Breuning, 1940
- Hippopsis tibialis Martins & Galileo, 2003
- Hippopsis truncatella Bates, 1866
- Hippopsis tuberculata Galileo & Martins, 1988
