= Dichelus pseudovittatus =

Scientific classification
- Kingdom: Animalia
- Phylum: Arthropoda
- Class: Insecta
- Order: Coleoptera
- Suborder: Polyphaga
- Infraorder: Scarabaeiformia
- Family: Scarabaeidae
- Genus: Dichelus
- Species: D. pseudovittatus

Binomial name
- Dichelus pseudovittatus Schein, 1958

Species of beetle

Dichelus pseudovittatus is a species of beetle of the family Scarabaeidae. It is found in South Africa (Western Cape).

== Description ==
Adults reach a length of about 5–5.5 mm (0.20–0.22 in). They are black and similar to Dichelus vittatus. The pronotum has deep black hairs, and has orange-yellow scales at the rear edge. There are three orange-yellow bands of scales on each of the dark elytra, and the spaces between these bands have scales which have the same colour as the ground colour.
