= Dichelus emeritus =

Scientific classification
- Kingdom: Animalia
- Phylum: Arthropoda
- Class: Insecta
- Order: Coleoptera
- Suborder: Polyphaga
- Infraorder: Scarabaeiformia
- Family: Scarabaeidae
- Genus: Dichelus
- Species: D. emeritus

Binomial name
- Dichelus emeritus (Péringuey, 1902)

Synonyms
- Heterochelus emeritus Péringuey, 1902

Species of beetle

Dichelus emeritus is a species of beetle of the family Scarabaeidae. It is found in South Africa (Western Cape).

== Description ==
Adults reach a length of about 5.25–6 mm (0.207–0.236 in). Males are black and shining, the elytra with a basal light testaceous patch in the shape of a truncate cone reaching from each humeral angle to about the median part. The legs reddish. The head is rugose and not very briefly pubescent. The pronotum has the same sculpture as Dichelus bipartitus, but is more densely pubescent, the pubescence being black and erect, there is no trace of scale or squamose hairs. The scutellum is partly clothed with whitish squamose appressed hairs. The elytra are punctured but very shining, and have a sutural band of yellow, elongate-ovate scales beginning at about the median part, rounding the apex and ascending the outer margin for about one-fourth of the length. The propygidium, and pygidium, but not the abdomen, are clothed with deep yellow scales. Females are similar to males, but the sutural and marginal bands of scales are more like appressed hairs.
