= Allodynerus koenigi =

Scientific classification
- Kingdom: Animalia
- Phylum: Arthropoda
- Clade: Pancrustacea
- Class: Insecta
- Order: Hymenoptera
- Family: Vespidae
- Genus: Allodynerus
- Species: A. koenigi

Binomial name
- Allodynerus koenigi (Dusmet, 1917)

Species of wasp

Allodynerus koenigi is a species of wasp in the family Vespidae.
