= Tapeina rudifrons =

Scientific classification
- Domain: Eukaryota
- Kingdom: Animalia
- Phylum: Arthropoda
- Class: Insecta
- Order: Coleoptera
- Suborder: Polyphaga
- Infraorder: Cucujiformia
- Family: Cerambycidae
- Genus: Tapeina
- Species: T. rudifrons

Binomial name
- Tapeina rudifrons Marinoni, 1972

Species of beetle

Tapeina rudifrons is a species of beetle in the family Cerambycidae. It was described by Marinoni in 1972. It is known from Argentina, Brazil and Paraguay.
