= Dichelus puerilis =

Scientific classification
- Kingdom: Animalia
- Phylum: Arthropoda
- Class: Insecta
- Order: Coleoptera
- Suborder: Polyphaga
- Infraorder: Scarabaeiformia
- Family: Scarabaeidae
- Genus: Dichelus
- Species: D. puerilis

Binomial name
- Dichelus puerilis (Péringuey, 1902)

Synonyms
- Heterochelus puerilis Péringuey, 1902

Species of beetle

Dichelus puerilis is a species of beetle of the family Scarabaeidae. It is found in South Africa (Eastern Cape).

== Description ==
Adults reach a length of about 4 mm (0.16 in). Males are black, with the elytra light testaceous, and the legs red. The elytra are covered with small, seriate, not closely set, very short appressed hairs, and only in the apical margin is there a narrow band of scales, but the scutellum, the pygidial part, and the abdomen are densely scaly. The pronotum is closely scabroso-punctate, clothed with a dense but short, erect greyish pubescence, and with a somewhat broad but very shallow longitudinal groove in the posterior part. Females are similar to males, but the scales on the pygidial part and abdomen are whiter.
