= Hippopsis pallida =

Scientific classification
- Kingdom: Animalia
- Phylum: Arthropoda
- Class: Insecta
- Order: Coleoptera
- Suborder: Polyphaga
- Infraorder: Cucujiformia
- Family: Cerambycidae
- Genus: Hippopsis
- Species: H. pallida

Binomial name
- Hippopsis pallida Carvalho, 1981

Species of beetle

Hippopsis pallida is a species of beetle in the family Cerambycidae. It was described by Carvalho in 1981.
