= Allodynerus fallax =

Scientific classification
- Kingdom: Animalia
- Phylum: Arthropoda
- Clade: Pancrustacea
- Class: Insecta
- Order: Hymenoptera
- Family: Vespidae
- Genus: Allodynerus
- Species: A. fallax

Binomial name
- Allodynerus fallax Blüthgen, 1953

Species of wasp

Allodynerus fallax is a species of wasp in the family Vespidae.
