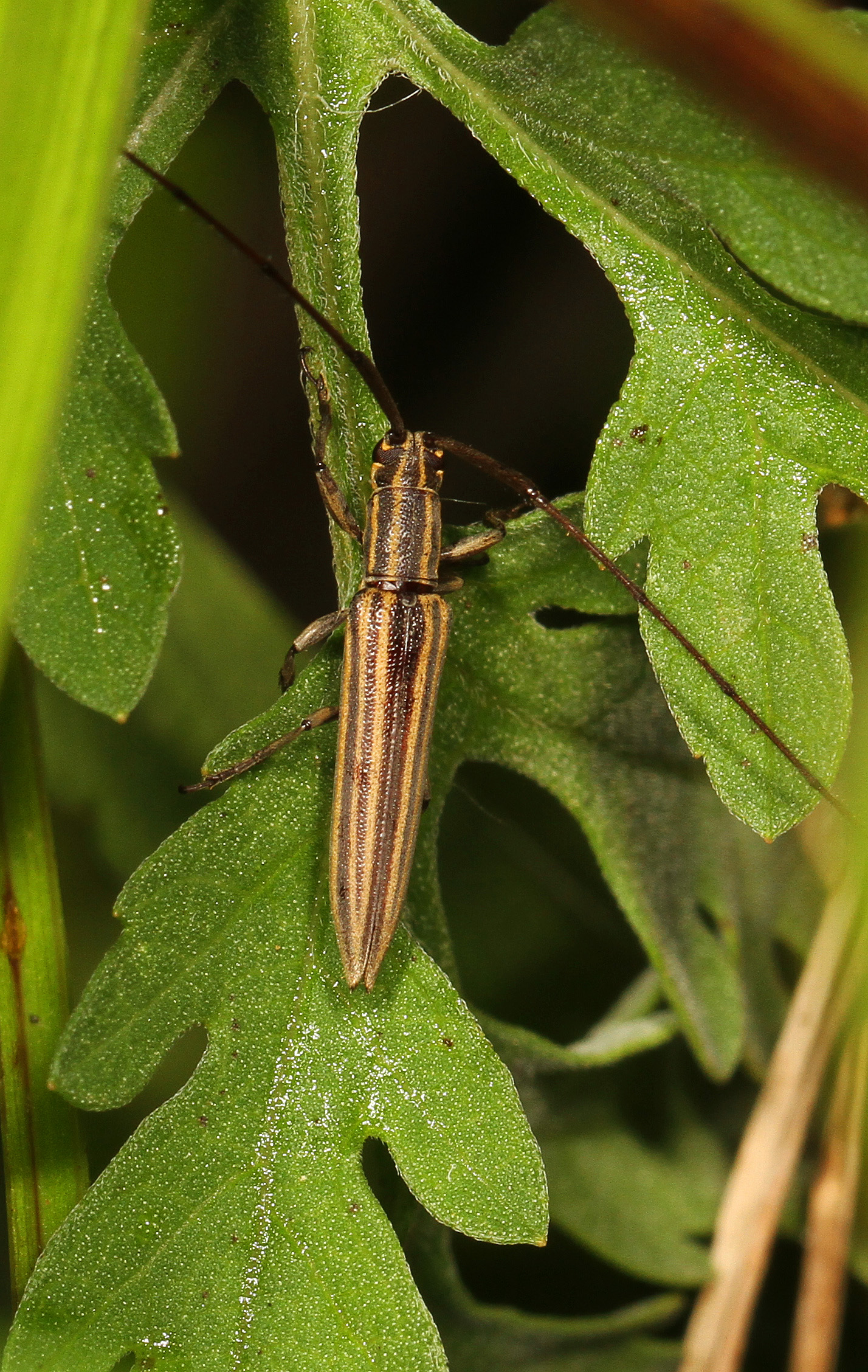

Scientific classification
- Kingdom: Animalia
- Phylum: Arthropoda
- Class: Insecta
- Order: Coleoptera
- Suborder: Polyphaga
- Infraorder: Cucujiformia
- Family: Cerambycidae
- Genus: Hippopsis
- Species: H. lemniscata

Binomial name
- Hippopsis lemniscata (Fabricius, 1801)

= Hippopsis lemniscata =

Species of beetle

Hippopsis lemniscata is a species of beetle in the family Cerambycidae. It was described by Johan Christian Fabricius in 1801.
