= Dichelus platynotus =

Scientific classification
- Kingdom: Animalia
- Phylum: Arthropoda
- Class: Insecta
- Order: Coleoptera
- Suborder: Polyphaga
- Infraorder: Scarabaeiformia
- Family: Scarabaeidae
- Genus: Dichelus
- Species: D. platynotus

Binomial name
- Dichelus platynotus (Burmeister, 1844)

Synonyms
- Heterochelus platynotus Burmeister, 1844

Species of beetle

Dichelus platynotus is a species of beetle of the family Scarabaeidae. It is found in South Africa (Western Cape).

== Description ==
Adults reach a length of about 6 mm (0.24 in). They are black, opaque and pilose. The antennae, elytra and legs are rufous and the pygidium of the males has flavous scales.
