= Scobina inculta =

Scientific classification
- Domain: Eukaryota
- Kingdom: Animalia
- Phylum: Arthropoda
- Class: Insecta
- Order: Hymenoptera
- Suborder: Symphyta
- Family: Argidae
- Genus: Scobina
- Species: S. inculta

Binomial name
- Scobina inculta Konow, 1906

Species of insect

Scobina inculta is a species of sawfly belonging to the family Argidae that is found in South America.
