= Dichelus pseudoluctuosus =

Scientific classification
- Kingdom: Animalia
- Phylum: Arthropoda
- Class: Insecta
- Order: Coleoptera
- Suborder: Polyphaga
- Infraorder: Scarabaeiformia
- Family: Scarabaeidae
- Genus: Dichelus
- Species: D. pseudoluctuosus

Binomial name
- Dichelus pseudoluctuosus Schein, 1958

Species of beetle

Dichelus pseudoluctuosus is a species of beetle of the family Scarabaeidae. It is found in South Africa (Western Cape, Eastern Cape).

== Description ==
Adults reach a length of about 6 mm (0.24 in). They are black without scales on the elytra and pygidium.
