= Dichelus parvulus =

Scientific classification
- Kingdom: Animalia
- Phylum: Arthropoda
- Class: Insecta
- Order: Coleoptera
- Suborder: Polyphaga
- Infraorder: Scarabaeiformia
- Family: Scarabaeidae
- Genus: Dichelus
- Species: D. parvulus

Binomial name
- Dichelus parvulus (Burmeister, 1844)

Synonyms
- Ischnochelus parvulus Burmeister, 1844

Species of beetle

Dichelus parvulus is a species of beetle of the family Scarabaeidae. It is found in South Africa (Cape).

== Description ==
Adults reach a length of about 3–3.5 mm (0.12–0.14 in). The legs and elytra are reddish-brown and the pronotum is almost glabrous, strongly punctate and with setae on the sides. The elytra are evenly covered with small yellowish-brown scales. Both the propygidium and pygidium are almost glabrous.
