= Dichelus flavimanus =

Scientific classification
- Kingdom: Animalia
- Phylum: Arthropoda
- Class: Insecta
- Order: Coleoptera
- Suborder: Polyphaga
- Infraorder: Scarabaeiformia
- Family: Scarabaeidae
- Genus: Dichelus
- Species: D. flavimanus

Binomial name
- Dichelus flavimanus (Burmeister, 1855)

Synonyms
- Heterochelus flavimanus Burmeister, 1855

Species of beetle

Dichelus flavimanus is a species of beetle of the family Scarabaeidae. It is found in South Africa (Cape).

== Description ==
Adults reach a length of about 5 mm (0.20 in). They are black, silky and opaque, with the antennae and anterior legs testaceous. The pronotum has a finely raised outer margin with stiff setae. The elytra are indistinctly striate, and have some punctures with short black greenish hairs. The pygidium is not shiny and black. The ventral surface of the abdomen is dull shiny, clothed at the sides with scattered white scales. The legs are long, thin, shiny and black-brown, although the anterior ones are light reddish yellow.
