= Hippopsis quinquelineata =

Scientific classification
- Kingdom: Animalia
- Phylum: Arthropoda
- Class: Insecta
- Order: Coleoptera
- Suborder: Polyphaga
- Infraorder: Cucujiformia
- Family: Cerambycidae
- Genus: Hippopsis
- Species: H. quinquelineata

Binomial name
- Hippopsis quinquelineata Aurivillius, 1920

Species of beetle

Hippopsis quinquelineata is a species of beetle in the family Cerambycidae. It was described by Per Olof Christopher Aurivillius in 1920.
