= Hippopsis monachica =

Scientific classification
- Kingdom: Animalia
- Phylum: Arthropoda
- Class: Insecta
- Order: Coleoptera
- Suborder: Polyphaga
- Infraorder: Cucujiformia
- Family: Cerambycidae
- Genus: Hippopsis
- Species: H. monachica

Binomial name
- Hippopsis monachica Berg, 1889

Species of beetle

Hippopsis monachica is a species of beetle in the family Cerambycidae. It was described by Berg in 1889.
