= Dichelus albolineatus =

Scientific classification
- Kingdom: Animalia
- Phylum: Arthropoda
- Class: Insecta
- Order: Coleoptera
- Suborder: Polyphaga
- Infraorder: Scarabaeiformia
- Family: Scarabaeidae
- Genus: Dichelus
- Species: D. albolineatus

Binomial name
- Dichelus albolineatus Schein, 1958

Species of beetle

Dichelus albolineatus is a species of beetle of the family Scarabaeidae. It is found in South Africa (Western Cape).

== Description ==
Adults reach a length of about 5 mm (0.20 in). They are black and the elytra each have a white band of scales at the suture and in the middle of the disc. The scutellum and the margin of the propygidium are covered with white scales and the thorax is covered with long, erect hairs. The legs are black. The head and pronotum are covered with long dark hairs.
