= Dichelus nitidissimus =

Scientific classification
- Kingdom: Animalia
- Phylum: Arthropoda
- Class: Insecta
- Order: Coleoptera
- Suborder: Polyphaga
- Infraorder: Scarabaeiformia
- Family: Scarabaeidae
- Genus: Dichelus
- Species: D. nitidissimus

Binomial name
- Dichelus nitidissimus (Burmeister, 1844)

Synonyms
- Heterochelus nitidissimus Burmeister, 1844

Species of beetle

Dichelus nitidissimus is a species of beetle of the family Scarabaeidae. It is found in South Africa (Cape).

== Description ==
Adults reach a length of about 6.25 mm (0.246 in). The head, anterior part of the pronotum and body are black. The anterior part of the pronotum is shining, somewhat thickly punctulate as on the vertex of the head, and each puncture bears a hair, all of them being somewhat scattered. In the posterior part is a furrow set with yellow scales which are also spread on the posterior part. Similar scales are found on the scutellum and pygidium, the latter also with two black patches. The elytra are very shiny and have some short, bristly hairs only on the sides and at the apex, they are entirely red, as are the legs and the antennae.
