= Tapeina melzeri =

Scientific classification
- Domain: Eukaryota
- Kingdom: Animalia
- Phylum: Arthropoda
- Class: Insecta
- Order: Coleoptera
- Suborder: Polyphaga
- Infraorder: Cucujiformia
- Family: Cerambycidae
- Genus: Tapeina
- Species: T. melzeri

Binomial name
- Tapeina melzeri Zajciw, 1966

Species of beetle

Tapeina melzeri is a species of beetle in the family Cerambycidae. It was described by Zajciw in 1966. It is known from Argentina, Brazil and Paraguay.
