= Scobina bolivari =

Scientific classification
- Domain: Eukaryota
- Kingdom: Animalia
- Phylum: Arthropoda
- Class: Insecta
- Order: Hymenoptera
- Suborder: Symphyta
- Family: Argidae
- Genus: Scobina
- Species: S. bolivari

Binomial name
- Scobina bolivari Konow, 1899

Species of insect

Scobina bolivari is a species of sawfly belonging to the Argidae family that is present in Colombia, Ecuador, Peru, Bolivia and northern Argentina.
