= Euryptera leonina =

Scientific classification
- Kingdom: Animalia
- Phylum: Arthropoda
- Class: Insecta
- Order: Coleoptera
- Suborder: Polyphaga
- Infraorder: Cucujiformia
- Family: Cerambycidae
- Genus: Euryptera
- Species: E. leonina

Binomial name
- Euryptera leonina Gounelle, 1911

Species of beetle

Euryptera leonina is a species of beetle in the family Cerambycidae. It was described by Gounelle in 1911.
