= Dichelus laticollis =

Scientific classification
- Kingdom: Animalia
- Phylum: Arthropoda
- Class: Insecta
- Order: Coleoptera
- Suborder: Polyphaga
- Infraorder: Scarabaeiformia
- Family: Scarabaeidae
- Genus: Dichelus
- Species: D. laticollis

Binomial name
- Dichelus laticollis (Burmeister, 1844)

Synonyms
- Heterochelus laticollis Burmeister, 1844

Species of beetle

Dichelus laticollis is a species of beetle of the family Scarabaeidae. It is found in South Africa (Western Cape).

== Description ==
Adults reach a length of about 5.25–7 mm (0.207–0.276 in). They are black and opaque, with the antennae (except the club) reddish, the propygidium and pygidium are glabrous, and the abdominal segments have an upper patch of similar scales.
