= Hippopsis ocularis =

Scientific classification
- Kingdom: Animalia
- Phylum: Arthropoda
- Class: Insecta
- Order: Coleoptera
- Suborder: Polyphaga
- Infraorder: Cucujiformia
- Family: Cerambycidae
- Genus: Hippopsis
- Species: H. ocularis

Binomial name
- Hippopsis ocularis Galileo & Martins, 1995

Species of beetle

Hippopsis ocularis is a species of beetle in the family Cerambycidae. It was described by Galileo and Martins in 1995.
