= Chasme kochi =

Scientific classification
- Kingdom: Animalia
- Phylum: Arthropoda
- Class: Insecta
- Order: Coleoptera
- Suborder: Polyphaga
- Infraorder: Scarabaeiformia
- Family: Scarabaeidae
- Genus: Chasme
- Species: C. kochi

Binomial name
- Chasme kochi Schein, 1959

Species of beetle

Chasme kochi is a species of beetle of the family Scarabaeidae. It is found in South Africa (Northern Cape).

== Description ==
Adults reach a length of about 4–4.5 mm (0.16–0.18 in). They are black, the head and pronotum with clay-yellow scales. The elytra are densely covered with clay-yellow scales. The legs are pitch-brown, and often darkened. There are no long black bristly hairs on the elytra.
