= Allodynerus leleji =

Scientific classification
- Kingdom: Animalia
- Phylum: Arthropoda
- Clade: Pancrustacea
- Class: Insecta
- Order: Hymenoptera
- Family: Vespidae
- Genus: Allodynerus
- Species: A. leleji

Binomial name
- Allodynerus leleji Kurzenko, 1995

Species of wasp

Allodynerus leleji is a species of wasp in the family Vespidae.
