= Hippopsis rabida =

Scientific classification
- Kingdom: Animalia
- Phylum: Arthropoda
- Class: Insecta
- Order: Coleoptera
- Suborder: Polyphaga
- Infraorder: Cucujiformia
- Family: Cerambycidae
- Genus: Hippopsis
- Species: H. rabida

Binomial name
- Hippopsis rabida Galileo & Martins, 1988

Species of beetle

Hippopsis rabida is a species of beetle in the family Cerambycidae. It was described by Galileo and Martins in 1988.
