= Dichelus zuluanus =

Scientific classification
- Kingdom: Animalia
- Phylum: Arthropoda
- Class: Insecta
- Order: Coleoptera
- Suborder: Polyphaga
- Infraorder: Scarabaeiformia
- Family: Scarabaeidae
- Genus: Dichelus
- Species: D. zuluanus

Binomial name
- Dichelus zuluanus Péringuey, 1902

Species of beetle

Dichelus zuluanus is a species of beetle of the family Scarabaeidae. It is found in South Africa (KwaZulu-Natal).

== Description ==
Adults reach a length of about 6.75 mm (0.266 in). They are black, with the elytra and legs piceous. The scutellum, propygidium and upper side of the abdomen have sub-flavescent elongate scales. The head and pronotum are punctate and somewhat densely pubescent. The pubescence is flavescent. The elytra are roughly punctured and clothed with an appressed greyish pubescence. The pygidium is clothed with greyish hairs.
