= Allodynerus nudatus =

Scientific classification
- Kingdom: Animalia
- Phylum: Arthropoda
- Clade: Pancrustacea
- Class: Insecta
- Order: Hymenoptera
- Family: Vespidae
- Genus: Allodynerus
- Species: A. nudatus

Binomial name
- Allodynerus nudatus Gusenleitner, 1991

Species of wasp

Allodynerus nudatus is a species of wasp in the family Vespidae.
