= Hippopsis apicalis =

Scientific classification
- Kingdom: Animalia
- Phylum: Arthropoda
- Class: Insecta
- Order: Coleoptera
- Suborder: Polyphaga
- Infraorder: Cucujiformia
- Family: Cerambycidae
- Genus: Hippopsis
- Species: H. apicalis

Binomial name
- Hippopsis apicalis (Bates, 1866)

Species of beetle

Hippopsis apicalis is a species of beetle in the family Cerambycidae. It was described by Henry Walter Bates in 1866.
