= Scobina lepida =

Scientific classification
- Domain: Eukaryota
- Kingdom: Animalia
- Phylum: Arthropoda
- Class: Insecta
- Order: Hymenoptera
- Suborder: Symphyta
- Family: Argidae
- Genus: Scobina
- Species: S. lepida

Binomial name
- Scobina lepida F. Klug, 1834

Species of insect

Scobina lepida is a species of sawfly belonging to the family Argidae that is present in Costa Rica, El Salvador, Guatemala, Honduras, Mexico, Nicaragua and Panama. Within Mexico, it is found in Chiapas, Oaxaca and, Veracruz.
