= Dichelus sulcatus =

Scientific classification
- Kingdom: Animalia
- Phylum: Arthropoda
- Class: Insecta
- Order: Coleoptera
- Suborder: Polyphaga
- Infraorder: Scarabaeiformia
- Family: Scarabaeidae
- Genus: Dichelus
- Species: D. sulcatus

Binomial name
- Dichelus sulcatus (Burmeister, 1844)

Synonyms
- Ischnochelus sulcatus Burmeister, 1844

Species of beetle

Dichelus sulcatus is a species of beetle of the family Scarabaeidae. It is found in South Africa (Northern Cape).

== Description ==
Adults reach a length of about 4.5–5 mm (0.18–0.20 in). They are similar to Dichelus minutus. The colour and sculpture are identical, but the general facies is a little more elongate, and instead of squamose appressed hairs the intervals on the elytra are filled with round bright yellow scales which also form a narrow band on the apical margin. The apical part of the propygidium and the pygidium are clothed with nearly contiguous, round, thick, yellow scales, while only the edges of the abdominal segments are scaly, and the scales are white.
