= Dichelus collaris =

Scientific classification
- Kingdom: Animalia
- Phylum: Arthropoda
- Class: Insecta
- Order: Coleoptera
- Suborder: Polyphaga
- Infraorder: Scarabaeiformia
- Family: Scarabaeidae
- Genus: Dichelus
- Species: D. collaris

Binomial name
- Dichelus collaris Kulzer, 1960

Species of beetle

Dichelus collaris is a species of beetle of the family Scarabaeidae. It is found in South Africa (Northern Cape).

== Description ==
Adults reach a length of about 4.5–5 mm (0.18–0.20 in). They have an elongate, cylindrical body. The head, pronotum and underside are black, while the legs and elytra are reddish-brown, the latter almost glabrous, with only a few white hairs and yellow scales at the tips.
