= Allodynerus laticlypeus =

Scientific classification
- Kingdom: Animalia
- Phylum: Arthropoda
- Clade: Pancrustacea
- Class: Insecta
- Order: Hymenoptera
- Family: Vespidae
- Genus: Allodynerus
- Species: A. laticlypeus

Binomial name
- Allodynerus laticlypeus Giordani Soika,1972

Species of wasp

Allodynerus laticlypeus is a species of wasp in the family Vespidae.
