= Dichelus tibialis =

Scientific classification
- Kingdom: Animalia
- Phylum: Arthropoda
- Class: Insecta
- Order: Coleoptera
- Suborder: Polyphaga
- Infraorder: Scarabaeiformia
- Family: Scarabaeidae
- Genus: Dichelus
- Species: D. tibialis

Binomial name
- Dichelus tibialis Kulzer, 1960

Species of beetle

Dichelus tibialis is a species of beetle of the family Scarabaeidae. It is found in South Africa (Western Cape).

== Description ==
Adults reach a length of about 5–6 mm (0.20–0.24 in). They have a black, elongate body, with reddish-brown legs. The elytra are densely covered with dark scales, and each elytron has three sharply defined, pale yellow scale bands. The dark scales are short-oval, while the pale scales are circular.
