= Dichelus pallidipennis =

Scientific classification
- Kingdom: Animalia
- Phylum: Arthropoda
- Class: Insecta
- Order: Coleoptera
- Suborder: Polyphaga
- Infraorder: Scarabaeiformia
- Family: Scarabaeidae
- Genus: Dichelus
- Species: D. pallidipennis

Binomial name
- Dichelus pallidipennis (Blanchard, 1850)

Synonyms
- Heterochelus pallidipennis Blanchard, 1850

Species of beetle

Dichelus pallidipennis is a species of beetle of the family Scarabaeidae. It is found in South Africa (Western Cape).

== Description ==
Adults reach a length of about 5 mm (0.20 in). Males are black, with the elytra flavous. The pygidium is hairy, with two hairless patches at the base. The head and pronotum are densely covered with greyish hairs and the elytra have a few appressed hairs. Females are like the males, but the pygidium is covered with greyish white appressed hairs and has no hairless space.
