= Allodynerus nigricornis =

Scientific classification
- Kingdom: Animalia
- Phylum: Arthropoda
- Clade: Pancrustacea
- Class: Insecta
- Order: Hymenoptera
- Family: Vespidae
- Genus: Allodynerus
- Species: A. nigricornis

Binomial name
- Allodynerus nigricornis (Morawitz, 1885)

Species of wasp

Allodynerus nigricornis is a species of wasp in the family Vespidae.
