= Hippopsis meinerti =

Scientific classification
- Kingdom: Animalia
- Phylum: Arthropoda
- Class: Insecta
- Order: Coleoptera
- Suborder: Polyphaga
- Infraorder: Cucujiformia
- Family: Cerambycidae
- Genus: Hippopsis
- Species: H. meinerti

Binomial name
- Hippopsis meinerti Aurivillius, 1900

Species of beetle

Hippopsis meinerti is a species of beetle in the family Cerambycidae. It was described by Per Olof Christopher Aurivillius in 1900.
