= Euryptera nigrosuturalis =

Scientific classification
- Kingdom: Animalia
- Phylum: Arthropoda
- Class: Insecta
- Order: Coleoptera
- Suborder: Polyphaga
- Infraorder: Cucujiformia
- Family: Cerambycidae
- Genus: Euryptera
- Species: E. nigrosuturalis

Binomial name
- Euryptera nigrosuturalis Melzer, 1935

Species of beetle

Euryptera nigrosuturalis is a species of beetle in the family Cerambycidae. It was described by Melzer in 1935.
