= Euryptera unilineatocollis =

Scientific classification
- Kingdom: Animalia
- Phylum: Arthropoda
- Clade: Pancrustacea
- Class: Insecta
- Order: Coleoptera
- Suborder: Polyphaga
- Infraorder: Cucujiformia
- Family: Cerambycidae
- Genus: Euryptera
- Species: E. unilineatocollis

Binomial name
- Euryptera unilineatocollis E. Fuchs, 1956

Species of beetle

Euryptera unilineatocollis is a species of beetle in the family Cerambycidae. It was described by Ernst Fuchs in 1956. It is found in Brazil (Minas Gerais, Espírito Santo, Rio de Janeiro, São Paulo, Paraná, Santa Catarina), Paraguay and Argentina (Misiones).
