= Dichelus expansus =

Scientific classification
- Kingdom: Animalia
- Phylum: Arthropoda
- Class: Insecta
- Order: Coleoptera
- Suborder: Polyphaga
- Infraorder: Scarabaeiformia
- Family: Scarabaeidae
- Genus: Dichelus
- Species: D. expansus

Binomial name
- Dichelus expansus Péringuey, 1902

Species of beetle

Dichelus expansus is a species of beetle of the family Scarabaeidae. It is found in South Africa (Western Cape).

== Description ==
Adults reach a length of about 6–7 mm (0.24–0.28 in). Males resemble Dichelus dentipes in general build and also in the shape of the hind legs, but it is differentiated by the colour of the body which is black, but has a greenish, metallic tinge, the elytra are redder and opaque, but clothed with the same greyish pubescence, and the legs are of the same colour as the elytra. Females are also like females of D. dentipes, but have two distinct hairless patches on each side of the pygidium.
