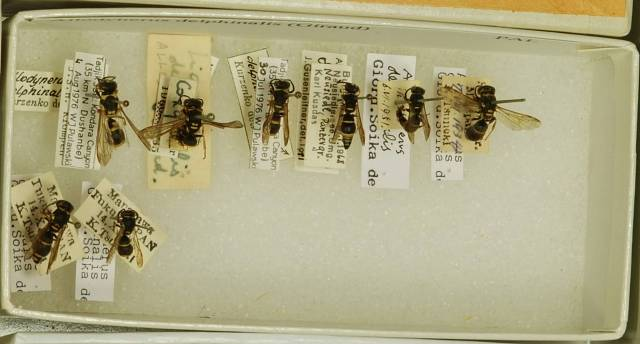
- Allodynerus delphinalis

Scientific classification
- Kingdom: Animalia
- Phylum: Arthropoda
- Clade: Pancrustacea
- Class: Insecta
- Order: Hymenoptera
- Family: Vespidae
- Genus: Allodynerus
- Species: A. delphinalis

Binomial name
- Allodynerus delphinalis (Giraud, 1866)

= Allodynerus delphinalis =

Species of wasp

Allodynerus delphinalis is a species of wasp in the family Vespidae.
