= Dichelus duplosquamosus =

Scientific classification
- Kingdom: Animalia
- Phylum: Arthropoda
- Class: Insecta
- Order: Coleoptera
- Suborder: Polyphaga
- Infraorder: Scarabaeiformia
- Family: Scarabaeidae
- Genus: Dichelus
- Species: D. duplosquamosus

Binomial name
- Dichelus duplosquamosus Schein, 1958

Species of beetle

Dichelus duplosquamosus is a species of beetle of the family Scarabaeidae. It is found in South Africa (Western Cape).

== Description ==
Adults reach a length of about 5–6 mm (0.20–0.24 in). They are black and similar to Dichelus vittatus. There are three longitudinal bands of very densely packed, small, round, white-yellow scales and two ribs in between, which are covered with white-yellow, upright, less densely packed scales.
