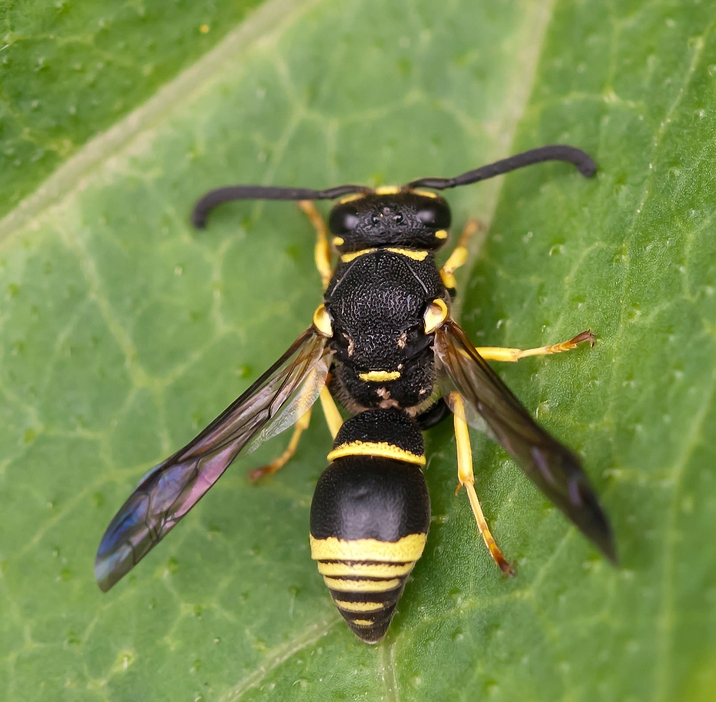
- Allodynerus delphinalis

Scientific classification
- Domain: Eukaryota
- Kingdom: Animalia
- Phylum: Arthropoda
- Class: Insecta
- Order: Hymenoptera
- Family: Vespidae
- Subfamily: Eumeninae
- Genus: Allodynerus; Bluethgen, 1938

Species
- Allodynerus africanus; Allodynerus delphinalis; Allodynerus dignotus; Allodynerus fallax; Allodynerus floricola; Allodynerus koenigi; Allodynerus laticlypeus; Allodynerus leleji; Allodynerus mandschuricus; Allodynerus mateui; Allodynerus nigricornis; Allodynerus nudatus; Allodynerus rossii; Allodynerus vinciguerrae

= Allodynerus =

Genus of wasps

Allodynerus is a genus of potter wasps. It is found in the Palearctic and the Afrotropics.
