= Dichelus fulvipennis =

Scientific classification
- Kingdom: Animalia
- Phylum: Arthropoda
- Class: Insecta
- Order: Coleoptera
- Suborder: Polyphaga
- Infraorder: Scarabaeiformia
- Family: Scarabaeidae
- Genus: Dichelus
- Species: D. fulvipennis

Binomial name
- Dichelus fulvipennis Kulzer, 1960

Species of beetle

Dichelus fulvipennis is a species of beetle of the family Scarabaeidae. It is found in South Africa (Northern Cape).

== Description ==
Adults reach a length of about 5–6 mm (0.20–0.24 in). They have an elongate, cylindrical body. The head, pronotum and part of the underside are black, while the legs are reddish-brown. The elytra are light brown, but black at the rear and at the sides. A deep sutural stria and the apex are densely covered with yellow scales, while the rest is covered with fine, yellow hairs.
