= Tapeina transversifrons =

Scientific classification
- Domain: Eukaryota
- Kingdom: Animalia
- Phylum: Arthropoda
- Class: Insecta
- Order: Coleoptera
- Suborder: Polyphaga
- Infraorder: Cucujiformia
- Family: Cerambycidae
- Genus: Tapeina
- Species: T. transversifrons

Binomial name
- Tapeina transversifrons Thomson, 1857

Synonyms
- Tapina transversifrons (Thomson) Gemminger & Harold, 1873; Tapeina costaricensis Breuning, 1974

Species of beetle

Tapeina transversifrons is a species of beetle in the family Cerambycidae. It was described by James Thomson in 1857. It is known from Honduras, Costa Rica, Nicaragua, Guatemala, Mexico, Belize, Panama, El Salvador, and Venezuela.

== Subspecies ==
- Tapeina transversifrons transversifrons Thomson, 1857
- Tapeina transversifrons brevifrons Chemsak & Linsley in Marinoni, 1972
- Tapeina transversifrons centralis Marinoni, 1972
