= Hippopsis pubiventris =

Scientific classification
- Kingdom: Animalia
- Phylum: Arthropoda
- Clade: Pancrustacea
- Class: Insecta
- Order: Coleoptera
- Suborder: Polyphaga
- Infraorder: Cucujiformia
- Family: Cerambycidae
- Genus: Hippopsis
- Species: H. pubiventris

Binomial name
- Hippopsis pubiventris Galileo & Martins, 1988

Species of beetle

Hippopsis pubiventris is a species of beetle in the family Cerambycidae. It was described by Galileo and Martins in 1988. It is found in Brazil (Acre, Maranhão, Ceará, Minas Gerais, Rio de Janeiro, Santa Catarina), Peru and Bolivia (Santa Cruz).
