= Dichelus minimus =

Scientific classification
- Kingdom: Animalia
- Phylum: Arthropoda
- Class: Insecta
- Order: Coleoptera
- Suborder: Polyphaga
- Infraorder: Scarabaeiformia
- Family: Scarabaeidae
- Genus: Dichelus
- Species: D. minimus

Binomial name
- Dichelus minimus Kulzer, 1960

Species of beetle

Dichelus minimus is a species of beetle of the family Scarabaeidae. It is found in South Africa (Northern Cape).

== Description ==
Adults reach a length of about 3–3.5 mm (0.12–0.14 in). The head, pronotum and underside are black, while the legs are reddish-brown. The elytra are light brown, with white, elongated scales that become denser and somewhat wider at the suture and at the end.
