= Tapeina hylaeana =

Scientific classification
- Domain: Eukaryota
- Kingdom: Animalia
- Phylum: Arthropoda
- Class: Insecta
- Order: Coleoptera
- Suborder: Polyphaga
- Infraorder: Cucujiformia
- Family: Cerambycidae
- Genus: Tapeina
- Species: T. hylaeana

Binomial name
- Tapeina hylaeana Marinoni, 1972

Species of beetle

Tapeina hylaeana is a species of beetle in the family Cerambycidae. It was described by Marinoni in 1972. It is known from Brazil.
