= Tapeina erectifrons =

Scientific classification
- Domain: Eukaryota
- Kingdom: Animalia
- Phylum: Arthropoda
- Class: Insecta
- Order: Coleoptera
- Suborder: Polyphaga
- Infraorder: Cucujiformia
- Family: Cerambycidae
- Genus: Tapeina
- Species: T. erectifrons

Binomial name
- Tapeina erectifrons Thomson, 1857

Species of beetle

Tapeina erectifrons is a species of beetle in the family Cerambycidae. It was described by James Thomson in 1857. It is known from Peru, French Guiana, Colombia, Brazil, and Venezuela.

== Subspecies ==
- Tapeina erectifrons erectifrons Thomson, 1857
- Tapeina erectifrons avuncula Marinoni, 1972
- Tapeina erectifrons amazona Marinoni, 1972
