= Dichelus pauperatus =

Scientific classification
- Kingdom: Animalia
- Phylum: Arthropoda
- Class: Insecta
- Order: Coleoptera
- Suborder: Polyphaga
- Infraorder: Scarabaeiformia
- Family: Scarabaeidae
- Genus: Dichelus
- Species: D. pauperatus

Binomial name
- Dichelus pauperatus (Burmeister, 1844)

Synonyms
- Ischnochelus pauperatus Burmeister, 1844

Species of beetle

Dichelus pauperatus is a species of beetle of the family Scarabaeidae. It is found in South Africa (Cape).

== Description ==
Adults reach a length of about 3–3.5 mm (0.12–0.14 in). The elytra are clay-yellow, with greyish-yellow appressed hairs, while the pronotum has greyish-yellow erect hairs. The pygidium and abdomen have yellow hairs, while the propygidium only has a fine margin of yellow scales. The legs are reddish-brown.
