= Dichelus andreaei =

Scientific classification
- Kingdom: Animalia
- Phylum: Arthropoda
- Class: Insecta
- Order: Coleoptera
- Suborder: Polyphaga
- Infraorder: Scarabaeiformia
- Family: Scarabaeidae
- Genus: Dichelus
- Species: D. andreaei

Binomial name
- Dichelus andreaei Kulzer, 1960

Species of beetle

Dichelus andreaei is a species of beetle of the family Scarabaeidae. It is found in South Africa (Western Cape).

== Description ==
Adults reach a length of about 5 mm (0.20 in). They are black, except for the legs, which are reddish-brown. The elytra are evenly and densely covered with yellow scales.
