= Hippopsis griseola =

Scientific classification
- Kingdom: Animalia
- Phylum: Arthropoda
- Class: Insecta
- Order: Coleoptera
- Suborder: Polyphaga
- Infraorder: Cucujiformia
- Family: Cerambycidae
- Genus: Hippopsis
- Species: H. griseola

Binomial name
- Hippopsis griseola Bates, 1866

Species of beetle

Hippopsis griseola is a species of beetle in the family Cerambycidae. It was described by Bates in 1866.
