= Allodynerus floricola =

Scientific classification
- Kingdom: Animalia
- Phylum: Arthropoda
- Clade: Pancrustacea
- Class: Insecta
- Order: Hymenoptera
- Family: Vespidae
- Genus: Allodynerus
- Species: A. floricola

Binomial name
- Allodynerus floricola (Saussure, 1853)

Species of wasp

Allodynerus floricola is a species of wasp in the family Vespidae.
