= Dichelus lucidus =

Scientific classification
- Kingdom: Animalia
- Phylum: Arthropoda
- Clade: Pancrustacea
- Class: Insecta
- Order: Coleoptera
- Suborder: Polyphaga
- Infraorder: Scarabaeiformia
- Family: Scarabaeidae
- Genus: Dichelus
- Species: D. lucidus

Binomial name
- Dichelus lucidus Péringuey, 1902

Species of beetle

Dichelus lucidus is a species of beetle of the family Scarabaeidae. It is found in South Africa (Western Cape).

== Description ==
Adults reach a length of about 6 mm (0.24 in). They are black, not distinctly metallic and shining. The elytra are testaceous and have some traces left on each side of the bands of obliquely disposed greyish-white scales. The pygidium is clothed with yellow scales, and the anterior legs are reddish. The head and pronotum are clothed with fulvous hairs, and the scutellum is without scales. The elytra have two faint costules on each side separating the three bands of scales.
