= Dichelus lugubris =

Scientific classification
- Kingdom: Animalia
- Phylum: Arthropoda
- Class: Insecta
- Order: Coleoptera
- Suborder: Polyphaga
- Infraorder: Scarabaeiformia
- Family: Scarabaeidae
- Genus: Dichelus
- Species: D. lugubris

Binomial name
- Dichelus lugubris Kulzer, 1960

Species of beetle

Dichelus lugubris is a species of beetle of the family Scarabaeidae. It is found in South Africa (Western Cape).

== Description ==
Adults reach a length of about 3 mm (0.12 in). They are black, wit the elytra sometimes dark brown, and the legs reddish-brown. The elytra are sparsely but evenly covered with yellowish scales.
