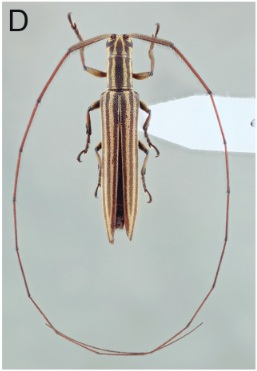

Scientific classification
- Kingdom: Animalia
- Phylum: Arthropoda
- Clade: Pancrustacea
- Class: Insecta
- Order: Coleoptera
- Suborder: Polyphaga
- Infraorder: Cucujiformia
- Family: Cerambycidae
- Genus: Hippopsis
- Species: H. prona

Binomial name
- Hippopsis prona Bates, 1866

Synonyms
- Hippopsis solangeae Carvalho, 1981

= Hippopsis prona =

Species of beetle

Hippopsis prona is a species of beetle in the family Cerambycidae. It was described by Bates in 1866. It is found in Ecuador, Bolivia, Peru, Brazil (Amazonas, Pará, Amapá, Alagoas, Goiás, Mato Grosso do Sul, Minas Gerais, Espirito Santo, Rio de Janeiro, São Paulo, Paraná), Paraguay and Argentina.
