= Hippopsis brevicollis =

Scientific classification
- Kingdom: Animalia
- Phylum: Arthropoda
- Class: Insecta
- Order: Coleoptera
- Suborder: Polyphaga
- Infraorder: Cucujiformia
- Family: Cerambycidae
- Genus: Hippopsis
- Species: H. brevicollis

Binomial name
- Hippopsis brevicollis Martins & Galileo, 2003

Species of beetle

Hippopsis brevicollis is a species of beetle in the family Cerambycidae. It was described by Martins and Galileo in 2003.
