= Dichelus purelli =

Scientific classification
- Kingdom: Animalia
- Phylum: Arthropoda
- Class: Insecta
- Order: Coleoptera
- Suborder: Polyphaga
- Infraorder: Scarabaeiformia
- Family: Scarabaeidae
- Genus: Dichelus
- Species: D. purelli

Binomial name
- Dichelus purelli Kulzer, 1960

Species of beetle

Dichelus purelli is a species of beetle of the family Scarabaeidae. It is found in South Africa (Western Cape).

== Description ==
Adults reach a length of about 4 mm (0.16 in). They are black, with the legs very dark brown. The elytra have a broad stripe of sparse, white hairy scales along the suture and there is sometimes a discal stripe, with sparse dark hairs in between.
