= Dichelus griseus =

Scientific classification
- Kingdom: Animalia
- Phylum: Arthropoda
- Class: Insecta
- Order: Coleoptera
- Suborder: Polyphaga
- Infraorder: Scarabaeiformia
- Family: Scarabaeidae
- Genus: Dichelus
- Species: D. griseus

Binomial name
- Dichelus griseus (Péringuey, 1908)

Synonyms
- Heterochelus griseus Péringuey, 1908

Species of beetle

Dichelus griseus is a species of beetle of the family Scarabaeidae. It is found in South Africa (Eastern Cape).

== Description ==
Adults reach a length of about 3.5 mm (0.14 in). They are black with red legs, and clothed on the pronotum and elytra with nearly contiguous, narrowly lanceolate, somewhat greyish scales. The sides of the abdomen and pygidial part are clothed with wider and contiguous yellowish white scales. The pronotum is scabrose and has a very short greyish pubescence. The elytra are non-costulate.
