= Dichelus simplicipes =

Scientific classification
- Kingdom: Animalia
- Phylum: Arthropoda
- Class: Insecta
- Order: Coleoptera
- Suborder: Polyphaga
- Infraorder: Scarabaeiformia
- Family: Scarabaeidae
- Genus: Dichelus
- Species: D. simplicipes

Binomial name
- Dichelus simplicipes (Burmeister, 1844)

Synonyms
- Heterochelus simplicipes Burmeister, 1844

Species of beetle

Dichelus simplicipes is a species of beetle of the family Scarabaeidae. It is found in South Africa (Western Cape).

== Description ==
Adults reach a length of about 5 mm (0.20 in). They are black, with the elytra dark chestnut-brown or reddish brown. The legs are the same colour as the elytra. The upper surface has a slight metallic tinge. The elytra have two interrupted bands of white scales on each side. The head and pronotum are densely hairy, with the hairs black. Along the base of the latter is a faint trace of a narrow band of appressed whitish squamose hairs.
