= Dichelus bipartitus =

Scientific classification
- Kingdom: Animalia
- Phylum: Arthropoda
- Class: Insecta
- Order: Coleoptera
- Suborder: Polyphaga
- Infraorder: Scarabaeiformia
- Family: Scarabaeidae
- Genus: Dichelus
- Species: D. bipartitus

Binomial name
- Dichelus bipartitus (Burmeister, 1844)

Synonyms
- Ischnochelus bipartitus Burmeister, 1844

Species of beetle

Dichelus bipartitus is a species of beetle of the family Scarabaeidae. It is found in South Africa (Cape).

== Description ==
Adults reach a length of about 5.25–6 mm (0.207–0.236 in). Males are black and shining, with the elytra and scutellum clothed with dense, contiguous, ovate yellow scales, and the pronotum with a narrow but very distinct basal band of similar scales. The edge of the propygidium, pygidium, and abdomen is densely scaly, with the scales yellow. The intermediate and hind legs are reddish. The head is rugose and hardly pubescent. The pronotum is nearly glabrous except for the narrow basal line of yellow scales which is continued on the outer margins. It is closely scabroso-punctate in the anterior part, but simply punctate towards the basal part, and the longitudinal median furrow is very deep. The elytra are entirely covered with comparatively large scales. Females are similar to males, but the pygidium is more convex.
