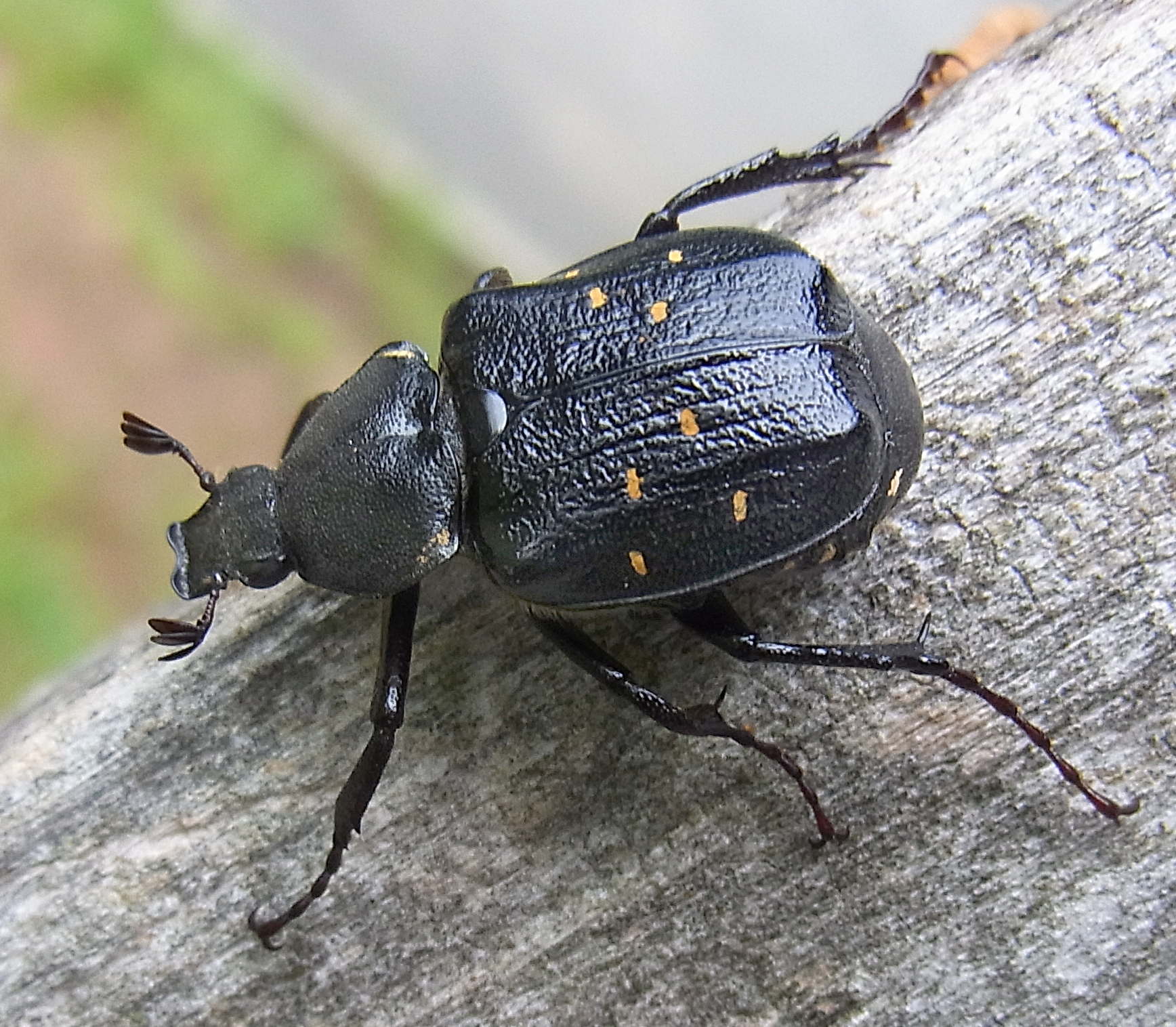

Conservation status
- Near Threatened (IUCN 3.1)

Scientific classification
- Kingdom: Animalia
- Phylum: Arthropoda
- Clade: Pancrustacea
- Class: Insecta
- Order: Coleoptera
- Suborder: Polyphaga
- Infraorder: Scarabaeiformia
- Family: Scarabaeidae
- Genus: Gnorimus
- Species: G. variabilis

Binomial name
- Gnorimus variabilis (Linnaeus, 1758)

Synonyms
- Scarabaeus variabilis Linnaeus, 1758; Aleurostictus variabilis basipennis Tauzin, 2000; Gnorimus octopunctatus flavopilosus Devecis, 1992; Gnorimus octopunctatus hyperalba Devecis, 1992; Gnorimus variabilis heydeni Beckers, 1888; Gnorimus variabilis ambiguus Mulsant, 1842; Gnorimus variabilis angularis Mulsant, 1842; Gnorimus variabilis juvencus Mulsant, 1842; Gnorimus variabilis nigricollis Mulsant, 1842; Trichius decempunctatus Schrank, 1798; Cetonia cordata Fabricius, 1787; Cetonia octopunctata Fabricius, 1775; Scarabaeus albopunctatus Degeer, 1774; Scarabaeus cursor niger Voet, 1769

= Gnorimus variabilis =

Species of beetle

Gnorimus variabilis, also known as the variable chafer, is a species of scarab beetle belonging to the subfamily Cetoniinae, the flower chafers. It was first described by Carl Linnaeus in 1758. The species is native to Europe and is usually found in oak and beech woods or parkland.

== Habitat ==
When the Gnorimus variabilis is a larva, it develops in wood mold like the trunks or the branches. Normally, larvae had a growing time of around 2 years. However that can depend on the environmental situation. Gnorimus variabilis is located in particular areas in different countries. For instance, it maybe found in conifers in Southern Europe. In the United Kingdom, it may be hidden in the old open-grown oak Quercus trees. In Spain, they may be located in oak forests and chestnut forests. In France, larvae lives in the wood mold of tree cavities, mainly Castanea and Quercus. In Ukraine, the larvae develops in wood and stubs of oak (Quercus), chestnut (Castanea), willow (Salix), and alder (Alnus).

== Gallery ==
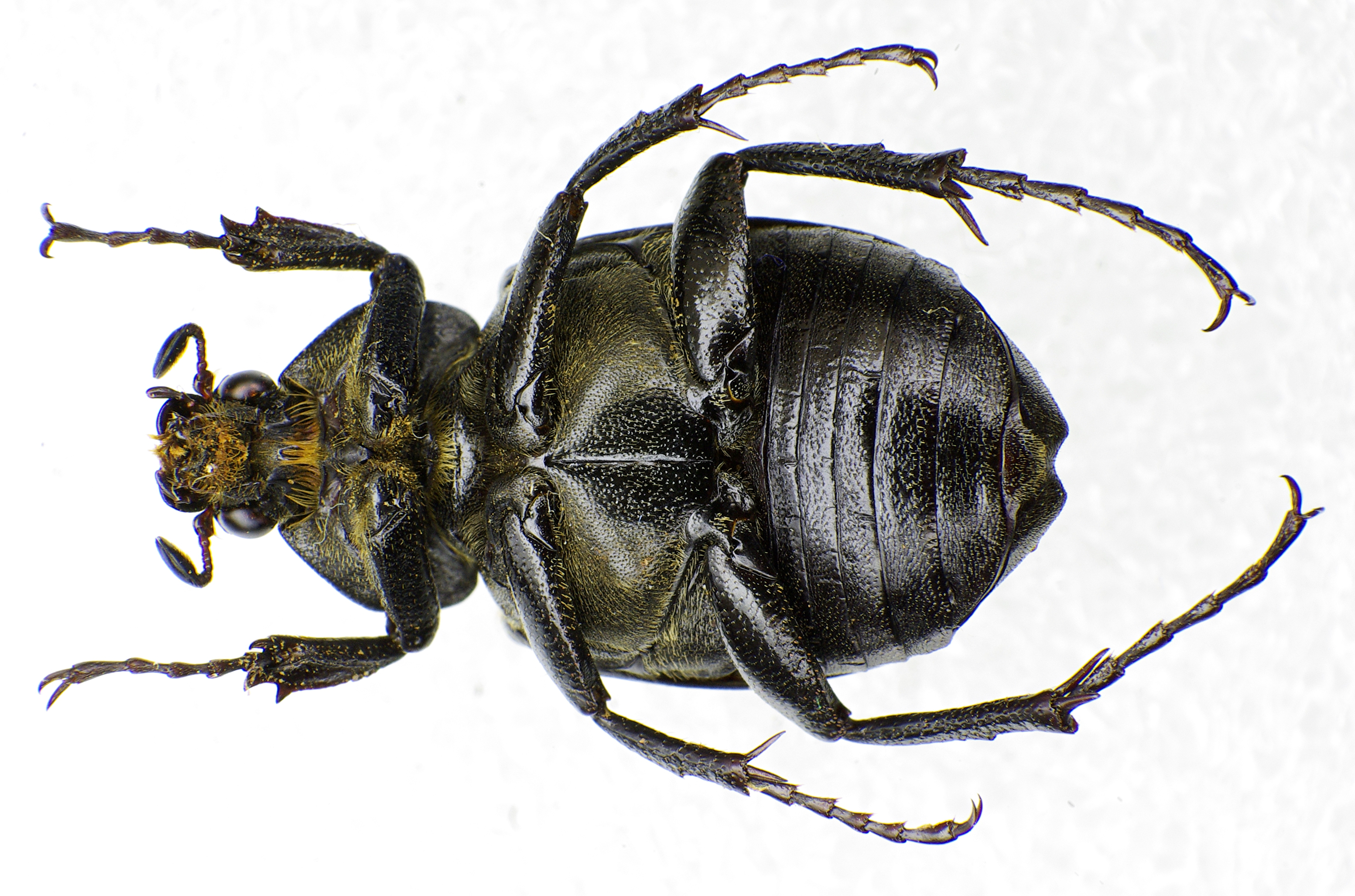
Underside of female

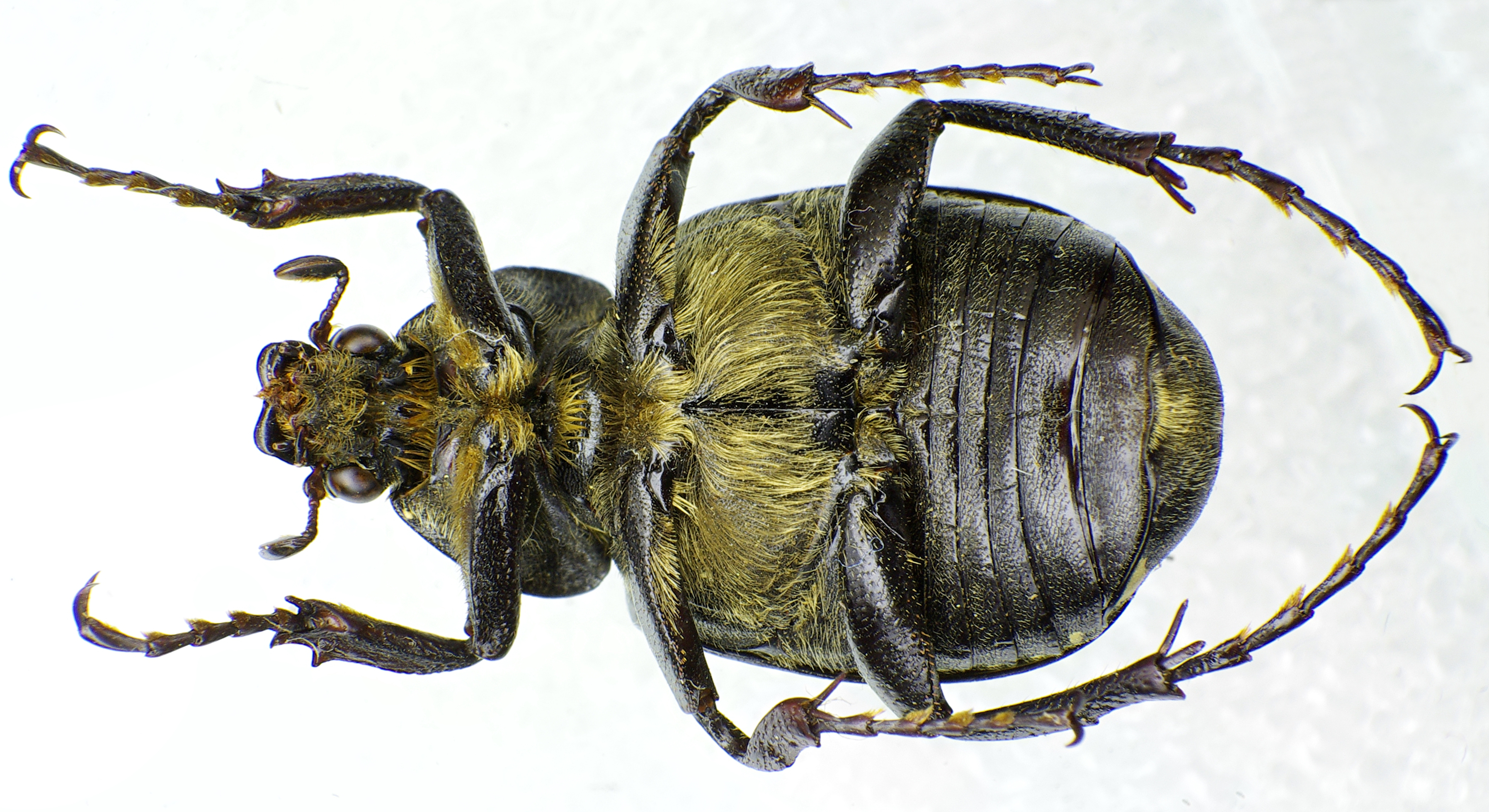
Underside of male
