= Dichelus luctuosus =

Scientific classification
- Kingdom: Animalia
- Phylum: Arthropoda
- Class: Insecta
- Order: Coleoptera
- Suborder: Polyphaga
- Infraorder: Scarabaeiformia
- Family: Scarabaeidae
- Genus: Dichelus
- Species: D. luctuosus

Binomial name
- Dichelus luctuosus Péringuey, 1902

Species of beetle

Dichelus luctuosus is a species of beetle of the family Scarabaeidae. It is found in South Africa (Western Cape).

== Description ==
Adults reach a length of about 6 mm (0.24 in). They are black and shining, the head and pronotum clothed with black hairs, and the former with an interrupted narrow band of white scales. The scutellum is scaly and the elytra have a narrow band of white scales. The pygidium is not scaly.
