= Chasme decora =

Scientific classification
- Kingdom: Animalia
- Phylum: Arthropoda
- Class: Insecta
- Order: Coleoptera
- Suborder: Polyphaga
- Infraorder: Scarabaeiformia
- Family: Scarabaeidae
- Genus: Chasme
- Species: C. decora

Binomial name
- Chasme decora (Wiedemann, 1823)

Synonyms
- Melolontha decora Wiedemann, 1823; Dichelus latipes Nonfried, 1891; Chasme nobilitata Burmeister, 1844

Species of beetle

Chasme decora is a species of beetle of the family Scarabaeidae. It is found in South Africa (Western Cape, Northern Cape).

== Description ==
Adults reach a length of about 6–7 mm (0.24–0.28 in). The head and pronotum are black, while the elytra and abdomen are testaceous-brown. The head is punctulate and clothed with black hairs except on the clypeus. The pronotum is clothed with dense hairs and covered with somewhat closely set orange-yellow, minute scales. The elytra have two longitudinal furrow clothed with minute orange scales which also cover the slightly raised costae. There is a series of long, bristle-like hairs along the outer margin.
