= Dichelus minutus =

Scientific classification
- Kingdom: Animalia
- Phylum: Arthropoda
- Class: Insecta
- Order: Coleoptera
- Suborder: Polyphaga
- Infraorder: Scarabaeiformia
- Family: Scarabaeidae
- Genus: Dichelus
- Species: D. minutus

Binomial name
- Dichelus minutus (Burmeister, 1844)

Synonyms
- Ischnochelus minutus Burmeister, 1844; Heterochelus minutus

Species of beetle

Dichelus minutus is a species of beetle of the family Scarabaeidae. It is found in South Africa (Eastern Cape, Western Cape).

== Description ==
Adults reach a length of about 3–3.5 mm (0.12–0.14 in). Males are black and shining. The head is scabroso-punctate and very briefly pubescent. The pronotum is closely scabroso-punctate, but with the punctures deeper and simple in the posterior part, clothed with short, sparse, sub-appressed slightly flavescent hairs, it is distinctly convex and the median groove is deep and disappears only at a short distance from the apical margin. The scutellum is clothed with squamulose greyish-white hairs. The elytra have two costae on the disk, the inner one being the more distinct, and the humeral callus is also costate, the three intervals are more or less densely filled with appressed whitish or slightly flavescent hairs which are more numerous on the juxta-sutural interval, but which in the posterior part and along the apical margin turn into flavescent, somewhat rounded scales. The propygidium and pygidium are clothed with dense, contiguous yellow scales which are somewhat deeper orange on the pygidium. Females are similar to males, but the scales on the pygidial part are lighter.
