= Dichelus timidus =

Scientific classification
- Kingdom: Animalia
- Phylum: Arthropoda
- Class: Insecta
- Order: Coleoptera
- Suborder: Polyphaga
- Infraorder: Scarabaeiformia
- Family: Scarabaeidae
- Genus: Dichelus
- Species: D. timidus

Binomial name
- Dichelus timidus (Burmeister, 1844)

Synonyms
- Ischnochelus timidus Burmeister, 1844

Species of beetle

Dichelus timidus is a species of beetle of the family Scarabaeidae. It is found in South Africa (Northern Cape).

== Description ==
Adults reach a length of about 4–4.5 mm (0.16–0.18 in). Males are black, with the elytra light testaceous, but somewhat infuscate in the anterior part. The legs are rufescent. The head is very briefly pubescent, and very rugose. The pronotum is very closely scabroso-punctate almost all over, and very briefly pubescent, but having along the base and also the outer margin a narrow band of slightly flavescent, appressed, sub-squamose hairs, and a few similar ones in the posterior part of the deep, median sulcus. The scutellum is densely scaly. The elytra have a broad band of somewhat closely set, ovate, flavescent scales along the suture, which is continued round the apical part, and ascends along the outer margins to the humeral part, the space between this sutural and outer marginal band is filled with somewhat remote but similar scales which do not, however, form bands. Female are similar to males, but the elytra are a little less infuscate behind, and the scales are replaced by squamiform hairs.
