= Dichelus dentipes =

Scientific classification
- Kingdom: Animalia
- Phylum: Arthropoda
- Clade: Pancrustacea
- Class: Insecta
- Order: Coleoptera
- Suborder: Polyphaga
- Infraorder: Scarabaeiformia
- Family: Scarabaeidae
- Genus: Dichelus
- Species: D. dentipes

Binomial name
- Dichelus dentipes (Fabricius, 1781)

Synonyms
- Melolontha dentipes Fabricius, 1781

Species of beetle

Dichelus dentipes is a species of beetle of the family Scarabaeidae. It is found in South Africa (Western Cape).

== Description ==
Adults reach a length of about 6.5–7.5 mm (0.26–0.30 in). Males are black, with the elytra testaceous red or with the basal part only broadly testaceous red, and the rest fuscous or entirely black. The head briefly but densely hairy and bristly laterally. The pronotum has black hairs, which are longer on the sides than on the disk and along the base there is a narrow fringe of not closely set appressed, yellowish hairs. The elytra are shining, but clothed with minute greyish hairs. The pygidium is clothed with small, contiguous, bright yellow scales. Females are black, with the elytra light testaceous, clothed with dense greyish hairs, except on the elytra and the pygidium. The latter is entirely clothed with bright yellow scales.
