= Dichelus vittatus =

Scientific classification
- Kingdom: Animalia
- Phylum: Arthropoda
- Class: Insecta
- Order: Coleoptera
- Suborder: Polyphaga
- Infraorder: Scarabaeiformia
- Family: Scarabaeidae
- Genus: Dichelus
- Species: D. vittatus

Binomial name
- Dichelus vittatus (Burmeister, 1844)

Synonyms
- Heterochelus vittatus Burmeister, 1844

Species of beetle

Dichelus vittatus is a species of beetle of the family Scarabaeidae. It is found in South Africa (Cape).

== Description ==
Adults reach a length of about 7–7.5 mm (0.28–0.30 in). They are black, with the elytra chestnut-brown, and the legs chestnut-brown or chestnut-red. The head and pronotum are clothed with greyish or slightly flavescent scales which become much denser in the posterior part. The elytra have three longitudinal bands of sub-flavescent scales. The pygidium is scaly.
