= Amédée Louis Michel le Peletier, comte de Saint-Fargeau =

French entomologist

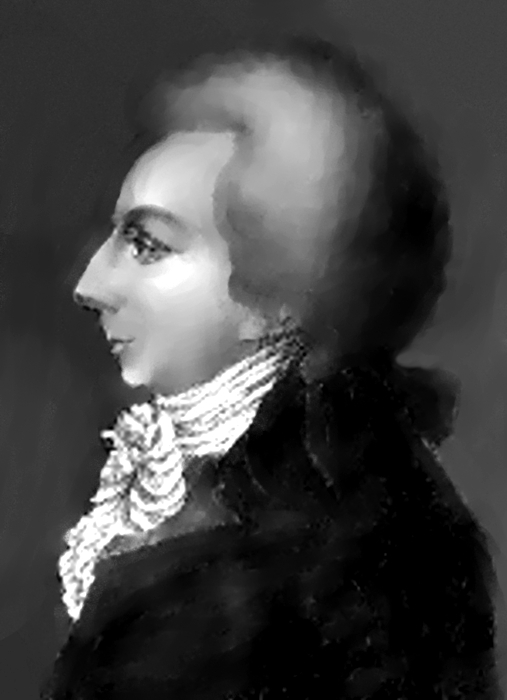
Amédée Louis Michel Lepeletier de Saint Fargeau

Amédée Louis Michel le Peletier, comte de Saint-Fargeau (9 October 1770 – 23 August 1845), also spelled Lepeletier or Lepelletier, was a French entomologist, and specialist in Hymenoptera.

In 1833, he served as president of the Société entomologique de France.

== Works ==
- with Gaspard Auguste Brullé Histoire naturelle des insectes. Hyménoptères. Roret, Paris 1836–46 p.m.
- Memoires sur le G. Gorytes Latr. Arpactus Jur. Paris 1832.
- Monographia tenthredinetarum, synonimia extricata. Levrault, Paris 1823–25.
- Mémoire sur quelques espéces nouvelles d'Insectes de la section des hyménoptères appelés les portetuyaux et sur les caractères de cette famille et des genres qui la composent. Paris 1806.
- Défense de Félix Lepeletier. Vatar, Paris 1796/97.
- with Jean Guillaume Audinet-Serville a treatise on Hemiptera to Guillaume-Antoine Olivier's Histoire naturelle. Entomologie, ou histoire naturelle des Crustacés, des Arachnides et des Insectes (Encyclopédie Méthodique)
