= Heterochelus adspersus =

Scientific classification
- Kingdom: Animalia
- Phylum: Arthropoda
- Class: Insecta
- Order: Coleoptera
- Suborder: Polyphaga
- Infraorder: Scarabaeiformia
- Family: Scarabaeidae
- Genus: Heterochelus
- Species: H. adspersus

Binomial name
- Heterochelus adspersus Péringuey, 1902

Species of beetle

Heterochelus adspersus is a species of beetle of the family Scarabaeidae. It is found in South Africa (Western Cape).

== Description ==
Adults reach a length of about 6 mm (0.24 in). They are very similar to Heterochelus murinus. The shape, size, and sculpture are similar, but the scales with which the elytra are very abundantly sprinkled are rounder and broader, the hind legs are black, and the pygidium is much less convex in males than in H. murinus. The females of the two species cannot be distinguished from each other.
