= Heterochelus hayeki =

Scientific classification
- Kingdom: Animalia
- Phylum: Arthropoda
- Class: Insecta
- Order: Coleoptera
- Suborder: Polyphaga
- Infraorder: Scarabaeiformia
- Family: Scarabaeidae
- Genus: Heterochelus
- Species: H. hayeki

Binomial name
- Heterochelus hayeki Kulzer, 1960

Species of beetle

Heterochelus hayeki is a species of beetle of the family Scarabaeidae. It is found in South Africa (Eastern Cape).

== Description ==
Adults reach a length of about 5–5.5 mm (0.20–0.22 in). They are very similar to Heterochelus gracilis. They have a black body (including the legs). The elytra have a large, brown and longitudinal spot on each side.
