= Heterochelus concinnus =

Scientific classification
- Kingdom: Animalia
- Phylum: Arthropoda
- Class: Insecta
- Order: Coleoptera
- Suborder: Polyphaga
- Infraorder: Scarabaeiformia
- Family: Scarabaeidae
- Genus: Heterochelus
- Species: H. concinnus

Binomial name
- Heterochelus concinnus Péringuey, 1902

Species of beetle

Heterochelus concinnus is a species of beetle of the family Scarabaeidae. It is found in South Africa (North West).

== Description ==
Adults reach a length of about 6.5 mm (0.26 in). Only the head is black, and the body is light testaceous red, the hind legs with a metallic tinge. It is similar to Heterochelus mimus, and is also clothed with yellow scales which are, however, a little paler. The pygidium has two very distinct basal brown patches which are entirely absent in H. mimus.
