= Heterochelus furoninus =

Scientific classification
- Kingdom: Animalia
- Phylum: Arthropoda
- Class: Insecta
- Order: Coleoptera
- Suborder: Polyphaga
- Infraorder: Scarabaeiformia
- Family: Scarabaeidae
- Genus: Heterochelus
- Species: H. furoninus

Binomial name
- Heterochelus furoninus Burmeister, 1844

Synonyms
- Heterochelus contractus Boheman, 1857; Heterochelus pruinosus Boheman, 1857

Species of beetle

Heterochelus furoninus is a species of beetle of the family Scarabaeidae. It is found in South Africa (KwaZulu-Natal).

== Description ==
Adults reach a length of about 4.5–6 mm (0.18–0.24 in). They are similar to Heterochelus gonager, but the colour of the back ground is redder brown, the head only being black. The squamose, lanciform hairs are not set very close to each other on the pronotum, and the elytra are feebly costate, the costae being set with short lanciform, squamose setae. The costae and the intervals are filled with round scales which are a little lighter in the intervals. The pygidium is clothed with yellow-ochre scales.
