= Heterochelus indigens =

Scientific classification
- Kingdom: Animalia
- Phylum: Arthropoda
- Clade: Pancrustacea
- Class: Insecta
- Order: Coleoptera
- Suborder: Polyphaga
- Infraorder: Scarabaeiformia
- Family: Scarabaeidae
- Genus: Heterochelus
- Species: H. indigens

Binomial name
- Heterochelus indigens Péringuey, 1902

Species of beetle

Heterochelus indigens is a species of beetle of the family Scarabaeidae. It is found in South Africa (Cape).

== Description ==
Adults reach a length of about 4 mm (0.16 in). They are black, with the elytra and legs chocolate-brown, and the anterior legs redder. The facies and vestiture are similar to those of Heterochelus pulverosus, but it is much smaller, and the shape of the hind tibiae is different.
