= Heterochelus insignis =

Scientific classification
- Kingdom: Animalia
- Phylum: Arthropoda
- Class: Insecta
- Order: Coleoptera
- Suborder: Polyphaga
- Infraorder: Scarabaeiformia
- Family: Scarabaeidae
- Genus: Heterochelus
- Species: H. insignis

Binomial name
- Heterochelus insignis Péringuey, 1902

Species of beetle

Heterochelus insignis is a species of beetle of the family Scarabaeidae. It is found in South Africa (Western Cape).

== Description ==
Adults reach a length of about 6–7.25 mm (0.236–0.285 in). Males are black, with the elytra testaceous or reddish brown, often a little infuscate, and almost entirely covered with round not contiguous light yellow scales, or having three bands of scales on each side. These bands are often obliterated but there are nearly always traces of the juxta-sutural one left. The legs are reddish. The pronotum is covered with a short, erect black pubescence mixed occasionally with sub-villose flavescent hairs, in which case half the posterior part of the disk is covered with yellow or flavescent scales somewhat contiguous in the basal part. The scutellum is scaly and the propygidium and abdominal segments are edged with yellowish or yellowish-white. The pygidium is deeply punctured, but without scales. Females are exactly like the females of Heterochelus arthriticus.
