= Heterochelus molestus =

Scientific classification
- Kingdom: Animalia
- Phylum: Arthropoda
- Class: Insecta
- Order: Coleoptera
- Suborder: Polyphaga
- Infraorder: Scarabaeiformia
- Family: Scarabaeidae
- Genus: Heterochelus
- Species: H. molestus

Binomial name
- Heterochelus molestus Péringuey, 1908

Species of beetle

Heterochelus molestus is a species of beetle of the family Scarabaeidae. It is found in South Africa (North West).

== Description ==
Adults reach a length of about 5.5 mm (0.22 in). The colour, shape, and vestiture are the same as in Heterochelus shilouvanus, from which it differs in the absence of the trochanterine spine of the hind femora and the vestiture of the pygidium, which is velvety black with a triangular apical patch of yellow scales. The elytra are equally highly costate, but they, and also all the legs, are reddish.
