= Heterochelus persimilis =

Scientific classification
- Kingdom: Animalia
- Phylum: Arthropoda
- Class: Insecta
- Order: Coleoptera
- Suborder: Polyphaga
- Infraorder: Scarabaeiformia
- Family: Scarabaeidae
- Genus: Heterochelus
- Species: H. persimilis

Binomial name
- Heterochelus persimilis Péringuey, 1902

Species of beetle

Heterochelus persimilis is a species of beetle of the family Scarabaeidae. It is found in South Africa (Eastern Cape, Western Cape).

== Description ==
Adults reach a length of about 5 mm (0.20 in). Males are very similar to Heterochelus promontorii, but the body is a little more elongate, the pronotum is distinctly grooved in the posterior part, the punctures are much more scattered, deeper and not scabrose. The elytra have four narrow bands of white scales on each side and are redder, but the punctuation is the same. The pygidium is black and not scaly, and the scutellum densely scaly. The legs are black. The head and pronotum of the females are as in males, and they are similarly sculptured. The elytra and pygidium are redder than in H. promontorii.
