= Heterochelus simulans =

Scientific classification
- Kingdom: Animalia
- Phylum: Arthropoda
- Class: Insecta
- Order: Coleoptera
- Suborder: Polyphaga
- Infraorder: Scarabaeiformia
- Family: Scarabaeidae
- Genus: Heterochelus
- Species: H. simulans

Binomial name
- Heterochelus simulans Péringuey, 1902

Species of beetle

Heterochelus simulans is a species of beetle of the family Scarabaeidae. It is found in South Africa (Western Cape).

== Description ==
Adults reach a length of about 3–4.5 mm (0.12–0.18 in). They are very similar to Heterochelus forcipatus. The size and shape of the hind legs are the same, but the head is quadridentate and the outer teeth are not so developed nor so reflexed. Furthermore, the elytra are somewhat bi-costulate on each side and have three or four bands of orange-yellow nearly contiguous scales, and the propygidium, pygidium, and abdomen are clothed with similar scales, but the pygidium also has two basal dark patches.
