= Heterochelus fraternus =

Scientific classification
- Kingdom: Animalia
- Phylum: Arthropoda
- Class: Insecta
- Order: Coleoptera
- Suborder: Polyphaga
- Infraorder: Scarabaeiformia
- Family: Scarabaeidae
- Genus: Heterochelus
- Species: H. fraternus

Binomial name
- Heterochelus fraternus Péringuey, 1902

Species of beetle

Heterochelus fraternus is a species of beetle of the family Scarabaeidae. It is found in South Africa (Western Cape).

== Description ==
Adults reach a length of about 4.75–5 mm (0.187–0.197 in). Males are very similar to Heterochelus analis. The shape, size, and hind legs are also similar, but the vestiture is different. The median groove of the pronotum and the hase have a band of flavescent or golden-yellow scales. The scutellum is scaly and the elytra have two moderately raised, yet distinct costae on each side, and four somewhat broad bands of rounded, dense, yellow- or yellowish scales. The propygidium and sides of the abdomen are very densely scaly and so is the pygidium, the scales of which are, however, of a uniform tint. Females are densely hairy on the pronotum and the elytra are pale testaceous, and clothed with dense greyish hairs. There is also an apical band of yellow scales on the elytra. The pygidium and sides of the abdomen are covered with light orange-yellow scales.
