= Heterochelus chiragricus =

Scientific classification
- Kingdom: Animalia
- Phylum: Arthropoda
- Class: Insecta
- Order: Coleoptera
- Suborder: Polyphaga
- Infraorder: Scarabaeiformia
- Family: Scarabaeidae
- Genus: Heterochelus
- Species: H. chiragricus

Binomial name
- Heterochelus chiragricus (Thunberg, 1818)

Synonyms
- Trichius chiragricus Thunberg, 1818

Species of beetle

Heterochelus chiragricus is a species of beetle of the family Scarabaeidae. It is found in South Africa (Cape).

== Description ==
Adults reach a length of about 9.5 mm (0.37 in). Males are similar to Heterochelus podagricus, but the scutellum is not scaly and the elytra are more attenuate laterally towards the apex, and they have a broad juxta-sutural band of yellow scales reaching from the base to the apex where it unites with a marginal one of nearly the same width. The propygidium and pygidium are glabrous.
