= Heterochelus oreopygus =

Scientific classification
- Kingdom: Animalia
- Phylum: Arthropoda
- Class: Insecta
- Order: Coleoptera
- Suborder: Polyphaga
- Infraorder: Scarabaeiformia
- Family: Scarabaeidae
- Genus: Heterochelus
- Species: H. oreopygus

Binomial name
- Heterochelus oreopygus Burmeister, 1844

Species of beetle

Heterochelus oreopygus is a species of beetle of the family Scarabaeidae. It is found in South Africa (Eastern Cape, Western Cape).

== Description ==
Adults reach a length of about 4 mm (0.16 in). They are similar to Heterochelus armatus, but smaller and the pygidium is hairless and shining.
