= Heterochelus placatus =

Scientific classification
- Kingdom: Animalia
- Phylum: Arthropoda
- Class: Insecta
- Order: Coleoptera
- Suborder: Polyphaga
- Infraorder: Scarabaeiformia
- Family: Scarabaeidae
- Genus: Heterochelus
- Species: H. placatus

Binomial name
- Heterochelus placatus Péringuey, 1902

Species of beetle

Heterochelus placatus is a species of beetle of the family Scarabaeidae. It is found in South Africa (KwaZulu-Natal).

== Description ==
Adults reach a length of about 5.5–6 mm (0.22–0.24 in). They are very similar to Heterochelus ictericus, but the scales are more yellow or even deep ochre, and the elytra are very slightly bi-costate.
