= Heterochelus bisignatus =

Scientific classification
- Kingdom: Animalia
- Phylum: Arthropoda
- Class: Insecta
- Order: Coleoptera
- Suborder: Polyphaga
- Infraorder: Scarabaeiformia
- Family: Scarabaeidae
- Genus: Heterochelus
- Species: H. bisignatus

Binomial name
- Heterochelus bisignatus Blanchard, 1850

Species of beetle

Heterochelus bisignatus is a species of beetle of the family Scarabaeidae. It is found in South Africa (Cape).

== Description ==
Adults reach a length of about 5 mm (0.20 in). The size of Heterochelus binotatus, but a little larger. The under side has white hairs and the pronotum is punctate, setose and deeply sulcate behind in the centre. The scutellum is clothed with yellow scales and the elytra are slightly tri-costate, with the intervals filled with fulvous scales. The pygidium is flavescent and has two fuscous patches. The legs are piceous.
