= Heterochelus sexlineatus =

Scientific classification
- Kingdom: Animalia
- Phylum: Arthropoda
- Class: Insecta
- Order: Coleoptera
- Suborder: Polyphaga
- Infraorder: Scarabaeiformia
- Family: Scarabaeidae
- Genus: Heterochelus
- Species: H. sexlineatus

Binomial name
- Heterochelus sexlineatus (Thunberg, 1818)

Synonyms
- Trichius sexlineatus Thunberg, 1818; Trichius latipes Wiedemann, 1821

Species of beetle

Heterochelus sexlineatus is a species of beetle of the family Scarabaeidae. It is found in South Africa (Western Cape).

== Description ==
Adults reach a length of about 7–8 mm (0.28–0.31 in). They are very similar to Heterochelus vulpinus. The shape, vestiture, and disposition of the scales are similar, the colour of the elytra and legs is often metallic black, the scales are often whitish, but the distinctive character consists in the presence of a distinct spinose tooth in the inner part of the knee, and of two distinct ones, facing each other at the basal part of the tibias, at the beginning of the grooved part.
