= Heterochelus rufimanus =

Scientific classification
- Kingdom: Animalia
- Phylum: Arthropoda
- Class: Insecta
- Order: Coleoptera
- Suborder: Polyphaga
- Infraorder: Scarabaeiformia
- Family: Scarabaeidae
- Genus: Heterochelus
- Species: H. rufimanus

Binomial name
- Heterochelus rufimanus (Laporte, 1840)

Synonyms
- Monochelus rufimanus Laporte, 1840; Heterochelus longulus Burmeister, 1844

Species of beetle

Heterochelus rufimanus is a species of beetle of the family Scarabaeidae. It is found in South Africa (Western Cape).

== Description ==
Adults reach a length of about 5–7 mm (0.20–0.28 in). Males are black, with the front legs reddish, and as often as not with the elytra chestnut-brown, or chestnut-red. The elytra have a narrow apical margin of flavescent or yellow scales, the scutellum and abdomen are densely scaly, but the pygidium is glabrous and shining, and there is only a very narrow band of scales on the propygidium. Females are similar to males, but the elytra are covered with appressed, somewhat remote hairs, and have a few somewhat squamose ones along the suture.
