= Heterochelus cristaticeps =

Scientific classification
- Kingdom: Animalia
- Phylum: Arthropoda
- Class: Insecta
- Order: Coleoptera
- Suborder: Polyphaga
- Infraorder: Scarabaeiformia
- Family: Scarabaeidae
- Genus: Heterochelus
- Species: H. cristaticeps

Binomial name
- Heterochelus cristaticeps Péringuey, 1908

Species of beetle

Heterochelus cristaticeps is a species of beetle of the family Scarabaeidae. It is found in South Africa (Eastern Cape).

== Description ==
Adults reach a length of about 4.5–6 mm (0.18–0.24 in). Males are black with the elytra triangularly flavescent from the base to past the median part. From the apex of the head to the median part of the clypeus are three transverse, parallel rows of upright, closely set and long, spine-like black setae. The pronotum is clothed with a brief, black pubescence, moderately deeply grooved in the centre, and has no vestiges of scales. The elytra are non-costulate and very briefly pubescent. The propygidium and upper side of the abdomen are clothed with long light fulvescent hairs and the pygidium is deeply punctate and glabrous. Females are similar to males, but the transverse row of bristles on the clypeus is very minute and the elytra are completely flavescent. The pubescence on the sides of the abdomen and the pygidium, which is also red instead of black, is greyish and only moderately dense.
