= Heterochelus poweri =

Scientific classification
- Kingdom: Animalia
- Phylum: Arthropoda
- Class: Insecta
- Order: Coleoptera
- Suborder: Polyphaga
- Infraorder: Scarabaeiformia
- Family: Scarabaeidae
- Genus: Heterochelus
- Species: H. poweri

Binomial name
- Heterochelus poweri Kulzer, 1960

Species of beetle

Heterochelus poweri is a species of beetle of the family Scarabaeidae. It is found in South Africa (Northern Cape).

== Description ==
Adults reach a length of about 5 mm (0.20 in). The head, pronotum and scutellum are black, while the two anterior pairs of legs and the antennae are dark brown. The hind legs, pygidium and abdomen are light reddish-brown. The elytra are pale yellow.
