= Heterochelus zumpti =

Scientific classification
- Kingdom: Animalia
- Phylum: Arthropoda
- Class: Insecta
- Order: Coleoptera
- Suborder: Polyphaga
- Infraorder: Scarabaeiformia
- Family: Scarabaeidae
- Genus: Heterochelus
- Species: H. zumpti

Binomial name
- Heterochelus zumpti Kulzer, 1960

Species of beetle

Heterochelus zumpti is a species of beetle of the family Scarabaeidae. It is found in South Africa (North West).

== Description ==
Adults reach a length of about 6–8 mm (0.24–0.31 in). The head is black, while the underside is black or dark brown. The pronotum is brown with small dark spots, or black with a green shimmer. The legs and elytra are reddish-brown, the latter with three scale bands each. The scales are yellow, and there are ridges with yellowish, pointed scales on each elytron.
