= Heterochelus bimucronatus =

Scientific classification
- Kingdom: Animalia
- Phylum: Arthropoda
- Class: Insecta
- Order: Coleoptera
- Suborder: Polyphaga
- Infraorder: Scarabaeiformia
- Family: Scarabaeidae
- Genus: Heterochelus
- Species: H. bimucronatus

Binomial name
- Heterochelus bimucronatus Kulzer, 1960

Species of beetle

Heterochelus bimucronatus is a species of beetle of the family Scarabaeidae. It is found in South Africa (Western Cape, Northern Cape).

== Description ==
Adults reach a length of about 6–7 mm (0.24–0.28 in). They are black, with the elytra dark brown, the legs reddish-brown and the antennae black. The base of the pronotum, scutellum, elytra, pygidium, propygidium and abdomen are all covered with greyish-yellow to brownish-yellow scales. The abdomen is mostly white. The head, pronotum, underside and partly also the legs, have white erect hairs.

== Subspecies ==
- Heterochelus bimucronatus bimucronatus (Western Cape)
- Heterochelus bimucronatus unimucronatus Kulzer, 1960 (Northern Cape)
