= Heterochelus carus =

Scientific classification
- Kingdom: Animalia
- Phylum: Arthropoda
- Class: Insecta
- Order: Coleoptera
- Suborder: Polyphaga
- Infraorder: Scarabaeiformia
- Family: Scarabaeidae
- Genus: Heterochelus
- Species: H. carus

Binomial name
- Heterochelus carus Kulzer, 1960

Species of beetle

Heterochelus carus is a species of beetle of the family Scarabaeidae. It is found in South Africa (Eastern Cape).

== Description ==
Adults reach a length of about 7 mm (0.28 in). The head, pronotum and abdomen are black, while the legs and elytra are brown, the latter darkened at the base and at the suture line. Each elytron has a broad suture, a very narrow discal band and a similarly narrow lateral band of long, pointed grey scales, with weak ribs.
