= Heterochelus auricollis =

Scientific classification
- Kingdom: Animalia
- Phylum: Arthropoda
- Clade: Pancrustacea
- Class: Insecta
- Order: Coleoptera
- Suborder: Polyphaga
- Infraorder: Scarabaeiformia
- Family: Scarabaeidae
- Genus: Heterochelus
- Species: H. auricollis

Binomial name
- Heterochelus auricollis Burmeister, 1855

Species of beetle

Heterochelus auricollis is a species of beetle of the family Scarabaeidae. It is found in South Africa (KwaZulu-Natal).

== Description ==
Adults reach a length of about 6.5–7 mm (0.26–0.28 in). The head is black, while the rest of the body is light reddish-brown. The pronotum has short, erect, bristle-like hairs. The pygidium is covered with yellow scales with small black spots at the base. The scales on the elytra are dense and yellowish. In females, the pronotum is very dark brown.
