= Heterochelus egens =

Scientific classification
- Kingdom: Animalia
- Phylum: Arthropoda
- Class: Insecta
- Order: Coleoptera
- Suborder: Polyphaga
- Infraorder: Scarabaeiformia
- Family: Scarabaeidae
- Genus: Heterochelus
- Species: H. egens

Binomial name
- Heterochelus egens Péringuey, 1902

Synonyms
- Heterochelus amoenulus Péringuey, 1902

Species of beetle

Heterochelus egens is a species of beetle of the family Scarabaeidae. It is found in South Africa (KwaZulu-Natal, Northern Cape).

== Description ==
Adults reach a length of about 4–4.5 mm (0.16–0.18 in). They are black, covered with greyish scales and sometimes with a slight flavescent tinge on the whole surface as well as on the pygidium and the sides of the abdomen. The legs are rufescent. The head and pronotum are densely squamose, with the scales being similar to those of the elytra, but not so closely set. The scutellum is scaly.
