= Heterochelus detritus =

Scientific classification
- Kingdom: Animalia
- Phylum: Arthropoda
- Class: Insecta
- Order: Coleoptera
- Suborder: Polyphaga
- Infraorder: Scarabaeiformia
- Family: Scarabaeidae
- Genus: Heterochelus
- Species: H. detritus

Binomial name
- Heterochelus detritus Burmeister, 1844

Species of beetle

Heterochelus detritus is a species of beetle of the family Scarabaeidae. It is found in South Africa (Northern Cape, Western Cape).

== Description ==
Adults reach a length of about 8.5–10 mm (0.33–0.39 in). Males are black, with the elytra sienna-brown and the hind legs reddish and the anterior and intermediate legs piceous. The head and pronotum are finely and very densely scabrose and clothed with a short but erect pubescence, which is flavescent on the head, black on the disk, but turning to greyish above that part of the base which adjoins the scutellum. The scutellum is clothed with dense greyish hairs and the elytra are indistinctly multi-striate, and have, in addition to a single row along the suture, three duplicate series of very short, dark brown setae. The propygidium and pygidium are glabrous and piceous brown. The head, pronotum, scutellum and pectus of the females are covered with a sub-flavescent pubescence which is denser and longer than in males, and the elytra and abdomen are very light testaceous.
