= Heterochelus burmeisteri =

Scientific classification
- Kingdom: Animalia
- Phylum: Arthropoda
- Class: Insecta
- Order: Coleoptera
- Suborder: Polyphaga
- Infraorder: Scarabaeiformia
- Family: Scarabaeidae
- Genus: Heterochelus
- Species: H. burmeisteri

Binomial name
- Heterochelus burmeisteri Dalla Torre, 1913

Synonyms
- Heterochelus aurantiacus Burmeister, 1844 (preocc.)

Species of beetle

Heterochelus burmeisteri is a species of beetle of the family Scarabaeidae. It is found in South Africa (Cape).

== Description ==
Adults reach a length of about 4 mm (0.16 in). They are black and covered with light golden-yellow scales. The legs are red. The pronotum is clothed with yellow scales, which are slightly more elongate than those on the scutellum and elytra, which are rounder and a little denser. The propygidium, pygidium, and sides of the abdomen are densely scaly, the scales being of the same colour as those on the elytra.
