= Heterochelus multidentatus =

Scientific classification
- Kingdom: Animalia
- Phylum: Arthropoda
- Class: Insecta
- Order: Coleoptera
- Suborder: Polyphaga
- Infraorder: Scarabaeiformia
- Family: Scarabaeidae
- Genus: Heterochelus
- Species: H. multidentatus

Binomial name
- Heterochelus multidentatus Burmeister, 1844

Species of beetle

Heterochelus multidentatus is a species of beetle of the family Scarabaeidae. It is found in South Africa (Western Cape, Eastern Cape).

== Description ==
Adults reach a length of about 6.5–7.5 mm (0.26–0.30 in). They are greenish metallic black, with the antennae (except the club) reddish. The elytra have three bands of whitish or slightly flavescent scales on each side. The head and pronotum are closely punctate and clothed with greyish and black erect hairs. Along the base of the pronotum are a few whitish grey, remote, squamose appressed hairs. The scutellum is clothed with greyish scales. The elytra are bi-costate on each side, with the three spaces intervening between the suture and the two costae filled with a band of dense, ovate whitish scales. The propygidium, pygidium and abdomen are covered with contiguous yellowish scales which are occasionally deep orange at the base.
