= Heterochelus femoralis =

Scientific classification
- Kingdom: Animalia
- Phylum: Arthropoda
- Class: Insecta
- Order: Coleoptera
- Suborder: Polyphaga
- Infraorder: Scarabaeiformia
- Family: Scarabaeidae
- Genus: Heterochelus
- Species: H. femoralis

Binomial name
- Heterochelus femoralis Péringuey, 1902

Species of beetle

Heterochelus femoralis is a species of beetle of the family Scarabaeidae. It is found in South Africa (North West).

== Description ==
Adults reach a length of about 5–6.5 mm (0.20–0.26 in). They are black, with the elytra and legs brownish red. The elytra are clothed with small, round yellow scales. The head and pronotum are punctate and clothed with partly appressed, partly erect flavous hairs, and having a more or less distinct basal band of elongate scales, which also partly fill the posterior part of the longitudinal median groove. The scutellum is clothed with lanceolate scales and the propygidium and pygidium are covered with very minute contiguous scales.
