= Heterochelus scheini =

Scientific classification
- Kingdom: Animalia
- Phylum: Arthropoda
- Class: Insecta
- Order: Coleoptera
- Suborder: Polyphaga
- Infraorder: Scarabaeiformia
- Family: Scarabaeidae
- Genus: Heterochelus
- Species: H. scheini

Binomial name
- Heterochelus scheini Kulzer, 1960

Species of beetle

Heterochelus scheini is a species of beetle of the family Scarabaeidae. It is found in South Africa (Western Cape).

== Description ==
Adults reach a length of about 6 mm (0.24 in). They are black and highly glossy, with only the front legs and antennae reddish-brown. The elytra are covered (but not very densely) with fine, light brown setae, while the scutellum, the margin of the propygidium and the abdomen have faint yellowish scales.
