= Heterochelus blandulus =

Scientific classification
- Kingdom: Animalia
- Phylum: Arthropoda
- Class: Insecta
- Order: Coleoptera
- Suborder: Polyphaga
- Infraorder: Scarabaeiformia
- Family: Scarabaeidae
- Genus: Heterochelus
- Species: H. blandulus

Binomial name
- Heterochelus blandulus Kulzer, 1960

Species of beetle

Heterochelus blandulus is a species of beetle of the family Scarabaeidae. It is found in Botswana and South Africa (North West).

== Description ==
Adults reach a length of about 6 mm (0.24 in). They are black, with the legs somewhat lighter, and the elytra light reddish-brown. The base of the pronotum, elytra, pygidium, propygidium and abdomen are densely covered with small, yellow, round scales. Furthermore, the pronotum and the entire underside (and partly also the legs) have long, white hairs.
