= Heterochelus defector =

Scientific classification
- Kingdom: Animalia
- Phylum: Arthropoda
- Class: Insecta
- Order: Coleoptera
- Suborder: Polyphaga
- Infraorder: Scarabaeiformia
- Family: Scarabaeidae
- Genus: Heterochelus
- Species: H. defector

Binomial name
- Heterochelus defector Péringuey, 1908

Synonyms
- Heterochelus defector felschei Andreae, 1933; Heterochelus defector schwarzei Andreae, 1933

Species of beetle

Heterochelus defector is a species of beetle of the family Scarabaeidae. It is found in South Africa (KwaZulu-Natal) and Lesotho.

== Description ==
Adults reach a length of about 7 mm (0.28 in). They are bronze-green with a rufescent tinge on the legs. The elytra are chestnut-red and the head and pronotum are clothed with a very thick, upright, squamose yellow pubescence. The scutellum is densely squamose. The elytra plainly are tri-sulcate on each side with the sulci filled with a band of contiguous scales, the raised intervals are deeply punctate. The propygidium has a narrow band of sub-orange yellow scales and the pygidium is dark brown and without scales from the base to the middle, then closely scaly to the apex. The sides of the abdomen are covered with sub-lanuginose scales.
