= Heterochelus simulator =

Scientific classification
- Kingdom: Animalia
- Phylum: Arthropoda
- Class: Insecta
- Order: Coleoptera
- Suborder: Polyphaga
- Infraorder: Scarabaeiformia
- Family: Scarabaeidae
- Genus: Heterochelus
- Species: H. simulator

Binomial name
- Heterochelus simulator Péringuey, 1908

Synonyms
- Heterochelus melanopygus Arrow, 1917

Species of beetle

Heterochelus simulator is a species of beetle of the family Scarabaeidae. It is found in South Africa (Eastern Cape).

== Description ==
Adults reach a length of about 5 mm (0.20 in). The head, pronotum and pectus are black, while the elytra, abdomen and legs are rufescent. The pronotum is distinctly scabrose all over, and clothed with a short, greyish pubescence, and in the groove some squamose greyish hairs. The scutellum is squamose and the elytra are very faintly costulate, covered with elongate squamulose whitish hairs not dense enough to hide the background. The propygidium and sides of the abdomen are squamose and white. The pygidium is closely squamose.
