= Heterochelus viridicollis =

Scientific classification
- Kingdom: Animalia
- Phylum: Arthropoda
- Class: Insecta
- Order: Coleoptera
- Suborder: Polyphaga
- Infraorder: Scarabaeiformia
- Family: Scarabaeidae
- Genus: Heterochelus
- Species: H. viridicollis

Binomial name
- Heterochelus viridicollis Blanchard, 1850

Species of beetle

Heterochelus viridicollis is a species of beetle of the family Scarabaeidae. It is found in South Africa (Western Cape).

== Description ==
Adults reach a length of about 5–7 mm (0.20–0.28 in). Males are bronze-black, the pronotum with a greenish tinge. The elytra are chestnut-red, and the scutellum, pygidium and abdomen are clothed with slightly flavescent scales. The pronotum is clothed with a short and not very dense flavescent pubescence, and without any trace of scales, while the elytra are clothed with very fine appressed pubescence. Females have the same colour as the males, but the elytra have on each side three or four bands of slightly flavescent appressed hairs which are denser on the rounded apical part.
