= Heterochelus citrinus =

Scientific classification
- Kingdom: Animalia
- Phylum: Arthropoda
- Class: Insecta
- Order: Coleoptera
- Suborder: Polyphaga
- Infraorder: Scarabaeiformia
- Family: Scarabaeidae
- Genus: Heterochelus
- Species: H. citrinus

Binomial name
- Heterochelus citrinus Burmeister, 1844

Species of beetle

Heterochelus citrinus is a species of beetle of the family Scarabaeidae. It is found in South Africa (Eastern Cape).

== Description ==
Adults reach a length of about 6.5 mm (0.26 in). The ground colour is dark brown. The elytra are densely covered, while the pronotum is more sparsely covered with round, brownish-yellow scales, and also with sparse, bristle-like, yellow hairs.
