= Heterochelus serripes =

Scientific classification
- Kingdom: Animalia
- Phylum: Arthropoda
- Clade: Pancrustacea
- Class: Insecta
- Order: Coleoptera
- Suborder: Polyphaga
- Infraorder: Scarabaeiformia
- Family: Scarabaeidae
- Genus: Heterochelus
- Species: H. serripes

Binomial name
- Heterochelus serripes Blanchard, 1850

Species of beetle

Heterochelus serripes is a species of beetle of the family Scarabaeidae. It is found in South Africa (Cape).

== Description ==
Adults reach a length of about 7 mm (0.28 in). They are totally red, the elytra covered with elongate, not very closely set, ashy scales, and with a fuscous patch on each side. The head and pronotum are pubescent, the latter with a few squamose hairs along the base. The propygidium, pygidium and abdomen have elongate scales.
