= Heterochelus subpilosus =

Scientific classification
- Kingdom: Animalia
- Phylum: Arthropoda
- Clade: Pancrustacea
- Class: Insecta
- Order: Coleoptera
- Suborder: Polyphaga
- Infraorder: Scarabaeiformia
- Family: Scarabaeidae
- Genus: Heterochelus
- Species: H. subpilosus

Binomial name
- Heterochelus subpilosus (Nonfried, 1891)

Synonyms
- Dichelus subpilosus Nonfried, 1891

Species of beetle

Heterochelus subpilosus is a species of beetle of the family Scarabaeidae. It is found in South Africa (Cape).

== Description ==
Adults reach a length of about 7 mm (0.28 in). They have an oblong, robust, brown, shining body, which is densely fulvo-pilose on the upper side. The under side is opaque and fuscous brown. The antennae are reddish. The pronotum is somewhat rounded, convex, black and shining, closely and roughly punctate and clothed with flavous hairs. The scutellum is covered with flavous hairs and the elytra are shining, brown, densely punctate and briefly setose. The setae are flavous. The pygidium and abdomen are completely covered with whitish scales.
