= Heterochelus optivus =

Scientific classification
- Kingdom: Animalia
- Phylum: Arthropoda
- Class: Insecta
- Order: Coleoptera
- Suborder: Polyphaga
- Infraorder: Scarabaeiformia
- Family: Scarabaeidae
- Genus: Heterochelus
- Species: H. optivus

Binomial name
- Heterochelus optivus Péringuey, 1902

Species of beetle

Heterochelus optivus is a species of beetle of the family Scarabaeidae. It is found in South Africa (Western Cape).

== Description ==
Adults reach a length of about 3.75 mm (0.148 in). They are black, with the scutellum, elytra, pygidium and sides of the abdomen covered with bright yellow scales. The anterior legs are rufescent. The head is strongly scabrose and the pronotum has a distinct longitudinal median impression reaching from the middle to the base, and having only a few squamose appressed yellow hairs which are greatly scattered. The scales on the scutellum, elytra, and pygidial part are very closely set.
