= Heterochelus formosus =

Scientific classification
- Kingdom: Animalia
- Phylum: Arthropoda
- Class: Insecta
- Order: Coleoptera
- Suborder: Polyphaga
- Infraorder: Scarabaeiformia
- Family: Scarabaeidae
- Genus: Heterochelus
- Species: H. formosus

Binomial name
- Heterochelus formosus Kulzer, 1960

Species of beetle

Heterochelus formosus is a species of beetle of the family Scarabaeidae. It is found in South Africa (Western Cape).

== Description ==
Adults reach a length of about 5–6 mm (0.20–0.24 in). They have a black head, while the pronotum and elytra are very dark brown, with small, round, yellow scales that cover half the base. The legs are reddish-brown.
