= Heterochelus humeralis =

Scientific classification
- Kingdom: Animalia
- Phylum: Arthropoda
- Class: Insecta
- Order: Coleoptera
- Suborder: Polyphaga
- Infraorder: Scarabaeiformia
- Family: Scarabaeidae
- Genus: Heterochelus
- Species: H. humeralis

Binomial name
- Heterochelus humeralis Kulzer, 1960

Species of beetle

Heterochelus humeralis is a species of beetle of the family Scarabaeidae. It is found in South Africa (Cape).

== Description ==
Adults reach a length of about 8 mm (0.31 in). The head, pronotum and underside are black, while the legs and elytra are dark brown, the latter densely covered with sulfur-yellow scales.
