= Heterochelus vittiferus =

Scientific classification
- Kingdom: Animalia
- Phylum: Arthropoda
- Clade: Pancrustacea
- Class: Insecta
- Order: Coleoptera
- Suborder: Polyphaga
- Infraorder: Scarabaeiformia
- Family: Scarabaeidae
- Genus: Heterochelus
- Species: H. vittiferus

Binomial name
- Heterochelus vittiferus Burmeister, 1844

Species of beetle

Heterochelus vittiferus is a species of beetle of the family Scarabaeidae. It is found in South Africa (Northern Cape).

== Description ==
Adults reach a length of about 4.5 mm (0.18 in). Males are black, the pronotum with five longitudinal bands of ashy grey squamose hairs and the elytra with two bands of scales of the same colour on each side. The pygidial part and abdomen are densely scaly. The head is pubescent and the pronotum is very rugose and the area that is not covered by the five sub-squamose bands is slightly pubescent. The scutellum is densely scaly and the elytra have two longitudinal impressions on each side, which are filled with the round, thick scales. Females are similar to males, but the scales are flavescent, the elytra each have three bands of scales, and in the apical part there is a distinct horizontal spine at a short distance from the sutural angle.
