= Heterochelus nubilus =

Scientific classification
- Kingdom: Animalia
- Phylum: Arthropoda
- Clade: Pancrustacea
- Class: Insecta
- Order: Coleoptera
- Suborder: Polyphaga
- Infraorder: Scarabaeiformia
- Family: Scarabaeidae
- Genus: Heterochelus
- Species: H. nubilus

Binomial name
- Heterochelus nubilus Burmeister, 1844

Species of beetle

Heterochelus nubilus is a species of beetle of the family Scarabaeidae. It is found in South Africa (Western Cape).

== Description ==
Adults reach a length of about 4–5 mm (0.16–0.20 in). Males are black, with two bands of white scales on the elytra and the scutellum, propygidium and abdomen clothed with dense greyish-white scales. The head and pronotum are scarcely pubescent, the latter with a deep, post-median groove occasionally filled with white scales, and with a lateral and anterior fringe of setose hairs. The elytra are sub-costate on each side of the disk, and have two longitudinal impressions, divided by the costule, filled with a band of small white round scales not very closely set. The outer band reaches to the median part only. The legs have a few setae, but are otherwise glabrous. Females are similar to males, but the elytra are covered with denser and more elongate flavescent scales, and the pygidium is clothed with yellowish scales.
