= Heterochelus karrooanus =

Scientific classification
- Kingdom: Animalia
- Phylum: Arthropoda
- Class: Insecta
- Order: Coleoptera
- Suborder: Polyphaga
- Infraorder: Scarabaeiformia
- Family: Scarabaeidae
- Genus: Heterochelus
- Species: H. karrooanus

Binomial name
- Heterochelus karrooanus Péringuey, 1908

Species of beetle

Heterochelus karrooanus is a species of beetle of the family Scarabaeidae. It is found in South Africa (Eastern Cape).

== Description ==
Adults reach a length of about 6.5–7 mm (0.26–0.28 in). Males are black, almost opaque, and very briefly pubescent on the upper side. The pronotum is very closely punctate, grooved longitudinally in the centre and has a narrow margin of yellow, small, ovate scales. The scutellum is scaly and the elytra are almost without any pubescence, they are broad at the base, short, non-costate and have on each side a juxta-sutural broad band of small ovate yellow scales reaching from the base to the apex, and a parallel dorsal one reaching from the base to the median part only. The propygidium has an apical transverse band of yellow scales and the pygidium is velvety black suffused at the apex with a few yellowish scales. Females are black like the males, but densely pubescent on the head and pronotum, underside and legs. On the elytra are two bands of yellow scales disposed as on the male, and the apical part of the pygidium is also suffused with flavescent scales.
