= Heterochelus jucundulus =

Scientific classification
- Kingdom: Animalia
- Phylum: Arthropoda
- Class: Insecta
- Order: Coleoptera
- Suborder: Polyphaga
- Infraorder: Scarabaeiformia
- Family: Scarabaeidae
- Genus: Heterochelus
- Species: H. jucundulus

Binomial name
- Heterochelus jucundulus Péringuey, 1908

Species of beetle

Heterochelus jucundulus is a species of beetle of the family Scarabaeidae. It is found in South Africa (Limpopo).

== Description ==
Adults reach a length of about 5–6.5 mm (0.20–0.26 in). Males are black with a faint metallic tinge, but also occasionally rufescent. The elytra and legs are red. The pronotum is covered with deep scabrose punctures, clothed with a very long erect pubescence, but having also a few appressed squamose hairs. The scutellum is covered with dense whitish flavescent scales. The elytra are moderately deeply bi-sulcate longitudinally on each side, the sulci filled with lanciform, not closely set whitish scales which are replaced on the sides by more hair-like appressed ones. The propygidium has a narrow band of yellowish scales and the pygidium is densely scaly. Females have the same colour and vestiture as males, but the scales on the elytra are more hair-like.
