= Heterochelus junodi =

Scientific classification
- Kingdom: Animalia
- Phylum: Arthropoda
- Class: Insecta
- Order: Coleoptera
- Suborder: Polyphaga
- Infraorder: Scarabaeiformia
- Family: Scarabaeidae
- Genus: Heterochelus
- Species: H. junodi

Binomial name
- Heterochelus junodi Kulzer, 1960

Species of beetle

Heterochelus junodi is a species of beetle of the family Scarabaeidae. It is found in South Africa (KwaZulu-Natal, Limpopo).

== Description ==
Adults reach a length of about 5–6 mm (0.20–0.24 in). The head is black, while the pronotum, elytra and abdomen are reddish-brown. The elytra have a sutural, discal and sometimes a lateral band of very sparse, hair-like white scales. Subspecies nigropygidialis has a completely black pygidium on a brown background.

== Subspecies ==
- Heterochelus junodi junodi (KwaZulu-Natal)
- Heterochelus junodi nigropygidialis Kulzer, 1960 (Limpopo)
