= Heterochelus natalensis =

Scientific classification
- Kingdom: Animalia
- Phylum: Arthropoda
- Class: Insecta
- Order: Coleoptera
- Suborder: Polyphaga
- Infraorder: Scarabaeiformia
- Family: Scarabaeidae
- Genus: Heterochelus
- Species: H. natalensis

Binomial name
- Heterochelus natalensis Péringuey, 1902

Species of beetle

Heterochelus natalensis is a species of beetle of the family Scarabaeidae. It is found in South Africa (KwaZulu-Natal).

== Description ==
Adults reach a length of about 6–6.5 mm (0.24–0.26 in). They are black, with a faint metallic tinge on the pronotum. The elytra are chestnut-brown, and have four bands of flavescent, round scales on each side. The scutellum is scaly and the pygidium is covered with a black, sub-velvety coating. The head and pronotum are covered with flavescent hairs, and the latter has a narrow band of not very dense appressed squamose hairs.
