= Heterochelus leoninus =

Scientific classification
- Kingdom: Animalia
- Phylum: Arthropoda
- Class: Insecta
- Order: Coleoptera
- Suborder: Polyphaga
- Infraorder: Scarabaeiformia
- Family: Scarabaeidae
- Genus: Heterochelus
- Species: H. leoninus

Binomial name
- Heterochelus leoninus Péringuey, 1902

Species of beetle

Heterochelus leoninus is a species of beetle of the family Scarabaeidae. It is found in South Africa (Western Cape).

== Description ==
Adults reach a length of about 6.25–6.5 mm (0.246–0.256 in). Males are black, with the elytra light fulvous and the legs reddish, but occasionally with the hind ones black. The head, pronotum and the whole under side are very densely villose, while the scutellum, propygidium, and abdomen are clothed with yellow scales. The pygidium is only scaly on the upper half and villose on the lower. The elytra have a band of yellow scales edging the suture on the posterior part, and extending along the apical margin. Females are similar to males, but the villose hairs on the upper and under side are whitish, the whole pygidial part is densely scaly and also villose.
