= Heterochelus comosus =

Scientific classification
- Kingdom: Animalia
- Phylum: Arthropoda
- Class: Insecta
- Order: Coleoptera
- Suborder: Polyphaga
- Infraorder: Scarabaeiformia
- Family: Scarabaeidae
- Genus: Heterochelus
- Species: H. comosus

Binomial name
- Heterochelus comosus Péringuey, 1902

Species of beetle

Heterochelus comosus is a species of beetle of the family Scarabaeidae. It is found in South Africa (Cape).

== Description ==
Adults reach a length of about 8 mm (0.31 in). They are black, with the elytra testaceous red, the hind legs reddish brown and the scutellum, pygidial part and abdomen, as well as the apical margin of the elytra, covered with yellow scales. These scales are somewhat lanuginose and resemble the hairs on the propygidium and abdomen.
