= Heterochelus lugens =

Scientific classification
- Kingdom: Animalia
- Phylum: Arthropoda
- Clade: Pancrustacea
- Class: Insecta
- Order: Coleoptera
- Suborder: Polyphaga
- Infraorder: Scarabaeiformia
- Family: Scarabaeidae
- Genus: Heterochelus
- Species: H. lugens

Binomial name
- Heterochelus lugens Burmeister, 1844

Species of beetle

Heterochelus lugens is a species of beetle of the family Scarabaeidae. It is found in the Western Cape province of South Africa.

== Description ==
Adults reach a length of about 5 mm (0.20 in). Males are black, with the elytra chestnut-brown or occasionally black. The head and pronotum are clothed with a short, erect, black pubescence, and the pronotum is deeply grooved from the base to a short distance from the apex. The scutellum is covered with yellow ovate scales. The elytra are closely punctured and have three more or less obliterated bands of ovate yellow scales on each side, intermingled with a very short, sub-appressed, blackish pubescence. The propygidium and abdomen are edged with yellow scales and thick squamose hairs. The pygidium is deeply punctured, with a small squamose hair in each puncture. The legs are reddish. Females are similar to males in colour, but the pronotum is more densely villose, and the hairs are lighter, the scales are replaced by squamose hairs which cover the scutellum and the pygidial area, and the elytra have only a sutural and a narrow outer marginal band of these hairs.
