= Heterochelus barkeri =

Scientific classification
- Kingdom: Animalia
- Phylum: Arthropoda
- Class: Insecta
- Order: Coleoptera
- Suborder: Polyphaga
- Infraorder: Scarabaeiformia
- Family: Scarabaeidae
- Genus: Heterochelus
- Species: H. barkeri

Binomial name
- Heterochelus barkeri Kulzer, 1960

Species of beetle

Heterochelus barkeri is a species of beetle of the family Scarabaeidae. It is found in South Africa (KwaZulu-Natal).

== Description ==
Adults reach a length of about 5 mm (0.20 in). The head is black, while the rest of the body is reddish-brown. The pronotum and elytra are densely covered with small, round, greyish-green or yellowish scales. Furthermore, each elytron has a white discal band and a sutural band.
