= Heterochelus parilis =

Scientific classification
- Kingdom: Animalia
- Phylum: Arthropoda
- Class: Insecta
- Order: Coleoptera
- Suborder: Polyphaga
- Infraorder: Scarabaeiformia
- Family: Scarabaeidae
- Genus: Heterochelus
- Species: H. parilis

Binomial name
- Heterochelus parilis Péringuey, 1902

Species of beetle

Heterochelus parilis is a species of beetle of the family Scarabaeidae. It is found in South Africa (Western Cape).

== Description ==
Adults reach a length of about 5–6 mm (0.20–0.24 in). They are black, with the anterior legs, and the antennae (with the exception of the club) reddish. The elytra have three dorsal bands of greyish scales reaching to the apex and a somewhat indistinct marginal one on each side. The pygidium is glabrous and shining. The head is clothed with a greyish pubescence and the pronotum is clothed with long, not very dense, greyish-black erect hairs interspersed with a few greyish scales which form a distinct basal band. The elytra are costate and have three intervals filled with small, round, greyish scales, which form also a band along the apex.
