= Heterochelus stuckenbergi =

Scientific classification
- Kingdom: Animalia
- Phylum: Arthropoda
- Class: Insecta
- Order: Coleoptera
- Suborder: Polyphaga
- Infraorder: Scarabaeiformia
- Family: Scarabaeidae
- Genus: Heterochelus
- Species: H. stuckenbergi

Binomial name
- Heterochelus stuckenbergi Kulzer, 1960

Species of beetle

Heterochelus stuckenbergi is a species of beetle of the family Scarabaeidae. It is found in South Africa (KwaZulu-Natal).

== Description ==
Adults reach a length of about 5.5–6 mm (0.22–0.24 in). The head, pronotum and underside are black, while the legs and elytra are reddish-brown, the latter with three scale bands each, as well as two ribs covered with darker scales.
