= Heterochelus maculatus =

Scientific classification
- Kingdom: Animalia
- Phylum: Arthropoda
- Class: Insecta
- Order: Coleoptera
- Suborder: Polyphaga
- Infraorder: Scarabaeiformia
- Family: Scarabaeidae
- Genus: Heterochelus
- Species: H. maculatus

Binomial name
- Heterochelus maculatus Kulzer, 1960

Species of beetle

Heterochelus maculatus is a species of beetle of the family Scarabaeidae. It is found in South Africa (Western Cape).

== Description ==
Adults reach a length of about 7–8 mm (0.28–0.31 in). The head and pronotum are black, while elytra, legs and abdomen are light reddish-brown. The elytra are densely covered with orange-yellow scales and have a black, wedge-shaped stripe, as well as a black transverse band of variable size.
