= Heterochelus rudebecki =

Scientific classification
- Kingdom: Animalia
- Phylum: Arthropoda
- Class: Insecta
- Order: Coleoptera
- Suborder: Polyphaga
- Infraorder: Scarabaeiformia
- Family: Scarabaeidae
- Genus: Heterochelus
- Species: H. rudebecki

Binomial name
- Heterochelus rudebecki Kulzer, 1960

Species of beetle

Heterochelus rudebecki is a species of beetle of the family Scarabaeidae. It is found in South Africa (KwaZulu-Natal).

== Description ==
Adults reach a length of about 6–7 mm (0.24–0.28 in). The head, pronotum, abdomen and legs are black and the elytra are brown to almost black. A sutural stripe is very sparsely covered with long, white hair-scales and sometimes, a similar discal stripe is present. The rest of the surface is very sparsely covered with long, white hairs.
