= Heterochelus senilis =

Scientific classification
- Kingdom: Animalia
- Phylum: Arthropoda
- Class: Insecta
- Order: Coleoptera
- Suborder: Polyphaga
- Infraorder: Scarabaeiformia
- Family: Scarabaeidae
- Genus: Heterochelus
- Species: H. senilis

Binomial name
- Heterochelus senilis Péringuey, 1902

Species of beetle

Heterochelus senilis is a species of beetle of the family Scarabaeidae. It is found in South Africa (Eastern Cape, Western Cape).

== Description ==
Adults reach a length of about 5–5.25 mm (0.197–0.207 in). Males are black, with the elytra light testaceous but infuscate laterally. The scutellum, apical margin of the elytra, pygidial part and abdomen are clothed with yellowish scales, and the under side is densely pubescent. The pronotum is clothed with a long greyish pubescence, and has a few appressed hairs of the same colour along the base. Females are similar to the males, but the legs are reddish, and the scales on the elytra occur along the apical margin only.
