= Heterochelus albosetosus =

Scientific classification
- Kingdom: Animalia
- Phylum: Arthropoda
- Class: Insecta
- Order: Coleoptera
- Suborder: Polyphaga
- Infraorder: Scarabaeiformia
- Family: Scarabaeidae
- Genus: Heterochelus
- Species: H. albosetosus

Binomial name
- Heterochelus albosetosus Kulzer, 1960

Species of beetle

Heterochelus albosetosus is a species of beetle of the family Scarabaeidae. It is found in South Africa (Northern Cape).

== Description ==
Adults reach a length of about 4–4.5 mm (0.16–0.18 in). The head, pronotum, abdomen and hind legs are black, while the front legs are reddish-brown. The elytra are brown, but darkened at the rear, and with only a few yellow scales at the tip. The rest is sparsely covered with brown hairs.
