= Heterochelus capicola =

Scientific classification
- Kingdom: Animalia
- Phylum: Arthropoda
- Clade: Pancrustacea
- Class: Insecta
- Order: Coleoptera
- Suborder: Polyphaga
- Infraorder: Scarabaeiformia
- Family: Scarabaeidae
- Genus: Heterochelus
- Species: H. capicola

Binomial name
- Heterochelus capicola (Fabricius, 1781)

Synonyms
- Melolontha capicola Fabricius, 1781

Species of beetle

Heterochelus capicola is a species of beetle of the family Scarabaeidae. It is found in South Africa (Northern Cape).

== Description ==
Adults reach a length of about 6–6.5 mm (0.24–0.26 in). Males are black, with the elytra chocolate-brown. The scutellum, abdomen, and propygidium are clothed with dense flavescent scales. The pygidium is also scaly but has a triangular tomentose patch without scales in the median part of the base. The elytra are covered with dense appressed greyish hairs.
