= Heterochelus coccineus =

Scientific classification
- Kingdom: Animalia
- Phylum: Arthropoda
- Class: Insecta
- Order: Coleoptera
- Suborder: Polyphaga
- Infraorder: Scarabaeiformia
- Family: Scarabaeidae
- Genus: Heterochelus
- Species: H. coccineus

Binomial name
- Heterochelus coccineus Burmeister, 1844

Species of beetle

Heterochelus coccineus is a species of beetle of the family Scarabaeidae. It is found in South Africa (Eastern Cape).

== Description ==
Adults reach a length of about 4–6 mm (0.16–0.24 in). Males are black, with the scutellum, the elytra, the pygidium and the sides of the abdomen clothed with orange scales. The head and pronotum are clothed with a not dense but somewhat long, greyish pubescence, but in the deep basal longitudinal groove of the pronotum there are a few orange scales. Females are black, with the elytra chestnut-brown, and covered with sub-appressed, flavescent hairs, but having only a few yellowish scales along the apical edge as well as on the scutellum.
