= Heterochelus omissus =

Scientific classification
- Kingdom: Animalia
- Phylum: Arthropoda
- Class: Insecta
- Order: Coleoptera
- Suborder: Polyphaga
- Infraorder: Scarabaeiformia
- Family: Scarabaeidae
- Genus: Heterochelus
- Species: H. omissus

Binomial name
- Heterochelus omissus Kulzer, 1960

Species of beetle

Heterochelus omissus is a species of beetle of the family Scarabaeidae. It is found in South Africa (Western Cape).

== Description ==
Adults reach a length of about 5.5 mm (0.22 in). They are black, with the legs and elytra reddish-brown, the latter with three stripes of yellow, scales. The spaces between these are covered with brown scales.
