= Heterochelus baini =

Scientific classification
- Kingdom: Animalia
- Phylum: Arthropoda
- Class: Insecta
- Order: Coleoptera
- Suborder: Polyphaga
- Infraorder: Scarabaeiformia
- Family: Scarabaeidae
- Genus: Heterochelus
- Species: H. baini

Binomial name
- Heterochelus baini Kulzer, 1960

Species of beetle

Heterochelus baini is a species of beetle of the family Scarabaeidae. It is found in South Africa (Western Cape).

== Description ==
Adults reach a length of about 4 mm (0.16 in). They have a short body, with very long hind legs. They are black and shiny, with the two frontal pairs of legs, as well as the antennae dark brown. The elytra have a row of white scales at the suture and sometimes a row with a few scales on the disk.
