= Heterochelus similis =

Scientific classification
- Kingdom: Animalia
- Phylum: Arthropoda
- Class: Insecta
- Order: Coleoptera
- Suborder: Polyphaga
- Infraorder: Scarabaeiformia
- Family: Scarabaeidae
- Genus: Heterochelus
- Species: H. similis

Binomial name
- Heterochelus similis Kulzer, 1960

Species of beetle

Heterochelus similis is a species of beetle of the family Scarabaeidae. It is found in South Africa (Western Cape).

== Description ==
Adults reach a length of about 6 mm (0.24 in). They have an elongate body, with only the front legs and antennae reddish-brown. The suture of the elytra consists of white, elongated scales and a short discal band, as well as similar scales scattered over the entire surface.
