= Heterochelus vulpecula =

Scientific classification
- Kingdom: Animalia
- Phylum: Arthropoda
- Class: Insecta
- Order: Coleoptera
- Suborder: Polyphaga
- Infraorder: Scarabaeiformia
- Family: Scarabaeidae
- Genus: Heterochelus
- Species: H. vulpecula

Binomial name
- Heterochelus vulpecula Burmeister, 1844

Species of beetle

Heterochelus vulpecula is a species of beetle of the family Scarabaeidae. It is found in South Africa (Eastern Cape).

== Description ==
Adults reach a length of about 5 mm (0.20 in). They are black, with the elytra and legs reddish. The head and pronotum are covered with a short flavescent pubescence and small yellow scales, and the scutellum and elytra are also covered with contiguous yellow scales. The propygidium, the whole of the pygidium and the sides of the abdomen are covered with yellow scales.
