= Heterochelus miserabilis =

Scientific classification
- Kingdom: Animalia
- Phylum: Arthropoda
- Class: Insecta
- Order: Coleoptera
- Suborder: Polyphaga
- Infraorder: Scarabaeiformia
- Family: Scarabaeidae
- Genus: Heterochelus
- Species: H. miserabilis

Binomial name
- Heterochelus miserabilis Blanchard, 1850

Species of beetle

Heterochelus miserabilis is a species of beetle of the family Scarabaeidae. It is found in South Africa (Western Cape).

== Description ==
Adults reach a length of about 5–6 mm (0.20–0.24 in). The head and pronotum are black, while the abdomen, legs, and elytra are reddish-brown. The latter is sparsely covered with scattered yellow scales. These scales are sometimes are arranged in rows. The rest is dark and finely pubescent. In subspecies obscurus, the elytra and legs are also black and the elytra only have a few yellow scales at the tip, while the rest is quite densely covered with dark and fine hairs.

== Subspecies ==
- Heterochelus miserabilis miserabilis (Western Cape)
- Heterochelus miserabilis obscurus Kulzer, 1960 (Western Cape)
