= Heterochelus festivus =

Scientific classification
- Kingdom: Animalia
- Phylum: Arthropoda
- Class: Insecta
- Order: Coleoptera
- Suborder: Polyphaga
- Infraorder: Scarabaeiformia
- Family: Scarabaeidae
- Genus: Heterochelus
- Species: H. festivus

Binomial name
- Heterochelus festivus Kulzer, 1960

Species of beetle

Heterochelus festivus is a species of beetle of the family Scarabaeidae. It is found in South Africa (Western Cape).

== Description ==
Adults reach a length of about 4.5 mm (0.18 in). They are black, with dark brown legs. The antennae are light brown, with a black club. The elytra have three broad, pale yellow bands of scales. The ribs are narrow and covered with dark, erect scales.
