= Heterochelus pygidialis =

Scientific classification
- Kingdom: Animalia
- Phylum: Arthropoda
- Class: Insecta
- Order: Coleoptera
- Suborder: Polyphaga
- Infraorder: Scarabaeiformia
- Family: Scarabaeidae
- Genus: Heterochelus
- Species: H. pygidialis

Binomial name
- Heterochelus pygidialis Péringuey, 1902

Species of beetle

Heterochelus pygidialis is a species of beetle of the family Scarabaeidae. It is found in South Africa (Eastern Cape).

== Description ==
Adults reach a length of about 5.25–5.5 mm (0.207–0.217 in). They are black, with the elytra light chocolate-brown, and sprinkled on the upper side with small, elongate whitish grey scales. On the underside, the whole of the abdomen and the pectus are covered with contiguous longer scales, the edge of the propygidium has a very narrow band of similar scales, but the pygidium is quite smooth and impunctate. The anterior and lateral margins of the pronotum have a fringe of greyish not dense setae.
