= Heterochelus vansoni =

Scientific classification
- Kingdom: Animalia
- Phylum: Arthropoda
- Class: Insecta
- Order: Coleoptera
- Suborder: Polyphaga
- Infraorder: Scarabaeiformia
- Family: Scarabaeidae
- Genus: Heterochelus
- Species: H. vansoni

Binomial name
- Heterochelus vansoni Kulzer, 1960

Species of beetle

Heterochelus vansoni is a species of beetle of the family Scarabaeidae. It is found in South Africa (Eastern Cape).

== Description ==
Adults reach a length of about 7–8 mm (0.28–0.31 in). The head and abdomen are black, while the legs, antennae, pronotum and elytra are reddish-brown. The latter is densely covered with yellow scales and there is a large, black spot that reaches the lateral margin in most specimens.
