= Heterochelus pseudopygidialis =

Scientific classification
- Kingdom: Animalia
- Phylum: Arthropoda
- Class: Insecta
- Order: Coleoptera
- Suborder: Polyphaga
- Infraorder: Scarabaeiformia
- Family: Scarabaeidae
- Genus: Heterochelus
- Species: H. pseudopygidialis

Binomial name
- Heterochelus pseudopygidialis Kulzer, 1960

Species of beetle

Heterochelus pseudopygidialis is a species of beetle of the family Scarabaeidae. It is found in South Africa (Cape).

== Description ==
Adults reach a length of about 6.5 mm (0.26 in). They are black, with the legs and antennae dark brown. The elytra are covered with small, light grey, scales, but half of the base is without scales.
