= Heterochelus namibensis =

Scientific classification
- Kingdom: Animalia
- Phylum: Arthropoda
- Class: Insecta
- Order: Coleoptera
- Suborder: Polyphaga
- Infraorder: Scarabaeiformia
- Family: Scarabaeidae
- Genus: Heterochelus
- Species: H. namibensis

Binomial name
- Heterochelus namibensis Kulzer, 1960

Species of beetle

Heterochelus namibensis is a species of beetle of the family Scarabaeidae. It is found in Namibia.

== Description ==
Adults reach a length of about 5–6 mm (0.20–0.24 in). The head, pronotum, underside and front legs are black, while the elytra and the other legs are dark reddish-brown. The elytra are shiny and have a white, wedge-shaped patch of scales behind the middle near the suture, with black scales in the middle.
