= Heterochelus inornatus =

Scientific classification
- Kingdom: Animalia
- Phylum: Arthropoda
- Class: Insecta
- Order: Coleoptera
- Suborder: Polyphaga
- Infraorder: Scarabaeiformia
- Family: Scarabaeidae
- Genus: Heterochelus
- Species: H. inornatus

Binomial name
- Heterochelus inornatus Péringuey, 1902

Species of beetle

Heterochelus inornatus is a species of beetle of the family Scarabaeidae. It is found in South Africa (Northern Cape).

== Description ==
Adults reach a length of about 5–6.5 mm (0.20–0.26 in). They are black, with the elytra light testaceous and the legs reddish. The scutellum, apical margin of the elytra, pygidial part and abdomen are clothed with dense yellow scales intermixed along the edge of the propygidium and the abdomen with white scales forming there a narrow band or line.
