= Heterochelus latus =

Scientific classification
- Kingdom: Animalia
- Phylum: Arthropoda
- Class: Insecta
- Order: Coleoptera
- Suborder: Polyphaga
- Infraorder: Scarabaeiformia
- Family: Scarabaeidae
- Genus: Heterochelus
- Species: H. latus

Binomial name
- Heterochelus latus Kulzer, 1960

Species of beetle

Heterochelus latus is a species of beetle of the family Scarabaeidae. It is found in South Africa (Western Cape).

== Description ==
Adults reach a length of about 5 mm (0.20 in). They are short and broad, with the head, pronotum and abdomen black, and the elytra and legs reddish-brown.
