= Heterochelus gifensis =

Scientific classification
- Kingdom: Animalia
- Phylum: Arthropoda
- Class: Insecta
- Order: Coleoptera
- Suborder: Polyphaga
- Infraorder: Scarabaeiformia
- Family: Scarabaeidae
- Genus: Heterochelus
- Species: H. gifensis

Binomial name
- Heterochelus gifensis Kulzer, 1960

Species of beetle

Heterochelus gifensis is a species of beetle of the family Scarabaeidae. It is found in South Africa (Western Cape).

== Description ==
Adults reach a length of about 4.5 mm (0.18 in). They are black, with the elytra dark brown and the front legs and antennae somewhat lighter. Part of the pronotum and elytra have individual scales, while the scutellum, pygidium, propygidium and abdomen are covered with dense yellow scales. The elytra is also sparsely covered with brown hairs.
