= Heterochelus egenus =

Scientific classification
- Kingdom: Animalia
- Phylum: Arthropoda
- Class: Insecta
- Order: Coleoptera
- Suborder: Polyphaga
- Infraorder: Scarabaeiformia
- Family: Scarabaeidae
- Genus: Heterochelus
- Species: H. egenus

Binomial name
- Heterochelus egenus Péringuey, 1902

Species of beetle

Heterochelus egenus is a species of beetle of the family Scarabaeidae. It is found in South Africa (KwaZulu-Natal).

== Description ==
Adults reach a length of about 4.75 mm (0.187 in). Males are reddish brown, with the head dark fuscous, and completely clothed with elongate, somewhat hair-like flavescent scales which are as numerous on the pronotum as on the elytra or the pygidium. Females are similar to males, but the pronotum is more pubescent, and the scales on the elytra and pygidium are more like sub-squamose hairs and are not so dense.
