= Heterochelus amabilis =

Scientific classification
- Kingdom: Animalia
- Phylum: Arthropoda
- Class: Insecta
- Order: Coleoptera
- Suborder: Polyphaga
- Infraorder: Scarabaeiformia
- Family: Scarabaeidae
- Genus: Heterochelus
- Species: H. amabilis

Binomial name
- Heterochelus amabilis Kulzer, 1960

Species of beetle

Heterochelus amabilis is a species of beetle of the family Scarabaeidae. It is found in South Africa (Western Cape).

== Description ==
Adults reach a length of about 5.5–6 mm (0.22–0.24 in). The head, pronotum and abdomen are black, while the legs, antennae and elytra are reddish-brown, the latter slightly darkened at the sides and at the rear, and with white, oval scales at the suture and apex.
