= Heterochelus subvittatus =

Scientific classification
- Kingdom: Animalia
- Phylum: Arthropoda
- Class: Insecta
- Order: Coleoptera
- Suborder: Polyphaga
- Infraorder: Scarabaeiformia
- Family: Scarabaeidae
- Genus: Heterochelus
- Species: H. subvittatus

Binomial name
- Heterochelus subvittatus Burmeister, 1844

Species of beetle

Heterochelus subvittatus is a species of beetle of the family Scarabaeidae. It is found in South Africa (Cape).

== Description ==
Adults reach a length of about 4.5–5 mm (0.18–0.20 in). Males are black, with the pronotum clothed with squamose hairs turning to yellow scales in the posterior part, and in the basal, longitudinal groove. The elytra are covered with closely set round yellow scales which are paler along the suture and between the first and second slightly raised costae. The pygidium is covered with yellow scales, and also has two longitudinal orange bands. The legs are reddish. Females have three not very well-defined bands of hairs on the elytra, with paler elongate scales on each side. The scales of the pygidium are as in males.
