= Heterochelus alienus =

Scientific classification
- Kingdom: Animalia
- Phylum: Arthropoda
- Class: Insecta
- Order: Coleoptera
- Suborder: Polyphaga
- Infraorder: Scarabaeiformia
- Family: Scarabaeidae
- Genus: Heterochelus
- Species: H. alienus

Binomial name
- Heterochelus alienus Kulzer, 1960

Species of beetle

Heterochelus alienus is a species of beetle of the family Scarabaeidae. It is found in South Africa (KwaZulu-Natal).

== Description ==
Adults reach a length of about 7–8 mm (0.28–0.31 in). The head, pronotum and underside are black, while the legs and elytra are reddish-brown. The upper surface has a dull silky sheen and is without scales, except for the scutellum.
