= Heterochelus senex =

Scientific classification
- Kingdom: Animalia
- Phylum: Arthropoda
- Clade: Pancrustacea
- Class: Insecta
- Order: Coleoptera
- Suborder: Polyphaga
- Infraorder: Scarabaeiformia
- Family: Scarabaeidae
- Genus: Heterochelus
- Species: H. senex

Binomial name
- Heterochelus senex Burmeister, 1844

Species of beetle

Heterochelus senex is a species of beetle of the family Scarabaeidae. It is found in South Africa (Northern Cape).

== Description ==
Adults reach a length of about 8 mm (0.31 in). They are black, with the elytra light brown. The pronotum is covered with shaggy hairs and the pygidium and abdomen are covered with white scales.
