= Heterochelus bimaculatus =

Scientific classification
- Kingdom: Animalia
- Phylum: Arthropoda
- Class: Insecta
- Order: Coleoptera
- Suborder: Polyphaga
- Infraorder: Scarabaeiformia
- Family: Scarabaeidae
- Genus: Heterochelus
- Species: H. bimaculatus

Binomial name
- Heterochelus bimaculatus Burmeister, 1844

Species of beetle

Heterochelus bimaculatus is a species of beetle of the family Scarabaeidae. It is found in South Africa (Cape).

== Description ==
Adults reach a length of about 5.5 mm (0.22 in). They are black, with the elytra clothed with yellow scales but having on each side of the posterior part an oblique, elongate, sub-parallel black or dark brown patch. The legs are reddish brown. The pronotum is covered with lanciform yellow scales moderately dense but looking more like strongly squamiform hairs. The scutellum is densely scaly and the scales on the elytra are small and very dense. There is also a brown patch. The propygidium and sides of the abdomen have yellow scales, but the pygidium is piceous red, and not scaly.
