= Heterochelus freyi =

Scientific classification
- Kingdom: Animalia
- Phylum: Arthropoda
- Class: Insecta
- Order: Coleoptera
- Suborder: Polyphaga
- Infraorder: Scarabaeiformia
- Family: Scarabaeidae
- Genus: Heterochelus
- Species: H. freyi

Binomial name
- Heterochelus freyi Kulzer, 1960

Species of beetle

Heterochelus freyi is a species of beetle of the family Scarabaeidae. It is found in South Africa (KwaZulu-Natal).

== Description ==
Adults reach a length of about 4.5–5 mm (0.18–0.20 in). They are completely black, although the antennae are sometimes dark brown. The entire upper surface is without scales.
