= Heterochelus nudus =

Scientific classification
- Kingdom: Animalia
- Phylum: Arthropoda
- Class: Insecta
- Order: Coleoptera
- Suborder: Polyphaga
- Infraorder: Scarabaeiformia
- Family: Scarabaeidae
- Genus: Heterochelus
- Species: H. nudus

Binomial name
- Heterochelus nudus Kulzer, 1960

Species of beetle

Heterochelus nudus is a species of beetle of the family Scarabaeidae. It is found in South Africa (Northern Cape).

== Description ==
Adults reach a length of about 6–7 mm (0.24–0.28 in). They are completely black, almost glabrous and highly glossy. The front legs are sometimes dark brown.
