= Heterochelus connatus =

Scientific classification
- Kingdom: Animalia
- Phylum: Arthropoda
- Clade: Pancrustacea
- Class: Insecta
- Order: Coleoptera
- Suborder: Polyphaga
- Infraorder: Scarabaeiformia
- Family: Scarabaeidae
- Genus: Heterochelus
- Species: H. connatus

Binomial name
- Heterochelus connatus Burmeister, 1844

Species of beetle

Heterochelus connatus is a species of beetle of the family Scarabaeidae. It is found in South Africa (Western Cape).

== Description ==
Adults reach a length of about 6–7 mm (0.24–0.28 in). They are black, with the elytra light testaceous and infuscate laterally. The scutellum, apical margin of the elytra, pygidial part and abdomen are clothed with thick flavescent scales. The head and pronotum are covered with very dense sub-flavescent hairs. The elytra are clothed with appressed not very closely set slightly flavescent hairs. The pectus, abdomen, and legs are villose, the latter are red.
