= Heterochelus diversus =

Scientific classification
- Kingdom: Animalia
- Phylum: Arthropoda
- Class: Insecta
- Order: Coleoptera
- Suborder: Polyphaga
- Infraorder: Scarabaeiformia
- Family: Scarabaeidae
- Genus: Heterochelus
- Species: H. diversus

Binomial name
- Heterochelus diversus Kulzer, 1960

Species of beetle

Heterochelus diversus is a species of beetle of the family Scarabaeidae. It is found in South Africa (Western Cape).

== Description ==
Adults reach a length of about 4–4.5 mm (0.16–0.18 in). They are black, with the front legs and antennae reddish-brown. The elytra have a suture which extends to the end and a discal band shortened at the rear, consisting of whitish, long, pointed scales. The spaces between the scales are covered with dark hair-like scales.
