= Heterochelus sobrinus =

Scientific classification
- Kingdom: Animalia
- Phylum: Arthropoda
- Class: Insecta
- Order: Coleoptera
- Suborder: Polyphaga
- Infraorder: Scarabaeiformia
- Family: Scarabaeidae
- Genus: Heterochelus
- Species: H. sobrinus

Binomial name
- Heterochelus sobrinus Burmeister, 1844

Synonyms
- Heterochelus inops Péringuey, 1902

Species of beetle

Heterochelus sobrinus is a species of beetle of the family Scarabaeidae. It is found in South Africa (Eastern Cape).

== Description ==
Adults reach a length of about 3–4 mm (0.12–0.16 in). Males are black, with the elytra, the pygidium and the sides of the abdomen clothed with pale, sub-flavescent scales. The legs are red. The pronotum is clothed with a few squamulose hairs and a few scales in the posterior part and the scutellum is covered with scales which are similar to those covering the elytra. Females are black, with the elytra dark chestnut-brown or testaceous red, and clothed with appressed, not so dense hairs. There is a narrow band of flavescent scales at the apex and the pygidium is densely scaly.
