= Heterochelus ochraceus =

Scientific classification
- Kingdom: Animalia
- Phylum: Arthropoda
- Clade: Pancrustacea
- Class: Insecta
- Order: Coleoptera
- Suborder: Polyphaga
- Infraorder: Scarabaeiformia
- Family: Scarabaeidae
- Genus: Heterochelus
- Species: H. ochraceus

Binomial name
- Heterochelus ochraceus Burmeister, 1844

Synonyms
- Heterochelus venustus Péringuey, 1902

Species of beetle

Heterochelus ochraceus is a species of beetle of the family Scarabaeidae. It is found in South Africa (Eastern Cape).

== Description ==
Adults reach a length of about 5.5–5.75 mm (0.217–0.226 in). They are black, but entirely covered on the upper side. The pygidium and abdomen with minute bright yellow scales forming a nearly non-interrupted coating. The legs are reddish. The head is hairy and the pronotum is fringed along the anterior and lateral margins with long, flavescent setae, and distinctly grooved longitudinally in the centre.
