= Heterochelus bidentatus =

Scientific classification
- Kingdom: Animalia
- Phylum: Arthropoda
- Class: Insecta
- Order: Coleoptera
- Suborder: Polyphaga
- Infraorder: Scarabaeiformia
- Family: Scarabaeidae
- Genus: Heterochelus
- Species: H. bidentatus

Binomial name
- Heterochelus bidentatus Burmeister, 1844

Species of beetle

Heterochelus bidentatus is a species of beetle of the family Scarabaeidae. It is found in South Africa (Cape).

== Description ==
Adults reach a length of about 6 mm (0.24 in). The head, pronotum and abdomen are black, while the legs and elytra are dark brown, the latter not very densely covered with small, somewhat pointed, yellowish-brown scales.
