= Heterochelus pavidus =

Scientific classification
- Kingdom: Animalia
- Phylum: Arthropoda
- Class: Insecta
- Order: Coleoptera
- Suborder: Polyphaga
- Infraorder: Scarabaeiformia
- Family: Scarabaeidae
- Genus: Heterochelus
- Species: H. pavidus

Binomial name
- Heterochelus pavidus Péringuey, 1908

Species of beetle

Heterochelus pavidus is a species of beetle of the family Scarabaeidae. It is found in South Africa (Gauteng).

== Description ==
Adults reach a length of about 4.5–6 mm (0.18–0.24 in). Males are dark greenish bronze with the elytra and legs chestnut-brown or reddish. The pronotum is strongly scabrose and clothed with a long, fine, greyish or sub-flavescent upright pubescence. The scutellum is closely scaly and the elytra are deeply sulcate, the sulci filled with greyish-flavescent or flavescent closely set scales. The propygidium has a narrow band of flavous scales and the pygidium is covered with a velvety black-brown tomentum reaching from the base to two-thirds of the length, and then to the apex with closely set, small yellow scales. Females differ from males in the less dense rows of more hair-like scales on the elytra, and the pygidium bears two basal brown velvety patches.
