= Heterochelus swierstrai =

Scientific classification
- Kingdom: Animalia
- Phylum: Arthropoda
- Class: Insecta
- Order: Coleoptera
- Suborder: Polyphaga
- Infraorder: Scarabaeiformia
- Family: Scarabaeidae
- Genus: Heterochelus
- Species: H. swierstrai

Binomial name
- Heterochelus swierstrai Kulzer, 1960

Species of beetle

Heterochelus swierstrai is a species of beetle of the family Scarabaeidae. It is found in South Africa (Transvaal).

== Description ==
Adults reach a length of about 4.5–5.5 mm (0.18–0.22 in). They are black or sometimes very dark brown. The front legs are sometimes reddish-brown. The elytra each have two ribs and three scale bands, consisting of yellowish scales. The ribs are sparsely covered with dark scale-like hairs.
