= Heterochelus tridens =

Scientific classification
- Kingdom: Animalia
- Phylum: Arthropoda
- Class: Insecta
- Order: Coleoptera
- Suborder: Polyphaga
- Infraorder: Scarabaeiformia
- Family: Scarabaeidae
- Genus: Heterochelus
- Species: H. tridens

Binomial name
- Heterochelus tridens Kulzer, 1960

Species of beetle

Heterochelus tridens is a species of beetle of the family Scarabaeidae. It is found in South Africa (Western Cape).

== Description ==
Adults reach a length of about 6–7 mm (0.24–0.28 in). The head and pronotum are black, while the legs, abdomen and elytra are very dark brown, the latter covered with light grey scales and dark setae arranged in rows. There is usually a black patch of scales behind the middle of the elytra.
