= Heterochelus turneri =

Scientific classification
- Kingdom: Animalia
- Phylum: Arthropoda
- Class: Insecta
- Order: Coleoptera
- Suborder: Polyphaga
- Infraorder: Scarabaeiformia
- Family: Scarabaeidae
- Genus: Heterochelus
- Species: H. turneri

Binomial name
- Heterochelus turneri Kulzer, 1960

Species of beetle

Heterochelus turneri is a species of beetle of the family Scarabaeidae. It is found in South Africa (Western Cape).

== Description ==
Adults reach a length of about 8–9 mm (0.31–0.35 in). They are black, with the elytra brown and densely covered with black, very small tomentose scales and with four rows of sparse, black setae. The hind legs are partly reddish-brown.
