= Heterochelus ditus =

Scientific classification
- Kingdom: Animalia
- Phylum: Arthropoda
- Class: Insecta
- Order: Coleoptera
- Suborder: Polyphaga
- Infraorder: Scarabaeiformia
- Family: Scarabaeidae
- Genus: Heterochelus
- Species: H. ditus

Binomial name
- Heterochelus ditus Péringuey, 1902

Species of beetle

Heterochelus ditus is a species of beetle of the family Scarabaeidae. It is found in South Africa (Western Cape).

== Description ==
Adults reach a length of about 7–9 mm (0.28–0.35 in). Males are black, with the elytra ochraceous and completely covered with very dense and closely set, appressed, short squamose ochraceous hairs. The scutellum, pygidial part and abdomen are clothed with light yellow scales. The head and pronotum are densely villose, with the hairs yellow. The pronotum has a short basal furrow filled with appressed hairs which also form a band along the whole margin. The elytra are elongate and bi-costate on each side. Females are similar to males. The elytra are also clothed with ochraceous appressed hairs, but they each have three bands of greyish hairs reaching from the base to the apex. Furthermore, there are two apical patches of lighter scales on the pygidium.
