= Heterochelus freudei =

Scientific classification
- Kingdom: Animalia
- Phylum: Arthropoda
- Class: Insecta
- Order: Coleoptera
- Suborder: Polyphaga
- Infraorder: Scarabaeiformia
- Family: Scarabaeidae
- Genus: Heterochelus
- Species: H. freudei

Binomial name
- Heterochelus freudei Kulzer, 1960

Species of beetle

Heterochelus freudei is a species of beetle of the family Scarabaeidae. It is found in Eswatini.

== Description ==
Adults reach a length of about 6 mm (0.24 in). The head and underside are black, the hind legs almost black, and the front legs, pronotum and elytra light reddish-brown. The elytra are entirely without scales, but have some short light hairs.
