= Heterochelus =

Scientific classification
- Kingdom: Animalia
- Phylum: Arthropoda
- Class: Insecta
- Order: Coleoptera
- Suborder: Polyphaga
- Infraorder: Scarabaeiformia
- Family: Scarabaeidae
- Subfamily: Melolonthinae
- Tribe: Hopliini
- Genus: Heterochelus; Burmeister, 1844

Synonyms
- Ischnochelus Burmeister, 1844

Genus beetles

Heterochelus is a genus of beetles belonging to the family Scarabaeidae.

== Species ==
- Heterochelus adspersus Péringuey, 1902
- Heterochelus albosetosus Kulzer, 1960
- Heterochelus alienus Kulzer, 1960
- Heterochelus amabilis Kulzer, 1960
- Heterochelus analis Burmeister, 1844
- Heterochelus anomalus Burmeister, 1844
- Heterochelus armatus Burmeister, 1844
- Heterochelus armipes (Boheman, 1857)
- Heterochelus arthriticus (Fabricius, 1781)
- Heterochelus aurantiacus (Billberg, 1820)
- Heterochelus auricollis Burmeister, 1855
- Heterochelus baini Kulzer, 1960
- Heterochelus barkeri Kulzer, 1960
- Heterochelus bicolor Dombrow, 2001
- Heterochelus bidentatus Burmeister, 1844
- Heterochelus bimaculatus Burmeister, 1844
- Heterochelus bimucronatus Kulzer, 1960
- Heterochelus binotatus (Thunberg, 1818)
- Heterochelus bisignatus Blanchard, 1850
- Heterochelus bivittatus Burmeister, 1844
- Heterochelus blandulus Kulzer, 1960
- Heterochelus braunsi Kulzer, 1960
- Heterochelus brincki Kulzer, 1960
- Heterochelus burmeisteri Dalla Torre, 1913
- Heterochelus capicola (Fabricius, 1781)
- Heterochelus carus Kulzer, 1960
- Heterochelus centralis Schein, 1959
- Heterochelus chiragricus (Thunberg, 1818)
- Heterochelus citrinus Burmeister, 1844
- Heterochelus coccineus Burmeister, 1844
- Heterochelus comosus Péringuey, 1902
- Heterochelus concinnus Péringuey, 1902
- Heterochelus connatus Burmeister, 1844
- Heterochelus consanguineus Péringuey, 1902
- Heterochelus consors Péringuey, 1902
- Heterochelus controversus Péringuey, 1902
- Heterochelus cristaticeps Péringuey, 1908
- Heterochelus croceipennis (Fairmaire, 1887)
- Heterochelus defector Péringuey, 1908
- Heterochelus delkeskampi Kulzer, 1960
- Heterochelus denticeps (Wiedemann, 1821)
- Heterochelus detritus Burmeister, 1844
- Heterochelus dissidens Péringuey, 1902
- Heterochelus ditus Péringuey, 1902
- Heterochelus diversus Kulzer, 1960
- Heterochelus egens Péringuey, 1902
- Heterochelus egenus Péringuey, 1902
- Heterochelus elegans Péringuey, 1902
- Heterochelus escourtianus Péringuey, 1902
- Heterochelus exactor Péringuey, 1902
- Heterochelus fallaciosus Kulzer, 1960
- Heterochelus femoralis Péringuey, 1902
- Heterochelus festivus Kulzer, 1960
- Heterochelus flavus Kulzer, 1960
- Heterochelus forcipatus Burmeister, 1844
- Heterochelus formosus Kulzer, 1960
- Heterochelus forsteri Kulzer, 1960
- Heterochelus fraternus Péringuey, 1902
- Heterochelus fraudulentus Péringuey, 1902
- Heterochelus freudei Kulzer, 1960
- Heterochelus freyi Kulzer, 1960
- Heterochelus furoninus Burmeister, 1844
- Heterochelus gifensis Kulzer, 1960
- Heterochelus gonager (Fabricius, 1781)
- Heterochelus gracilis Kulzer, 1960
- Heterochelus guillarmodi Schein, 1959
- Heterochelus hayeki Kulzer, 1960
- Heterochelus hessei Kulzer, 1960
- Heterochelus humeralis Kulzer, 1960
- Heterochelus hybridus Burmeister, 1844
- Heterochelus ictericus Péringuey, 1902
- Heterochelus incongruens Péringuey, 1902
- Heterochelus indigens Péringuey, 1902
- Heterochelus inornatus Péringuey, 1902
- Heterochelus insignis Péringuey, 1902
- Heterochelus jucundulus Péringuey, 1908
- Heterochelus junodi Kulzer, 1960
- Heterochelus karrooanus Péringuey, 1908
- Heterochelus kochi (Schein, 1958)
- Heterochelus latus Kulzer, 1960
- Heterochelus leoninus Péringuey, 1902
- Heterochelus lituratus Burmeister, 1844
- Heterochelus longicollis Kulzer, 1960
- Heterochelus lugens Burmeister, 1844
- Heterochelus lydenburgensis Kulzer, 1960
- Heterochelus maculatus Kulzer, 1960
- Heterochelus manowanus Moser, 1918
- Heterochelus mimus Péringuey, 1902
- Heterochelus miserabilis Blanchard, 1850
- Heterochelus molestus Péringuey, 1908
- Heterochelus mucronatus Burmeister, 1844
- Heterochelus multidentatus Burmeister, 1844
- Heterochelus murinus Burmeister, 1844
- Heterochelus namibensis Kulzer, 1960
- Heterochelus natalensis Péringuey, 1902
- Heterochelus nigrobtusus Dombrow, 2001
- Heterochelus nubilus Burmeister, 1844
- Heterochelus nudus Kulzer, 1960
- Heterochelus obfuscatus Dombrow, 2001
- Heterochelus ochraceus Burmeister, 1844
- Heterochelus omissus Kulzer, 1960
- Heterochelus optivus Péringuey, 1902
- Heterochelus oreopygus Burmeister, 1844
- Heterochelus ovamboensis Kulzer, 1960
- Heterochelus pachyglutus (Wiedemann, 1823)
- Heterochelus pachymerus (Wiedemann, 1821)
- Heterochelus parapygidialis Kulzer, 1960
- Heterochelus parilis Péringuey, 1902
- Heterochelus pavidus Péringuey, 1908
- Heterochelus pentheri Kulzer, 1960
- Heterochelus persimilis Péringuey, 1902
- Heterochelus pickeri Dombrow, 1997
- Heterochelus placatus Péringuey, 1902
- Heterochelus podagricus (Fabricius, 1781)
- Heterochelus poweri Kulzer, 1960
- Heterochelus promontorii Péringuey, 1902
- Heterochelus pseudopygidialis Kulzer, 1960
- Heterochelus pulverosus Burmeister, 1844
- Heterochelus pygidialis Péringuey, 1902
- Heterochelus quadratus (Wiedemann, 1823)
- Heterochelus rudebecki Kulzer, 1960
- Heterochelus rufimanus (Laporte, 1840)
- Heterochelus saldanhensis Kulzer, 1960
- Heterochelus scheini Kulzer, 1960
- Heterochelus senex Burmeister, 1844
- Heterochelus senilis Péringuey, 1902
- Heterochelus serripes Blanchard, 1850
- Heterochelus sexlineatus (Thunberg, 1818)
- Heterochelus shilouvanus Péringuey, 1908
- Heterochelus similis Kulzer, 1960
- Heterochelus simulans Péringuey, 1902
- Heterochelus simulator Péringuey, 1908
- Heterochelus sobrinus Burmeister, 1844
- Heterochelus soricinus Blanchard, 1850
- Heterochelus spretus Burmeister, 1844
- Heterochelus striatus Burmeister, 1844
- Heterochelus stuckenbergi Kulzer, 1960
- Heterochelus subpilosus (Nonfried, 1891)
- Heterochelus subvittatus Burmeister, 1844
- Heterochelus sulphureus Boheman, 1857
- Heterochelus suspectus (Boheman, 1860)
- Heterochelus swierstrai Kulzer, 1960
- Heterochelus tridens Kulzer, 1960
- Heterochelus tristis Péringuey, 1902
- Heterochelus turneri Kulzer, 1960
- Heterochelus unguiculatus Burmeister, 1844
- Heterochelus unicolor Kulzer, 1960
- Heterochelus vansoni Kulzer, 1960
- Heterochelus viridicollis Blanchard, 1850
- Heterochelus vitreus Kulzer, 1960
- Heterochelus vittiferus Burmeister, 1844
- Heterochelus vulpecula Burmeister, 1844
- Heterochelus vulpinus Burmeister, 1844
- Heterochelus zumpti Kulzer, 1960

== Selected former species ==
- Heterochelus griseus Péringuey, 1908
- Heterochelus minutus Burmeister, 1844
