= Heterochelus delkeskampi =

Scientific classification
- Kingdom: Animalia
- Phylum: Arthropoda
- Class: Insecta
- Order: Coleoptera
- Suborder: Polyphaga
- Infraorder: Scarabaeiformia
- Family: Scarabaeidae
- Genus: Heterochelus
- Species: H. delkeskampi

Binomial name
- Heterochelus delkeskampi Kulzer, 1960

Species of beetle

Heterochelus delkeskampi is a species of beetle of the family Scarabaeidae. It is found in South Africa (Cape).

== Description ==
Adults reach a length of about 8 mm (0.31 in). The head and pronotum are black, the abdomen dark brown and the legs, antennae and elytra reddish-brown. The latter is densely and evenly covered with small, yellow, somewhat pointed scales.
