= Heterochelus lydenburgensis =

Scientific classification
- Kingdom: Animalia
- Phylum: Arthropoda
- Class: Insecta
- Order: Coleoptera
- Suborder: Polyphaga
- Infraorder: Scarabaeiformia
- Family: Scarabaeidae
- Genus: Heterochelus
- Species: H. lydenburgensis

Binomial name
- Heterochelus lydenburgensis Kulzer, 1960

Species of beetle

Heterochelus lydenburgensis is a species of beetle of the family Scarabaeidae. It is found in South Africa (Mpumalanga).

== Description ==
Adults reach a length of about 7.5–8 mm (0.30–0.31 in). The head, pronotum and abdomen are black and shiny, while the legs and elytra are brown, the latter with three striae consisting of long, oval scales. The ribs are sparsely covered with brown hairs.
