= Heterochelus elegans =

Scientific classification
- Kingdom: Animalia
- Phylum: Arthropoda
- Class: Insecta
- Order: Coleoptera
- Suborder: Polyphaga
- Infraorder: Scarabaeiformia
- Family: Scarabaeidae
- Genus: Heterochelus
- Species: H. elegans

Binomial name
- Heterochelus elegans Péringuey, 1902

Species of beetle

Heterochelus elegans is a species of beetle of the family Scarabaeidae. It is found in South Africa (Western Cape).

== Description ==
Adults reach a length of about 6.25–6.5 mm (0.246–0.256 in). Males are black, with the elytra light testaceous, and the legs reddish or occasionally black. The pronotum has a median longitudinal band of yellowish scales and a less distinct outer marginal and basal one. The elytra have three longitudinal bands of similar scales on each side, the pygidium is without scales and the propygidium and abdomen are scaly.
