= Heterochelus hessei =

Scientific classification
- Kingdom: Animalia
- Phylum: Arthropoda
- Class: Insecta
- Order: Coleoptera
- Suborder: Polyphaga
- Infraorder: Scarabaeiformia
- Family: Scarabaeidae
- Genus: Heterochelus
- Species: H. hessei

Binomial name
- Heterochelus hessei Kulzer, 1960

Species of beetle

Heterochelus hessei is a species of beetle of the family Scarabaeidae. It is found in South Africa (Western Cape).

== Description ==
Adults reach a length of about 6–7 mm (0.24–0.28 in). The head, pronotum and abdomen are black, the pronotum with a bronze sheen. The legs are light reddish-brown, and the elytra somewhat darker and densely covered with small, grey to yellow scales.
