= Heterochelus anomalus =

Scientific classification
- Kingdom: Animalia
- Phylum: Arthropoda
- Class: Insecta
- Order: Coleoptera
- Suborder: Polyphaga
- Infraorder: Scarabaeiformia
- Family: Scarabaeidae
- Genus: Heterochelus
- Species: H. anomalus

Binomial name
- Heterochelus anomalus Burmeister, 1844

Species of beetle

Heterochelus anomalus is a species of beetle of the family Scarabaeidae. It is found in South Africa (Cape).

== Description ==
Adults reach a length of about 5 mm (0.20 in). They are black, the scutellum with a few greyish scales. The elytra are dark chestnut-brown and clothed with a very short, appressed greyish pubescence, and along the suture a somewhat obliterated line of sub-flavescent hairs replaced by scales on the apical margins. The pygidium and edges of the abdominal segments are covered with yellow, contiguous scales.
