= Heterochelus vitreus =

Scientific classification
- Kingdom: Animalia
- Phylum: Arthropoda
- Class: Insecta
- Order: Coleoptera
- Suborder: Polyphaga
- Infraorder: Scarabaeiformia
- Family: Scarabaeidae
- Genus: Heterochelus
- Species: H. vitreus

Binomial name
- Heterochelus vitreus Kulzer, 1960

Species of beetle

Heterochelus vitreus is a species of beetle of the family Scarabaeidae. It is found in South Africa (Western Cape).

== Description ==
Adults reach a length of about 6–7 mm (0.24–0.28 in). The head, pronotum and abdomen are black, the legs are reddish-brown to dark brown and the elytra are fawn-brown, with a few hair-like scales at the tip. Sometimes, there is also a stripe of scales at the suture. The rest of the surface of the elytra is covered with short brown hairs.
