= Heterochelus consanguineus =

Scientific classification
- Kingdom: Animalia
- Phylum: Arthropoda
- Class: Insecta
- Order: Coleoptera
- Suborder: Polyphaga
- Infraorder: Scarabaeiformia
- Family: Scarabaeidae
- Genus: Heterochelus
- Species: H. consanguineus

Binomial name
- Heterochelus consanguineus Péringuey, 1902

Species of beetle

Heterochelus consanguineus is a species of beetle of the family Scarabaeidae. It is found in South Africa (Eastern Cape).

== Description ==
Adults reach a length of about 5.75–6.75 mm (0.226–0.266 in). They are reddish brown with the clypeus black. They are similar to Heterochelus sulphureus, but the hairs and the scales are orange-yellow without any greenish tinge. The elytra are distinctly costate, the costae are bristly and have no scales, while the intervals are thickly covered with them. The pygidium is entirely clothed with yellow scales, and has no dark brown patch.
