= Heterochelus incongruens =

Scientific classification
- Kingdom: Animalia
- Phylum: Arthropoda
- Clade: Pancrustacea
- Class: Insecta
- Order: Coleoptera
- Suborder: Polyphaga
- Infraorder: Scarabaeiformia
- Family: Scarabaeidae
- Genus: Heterochelus
- Species: H. incongruens

Binomial name
- Heterochelus incongruens Péringuey, 1902

Species of beetle

Heterochelus incongruens is a species of beetle of the family Scarabaeidae. It is found in South Africa (Western Cape).

== Description ==
Adults reach a length of about 4 mm (0.16 in). Males are black, without traces of scales, and with reddish front legs. The head and pronotum are very scabrose and clothed, especially the latter, with dense, moderately long black hairs. The elytra are clothed with a short but dense fuscous pubescence. The pygidium is very closely and somewhat roughly punctured, not pubescent or scaly, but fringed all around with long setae. Females are very similar to the males and are only recognisable by the shape of the pygidium.
