= Heterochelus murinus =

Scientific classification
- Kingdom: Animalia
- Phylum: Arthropoda
- Class: Insecta
- Order: Coleoptera
- Suborder: Polyphaga
- Infraorder: Scarabaeiformia
- Family: Scarabaeidae
- Genus: Heterochelus
- Species: H. murinus

Binomial name
- Heterochelus murinus Burmeister, 1844

Synonyms
- Heterochelus castaneipennis Blanchard, 1850

Species of beetle

Heterochelus murinus is a species of beetle of the family Scarabaeidae. It is found in South Africa (Western Cape).

== Description ==
Adults reach a length of about 5–6 mm (0.20–0.24 in). They are similar to Heterochelus gonager. They are also black with red legs, and the shape of the elytra and hind legs is similar, but instead of being flavescent or yellow, the scales covering the pronotum, scutellum, elytra, propygidium, and sides of abdomen are greyish white or slightly flavescent. The scales on the elytra are very small, very elongate, somewhat in the shape of a squamose hair, and the whole pygidium, which is very strongly convex in the centre, is glabrous and shining black.
