= Heterochelus dissidens =

Scientific classification
- Kingdom: Animalia
- Phylum: Arthropoda
- Clade: Pancrustacea
- Class: Insecta
- Order: Coleoptera
- Suborder: Polyphaga
- Infraorder: Scarabaeiformia
- Family: Scarabaeidae
- Genus: Heterochelus
- Species: H. dissidens

Binomial name
- Heterochelus dissidens Péringuey, 1902

Species of beetle

Heterochelus dissidens is a species of beetle of the family Scarabaeidae. It is found in South Africa (Western Cape).

== Description ==
Adults reach a length of about 6–7.25 mm (0.236–0.285 in). Males are black, with only the elytra and the scutellum covered with deep orange scales. The head and pronotum are very scabrose, and clothed with a short but dense, erect, black pubescence. The pronotum has a median longitudinal furrow disappearing on the anterior part. The scutellum is covered with scales, which are brighter yellow than those on the elytra, where they are very small and set very close to each other, the suture, however, is without scales. The elytra have three longitudinal rows of very short, remote, black setae on each side, as well as a similar row along the suture. The propygidium, pygidium, sides of the abdomen and legs are briefly and not densely setulose. In females, the pronotum is clothed with longer grey hairs and the scales on the elytra are more lemon-colour, the two costae on each side are quite distinct and usually hairless, and the pygidium and abdomen are hairy.
