= Heterochelus lituratus =

Scientific classification
- Kingdom: Animalia
- Phylum: Arthropoda
- Clade: Pancrustacea
- Class: Insecta
- Order: Coleoptera
- Suborder: Polyphaga
- Infraorder: Scarabaeiformia
- Family: Scarabaeidae
- Genus: Heterochelus
- Species: H. lituratus

Binomial name
- Heterochelus lituratus Burmeister, 1844

Species of beetle

Heterochelus lituratus is a species of beetle of the family Scarabaeidae. It is found in South Africa (Western Cape).

== Description ==
The head is black, strongly punctured on the upper part, and covered with greyish hairs. The anterior part of the pronotum is clothed with greyish-yellow scales, thickly mingled with villose hairs. The median sulcus is conspicuous, but not near the base. The scutellum is thickly scaly. The elytra are also scaly, but the scales on the costae are small, greyish brown, and the costae are bristling with hairs. The scales are disposed in three narrow rows on each side, the outer one ending in the centre, while the two inner ones broaden and merge into one from the median part to the apex. The pygidium is black or brown, shining and clothed with non-contiguous scales. The propygidium is densely scaly, and the sides of abdomen are scaly. The legs are brown or reddish, sparsely bristly.
