= Heterochelus armipes =

Scientific classification
- Kingdom: Animalia
- Phylum: Arthropoda
- Class: Insecta
- Order: Coleoptera
- Suborder: Polyphaga
- Infraorder: Scarabaeiformia
- Family: Scarabaeidae
- Genus: Heterochelus
- Species: H. armipes

Binomial name
- Heterochelus armipes (Boheman, 1857)

Synonyms
- Dichelus (Heterochelus) armipes Boheman, 1857

Species of beetle

Heterochelus armipes is a species of beetle of the family Scarabaeidae. It is found in South Africa (KwaZulu-Natal, Limpopo, Gauteng).

== Description ==
Adults reach a length of about 6–8 mm (0.24–0.31 in). Males have a black head, while the pronotum is aeneous black or reddish with a faint metallic tinge. The elytra are reddish testaceous, and have three distinct dorsal bands of yellowish or sub-flavescent scales, and an indistinct one along the outer margin. The legs are reddish. The pygidium is scaly and has a brown, velvety patch on each side of the base. Females have a black head, thorax and under side. The elytra also have scaly bands, and the pygidium has only a very faint trace of the two black patches, but is as scaly as in males.
