= Heterochelus pachyglutus =

Scientific classification
- Kingdom: Animalia
- Phylum: Arthropoda
- Class: Insecta
- Order: Coleoptera
- Suborder: Polyphaga
- Infraorder: Scarabaeiformia
- Family: Scarabaeidae
- Genus: Heterochelus
- Species: H. pachyglutus

Binomial name
- Heterochelus pachyglutus (Wiedemann, 1823)

Synonyms
- Trichius pachyglutus Wiedemann, 1823

Species of beetle

Heterochelus pachyglutus is a species of beetle of the family Scarabaeidae. It is found in South Africa (Eastern Cape, Western Cape).

== Description ==
Adults reach a length of about 4–4.5 mm (0.16–0.18 in). Males are black, with the pronotum and elytra clothed with yellow scales turning sometimes to orange on the elytra, but having there a sutural and a marginal band of paler scales. The pygidium is hairless at the apex, but the rest of the surface is clothed with yellow scales, with a lateral orange patch on each side, and a transverse one of the same colour on middle of the propygidium. The legs are reddish brown. The pronotum is nearly as densely scaly as the elytra, and the scales are nearly round. The scales on the scutellum are a little paler than on the elytra, but are of the same hue as those which are set along the suture. Females are black with the elytra chestnut-brown and a hairy pronotum. The elytra are sparsely covered with squamose greyish hairs, with only a few scales along the posterior margin.
