= Heterochelus mucronatus =

Scientific classification
- Kingdom: Animalia
- Phylum: Arthropoda
- Clade: Pancrustacea
- Class: Insecta
- Order: Coleoptera
- Suborder: Polyphaga
- Infraorder: Scarabaeiformia
- Family: Scarabaeidae
- Genus: Heterochelus
- Species: H. mucronatus

Binomial name
- Heterochelus mucronatus Burmeister, 1844

Species of beetle

Heterochelus mucronatus is a species of beetle of the family Scarabaeidae. It is found in South Africa (Northern Cape).

== Description ==
Adults reach a length of about 5 mm (0.20 in). They are fully black and somewhat shining. The elytra have a narrow and somewhat indistinct band of squamose greyish hairs, and the apical margin of the elytra has a few golden-yellow scales. The propygidium and abdominal segments have dense golden-yellow scales, and the pygidium is also scaly, but has a hairless, median longitudinal space. The head and pronotum are clothed with a dense, somewhat long, dark pubescence.
