= Heterochelus suspectus =

Scientific classification
- Kingdom: Animalia
- Phylum: Arthropoda
- Class: Insecta
- Order: Coleoptera
- Suborder: Polyphaga
- Infraorder: Scarabaeiformia
- Family: Scarabaeidae
- Genus: Heterochelus
- Species: H. suspectus

Binomial name
- Heterochelus suspectus (Boheman, 1860)

Synonyms
- Dichelus suspectus Boheman, 1860

Species of beetle

Heterochelus suspectus is a species of beetle of the family Scarabaeidae. It is found in Namibia.

== Description ==
Adults reach a length of about 5.5–6 mm (0.22–0.24 in). The head and pronotum are black, sometimes with a metallic sheen. The underside is also black and the legs are reddish-brown (with the anterior ones darker). The elytra are brown and fairly densely and evenly covered with yellow, long scales.
