= Heterochelus longicollis =

Scientific classification
- Kingdom: Animalia
- Phylum: Arthropoda
- Class: Insecta
- Order: Coleoptera
- Suborder: Polyphaga
- Infraorder: Scarabaeiformia
- Family: Scarabaeidae
- Genus: Heterochelus
- Species: H. longicollis

Binomial name
- Heterochelus longicollis Kulzer, 1960

Species of beetle

Heterochelus longicollis is a species of beetle of the family Scarabaeidae. It is found in South Africa (Western Cape, Mpumalanga).

== Description ==
Adults reach a length of about 6–6.5 mm (0.24–0.26 in). They have a black, elongate body. The legs are reddish-brown to dark brown and the elytra are mostly light brown and have long, yellow scales.
