= Heterochelus controversus =

Scientific classification
- Kingdom: Animalia
- Phylum: Arthropoda
- Clade: Pancrustacea
- Class: Insecta
- Order: Coleoptera
- Suborder: Polyphaga
- Infraorder: Scarabaeiformia
- Family: Scarabaeidae
- Genus: Heterochelus
- Species: H. controversus

Binomial name
- Heterochelus controversus Péringuey, 1902

Species of beetle

Heterochelus controversus is a species of beetle of the family Scarabaeidae. It is found in South Africa (Northern Cape).

== Description ==
Adults reach a length of about 4 mm (0.16 in). They are bronze, covered on the pronotum with a thick somewhat lanuginose golden yellow pubescence, and with thick contiguous scales of the same colour on the elytra, pygidial part, and abdomen. The legs are red, with a metallic tinge. The pubescence of the pronotum is very thick and moderately long.
