= Heterochelus escourtianus =

Scientific classification
- Kingdom: Animalia
- Phylum: Arthropoda
- Class: Insecta
- Order: Coleoptera
- Suborder: Polyphaga
- Infraorder: Scarabaeiformia
- Family: Scarabaeidae
- Genus: Heterochelus
- Species: H. escourtianus

Binomial name
- Heterochelus escourtianus Péringuey, 1902

Species of beetle

Heterochelus escourtianus is a species of beetle of the family Scarabaeidae. It is found in South Africa (KwaZulu-Natal).

== Description ==
Adults reach a length of about 6.5 mm (0.26 in). They are totally black, the scutellum, pygidial part and abdomen clothed with deep yellow scales. The head and pronotum are densely villose, with the hairs greyish. The pronotum has a shallow median groove reaching from the median part to the base. The elytra are distinctly bi-striate and slightly bi-costulate on each side, coriaceous and clothed with a thick but very short appressed greyish pubescence. The propygidium, abdomen, pectus and legs are villose, with the hairs flavescent.
