= Heterochelus braunsi =

Scientific classification
- Kingdom: Animalia
- Phylum: Arthropoda
- Class: Insecta
- Order: Coleoptera
- Suborder: Polyphaga
- Infraorder: Scarabaeiformia
- Family: Scarabaeidae
- Genus: Heterochelus
- Species: H. braunsi

Binomial name
- Heterochelus braunsi Kulzer, 1960

Species of beetle

Heterochelus braunsi is a species of beetle of the family Scarabaeidae. It is found in South Africa (Eastern Cape).

== Description ==
Adults reach a length of about 5–6 mm (0.20–0.24 in). The head, pronotum and abdomen are black, while the legs and elytra are reddish-brown, the latter with three sharply defined stripes consisting of round, yellow scales. The weak ribs are very sparsely covered with brown hairs.
