= Heterochelus mimus =

Scientific classification
- Kingdom: Animalia
- Phylum: Arthropoda
- Class: Insecta
- Order: Coleoptera
- Suborder: Polyphaga
- Infraorder: Scarabaeiformia
- Family: Scarabaeidae
- Genus: Heterochelus
- Species: H. mimus

Binomial name
- Heterochelus mimus Péringuey, 1902

Species of beetle

Heterochelus mimus is a species of beetle of the family Scarabaeidae. It is found in South Africa (KwaZulu-Natal, North West).

== Description ==
Adults reach a length of about 5.5–7 mm (0.22–0.28 in). They are very similar to Heterochelus consanguineus. The colour is the same, but a little more metallic, and the scales are paler. The pygidium, which in D. consanguineus is entirely covered with scales, has two brown basal patches in D. mimus.
