= Heterochelus saldanhensis =

Scientific classification
- Kingdom: Animalia
- Phylum: Arthropoda
- Class: Insecta
- Order: Coleoptera
- Suborder: Polyphaga
- Infraorder: Scarabaeiformia
- Family: Scarabaeidae
- Genus: Heterochelus
- Species: H. saldanhensis

Binomial name
- Heterochelus saldanhensis Kulzer, 1960

Species of beetle

Heterochelus saldanhensis is a species of beetle of the family Scarabaeidae. It is found in South Africa (Western Cape).

== Description ==
Adults reach a length of about 4.5–5 mm (0.18–0.20 in). They are entirely black, with the elytra densely and uniformly covered with grey, yellow or orange-yellow, small and round scales.
