= Heterochelus brincki =

Scientific classification
- Kingdom: Animalia
- Phylum: Arthropoda
- Class: Insecta
- Order: Coleoptera
- Suborder: Polyphaga
- Infraorder: Scarabaeiformia
- Family: Scarabaeidae
- Genus: Heterochelus
- Species: H. brincki

Binomial name
- Heterochelus brincki Kulzer, 1960

Species of beetle

Heterochelus brincki is a species of beetle of the family Scarabaeidae. It is found in South Africa (KwaZulu-Natal).

== Description ==
Adults reach a length of about 7–8 mm (0.28–0.31 in). The head, pronotum and underside are black, with a slight bronze sheen. The legs and elytra are reddish-brown, the latter with three broad, indistinct stripes, consisting of round, yellow scales. The ribs are covered with hair-like, very pointed, yellow scales.
