= Heterochelus unguiculatus =

Scientific classification
- Kingdom: Animalia
- Phylum: Arthropoda
- Class: Insecta
- Order: Coleoptera
- Suborder: Polyphaga
- Infraorder: Scarabaeiformia
- Family: Scarabaeidae
- Genus: Heterochelus
- Species: H. unguiculatus

Binomial name
- Heterochelus unguiculatus Burmeister, 1844

Species of beetle

Heterochelus unguiculatus is a species of beetle of the family Scarabaeidae. It is found in South Africa (Western Cape).

== Description ==
Adults reach a length of about 8.5–10 mm (0.33–0.39 in). They are black, with the elytra burnt sienna-brown. All the legs are ferruginous red. The head and pronotum are closely and densely scabroso-punctate, and clothed with short, dense, greyish and brown hair. The scutellum is clothed with short hairs similar in colour and density to the very short sub-erect ones which run along the suture. The elytra are clothed with appressed, very dense and not squamulose brown hairs. The propygidium and the pygidium are clothed with dense black hairs.
