= Heterochelus forsteri =

Scientific classification
- Kingdom: Animalia
- Phylum: Arthropoda
- Class: Insecta
- Order: Coleoptera
- Suborder: Polyphaga
- Infraorder: Scarabaeiformia
- Family: Scarabaeidae
- Genus: Heterochelus
- Species: H. forsteri

Binomial name
- Heterochelus forsteri Kulzer, 1960

Species of beetle

Heterochelus forsteri is a species of beetle of the family Scarabaeidae. It is found in South Africa (Eastern Cape).

== Description ==
Adults reach a length of about 4–5 mm (0.16–0.20 in). They are black, with only the two frontal pairs of legs and the antennae reddish-brown. The elytra are sometimes brown, but always have a sutural stria, as well as a discal and a lateral stria, which consist of one row of white scales.
