= Heterochelus kochi =

Scientific classification
- Kingdom: Animalia
- Phylum: Arthropoda
- Class: Insecta
- Order: Coleoptera
- Suborder: Polyphaga
- Infraorder: Scarabaeiformia
- Family: Scarabaeidae
- Genus: Heterochelus
- Species: H. kochi

Binomial name
- Heterochelus kochi (Schein, 1958)

Synonyms
- Dichelus kochi Schein, 1958

Species of beetle

Heterochelus kochi is a species of beetle of the family Scarabaeidae. It is found in South Africa (Western Cape).

== Description ==
Adults reach a length of about 5–6 mm (0.20–0.24 in). They are black with two white bands of scales on each elytron, as well as a white-scaled pygidial area.
