= Heterochelus fallaciosus =

Scientific classification
- Kingdom: Animalia
- Phylum: Arthropoda
- Class: Insecta
- Order: Coleoptera
- Suborder: Polyphaga
- Infraorder: Scarabaeiformia
- Family: Scarabaeidae
- Genus: Heterochelus
- Species: H. fallaciosus

Binomial name
- Heterochelus fallaciosus Kulzer, 1960

Species of beetle

Heterochelus fallaciosus is a species of beetle of the family Scarabaeidae. It is found in South Africa (KwaZulu-Natal).

== Description ==
Adults reach a length of about 6.5–7 mm (0.26–0.28 in). The head, pronotum and underside are black, the pronotum with a green sheen. The legs and elytra are very dark brown. Each elytron has three white scale bands. The scales are oblong-oval and pointed at both ends. The ribs have sparse, long, white scale-like hairs.
