= Heterochelus tristis =

Scientific classification
- Kingdom: Animalia
- Phylum: Arthropoda
- Clade: Pancrustacea
- Class: Insecta
- Order: Coleoptera
- Suborder: Polyphaga
- Infraorder: Scarabaeiformia
- Family: Scarabaeidae
- Genus: Heterochelus
- Species: H. tristis

Binomial name
- Heterochelus tristis Péringuey, 1902

Species of beetle

Heterochelus tristis is a species of beetle of the family Scarabaeidae. It is found in South Africa (KwaZuluNatal, Gauteng).

== Description ==
Adults reach a length of about 6–6.5 mm (0.24–0.26 in).

The male is black in colour and has a faint sheen. Its body is clothed in a fine black covering of hairs, shorter on the hardened wing covers (elytra) but longer and somewhat shaggy on the prothorax. At the rear of the abdomen, the pygidium is strongly convex at the base and is covered with a velvety layer of black tomentum, giving it a soft, matte appearance.

The head and prothorax are densely marked with coarse, rough punctures. The front plate of the head (clypeus) is straight across and forms an angle on each side, though these angles do not bend upward. The prothorax itself lacks scales. The small triangular plate between the wing covers, the scutellum, sometimes bears scales that are faintly yellowish in color.

Each elytron shows two very slight longitudinal ridges on each side. The surface is closely and somewhat roughly punctured and covered with a dark brownish covering of fine short hairs (pubescence). Along the area near the suture between the wing covers, and also across the raised bands between the grooves of across the elytra (the central discal intervals), there are a few somewhat yellowish hairs that appear slightly scale-like and are arranged diagonally.

The segment just before the pygidium (the final segment), the propygidium, does not appear distinctly scaly. However, the sides of the abdomen bear clearly visible orange, scale-like hairs. The hind femora are thick and sturdy. The trochanter bears a spine that is fused with the femur but projects slightly toward the middle of the body. A short distance from it there is another distinct spine that is somewhat hook-shaped.

The hind tibiae are compressed and their underside has a nearly square vertical plate with two teeth. At the tip there is also a sharp horizontal spur (mucro) that lies almost in line with these teeth. Finally, the claws of the hind feet (tarsi) are unequal: the inner claw is less than half the length of the outer one, while the outer claw is split at its end.

At the time of writing the source for the description, female specimen were yet undiscovered.

== Habitat ==
Natal (Newcastle), Transvaal (Johannesburg).
