= Heterochelus striatus =

Scientific classification
- Kingdom: Animalia
- Phylum: Arthropoda
- Clade: Pancrustacea
- Class: Insecta
- Order: Coleoptera
- Suborder: Polyphaga
- Infraorder: Scarabaeiformia
- Family: Scarabaeidae
- Genus: Heterochelus
- Species: H. striatus

Binomial name
- Heterochelus striatus Burmeister, 1844

Species of beetle

Heterochelus striatus is a species of beetle of the family Scarabaeidae. It is found in South Africa (Cape).

== Description ==
Adults reach a length of about 5 mm (0.20 in). The elytra have whitish scale-like bands, with the intervals dark and sparsely pubescent. The pygidium is white-scaled with a bare apex.
