= Heterochelus spretus =

Scientific classification
- Kingdom: Animalia
- Phylum: Arthropoda
- Class: Insecta
- Order: Coleoptera
- Suborder: Polyphaga
- Infraorder: Scarabaeiformia
- Family: Scarabaeidae
- Genus: Heterochelus
- Species: H. spretus

Binomial name
- Heterochelus spretus Burmeister, 1844

Species of beetle

Heterochelus spretus is a species of beetle of the family Scarabaeidae. It is found in South Africa (Cape).

== Description ==
Adults reach a length of about 5 mm (0.20 in). The head, pronotum and abdomen are black, while the legs and elytra are very dark brown. The elytra have a sutural stripe of white scales, as well as a discal stripe consisting of only one row of scales. The rest of the elytra is sparsely covered with short, brown hairs.
