= Heterochelus fraudulentus =

Scientific classification
- Kingdom: Animalia
- Phylum: Arthropoda
- Clade: Pancrustacea
- Class: Insecta
- Order: Coleoptera
- Suborder: Polyphaga
- Infraorder: Scarabaeiformia
- Family: Scarabaeidae
- Genus: Heterochelus
- Species: H. fraudulentus

Binomial name
- Heterochelus fraudulentus Péringuey, 1902

Species of beetle

Heterochelus fraudulentus is a species of beetle of the family Scarabaeidae. It is found in South Africa (Western Cape).

== Description ==
Adults reach a length of about 6 mm (0.24 in). They are black, with the elytra and legs reddish brown and with the scutellum, the pygidial part and the abdomen clothed with contiguous flavescent scales. The elytra have three narrow bands of similar scales. The head and pronotum are clothed with a long, villose sub-flavescent pubescence. The elytra are clothed with dense, greyish appressed hairs, and the three bands consist of round scales situated in two very shallow longitudinal depressions. The legs are reddish, with the hind ones piceous red.
