= Heterochelus denticeps =

Scientific classification
- Kingdom: Animalia
- Phylum: Arthropoda
- Class: Insecta
- Order: Coleoptera
- Suborder: Polyphaga
- Infraorder: Scarabaeiformia
- Family: Scarabaeidae
- Genus: Heterochelus
- Species: H. denticeps

Binomial name
- Heterochelus denticeps (Wiedemann, 1821)

Synonyms
- Trichius denticeps Wiedemann, 1821; Dichelus denticeps

Species of beetle

Heterochelus denticeps is a species of beetle of the family Scarabaeidae. It is found in South Africa (Western Cape).

== Description ==
Adults reach a length of about 5–5.5 mm (0.20–0.22 in). They are black, with the elytra and legs brick-red, scaleless except on the scutellum, and with a narrow band of yellowish scales on the edge of the propygidium and on the sides of the abdomen. The head is clothed with fulvous hairs. The pronotum is punctate, but not along the base. The punctures each bear a flavescent, erect hair but are not very dense.
