= Heterochelus hybridus =

Scientific classification
- Kingdom: Animalia
- Phylum: Arthropoda
- Class: Insecta
- Order: Coleoptera
- Suborder: Polyphaga
- Infraorder: Scarabaeiformia
- Family: Scarabaeidae
- Genus: Heterochelus
- Species: H. hybridus

Binomial name
- Heterochelus hybridus Burmeister, 1844

Synonyms
- Heterochelus hospes Péringuey, 1902

Species of beetle

Heterochelus hybridus is a species of beetle of the family Scarabaeidae. It is found in South Africa (Western Cape).

== Description ==
Adults reach a length of about 4 mm (0.16 in). Males are black, with the elytra covered with ochre-yellow or orange scales. The pronotum is not scaly, while the pygidium and sides of the abdomen are clothed with orange-yellow scales. The pronotum is clothed with sparse, decumbent, very short greyish hairs. The scutellum is densely scaly. Females are similar to males, but the elytra are redder-brown and clothed with squamose hairs.
