= Heterochelus parapygidialis =

Scientific classification
- Kingdom: Animalia
- Phylum: Arthropoda
- Class: Insecta
- Order: Coleoptera
- Suborder: Polyphaga
- Infraorder: Scarabaeiformia
- Family: Scarabaeidae
- Genus: Heterochelus
- Species: H. parapygidialis

Binomial name
- Heterochelus parapygidialis Kulzer, 1960

Species of beetle

Heterochelus parapygidialis is a species of beetle of the family Scarabaeidae. It is found in South Africa (Western Cape).

== Description ==
Adults reach a length of about 5 mm (0.20 in). The head and scutellum are black, while the abdomen is dark brown and the pronotum, elytra, legs and antennae are light reddish-brown. The elytra have a broad, yellow band of scales along the suture and a narrower discal band.
