= Heterochelus ovamboensis =

Scientific classification
- Kingdom: Animalia
- Phylum: Arthropoda
- Class: Insecta
- Order: Coleoptera
- Suborder: Polyphaga
- Infraorder: Scarabaeiformia
- Family: Scarabaeidae
- Genus: Heterochelus
- Species: H. ovamboensis

Binomial name
- Heterochelus ovamboensis Kulzer, 1960

Species of beetle

Heterochelus ovamboensis is a species of beetle of the family Scarabaeidae. It is found in Namibia, South Africa (Northern Cape) and Zimbabwe.

== Description ==
Adults reach a length of about 4–4.5 mm (0.16–0.18 in). The head, pronotum, abdomen, and antennae are black, while the legs and elytra are reddish-brown. The scutellum, pygidium, propygidium and abdomen are very densely covered with white and yellowish scales, while the elytra are finely covered with white hairs. Erect white hairs are found on the pronotum and underside.
