= Heterochelus unicolor =

Scientific classification
- Kingdom: Animalia
- Phylum: Arthropoda
- Class: Insecta
- Order: Coleoptera
- Suborder: Polyphaga
- Infraorder: Scarabaeiformia
- Family: Scarabaeidae
- Genus: Heterochelus
- Species: H. unicolor

Binomial name
- Heterochelus unicolor Kulzer, 1960

Species of beetle

Heterochelus unicolor is a species of beetle of the family Scarabaeidae. It is found in South Africa (Western Cape).

== Description ==
Adults reach a length of about 4.5 mm (0.18 in). They are black, with dark brown legs. The pronotum, scutellum, elytra, pygidium, propygidium and abdomen are densely covered with sulfur-yellow, almost round scales. The pronotum also has a few erect yellow hairs on the sides.
