= Heterochelus flavus =

Scientific classification
- Kingdom: Animalia
- Phylum: Arthropoda
- Class: Insecta
- Order: Coleoptera
- Suborder: Polyphaga
- Infraorder: Scarabaeiformia
- Family: Scarabaeidae
- Genus: Heterochelus
- Species: H. flavus

Binomial name
- Heterochelus flavus Kulzer, 1960

Species of beetle

Heterochelus flavus is a species of beetle of the family Scarabaeidae. It is found in South Africa (Western Cape).

== Description ==
Adults reach a length of about 6.5–7 mm (0.26–0.28 in). They are black, with the front legs and antennae reddish-brown. The base of the pronotum, scutellum, elytra and pygidium are densely covered with sulfur-yellow, rounded scales. The propygidium without a margin of scales and the abdomen is very sparsely covered with white hairs.
