= Heterochelus consors =

Scientific classification
- Kingdom: Animalia
- Phylum: Arthropoda
- Class: Insecta
- Order: Coleoptera
- Suborder: Polyphaga
- Infraorder: Scarabaeiformia
- Family: Scarabaeidae
- Genus: Heterochelus
- Species: H. consors

Binomial name
- Heterochelus consors Péringuey, 1902

Species of beetle

Heterochelus consors is a species of beetle of the family Scarabaeidae. It is found in South Africa (Western Cape).

== Description ==
Adults reach a length of about 6.25 mm (0.246 in). They are greenish black and shining. The elytra have two interrupted bands of sub-flavescent scales on each side. The pygidium is hairless, shining and impunctate.
