= Heterochelus pentheri =

Scientific classification
- Kingdom: Animalia
- Phylum: Arthropoda
- Class: Insecta
- Order: Coleoptera
- Suborder: Polyphaga
- Infraorder: Scarabaeiformia
- Family: Scarabaeidae
- Genus: Heterochelus
- Species: H. pentheri

Binomial name
- Heterochelus pentheri Kulzer, 1960

Species of beetle

Heterochelus pentheri is a species of beetle of the family Scarabaeidae. It is found in South Africa (Cape).

== Description ==
Adults reach a length of about 6.5 mm (0.26 in). They are black, with the elytra almost black and with a few yellow scales at the suture at the rear and at the tip. The rest is sparsely covered with dark hairs.
