= Heterochelus bivittatus =

Scientific classification
- Kingdom: Animalia
- Phylum: Arthropoda
- Class: Insecta
- Order: Coleoptera
- Suborder: Polyphaga
- Infraorder: Scarabaeiformia
- Family: Scarabaeidae
- Genus: Heterochelus
- Species: H. bivittatus

Binomial name
- Heterochelus bivittatus Burmeister, 1844

Species of beetle

Heterochelus bivittatus is a species of beetle of the family Scarabaeidae. It is found in South Africa (Northern Cape).

== Description ==
Adults reach a length of about 7.5–8.5 mm (0.30–0.33 in). Males are black, with the elytra and the hind legs shining red and the pronotum with a median longitudinal line of white. The elytra have a discoidal line of similar scales. The scutellum, abdomen and pygidium are clothed with contiguous white scales, but the latter has a median longitudinal hairless line which does not reach to the apex. Females are similar to males, but the elytra are more distinctly costulate. The median line on the pronotum and the discoidal one on the elytra are white as in males, and so is the scutellum, but the scales on the abdomen and pygidium are yellow, and the latter has three elongate, dark patches, the median of which is more elongate than the others.
