= Heterochelus pachymerus =

Scientific classification
- Kingdom: Animalia
- Phylum: Arthropoda
- Clade: Pancrustacea
- Class: Insecta
- Order: Coleoptera
- Suborder: Polyphaga
- Infraorder: Scarabaeiformia
- Family: Scarabaeidae
- Genus: Heterochelus
- Species: H. pachymerus

Binomial name
- Heterochelus pachymerus (Wiedemann, 1821)

Synonyms
- Trichius pachymerus Wiedemann, 1821

Species of beetle

Heterochelus pachymerus is a species of beetle of the family Scarabaeidae. It is found in South Africa (Cape).

== Description ==
Adults reach a length of about 7.5 mm (0.30 in). They are black, covered with greyish scales. The pronotum is most densely pilose and the elytra and legs are rufescent, the latter with greyish hairs.
