= Heterochelus exactor =

Scientific classification
- Kingdom: Animalia
- Phylum: Arthropoda
- Class: Insecta
- Order: Coleoptera
- Suborder: Polyphaga
- Infraorder: Scarabaeiformia
- Family: Scarabaeidae
- Genus: Heterochelus
- Species: H. exactor

Binomial name
- Heterochelus exactor Péringuey, 1902

Species of beetle

Heterochelus exactor is a species of beetle of the family Scarabaeidae. It is found in South Africa (Western Cape).

== Description ==
Adults reach a length of about 6 mm (0.24 in). They are black, with only the abdomonial segments edged with flavescent scales, a few of which are also seen on the sides of the metasternum. The elytra are very dark fuscous brown, densely but very briefly pubescent, and without any trace of scales.
