= Heterochelus pulverosus =

Scientific classification
- Kingdom: Animalia
- Phylum: Arthropoda
- Clade: Pancrustacea
- Class: Insecta
- Order: Coleoptera
- Suborder: Polyphaga
- Infraorder: Scarabaeiformia
- Family: Scarabaeidae
- Genus: Heterochelus
- Species: H. pulverosus

Binomial name
- Heterochelus pulverosus Burmeister, 1844

Species of beetle

Heterochelus pulverosus is a species of beetle of the family Scarabaeidae. It is found in South Africa (Western Cape).

== Description ==
Adults reach a length of about 5.25 mm (0.207 in). They are black, with the elytra briefly pilose and with a somewhat interrupted band of yellow scales along the suture, which borders also the apical margin. The propygidium and sides of the abdomen are clothed with yellow scales and the pygidium is hairless. The head and pronotum are briefly pubescent, with the pubescence black.
