= Heterochelus podagricus =

Scientific classification
- Kingdom: Animalia
- Phylum: Arthropoda
- Clade: Pancrustacea
- Class: Insecta
- Order: Coleoptera
- Suborder: Polyphaga
- Infraorder: Scarabaeiformia
- Family: Scarabaeidae
- Genus: Heterochelus
- Species: H. podagricus

Binomial name
- Heterochelus podagricus (Fabricius, 1781)

Synonyms
- Melolontha podagrica Fabricius, 1781; Melolontha calcarata Fabricius, 1798

Species of beetle

Heterochelus podagricus is a species of beetle of the family Scarabaeidae. It is found in South Africa (Western Cape, Eastern Cape).

== Description ==
Adults reach a length of about 7–8 mm (0.28–0.31 in). Males are black, the elytra with a broad discoidal patch of slightly flavescent, small, contiguous scales extending over the greater part of the discoidal part, but bi-sinuate on each side past the median part, and an apical band of similar scales ascending the posterior part of the outer margin. The legs are piceous. The antennae (except for the club) are rufescent. The head and pronotum are scabroso-punctate and clothed with a short, erect, greyish-black pubescence. The scutellum is briefly but densely pilose. The elytra sometimes turn to dark chocolate-brown, and the space between the discoidal patch and the apical band is clothed with a somewhat velvety fuscous tomentum. The propygidium and pygidium are without scales and glabrous. The legs and abdomen of the females are more rufescent and the pronotum is clothed with longer hairs which are also more flavescent, and nearly the whole surface of the elytra is covered with flavescent scales except the humeral callus, and two discoidal longitudinal bands.
