= Heterochelus promontorii =

Scientific classification
- Kingdom: Animalia
- Phylum: Arthropoda
- Class: Insecta
- Order: Coleoptera
- Suborder: Polyphaga
- Infraorder: Scarabaeiformia
- Family: Scarabaeidae
- Genus: Heterochelus
- Species: H. promontorii

Binomial name
- Heterochelus promontorii Péringuey, 1902

Species of beetle

Heterochelus promontorii is a species of beetle of the family Scarabaeidae. It is found in South Africa (Western Cape).

== Description ==
Adults reach a length of about 4.5 mm (0.18 in). Males are black, with the elytra chestnut-red or dark bronze. The scutellum, the propygidium, and the abdomen are clothed with dense yellowish scales, but the pygidium is glabrous and shining, and the elytra have a sutural band of similar scales beginning at about the median part and continued on the apical, and a discoidal one reaching from the base to the middle. Females are similar to males, but the scales on the elytra are replaced by inconspicuous, sub-squamose hairs.
