= Heterochelus binotatus =

Scientific classification
- Kingdom: Animalia
- Phylum: Arthropoda
- Class: Insecta
- Order: Coleoptera
- Suborder: Polyphaga
- Infraorder: Scarabaeiformia
- Family: Scarabaeidae
- Genus: Heterochelus
- Species: H. binotatus

Binomial name
- Heterochelus binotatus (Thunberg, 1818)

Synonyms
- Trichius binotatus Thunberg, 1818; Monochelus binotatus kolbeae Burmeister, 1844

Species of beetle

Heterochelus binotatus is a species of beetle of the family Scarabaeidae. It is found in South Africa (Western Cape).

== Description ==
Adults reach a length of about 3.75–5 mm (0.148–0.197 in). Males are black, with the elytra piceous, the front legs reddish, and the scutellum, apical margin of the elytra, abdomen, propygidium, and pygidium clothed with golden-yellow scales. The latter has two sub-denuded, basal patches. Females are similar to males, but the elytra are testaceous, and there is a sutural band of squamose hairs. Also, the pygidium is entirely covered with flavescent scales, but there is on each side of the base an orange patch. The legs are reddish.
