= Heterochelus gracilis =

Scientific classification
- Kingdom: Animalia
- Phylum: Arthropoda
- Class: Insecta
- Order: Coleoptera
- Suborder: Polyphaga
- Infraorder: Scarabaeiformia
- Family: Scarabaeidae
- Genus: Heterochelus
- Species: H. gracilis

Binomial name
- Heterochelus gracilis Kulzer, 1960

Species of beetle

Heterochelus gracilis is a species of beetle of the family Scarabaeidae. It is found in South Africa (Western Cape, Northern Cape).

== Description ==
Adults reach a length of about 5–5.5 mm (0.20–0.22 in). They have a black, somewhat elongated body, with the elytra and legs dark brown to black.
