= Heterochelus armatus =

Scientific classification
- Kingdom: Animalia
- Phylum: Arthropoda
- Class: Insecta
- Order: Coleoptera
- Suborder: Polyphaga
- Infraorder: Scarabaeiformia
- Family: Scarabaeidae
- Genus: Heterochelus
- Species: H. armatus

Binomial name
- Heterochelus armatus Burmeister, 1844

Species of beetle

Heterochelus armatus is a species of beetle of the family Scarabaeidae. It is found in South Africa (Eastern Cape).

== Description ==
Adults reach a length of about 4–4.5 mm (0.16–0.18 in). Males are black, with the elytra and legs reddish. The head and pronotum are moderately densely pubescent, and have some flavescent scales which can, however, be traced along the base. The scutellum, elytra, propygidium, pygidium and sides of the abdomen are clothed with ochraceous-yellow, contiguous scales. Females have darker elytra and are sparsely clothed on the upper side with greyish hairs, which are more squamose on the elytra than on the pronotum. The scales on the pygidium and abdomen are similar to those of the males.
