= Heterochelus analis =

Scientific classification
- Kingdom: Animalia
- Phylum: Arthropoda
- Class: Insecta
- Order: Coleoptera
- Suborder: Polyphaga
- Infraorder: Scarabaeiformia
- Family: Scarabaeidae
- Genus: Heterochelus
- Species: H. analis

Binomial name
- Heterochelus analis Burmeister, 1844

Species of beetle

Heterochelus analis is a species of beetle of the family Scarabaeidae. It is found in South Africa (Western Cape).

== Description ==
Adults reach a length of about 4–4.5 mm (0.16–0.18 in). Males are black, with the elytra chestnut-brown and the legs either dark brown or black. The pronotum is deeply grooved from the median part to the base, densely but somewhat briefly hairy, the hairs are slightly flavescent and there is no basal band of scales. The scutellum is clothed with appressed, squamose hairs and the elytra are covered with appressed, slightly flavescent and squamose hairs which do not hide the colour of the background, and occasionally have a narrow apical band of yellow scales. The apical part of the propygidium and the pygidium have contiguous golden-yellow scales, the latter with two darker yellow longitudinal patches. Females have testaceous elytra and with the suture is sometimes black.
