= Heterochelus arthriticus =

Scientific classification
- Kingdom: Animalia
- Phylum: Arthropoda
- Clade: Pancrustacea
- Class: Insecta
- Order: Coleoptera
- Suborder: Polyphaga
- Infraorder: Scarabaeiformia
- Family: Scarabaeidae
- Genus: Heterochelus
- Species: H. arthriticus

Binomial name
- Heterochelus arthriticus (Fabricius, 1781)

Synonyms
- Melolontha arthritica Fabricius, 1781; Melolontha abbreviata Fabricius, 1781

Species of beetle

Heterochelus arthriticus is a species of beetle of the family Scarabaeidae. It is found in South Africa (Western Cape).

== Description ==
Adults reach a length of about 4–6 mm (0.16–0.24 in). Males are black, with the elytra fuscous brown. The scutellum is sparsely covered with greyish-white scales which narrowly edge the propygidium and the segments of the abdomen. The pygidium is without any scales. The head and pronotum are clothed with a dense, moderately short, black pubescence. The elytra are clothed with a dense appressed dark pubescence. Females are black, with the elytra light testaceous. The pubescence on the pronotum is longer and lighter, the scales are more like squamose hairs on the propygidium and the abdominal segments. The pygidium is without scales and is pubescent.
