= Heterochelus sulphureus =

Scientific classification
- Kingdom: Animalia
- Phylum: Arthropoda
- Class: Insecta
- Order: Coleoptera
- Suborder: Polyphaga
- Infraorder: Scarabaeiformia
- Family: Scarabaeidae
- Genus: Heterochelus
- Species: H. sulphureus

Binomial name
- Heterochelus sulphureus Boheman, 1857

Species of beetle

Heterochelus sulphureus is a species of beetle of the family Scarabaeidae. It is found in South Africa (KwaZulu-Natal, Eastern Cape).

== Description ==
Adults reach a length of about 6.5–8 mm (0.26–0.31 in). They are very dark brown or fuscous and with a metallic tinge, which is very noticeable on the hind legs. The head and pronotum are clothed with a very short, but dense yellowish-green pubescence. The elytra are entirely covered with yellowish-green scales. The pygidium is scaly and has two basal, brownish, velvety patches. Females are much smaller than males and have chestnut-brown elytra with four bands of yellowish lanceolate hairs on each side. The pygidium is covered with yellowish scales, and has two basal, dark brown spots.
