= Heterochelus shilouvanus =

Scientific classification
- Kingdom: Animalia
- Phylum: Arthropoda
- Class: Insecta
- Order: Coleoptera
- Suborder: Polyphaga
- Infraorder: Scarabaeiformia
- Family: Scarabaeidae
- Genus: Heterochelus
- Species: H. shilouvanus

Binomial name
- Heterochelus shilouvanus Péringuey, 1908

Species of beetle

Heterochelus shilouvanus is a species of beetle of the family Scarabaeidae. It is found in South Africa (Eastern Cape).

== Description ==
Adults reach a length of about 7 mm (0.28 in). They are black with a greenish metallic sheen which is very distinct on the sides of the pronotum, and still more so on the two discoidal costae of the elytra and the suture. The hind legs are red. The pronotum is not scaly, but clothed with long, greyish, partly appressed hairs. The scutellum scaly, with long scales. The elytra are sharply costate and with the suture conspicuously raised and denuded, the intervals filled with short, lanceolate greyish flavescent scales forming three distinct bands. The propygidium and pygidium are covered with contiguous yellow scales.
