= Heterochelus forcipatus =

Scientific classification
- Kingdom: Animalia
- Phylum: Arthropoda
- Class: Insecta
- Order: Coleoptera
- Suborder: Polyphaga
- Infraorder: Scarabaeiformia
- Family: Scarabaeidae
- Genus: Heterochelus
- Species: H. forcipatus

Binomial name
- Heterochelus forcipatus Burmeister, 1844

Synonyms
- Heterochelus spurius Péringuey, 1902; Heterochelus dentifrons Blanchard, 1850; Heterochelus uncinatus Blanchard, 1850

Species of beetle

Heterochelus forcipatus is a species of beetle of the family Scarabaeidae. It is found in South Africa (Western Cape).

== Description ==
Adults reach a length of about 3.5–4.5 mm (0.14–0.18 in). Males are black, with the front legs reddish and the elytra fuscous brown and covered with greyish appressed hairs and with a few minute greyish scales along the apical margin. The propygidium and the abdominal segments have narrow bands of similar scales, while the pygidium is not scaly. The elytra of the females are light testaceous and not very hairy and the pygidium is clothed with scales and has a darker patch on each side.
