= Heterochelus vulpinus =

Scientific classification
- Kingdom: Animalia
- Phylum: Arthropoda
- Class: Insecta
- Order: Coleoptera
- Suborder: Polyphaga
- Infraorder: Scarabaeiformia
- Family: Scarabaeidae
- Genus: Heterochelus
- Species: H. vulpinus

Binomial name
- Heterochelus vulpinus Burmeister, 1844

Species of beetle

Heterochelus vulpinus is a species of beetle of the family Scarabaeidae. It is found in South Africa (Eastern Cape, Western Cape).

== Description ==
Adults reach a length of about 6.75–7.25 mm (0.266–0.285 in). They are black, with the pronotum greenish bronze and the elytra and legs occasionally reddish brown. The scutellum is clothed with yellow or flavescent scales and the elytra have four longitudinal bands of scales of the same hue situated in the intervals and the two lateral ones coalescing a little past the median part. The edge of the propygidium is clothed with yellow, round scales and the pygidium has a velvety black coating, as well as a fine line of yellow scales at the apex. The abdomen is densely scaly.
