= Heterochelus ictericus =

Scientific classification
- Kingdom: Animalia
- Phylum: Arthropoda
- Class: Insecta
- Order: Coleoptera
- Suborder: Polyphaga
- Infraorder: Scarabaeiformia
- Family: Scarabaeidae
- Genus: Heterochelus
- Species: H. ictericus

Binomial name
- Heterochelus ictericus Péringuey, 1902

Species of beetle

Heterochelus ictericus is a species of beetle of the family Scarabaeidae. It is found in South Africa (Eastern Cape, Western Cape).

== Description ==
Adults reach a length of about 6.25 mm (0.246 in). They are black, with the elytra and legs rufescent. The latter are clothed with greenish-yellow scales. The head and pronotum are clothed with flavous or yellow hairs, and the latter has a narrow band of elongate yellow scales along the base, which fill also the posterior part of the median groove. The scutellum is densely scaly. The elytra are entirely clothed with contiguous round yellow scales, and have two very feebly raised costae on each side, each with a series of remote, somewhat squamulose, very short, whitish setae. The propygidium, pygidium and sides of the abdomen are clothed with closely set, round, yellow scales.
