= Heterochelus gonager =

Scientific classification
- Kingdom: Animalia
- Phylum: Arthropoda
- Clade: Pancrustacea
- Class: Insecta
- Order: Coleoptera
- Suborder: Polyphaga
- Infraorder: Scarabaeiformia
- Family: Scarabaeidae
- Genus: Heterochelus
- Species: H. gonager

Binomial name
- Heterochelus gonager (Fabricius, 1781)

Synonyms
- Melolontha gonagra Fabricius, 1781; Heterochelus testaceipennis Blanchard, 1850; Heterochelus longipes Burmeister, 1844

Species of beetle

Heterochelus gonager is a species of beetle of the family Scarabaeidae. It is found in South Africa (Western Cape).

== Description ==
Adults reach a length of about 6–6.5 mm (0.24–0.26 in). The head, pronotum and underside are black, although the abdomen is sometimes dark brown. The elytra are dark brown, densely covered with small, short oval, yellow scales. The pronotum has similar scales, but these are less numerous. Furthmore, there are long, yellow, stiff hairs on the sides.
