= Streptomyces kebangsaanensis =

Scientific classification
- Domain: Bacteria
- Kingdom: Bacillati
- Phylum: Actinomycetota
- Class: Actinomycetia
- Order: Streptomycetales
- Family: Streptomycetaceae
- Genus: Streptomyces
- Species: S. kebangsaanensis

Binomial name
- Streptomyces kebangsaanensis Mohd et al. 2013

Type strain
- DSM 42048, NRRL B-24860, SUK12

Species of bacterium

Streptomyces kebangsaanensis is a bacterium species from the genus of Streptomyces which has been isolated from the plant Portulaca oleracea in the Nenasi Reserve Forest in Pahang in Malaysia. Streptomyces kebangsaanensis produces the antibiotic tubermycin B.

== See also ==
- List of Streptomyces species
