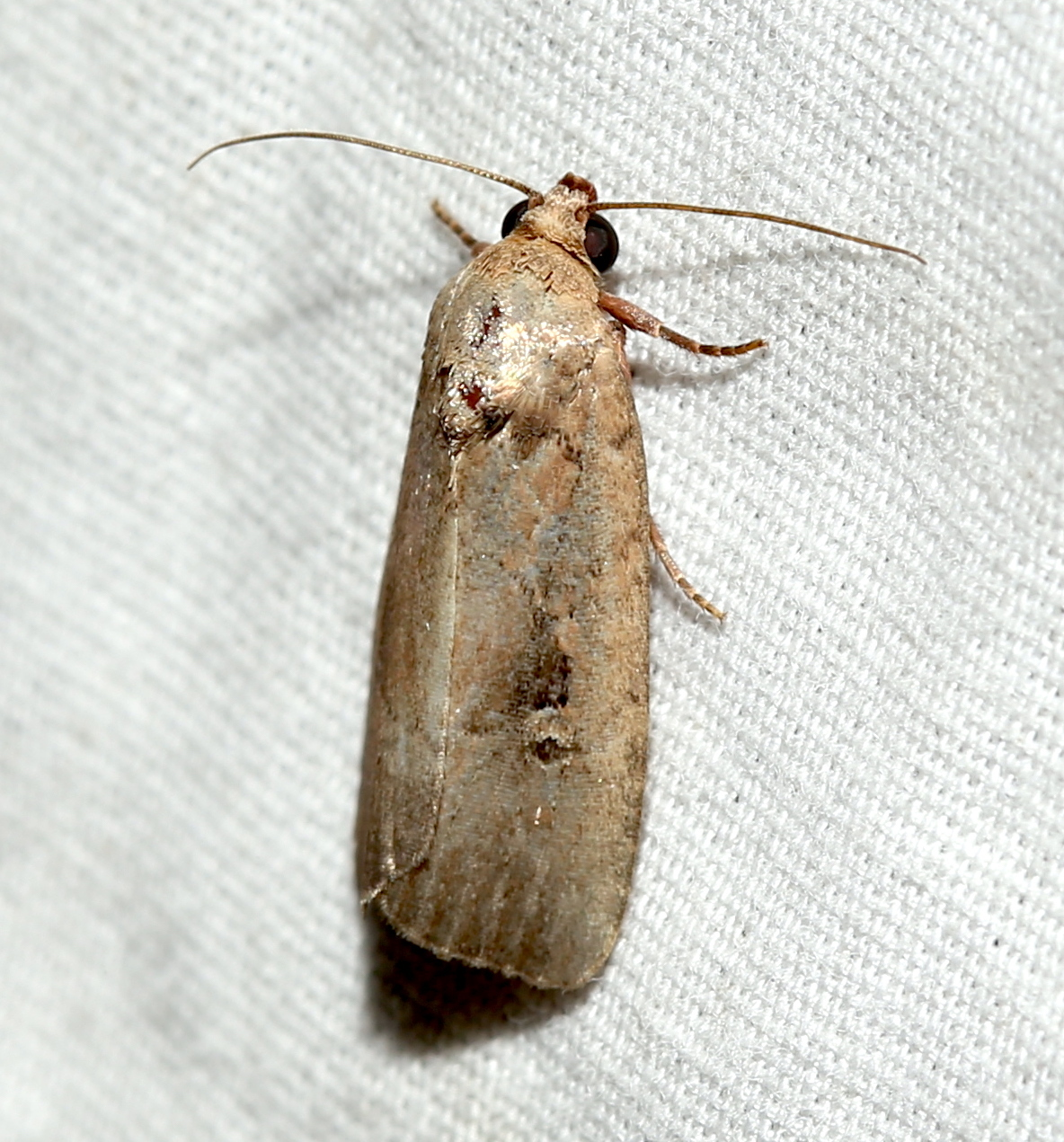

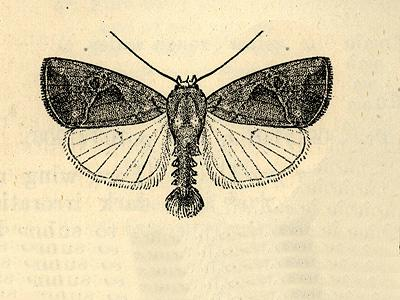

Scientific classification
- Kingdom: Animalia
- Phylum: Arthropoda
- Class: Insecta
- Order: Lepidoptera
- Superfamily: Noctuoidea
- Family: Noctuidae
- Genus: Elaphria
- Species: E. nucicolora

Binomial name
- Elaphria nucicolora (Guenée, 1852)

Synonyms
- Monodes nucicolora Guenée, 1852; Laphygma unisignata Walker, 1856; Caradrina clara Harvey, 1878; Hadena paginata Morrison, 1875; Elaphria paginata (Morrison, 1875); Galgula contraria Herrich-Schäffer, 1868; Elaphria phalega Schaus 1940

= Elaphria nucicolora =

Species of moth

Elaphria nucicolora, the sugarcane midget, is a moth of the family Noctuidae. The species was first described by Achille Guenée in 1852. It is found from the south-eastern United States (Florida to North Carolina, west to Texas), through Guadeloupe, Jamaica and Puerto Rico to tropical South America (Peru and French Guiana). It is also present on the Hawaiian islands of Oahu, Maui and Hawaii.

The wingspan is about 21 mm. Adults are on wing from June to November in Georgia and may be present year round in Florida and the tropics.

Larvae have been recorded feeding on watermelon, Emilia flammea, Euphorbia hirta, Portulaca oleracea, Synedrella nodiflora as well as sugarcane.
