= Elaphria guttula =

Scientific classification
- Domain: Eukaryota
- Kingdom: Animalia
- Phylum: Arthropoda
- Class: Insecta
- Order: Lepidoptera
- Superfamily: Noctuoidea
- Family: Noctuidae
- Genus: Elaphria
- Species: E. guttula

Binomial name
- Elaphria guttula (Herrich-Schäffer, 1868)

Synonyms
- Celaeno guttula Herrich-Schäffer, 1868

Species of moth

Elaphria guttula is a moth of the family Noctuidae. It is found on the Antilles.

== Taxonomy ==
The species was incorrectly synonymized with Elaphria agrotina for some time.
