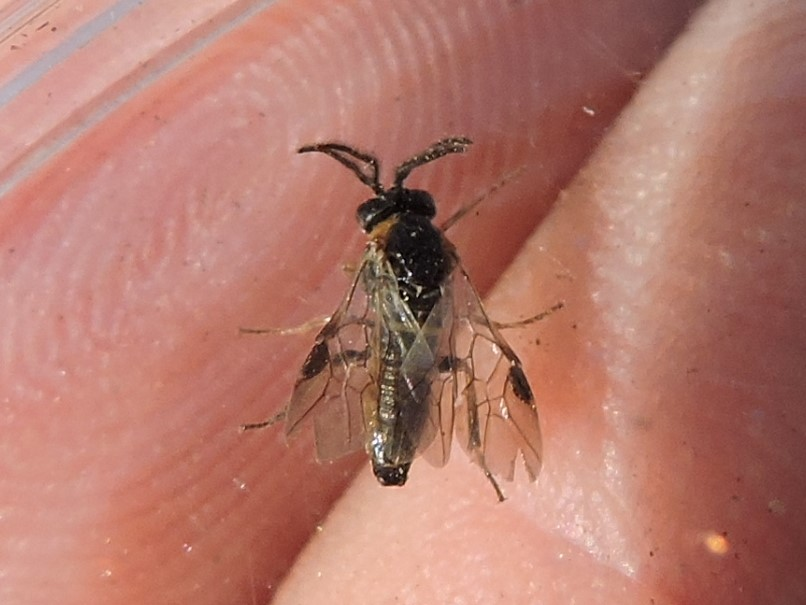

Scientific classification
- Domain: Eukaryota
- Kingdom: Animalia
- Phylum: Arthropoda
- Class: Insecta
- Order: Hymenoptera
- Suborder: Symphyta
- Family: Argidae
- Genus: Schizocerella
- Species: S. pilicornis

Binomial name
- Schizocerella pilicornis (Holmgren)

= Schizocerella pilicornis =

Species of sawfly

Schizocerella pilicornis, commonly known as the purslane sawfly or portulaca sawfly, is a species of sawfly in the family Argidae. The larva is a leaf miner on Common Purslane.
