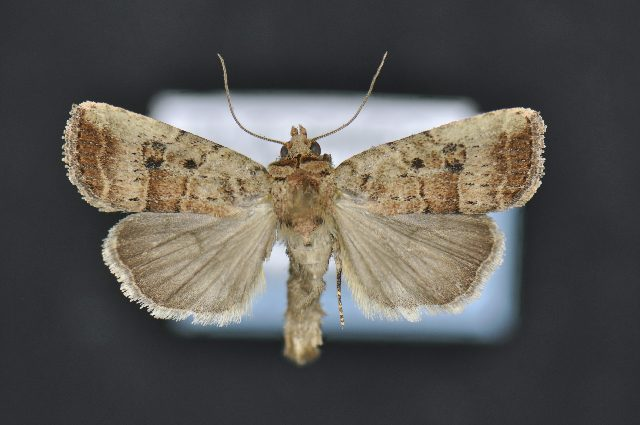

Scientific classification
- Kingdom: Animalia
- Phylum: Arthropoda
- Clade: Pancrustacea
- Class: Insecta
- Order: Lepidoptera
- Superfamily: Noctuoidea
- Family: Noctuidae
- Genus: Elaphria
- Species: E. fuscimacula

Binomial name
- Elaphria fuscimacula (Grote, 1881)

= Elaphria fuscimacula =

Species of moth

Elaphria fuscimacula is a species of cutworm or dart moth in the family Noctuidae. It is found in North America.
