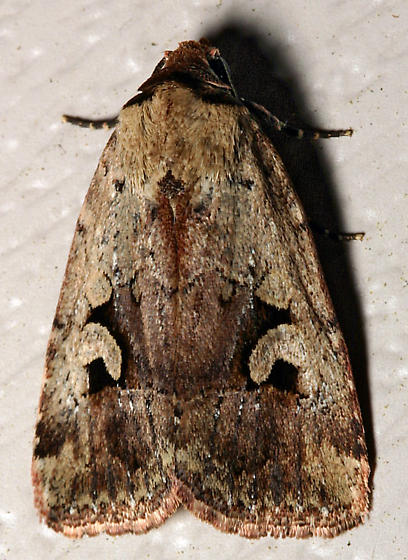

Scientific classification
- Kingdom: Animalia
- Phylum: Arthropoda
- Class: Insecta
- Order: Lepidoptera
- Superfamily: Noctuoidea
- Family: Noctuidae
- Genus: Elaphria
- Species: E. festivoides

Binomial name
- Elaphria festivoides (Guenée, 1852)

Synonyms
- Celaena festivoides Guenée, 1852; Erastria varia Walker, [1858]; Elaphria cephalica (Butler, 1891); Elaphria albovariegata Strand, 1915

= Elaphria festivoides =

Species of moth

The festive midget (Elaphria festivoides) is a species of moth of the family Noctuidae. It is found in eastern North America.

Elaphria alapallida was split from Elaphria festivoides by Pogue and Sullivan in 2003. All specimens of E. festivoides previously collected in Canada have turned out to be the new species alapallida, so festivoides is probably not present in Canada.

The wingspan is 21–28 mm. Adults are on wing from April to July. There are at least two generations per year.

Larvae have been reared on Acer negundo.
