= Elaphria cyanympha =

Scientific classification
- Domain: Eukaryota
- Kingdom: Animalia
- Phylum: Arthropoda
- Class: Insecta
- Order: Lepidoptera
- Superfamily: Noctuoidea
- Family: Noctuidae
- Tribe: Elaphriini
- Genus: Elaphria
- Species: E. cyanympha

Binomial name
- Elaphria cyanympha (Ferguson, 1989)

Species of moth

Elaphria cyanympha is a species of cutworm or dart moth in the family Noctuidae.

The MONA or Hodges number for Elaphria cyanympha is 9297.2.
