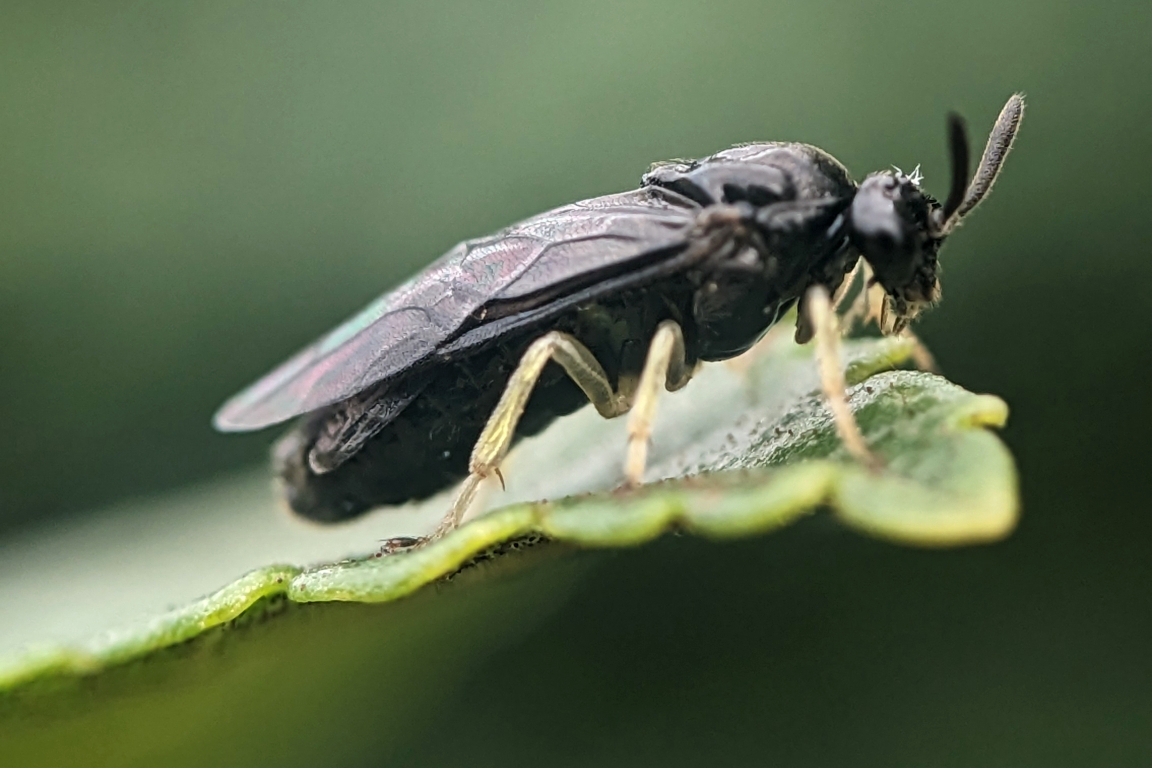
- Adult
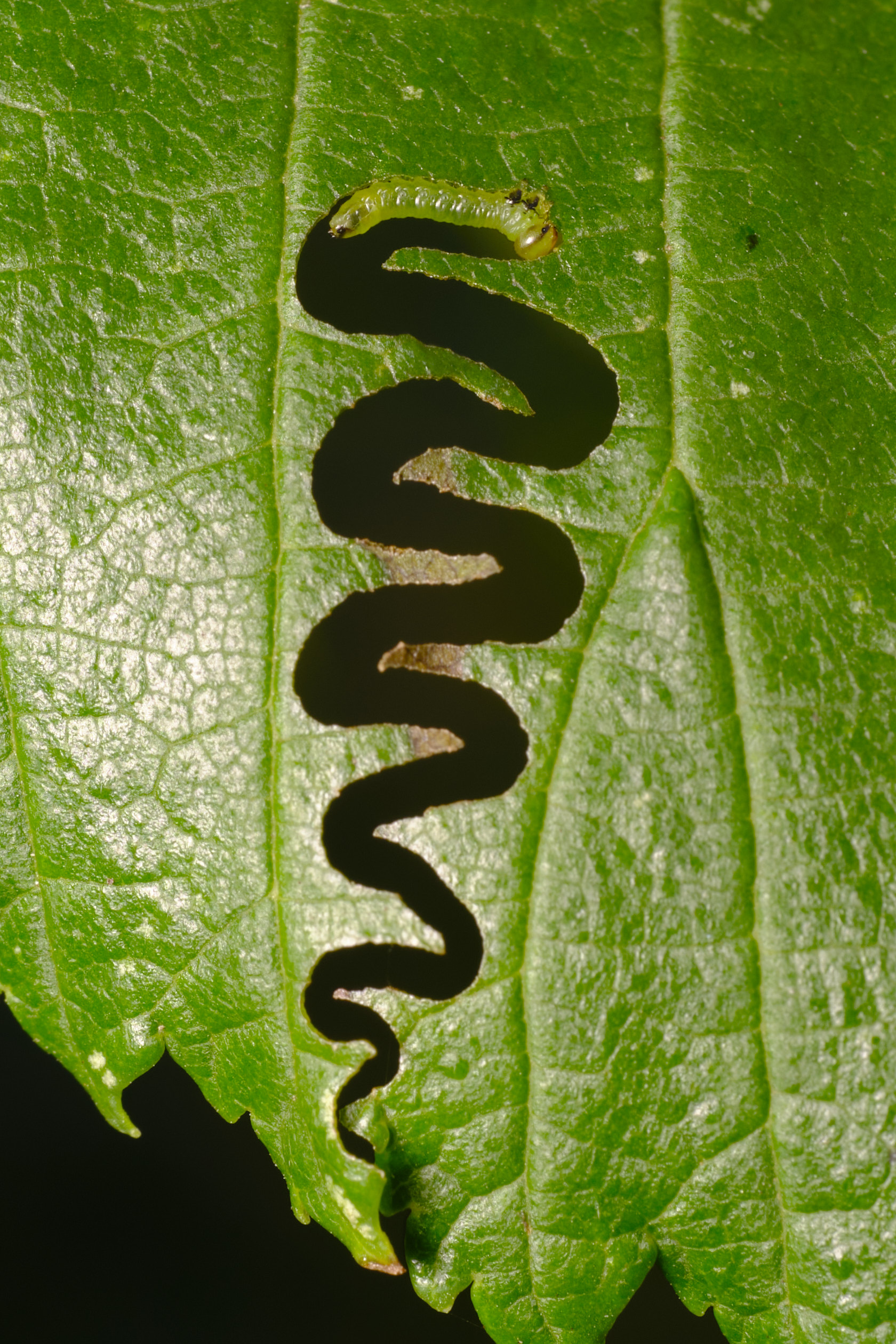
- Larva and larval gallery

Scientific classification
- Kingdom: Animalia
- Phylum: Arthropoda
- Class: Insecta
- Order: Hymenoptera
- Suborder: Symphyta
- Family: Argidae
- Genus: Aproceros
- Species: A. leucopoda

Binomial name
- Aproceros leucopoda Takeuchi, 1939

= Aproceros leucopoda =

Species of insect

Aproceros leucopoda, the elm zigzag sawfly, is a species of sawfly in the family Argidae native to eastern Asia in China and Japan. It is an invasive species in Europe since 2003, and North America since 2020.

The larva is green, around 4 mm long at first, growing to 10 mm long when full grown, and feeds on elm (Ulmus) leaves. At first it eats a very distinctive zig-zag shaped cut into the leaves, from which the species' English name derives. As the larva grows over its 4–7 instars, the feeding trace becomes less regular and less easily distinguished from other elm leaf feeding insects. The larva completes its growth in 2–3 weeks, then produces a transparent lattice-like cocoon on the underside of an elm leaf, in which it pupates. The pupa is also green, around 8 mm long. The adult hatches out after 4–7 days; it is a small black sawfly, 6–10 mm long, with pale legs. There are several generations in a year; the final generation of the autumn produces a thicker, more solid cocoon; this falls with the autumn leaves, with the insect overwintering as a pupa in the leaf litter to emerge as adults the following spring.

As an invasive species, it was first found in Europe in 2003, with the first records in Poland and Hungary; it spread westwards from there, reaching southeastern England in 2017. The first record in North America was in Quebec in 2020, and it has subsequently spread to several states in the United States. It can cause severe defoliation of elms, which can lead to their decline and death, particularly if other diseases are enabled to attack due to the tree's weakened status.
