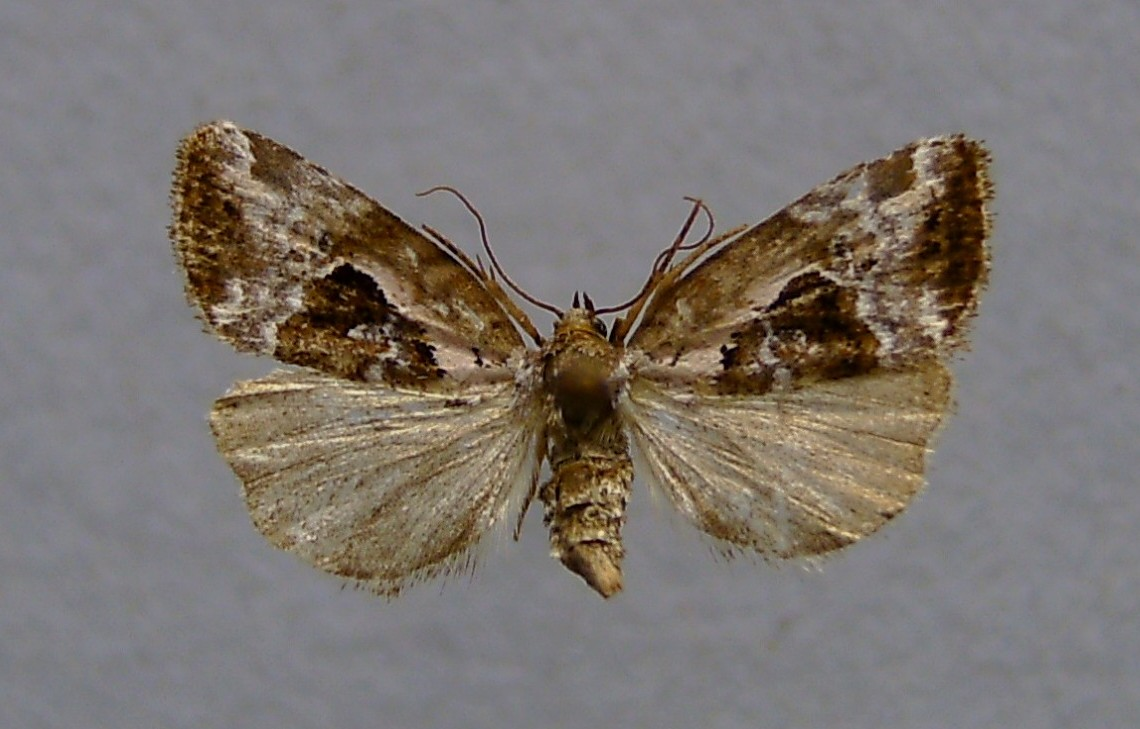
- Elaphria venustula

Scientific classification
- Kingdom: Animalia
- Phylum: Arthropoda
- Clade: Pancrustacea
- Class: Insecta
- Order: Lepidoptera
- Superfamily: Noctuoidea
- Family: Noctuidae
- Tribe: Elaphriini
- Genus: Elaphria; Hübner, 1818

= Elaphria =

Genus of moths

Elaphria is a genus of moths of the family Noctuidae. The genus was erected by Jacob Hübner in 1818.

== Species ==
- Elaphria acaste (Herrich-Schäffer, [1869])
- Elaphria agrotina (Guenée, 1852)
- Elaphria agyra (H. Druce, 1890)
- Elaphria alapallida Pogue & Sullivan, 2003
- Elaphria albiviata (Hampson, 1909)
- Elaphria algama (Schaus, 1904)
- Elaphria andersoni Schaus, 1940
- Elaphria antica (Walker, [1857])
- Elaphria aphronistes (Dyar, 1920)
- Elaphria apicalis (Schaus, 1898)
- Elaphria atrisecta (Hampson, 1909)
- Elaphria atrisigna (Hampson, 1909)
- Elaphria barbarossa (Hampson, 1909)
- Elaphria basistigma (Walker, 1858)
- Elaphria bastula (Schaus, 1906)
- Elaphria bertha (Schaus, 1898)
- Elaphria bogotana (Felder & Rogenhofer, 1874)
- Elaphria bucephalina (Mabille, 1885)
- Elaphria cadema (Schaus, 1898)
- Elaphria calopistrica (Hampson, 1909)
- Elaphria castrensis (Schaus, 1904)
- Elaphria cenicienta (Dognin, 1897)
- Elaphria chalcedonia (Hübner, [1808])
- Elaphria chionopsis (H. Druce, 1908)
- Elaphria chlorozona (E. D. Jones, 1908)
- Elaphria chulumaniensis (Köhler, 1968)
- Elaphria cognata (Schaus, 1911)
- Elaphria cohaerens (Schaus, 1911)
- Elaphria commacosta (Dyar, 1914)
- Elaphria conjugata (Moore, 1881)
- Elaphria convexa (Forbes, 1944)
- Elaphria cornutinus Saluke & Pogue, 2000
- Elaphria costagna (Schaus, 1904)
- Elaphria costipuncta (Schaus, 1904)
- Elaphria cyanympha (Ferguson, [1989])
- Elaphria delenifica (Schaus, 1911)
- Elaphria deliriosa (Walker, 1857)
- Elaphria deltoides (Möschler, 1880)
- Elaphria devara (H. Druce, 1898)
- Elaphria discisigna (Hampson, 1914)
- Elaphria ditrigona (E. D. Jones, 1908)
- Elaphria editha (Schaus, 1898)
- Elaphria encantada Hayes, 1975
- Elaphria exesa (Guenée, 1852)
- Elaphria festivoides (Guenée, 1852)
- Elaphria fissistigma (Hampson, 1898)
- Elaphria flaviorbis (Dognin, 1907)
- Elaphria fuscimacula (Grote, 1881)
- Elaphria georgei (Moore & Rawson, 1939)
- Elaphria goyensis (Hampson, 1918)
- Elaphria grata Hübner, 1818
- Elaphria guttula (Herrich-Schäffer, 1868)
- Elaphria haemassa (Hampson, 1909)
- Elaphria hemileuca (E. D. Jones, 1908)
- Elaphria hypophaea (Hampson, 1920)
- Elaphria hyposcota (Hampson, 1905)
- Elaphria insipida (Dognin, 1897)
- Elaphria interstriata (Hampson, 1909)
- Elaphria ipsidomo (Dyar, 1914)
- Elaphria isse (Schaus, 1914)
- Elaphria ixion (Schaus, 1914)
- Elaphria jalapensis (Schaus, 1894)
- Elaphria jonea (Schaus, 1906)
- Elaphria langia (H. Druce, 1890)
- Elaphria lentilinea (Hampson, 1909)
- Elaphria leucomela (Dognin, 1907)
- Elaphria leucostigma (H. Druce, 1908)
- Elaphria lithodia (Schaus, 1904)
- Elaphria lithotela (Dyar, 1914)
- Elaphria lucens (Schaus, 1911)
- Elaphria malaca (Schaus, 1902)
- Elaphria marmorata (Schaus, 1894)
- Elaphria mastera (Schaus, 1904)
- Elaphria medioclara (Schaus, 1911)
- Elaphria melanodonta (Dognin, 1914)
- Elaphria mesoleuca (Dognin, 1914)
- Elaphria mesomela (Dognin, 1907)
- Elaphria micromma (Dyar, 1914)
- Elaphria miochroa (E. D. Jones, 1908)
- Elaphria monyma (H. Druce, 1889)
- Elaphria niveopis (Dyar, 1912)
- Elaphria niveplaga (Schaus, 1898)
- Elaphria nucicolora (Guenée, 1852)
- Elaphria obliquirena (Hampson, 1909)
- Elaphria obscura (Schaus, 1906)
- Elaphria olivescens (Dogin, 1916)
- Elaphria optata (Schaus, 1911)
- Elaphria orbiculata (Schaus, 1898)
- Elaphria pallescens (Hampson, 1909)
- Elaphria perigeana (Schaus, 1911)
- Elaphria phaeopera (Hampson, 1909)
- Elaphria phaeoplaga (E. D. Jones, 1908)
- Elaphria phlegyas (Schaus, 1914)
- Elaphria plectilis (Guenée, 1852)
- Elaphria polysticta (E. D. Jones, 1908)
- Elaphria proleuca (Hampson, 1909)
- Elaphria promiscua (Möschler, 1890)
- Elaphria pulchra (H. Druce, 1889)
- Elaphria pulida (Dognin, 1897)
- Elaphria punctula (Schaus, 1906)
- Elaphria purpusi (Draudt, 1936)
- Elaphria renipes (Schaus, 1911)
- Elaphria repanda (Schaus, 1904)
- Elaphria rubripicta (Hampson, 1909)
- Elaphria rubrisecta (Hampson, 1909)
- Elaphria sanctanna (Guenée, 1852)
- Elaphria semirufa (H. Druce, 1908)
- Elaphria stelligera (Schaus, 1894)
- Elaphria stenelea (Schaus, 1904)
- Elaphria stenonephra (Hampson, 1909)
- Elaphria streptisema (Hampson, 1914)
- Elaphria stygiata (Hampson, 1909)
- Elaphria subobliqua (Walker, 1858)
- Elaphria subrubens (Guenée, 1852)
- Elaphria targa (Schaus, 1898)
- Elaphria tenebrosa (Dognin, 190)
- Elaphria tenuifascia (Hampson, 1918)
- Elaphria thionaris (Schaus, 1904)
- Elaphria thoracica (Schaus, 1898)
- Elaphria trifissa (Hampson, 1909)
- Elaphria venustula (Hübner, 1790) – rosy marbled
- Elaphria versicolor (Grote, 1875) – variegated midget
- Elaphria villicosta (Walker, 1858)
- Elaphria virescens (Schaus, 1904)
- Elaphria vittifera (Hampson, 1909)

== Former species ==
- Elaphria ensina is now Bryolymnia ensina (Barnes, 1907)
