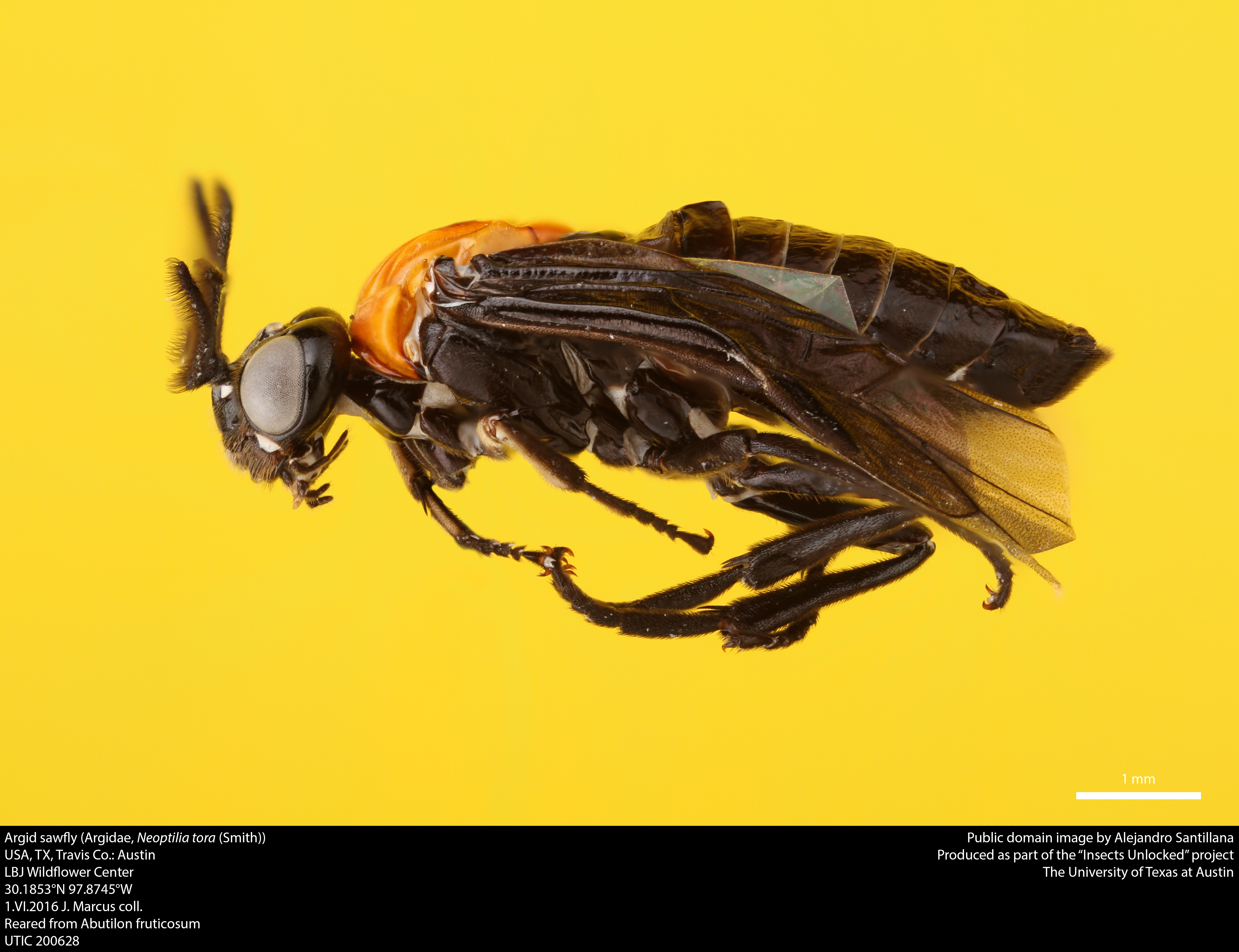
- Neoptilia

Scientific classification
- Domain: Eukaryota
- Kingdom: Animalia
- Phylum: Arthropoda
- Class: Insecta
- Order: Hymenoptera
- Suborder: Symphyta
- Superfamily: Tenthredinoidea
- Family: Argidae
- Subfamily: Sterictiphorinae

= Sterictiphorinae =

Subfamily of sawflies

Sterictiphorinae is a subfamily of argid sawflies in the family Argidae. There are more than 20 genera in Sterictiphorinae.

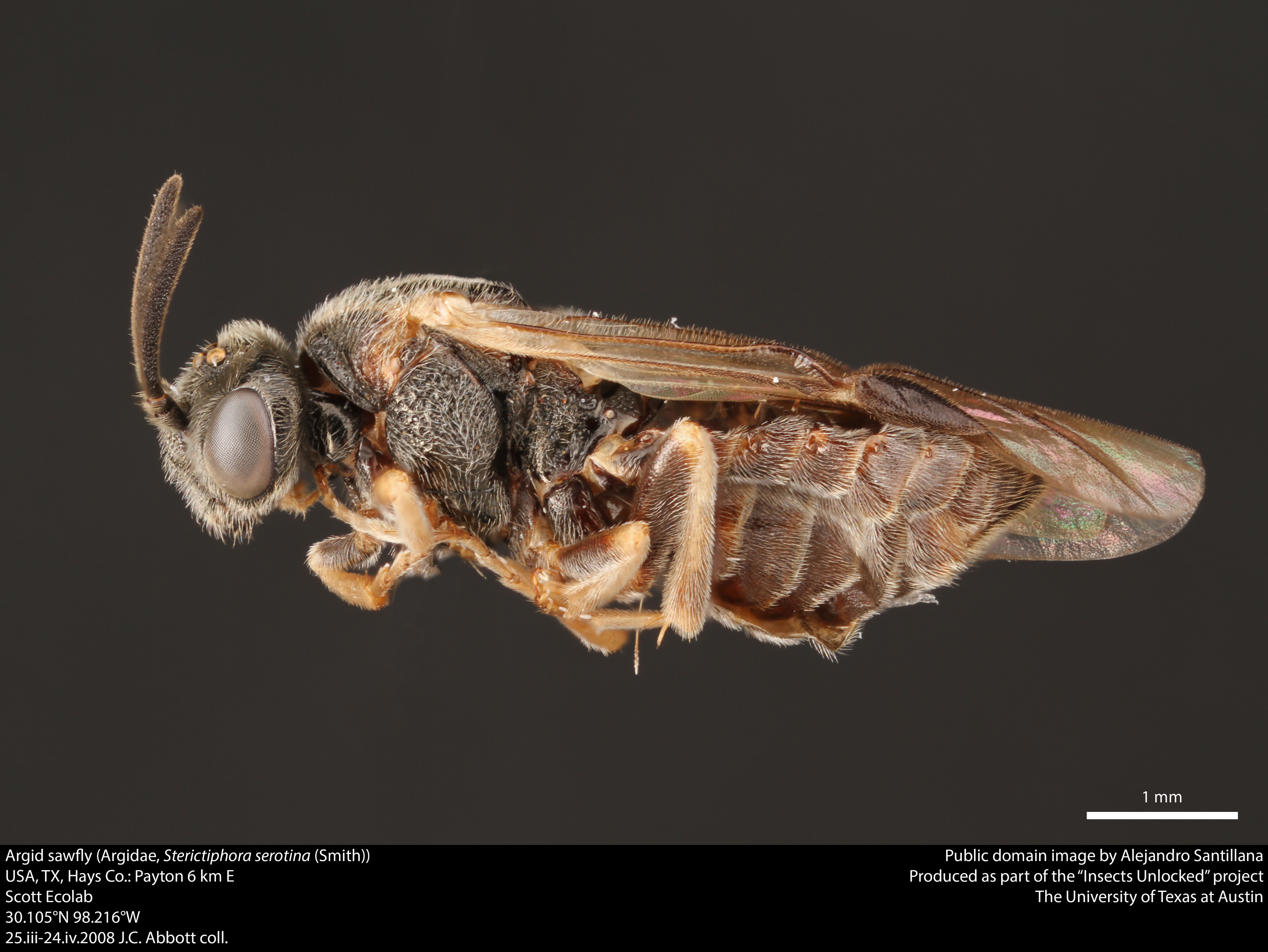
Sterictiphora serotina

== Genera ==
These 26 genera belong to the subfamily Sterictiphorinae:

- Acrogymnia Malaise, 1941
- Acrogymnidea Malaise, 1955
- Adurgoa Malaise, 1937
- Aproceros Malaise, 1931
- Aprosthema Konow, 1899
- Brachyphatnus Konow, 1906
- Didymia Lepeletier, 1825
- Duckeana Malaise, 1941
- Durgoa Malaise, 1937
- Manaos Rohwer, 1912
- Neoptilia Ashmead, 1898
- Ortasiceros Wei, 1997
- Pseudaprosthema Gussakovskij, 1935
- Ptenus Kirby, 1882
- Ptilia Lepeletier, 1825
- Schizocerella Forsius, 1927
- Sphacophilus Provancher, 1888
- Sterictiphora Billberg, 1820
- Styphelarge Benson, 1938
- Tanymeles Konow, 1906
- Trailia Cameron, 1878
- Trichorhachus Kirby, 1882
- Triptenus Malaise, 1937
- Trochophora Konow, 1905
- Yasumatsua Togashi, 1970
- Zynzus Smith, 1992
