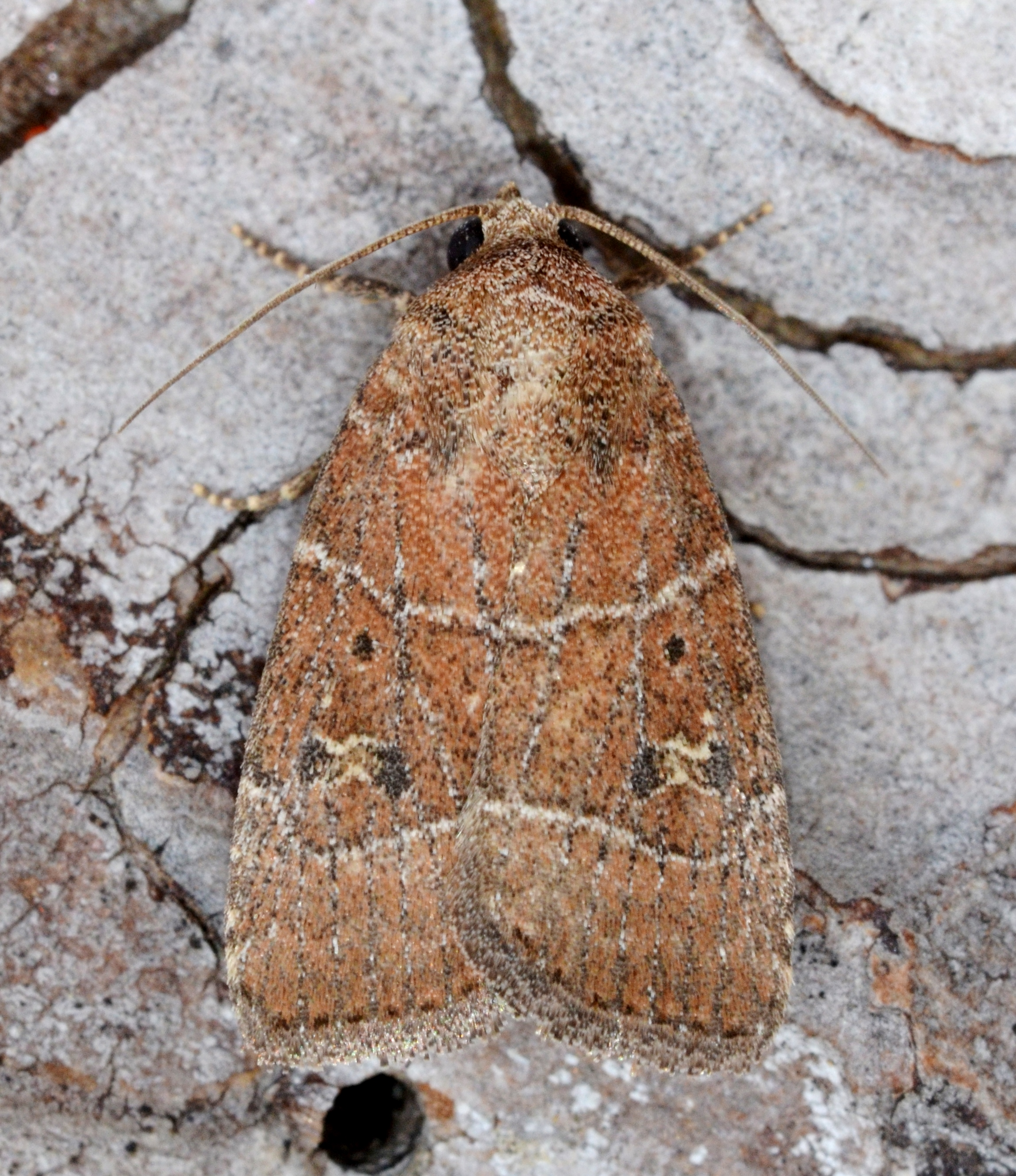

Scientific classification
- Kingdom: Animalia
- Phylum: Arthropoda
- Class: Insecta
- Order: Lepidoptera
- Superfamily: Noctuoidea
- Family: Noctuidae
- Genus: Elaphria
- Species: E. grata

Binomial name
- Elaphria grata Hübner, 1818

Synonyms
- Cosmia orina Guenée, 1852; Hadena rasilis Morrison, 1875

= Elaphria grata =

Species of moth

Elaphria grata, the grateful midget moth, is a moth of the family Noctuidae. It is found in North America, where it has been recorded from Alabama, Arkansas, Connecticut, Delaware, Florida, Georgia, Illinois, Indiana, Iowa, Kansas, Kentucky, Maine, Maryland, Massachusetts, Mississippi, Missouri, New Jersey, New York, North Carolina, Ohio, Oklahoma, Ontario, Pennsylvania, South Carolina, Tennessee, Texas, Virginia, West Virginia and Wisconsin.

The wingspan is 20–26 mm. Adults are on wing from April to October in multiple generations per year.

The larvae have been recorded feeding on forbs, Quercus species and dead leaves.
