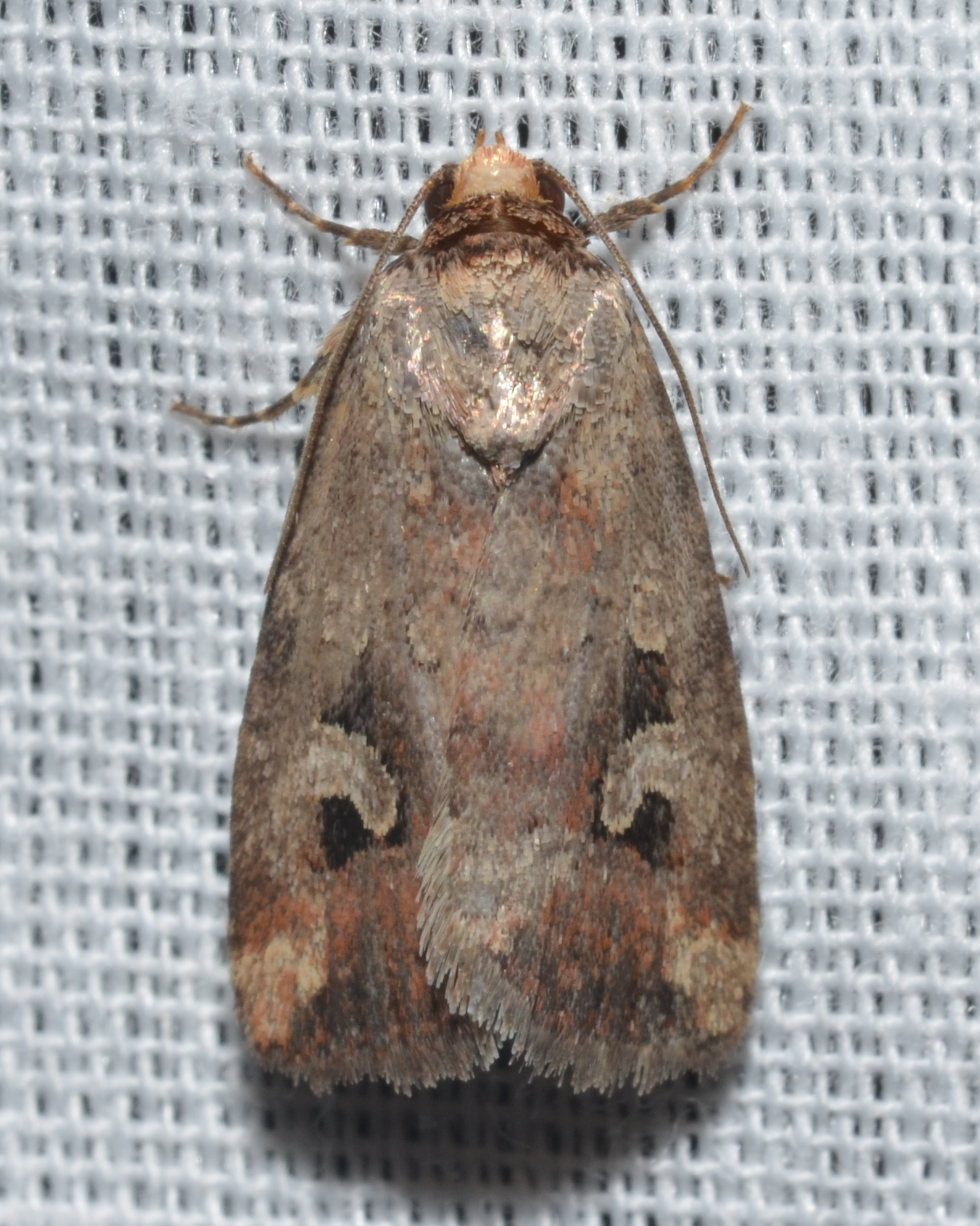

Scientific classification
- Domain: Eukaryota
- Kingdom: Animalia
- Phylum: Arthropoda
- Class: Insecta
- Order: Lepidoptera
- Superfamily: Noctuoidea
- Family: Noctuidae
- Genus: Elaphria
- Species: E. alapallida

Binomial name
- Elaphria alapallida Pogue & Sullivan, 2003

= Elaphria alapallida =

Species of moth in North America

The pale-winged midget (Elaphria alapallida) is a species of moth in the family Noctuidae. It is found across southern Canada and the northern United States.

Elaphria alapallida was split from Elaphria festivoides by Pogue and Sullivan in 2003.

The wingspan is 24–28 mm. Adults are on wing from May to July. There is one generation per year.

Larvae of E. festivoides have been reared on Acer negundo. The hostplant preferences of E. alapallida may be similar.
