= Aprosthema =

Scientific classification
- Kingdom: Animalia
- Phylum: Arthropoda
- Class: Insecta
- Order: Hymenoptera
- Suborder: Symphyta
- Family: Argidae
- Subfamily: Sterictiphorinae
- Genus: Aprosthema; Konow, 1899

Genus of sawflies

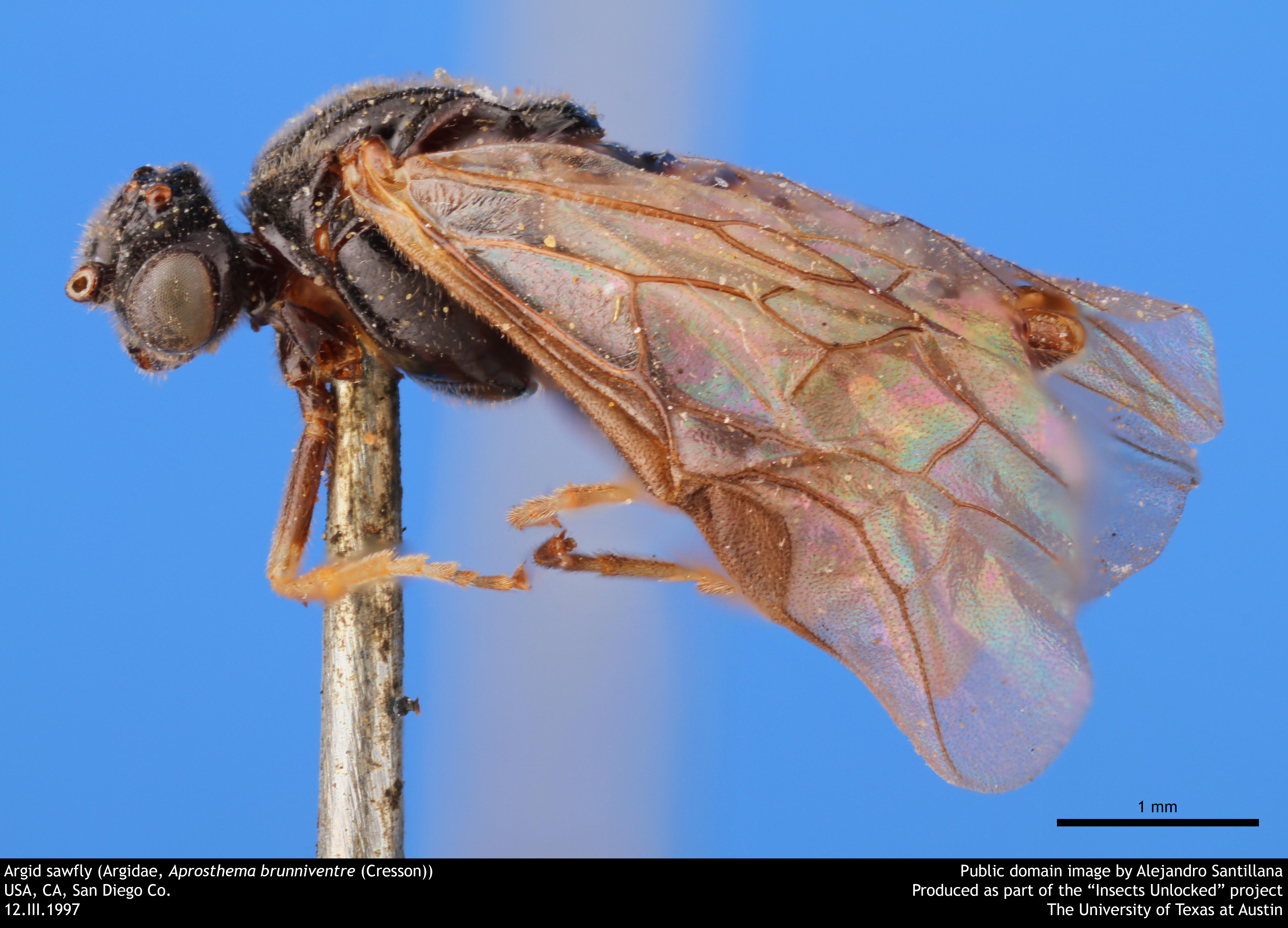
Argid sawfly (Argidae, Aprosthema brunniventre (Cresson)).

Aprosthema is a genus of insects belonging to the family Argidae.

The genus was first described by Friedrich Wilhelm Konow in 1899.

Species:

- Aprosthema austriacum
- Aprosthema bifidum
- Aprosthema brevicorne
- Aprosthema breviantennatum
- Aprosthema brunniventre
- Aprosthema brevivertexis
- Aprosthema fusicorne
- Aprosthema melanurum
- Aprosthema tardum
