= Elaphria deltoides =

Scientific classification
- Domain: Eukaryota
- Kingdom: Animalia
- Phylum: Arthropoda
- Class: Insecta
- Order: Lepidoptera
- Superfamily: Noctuoidea
- Family: Noctuidae
- Genus: Elaphria
- Species: E. deltoides

Binomial name
- Elaphria deltoides (Möschler, 1880)

Species of moth

Elaphria deltoides is a species of cutworm or dart moth in the family Noctuidae. It is found in North America.

The MONA or Hodges number for Elaphria deltoides is 9679.1.
