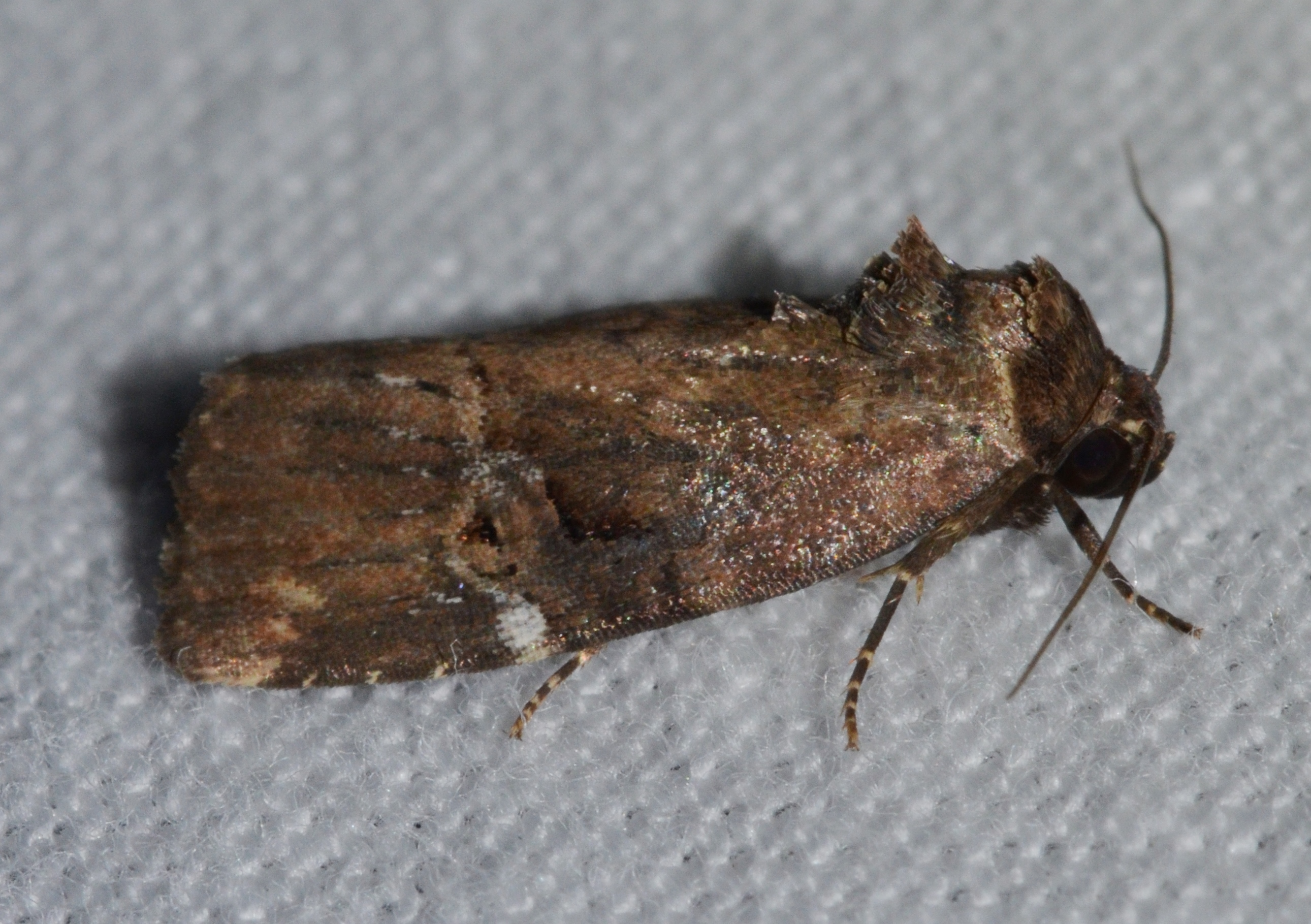

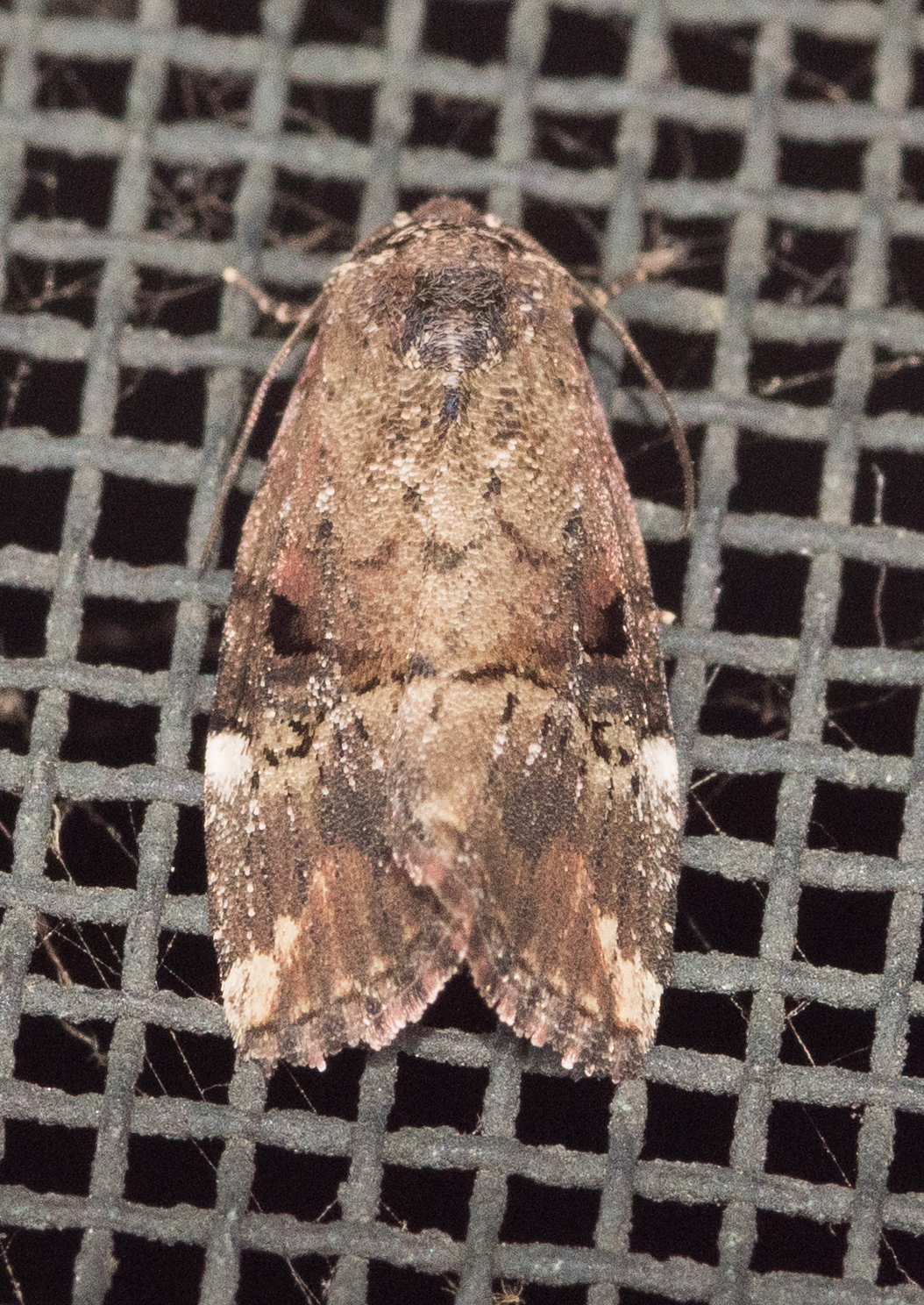

Scientific classification
- Kingdom: Animalia
- Phylum: Arthropoda
- Class: Insecta
- Order: Lepidoptera
- Superfamily: Noctuoidea
- Family: Noctuidae
- Genus: Elaphria
- Species: E. versicolor

Binomial name
- Elaphria versicolor Grote, 1875

Synonyms
- Hadena versicolor

= Elaphria versicolor =

Species of moth

Elaphria versicolor (variegated midget) is a species of moth in the family Noctuidae. It is found in north-eastern North America, including Ontario and Ohio.

This wingspan is about 22 mm. The moth flies from May to July depending on the location.

The larvae feed on balsam fir, hemlock, pine, spruce, yellow birch and white cedar.
