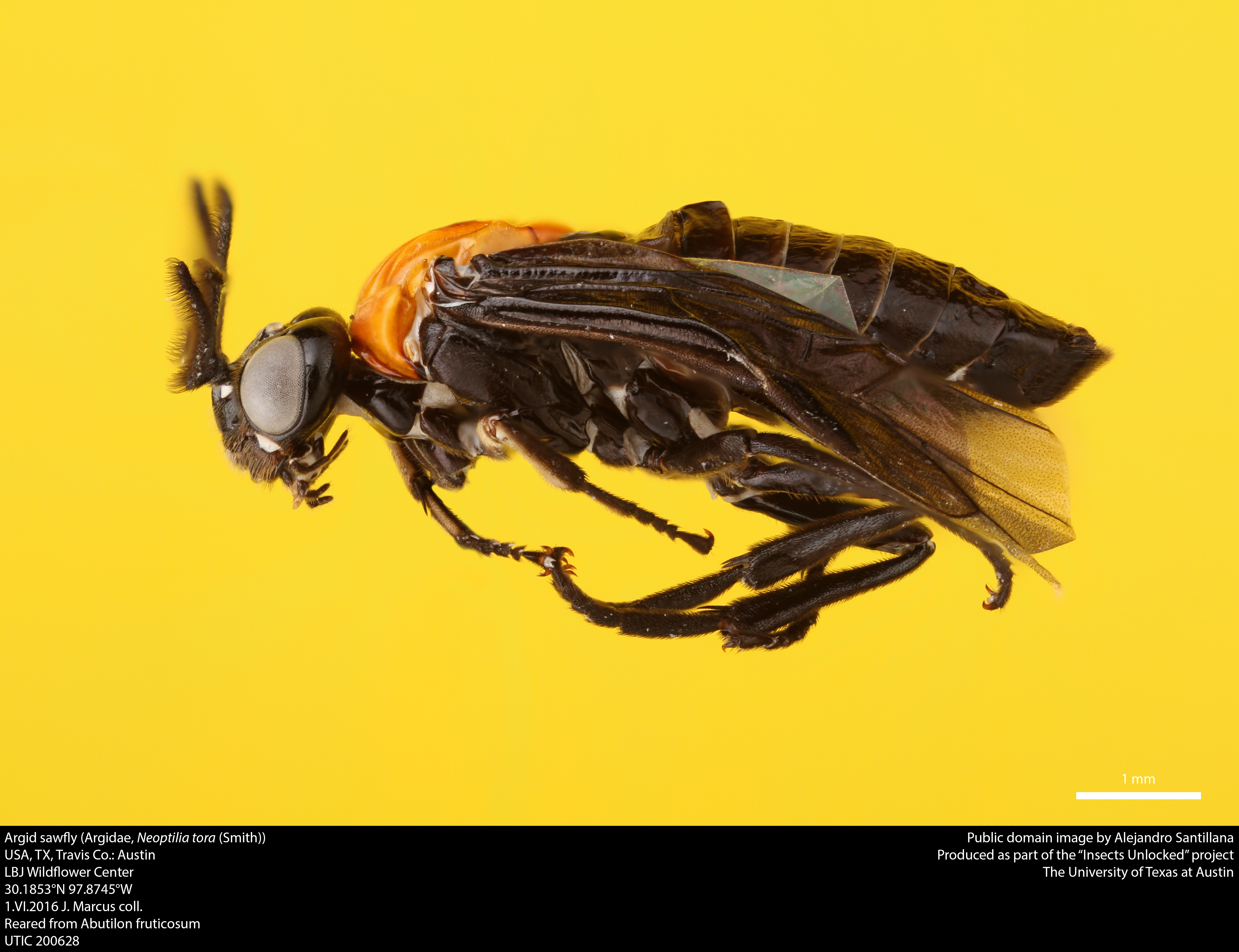

Scientific classification
- Domain: Eukaryota
- Kingdom: Animalia
- Phylum: Arthropoda
- Class: Insecta
- Order: Hymenoptera
- Suborder: Symphyta
- Family: Argidae
- Subfamily: Sterictiphorinae
- Genus: Neoptilia; Ashmead, 1898

= Neoptilia =

Genus of sawflies

Neoptilia is a genus of argid sawflies in the family Argidae. There are at least two described species in Neoptilia.

== Species ==
These two species belong to the genus Neoptilia:

- Neoptilia malvacearum Cockerell, 1894^{b} (hollyhock sawfly)
- Neoptilia tora Smith, 1971^{b} (purple sawfly)

Data sources: i = ITIS, c = Catalogue of Life, g = GBIF, b = Bugguide.net
