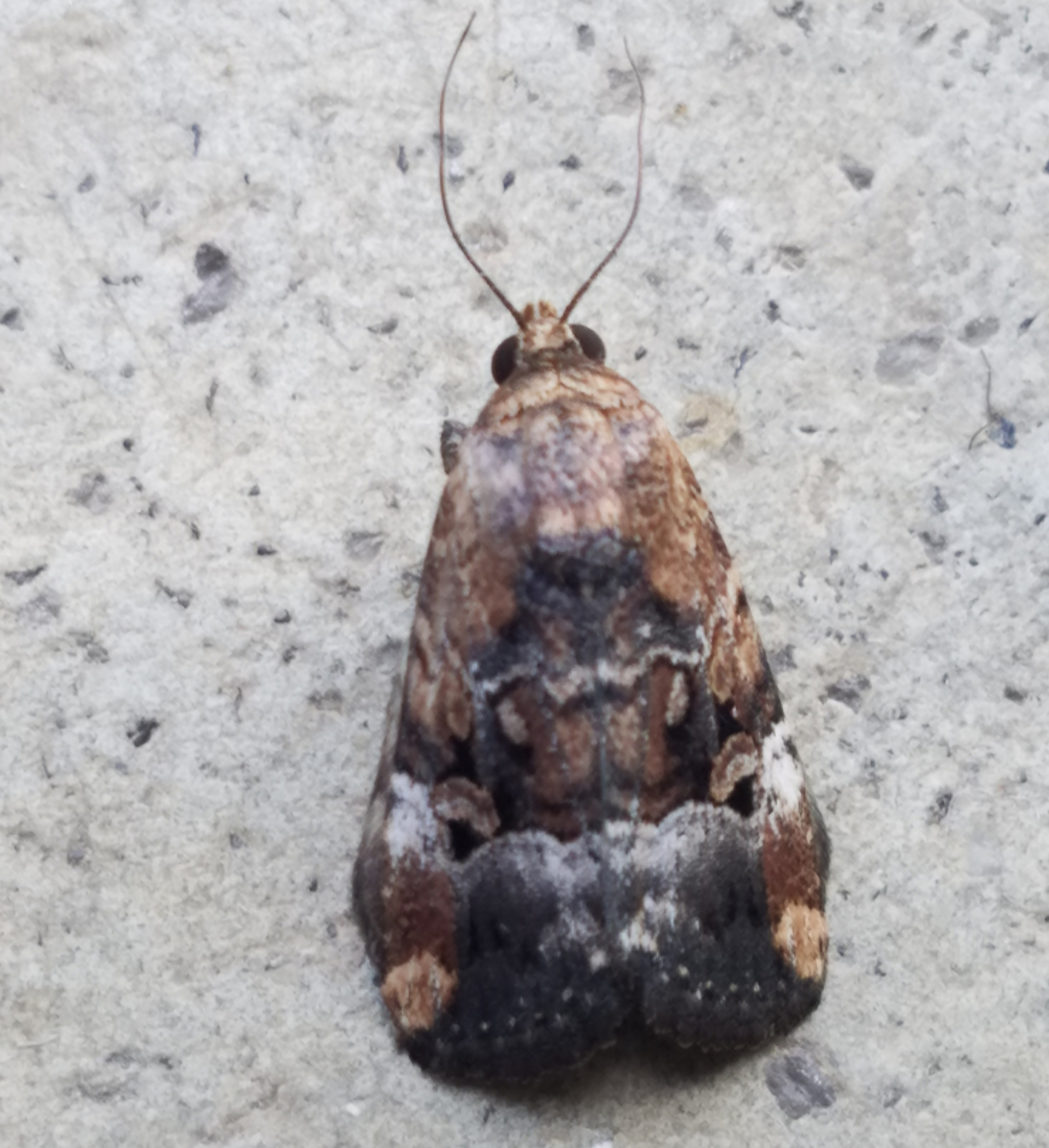
- Elaphria exesa from Alabama, U.S.

Scientific classification
- Kingdom: Animalia
- Phylum: Arthropoda
- Class: Insecta
- Order: Lepidoptera
- Superfamily: Noctuoidea
- Family: Noctuidae
- Genus: Elaphria
- Species: E. exesa

Binomial name
- Elaphria exesa (Guenée, 1852)

= Elaphria exesa =

Species of moth

Elaphria exesa, the exesa midget moth, is a species of cutworm or dart moth in the family Noctuidae. It is found in North America.

The MONA or Hodges number for Elaphria exesa is 9682.
