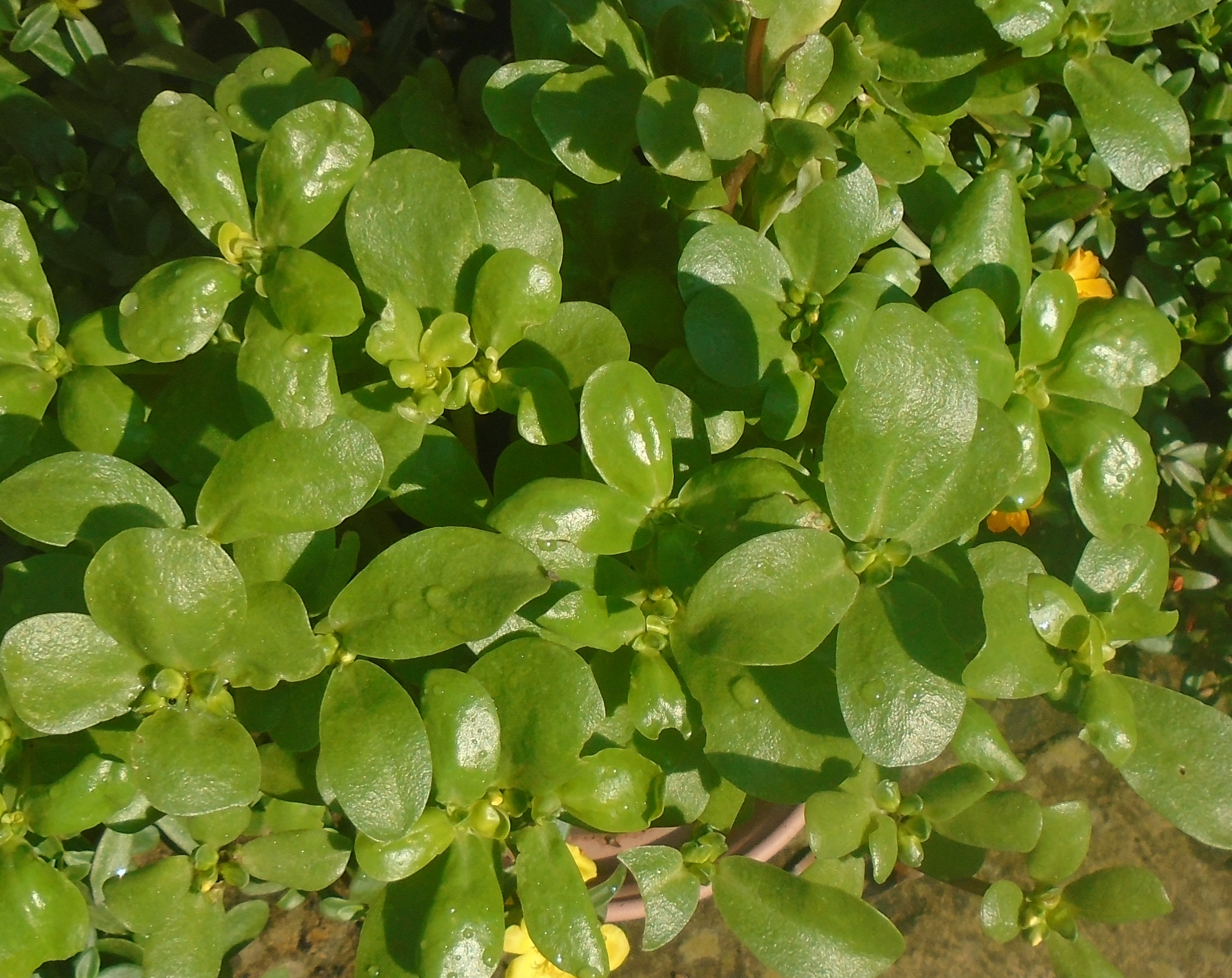

Scientific classification
- Kingdom: Plantae
- Clade: Tracheophytes
- Clade: Angiosperms
- Clade: Eudicots
- Order: Caryophyllales
- Family: Portulacaceae
- Genus: Portulaca
- Species: P. oleracea
- Subspecies: P. o. subsp. sativa

Trinomial name
- Portulaca oleracea subsp. sativa (Haw.) Celak.

Synonyms
- Portulaca sativa Haw.; Portulaca oleracea var. sativa DC.

= Portulaca oleracea subsp. sativa =

Subspecies of plant

Portulaca oleracea subsp. sativa also known as golden purslane is one of few subspecies of Portulaca oleracea (common purslane).

== Description ==
The leaves are much bigger, more yellow in colour and less succulent than other subspecies, also the stems are mostly the same colour of the leaves.
