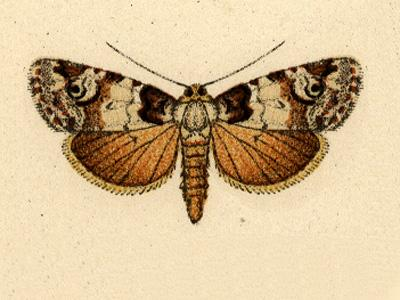

Scientific classification
- Kingdom: Animalia
- Phylum: Arthropoda
- Class: Insecta
- Order: Lepidoptera
- Superfamily: Noctuoidea
- Family: Noctuidae
- Genus: Elaphria
- Species: E. basistigma

Binomial name
- Elaphria basistigma (Walker, 1858)

Synonyms
- Erastria basistigma Walker, 1858; Monodes basistigma

= Elaphria basistigma =

Species of moth

Elaphria basistigma is a moth of the family Noctuidae. It is found on the West Indies.
