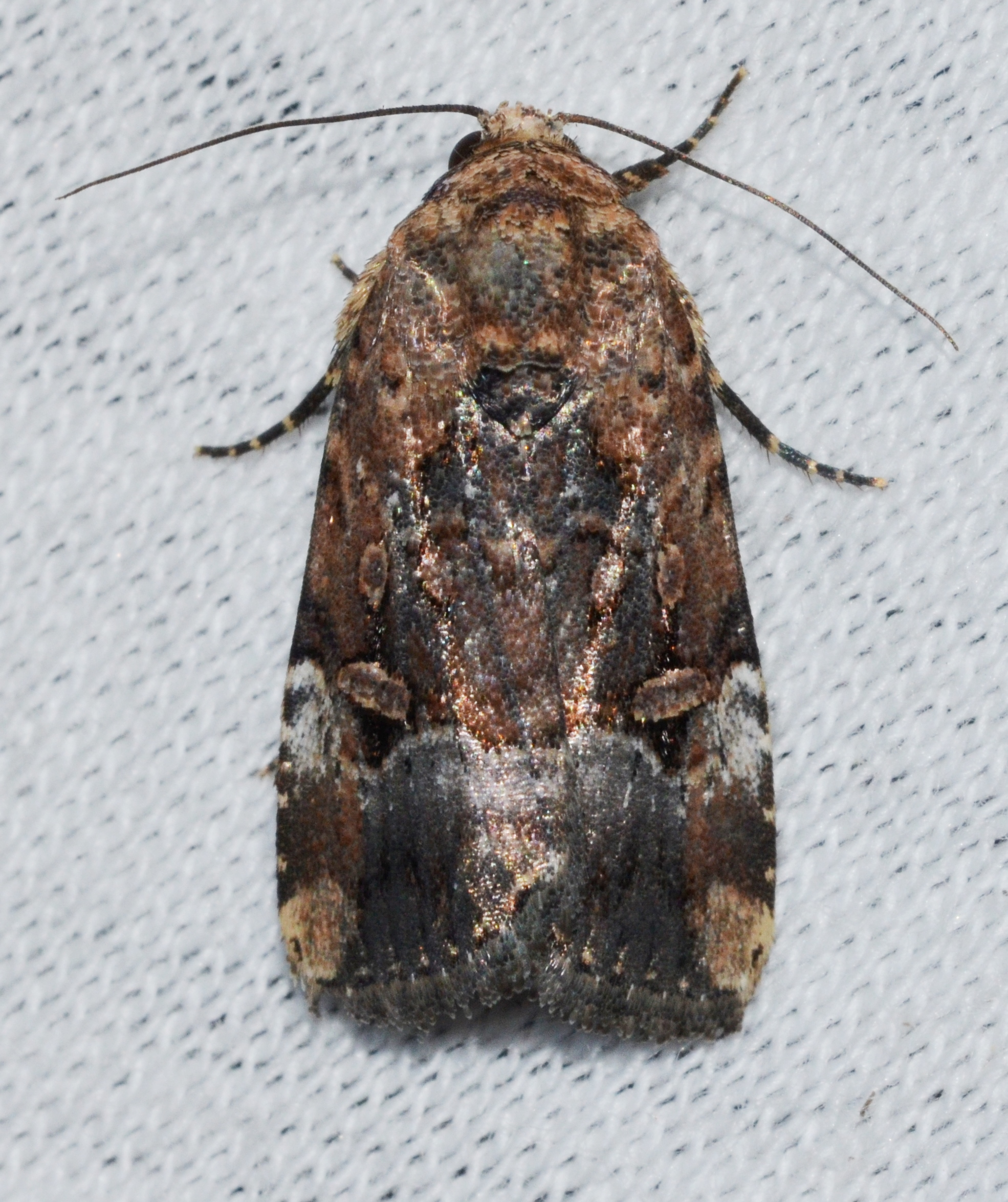

Scientific classification
- Kingdom: Animalia
- Phylum: Arthropoda
- Clade: Pancrustacea
- Class: Insecta
- Order: Lepidoptera
- Superfamily: Noctuoidea
- Family: Noctuidae
- Genus: Elaphria
- Species: E. chalcedonia

Binomial name
- Elaphria chalcedonia (Hübner, [1808])

Synonyms
- Noctua chalcedonia Hübner, 1808; Celaena arna Guenée, 1852; Celaena expuncta Walker, [1857]; Celaena irresoluta Walker, 1857; Miana vincta Walker, 1857; Hadena tracta Grote, 1874

= Elaphria chalcedonia =

Species of moth

Elaphria chalcedonia, the chalcedony midget moth, is a moth of the family Noctuidae. It is found in North America, where it has been recorded from the eastern United States, from Maine to Florida, west to Texas and north to Wisconsin. It is also found in Jamaica, Guadeloupe, Saint Martin, Puerto Rico and Central America. It was described by Jacob Hübner in 1808.

The wingspan is 24–28 mm. Adults are on wing year round in Florida and from June to September in the northern part of the range.

The larvae feed on Penstemon, Scrophularia and Mimulus species.
