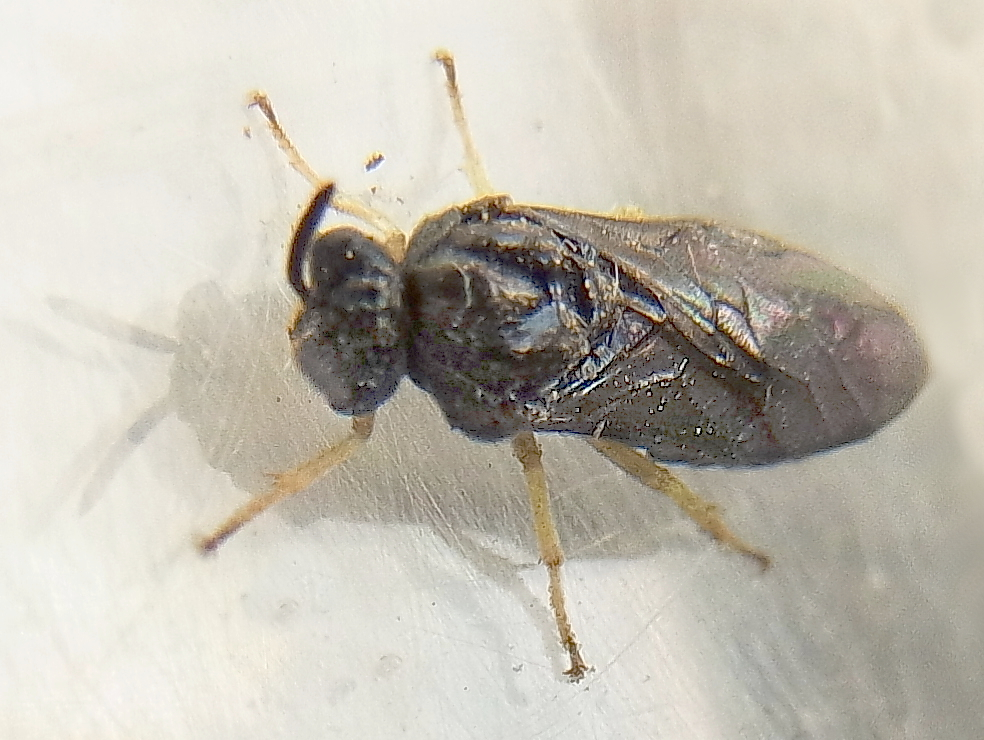
- Aproceros leucopoda

Scientific classification
- Domain: Eukaryota
- Kingdom: Animalia
- Phylum: Arthropoda
- Class: Insecta
- Order: Hymenoptera
- Suborder: Symphyta
- Family: Argidae
- Subfamily: Sterictiphorinae
- Genus: Aproceros; Malaise, 1931

= Aproceros =

Genus of sawflies

Aproceros is a genus of insects in the family Argidae. Species of this genus are native to eastern Asia with one species, the elm zigzag sawfly (Aproceros leucopoda), that has been introduced to Europe and North America.

== Species ==
There are 10 recognized species within the genus Aproceros:

- Aproceros pallidicornis (Mocsáry, 1909) – Aprosthema pallidicornis (original designation)

- Formally known as Aproceros umbricola Malaise, 1931

- Aproceros leucopoda Takeuchi, 1939 – elm zigzag sawfly
- Aproceros hakusanus Togashi, 1962
- Aproceros okutanii Togashi, 1968
- Aproceros sikkimensis Saini & Thind, 1992
- Aproceros scutellis Wei, 1998
- Aproceros distinctus Wei, 1998
- Aproceros maculatus Wei, 1998
- Aproceros antennatus Togashi, 1998
- Aproceros mikagei Togashi, 2003
