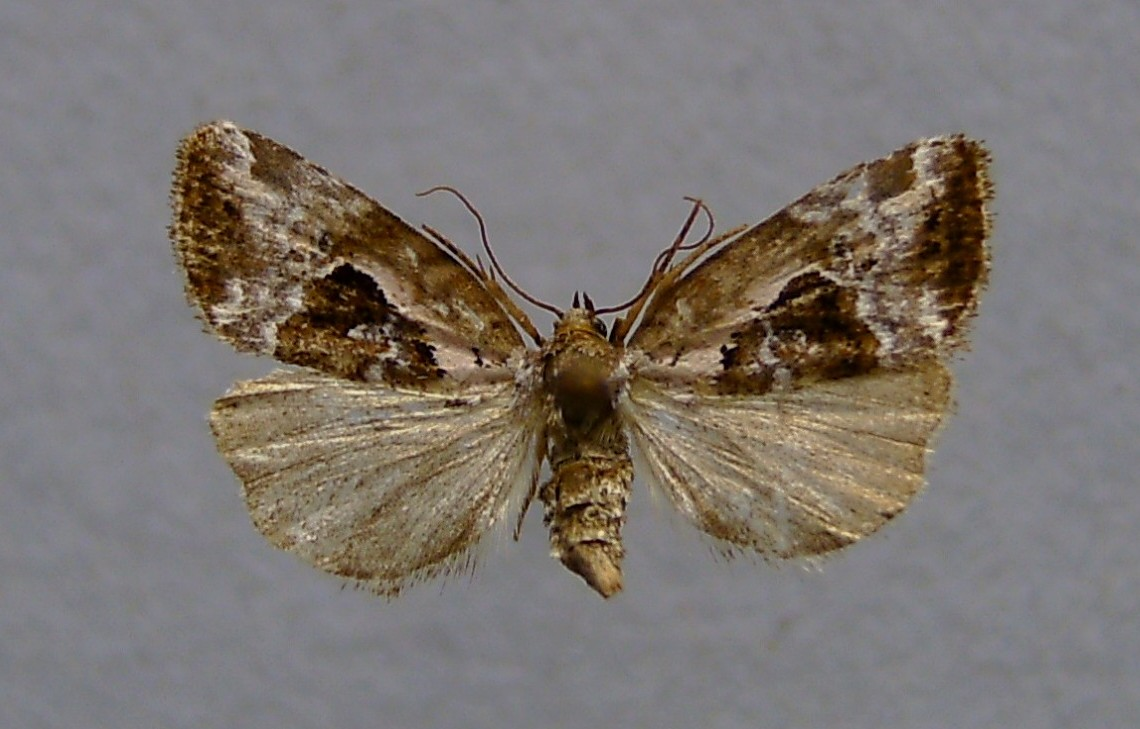

Scientific classification
- Kingdom: Animalia
- Phylum: Arthropoda
- Clade: Pancrustacea
- Class: Insecta
- Order: Lepidoptera
- Superfamily: Noctuoidea
- Family: Noctuidae
- Genus: Elaphria
- Species: E. venustula

Binomial name
- Elaphria venustula (Hübner, 1790)

Synonyms
- Phalaena Noctua venustula Hübner, 1790; Psilomonodes venustula; Pyralis hybnerana Fabricius, 1794

= Elaphria venustula =

Species of moth

Elaphria venustula (rosy marbled) is a moth of the family Noctuidae. It is found in most of Europe, except the north. In the east, the range extends through the Palearctic to the Pacific Ocean.

== Technical description and variation ==
P. venustula Hbn. (= hybnerana F.) (45 i). Forewing white, the basal half tinged with dull pink; inner and outer lines double, grey, waved, their inner and outer arms respectively thicker and duller, those enclosing the median area darker and thinner below middle, each preceded by an irregular brownish shade; a broad oblique white streak from apex, interrupting a brown praesubmarginal shade, which isagain interrupted above inner margin; submarginal line undefined except at middle where it is preceded by a brown shade containing 2 or 3 black marks the terminal area beyond it and the fringe uninterruptedly brown; claviform stigma grey edged with white; orbicular absent, its place taken by a black semicircular blotch on median vein from which black scales run down through the brown shade; reniform obscurely marked, pale grey inwardly, with some black scales externally touching outer line; hindwing whitish, tinged with brownish grey towards termen; a grey cellspot and outer line. Larva purplish brown;the dorsal line indistinctly paler; 4th segment with a pale spot at sides; head brown. The wingspan is 18–22 mm.

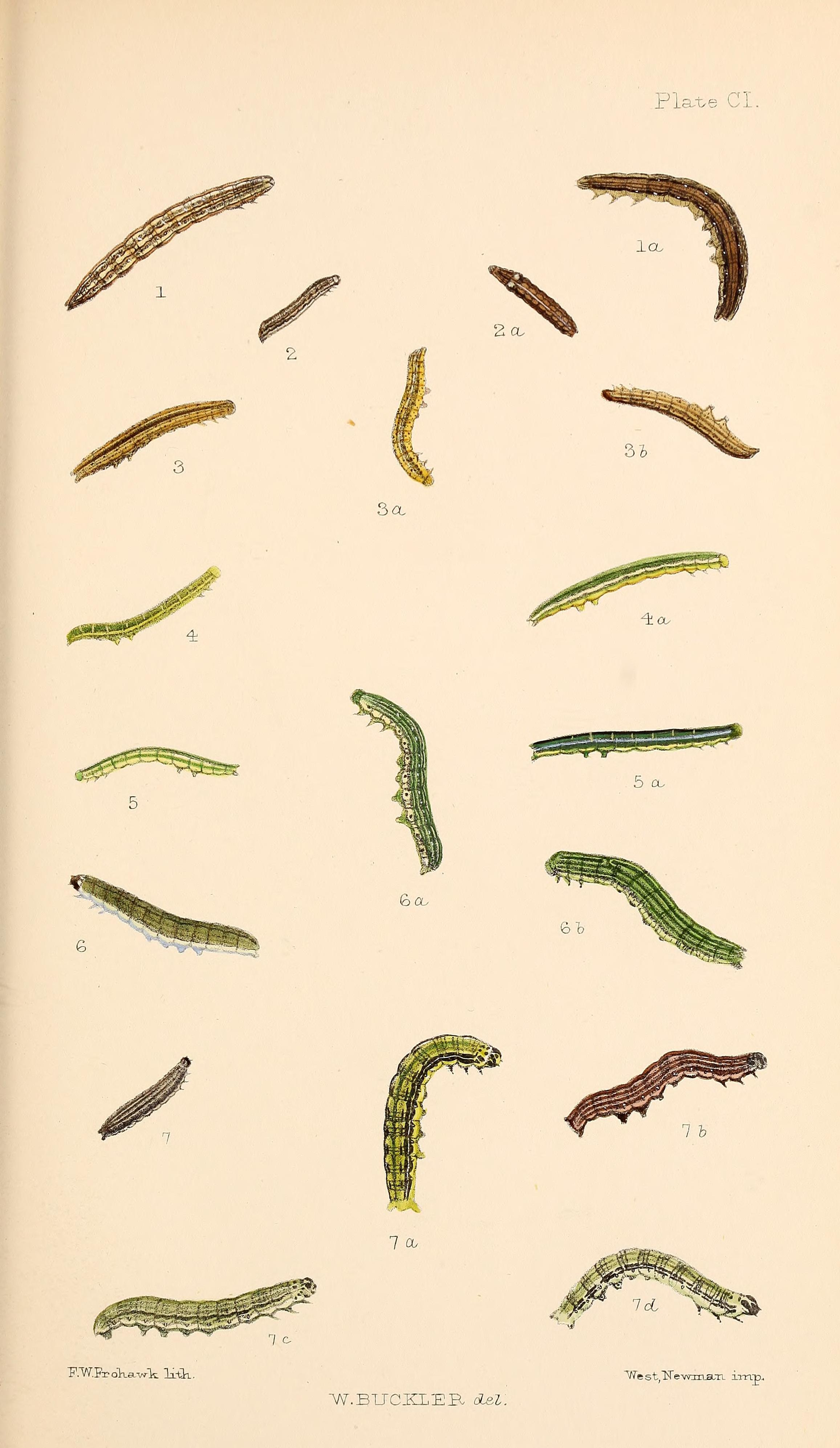
2, 2a larvae after last moult

== Biology ==
There are usually two generations per year with adults on wing from May to September. In the northern part of the range, there is only one generation, with adults on wing from June to July.

The larvae mainly feed on the flowers of Potentilla, Erica and Calluna species, but have also been recorded feeding on Genista and Rubus species. The species overwinters in the pupal stage.
