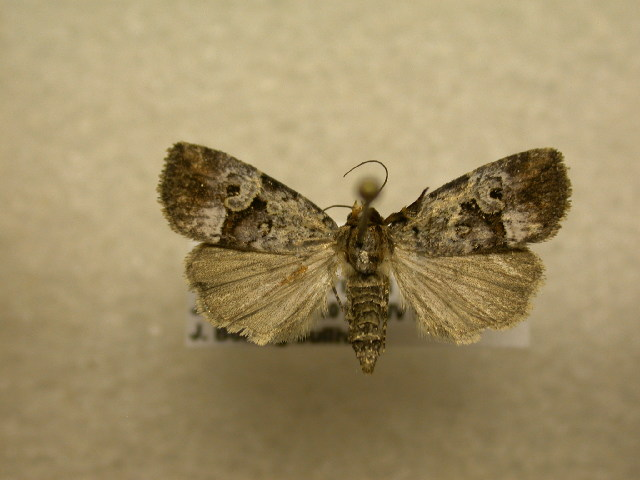

Scientific classification
- Kingdom: Animalia
- Phylum: Arthropoda
- Clade: Pancrustacea
- Class: Insecta
- Order: Lepidoptera
- Superfamily: Noctuoidea
- Family: Noctuidae
- Genus: Elaphria
- Species: E. cornutinus

Binomial name
- Elaphria cornutinus Saluke & Pogue, 2000

= Elaphria cornutinus =

Species of moth

Elaphria cornutinus is a species of moth in the family Noctuidae. It was described by Sandra V. Saluke and Michael G. Pogue in 2000 and is found in North America, where it has been recorded from south-eastern United States (Oklahoma, Arkansas, Mississippi, Missouri, Kentucky, Tennessee, Alabama, south-eastern Michigan, Ohio, and Maryland).

The length of the forewings is 9–12 mm. Adults are on wing from March to September.

The MONA or Hodges number for Elaphria cornutinus is 9681.2.
