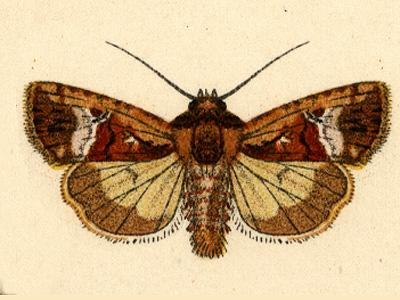

Scientific classification
- Kingdom: Animalia
- Phylum: Arthropoda
- Class: Insecta
- Order: Lepidoptera
- Superfamily: Noctuoidea
- Family: Noctuidae
- Genus: Elaphria
- Species: E. subobliqua

Binomial name
- Elaphria subobliqua (Walker, 1858)

Synonyms
- Celaena subobliqua Walker, 1858; Monodes subobliqua; Callopistria vittata Walker, 1865; Alibama mutata Möschler, 1886

= Elaphria subobliqua =

Species of moth

Elaphria subobliqua is a moth of the family Noctuidae. It is found from Mexico to Paraguay and on Jamaica, Cuba and Puerto Rico. It was first reported from Texas in 2004.

The wingspan is about 23 mm.
