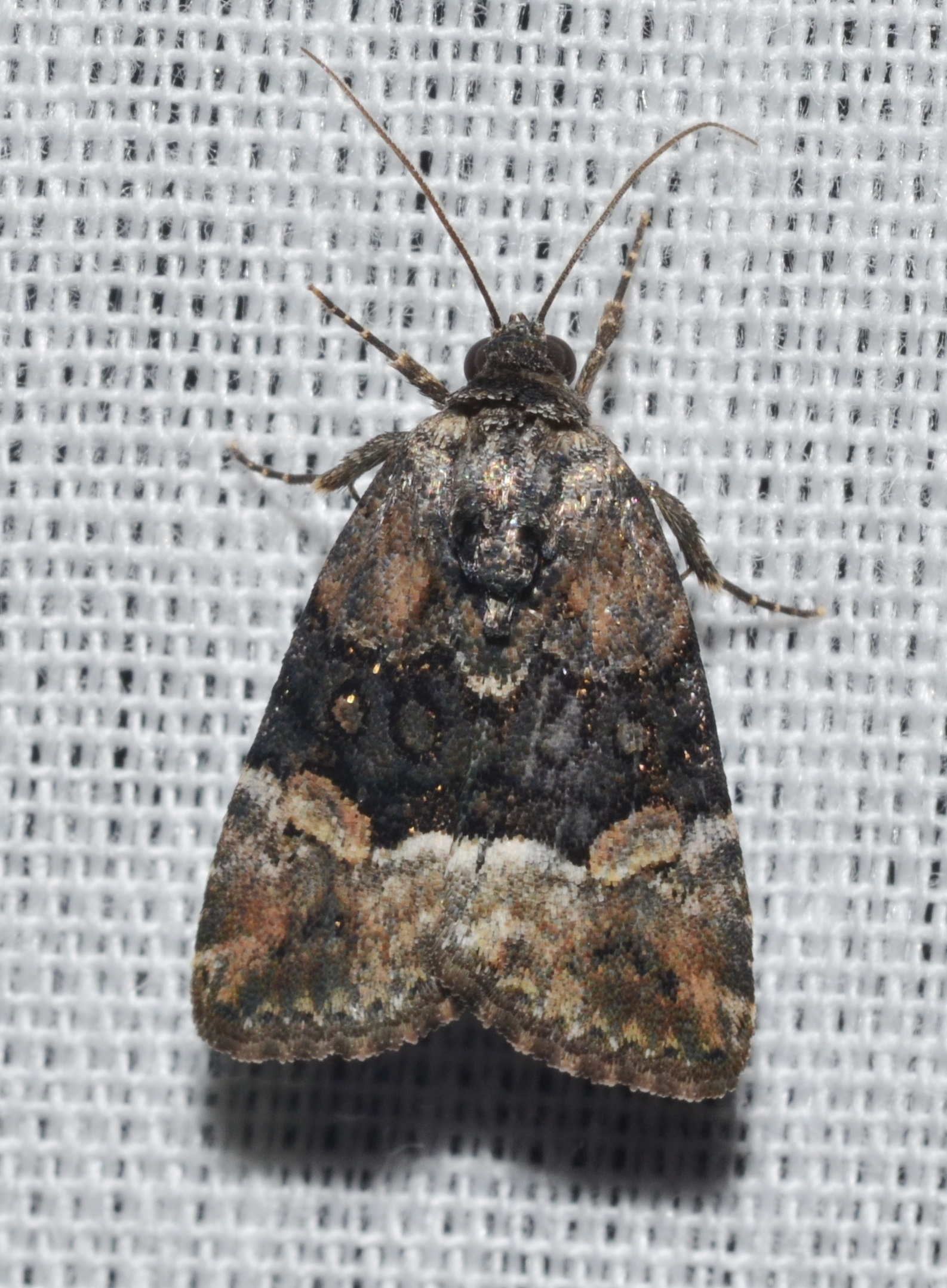

Scientific classification
- Domain: Eukaryota
- Kingdom: Animalia
- Phylum: Arthropoda
- Class: Insecta
- Order: Lepidoptera
- Superfamily: Noctuoidea
- Family: Noctuidae
- Tribe: Elaphriini
- Genus: Elaphria
- Species: E. georgei

Binomial name
- Elaphria georgei (Moore & Rawson, 1939)

= Elaphria georgei =

Species of moth

Elaphria georgei, or George's midget, is a species of cutworm or dart moth in the family Noctuidae. It is found in North America.

The MONA or Hodges number for Elaphria georgei is 9680.

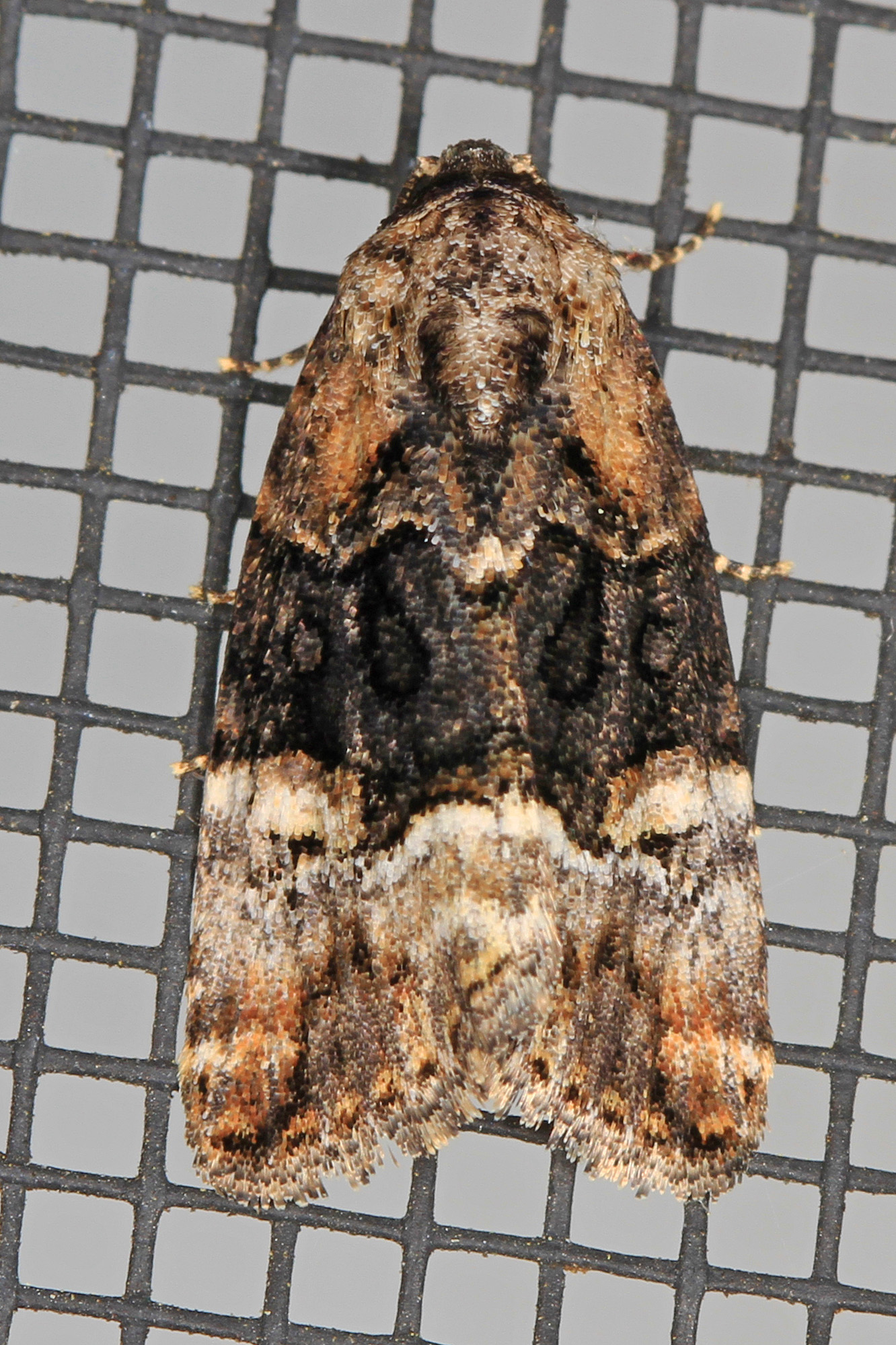
George's midget, Elaphria georgei
