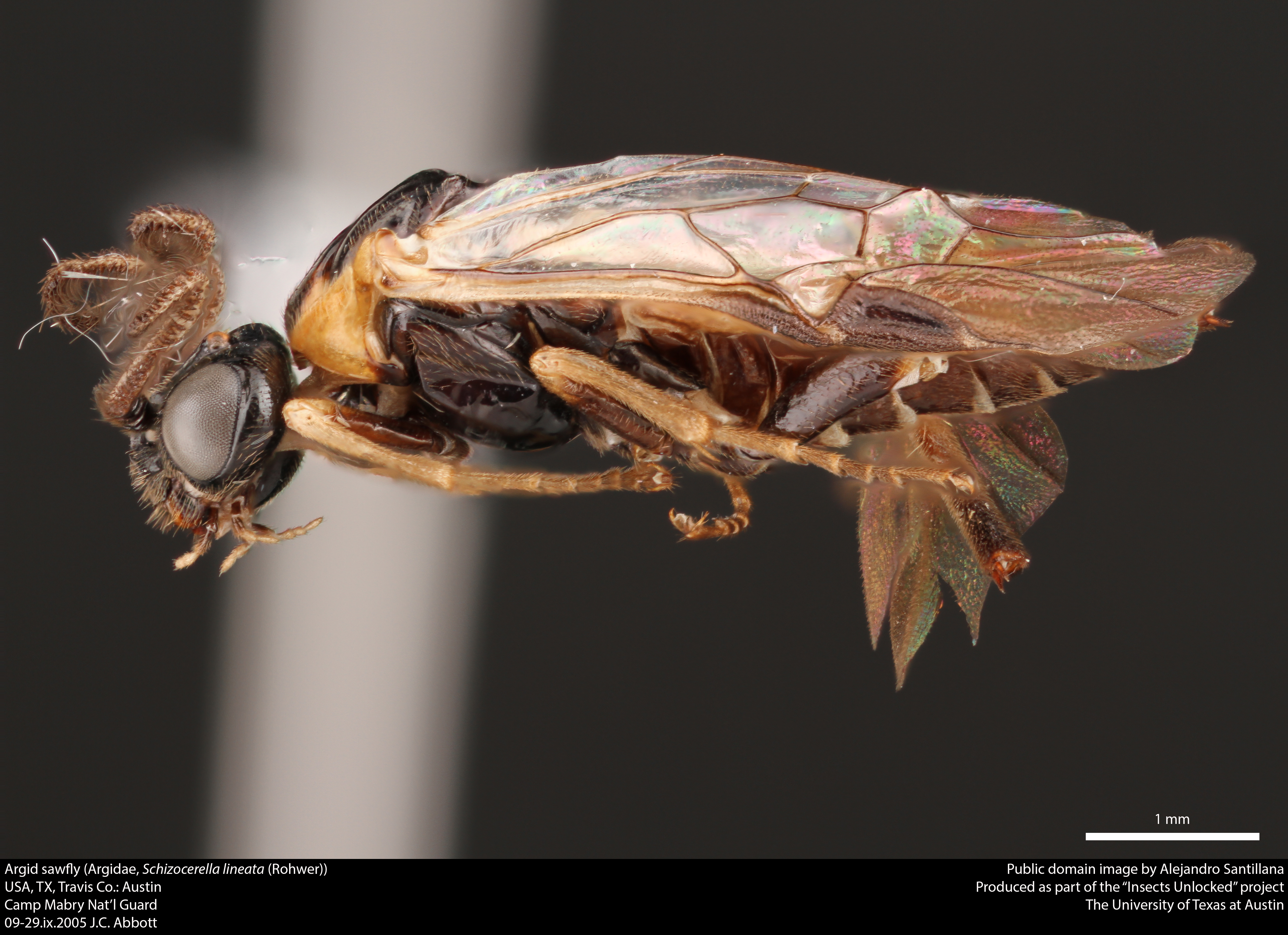
- Schizocerella lineata

Scientific classification
- Domain: Eukaryota
- Kingdom: Animalia
- Phylum: Arthropoda
- Class: Insecta
- Order: Hymenoptera
- Suborder: Symphyta
- Family: Argidae
- Subfamily: Sterictiphorinae
- Genus: Schizocerella; Forsius, 1927

= Schizocerella =

Genus of sawflies

Schizocerella is a genus of sawflies in the family Argidae. There are at least two described species in Schizocerella.

== Species ==
These two species belong to the genus Schizocerella:

- Schizocerella lineata (Rohwer)
- Schizocerella pilicornis (Holmgren) (purslane sawfly)
