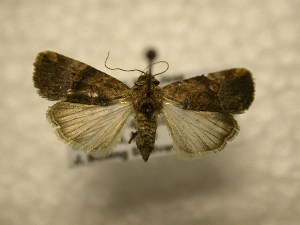

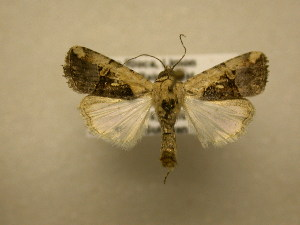

Scientific classification
- Kingdom: Animalia
- Phylum: Arthropoda
- Class: Insecta
- Order: Lepidoptera
- Superfamily: Noctuoidea
- Family: Noctuidae
- Genus: Elaphria
- Species: E. agrotina

Binomial name
- Elaphria agrotina (Guenée, 1852)

Synonyms
- Celaena agrotina Guenée, 1852; Monodes agrotina; Celaeno arnoides Herrich-Schäffer, 1868; Elaphria arnoides; Laphygma trientiplaga Walker, 1858; Hadena aduncula Felder & Rogenhofer, 1874

= Elaphria agrotina =

Species of moth

Elaphria agrotina is a moth of the family Noctuidae first described by Achille Guenée in 1852. It is found from North America (including Maryland, Virginia, Kentucky, Florida and Texas), through Central America, the Antilles and Cuba to Brazil and Argentina.

The wingspan is about 18 mm.

The larvae feed on Phaseolus species.
