= Portulaca oleracea =

- At Rhode Island, USA

Conservation status
- Least Concern (IUCN 3.1)

Scientific classification
- Kingdom: Plantae
- Clade: Tracheophytes
- Clade: Angiosperms
- Clade: Eudicots
- Order: Caryophyllales
- Family: Portulacaceae
- Genus: Portulaca
- Species: P. oleracea

Binomial name
- Portulaca oleracea L.

Varieties
- Portulaca oleracea var. delicatula Fosberg; Portulaca oleracea var. oleracea

Synonyms
- List: Portulaca hortensis Rupr. (1854), nom. superfl.; Portulaca officinarum Crantz (1766); Portulaca oleracea var. sylvestris DC. (1828), not validly publ.; Portulaca oleracea subsp. sylvestris Čelak. (1875), not validly publ.

Species of plant in the purslane family

Portulaca oleracea (common purslane, also known as little hogweed, or pursley) is a succulent plant in the family Portulacaceae. All parts of the plant are edible raw or cooked.

== Taxonomy ==
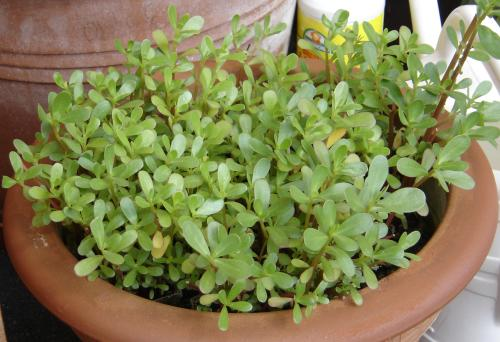
P. o. sativa

P. oleracea was recorded in 1753 by Carl Linnaeus in Species Plantarum. Due to the great variability, a large number of subspecies and varieties have been described as species of their own, but according to other publications, they all fall within the range of variation of P. oleracea. The synonyms P. oleracea subsp. sativa, P. sativa, and P. oleracea var. sativa, which are more common in the literature, refer to a somewhat more robust form in cultivation with larger seeds that cannot be separated from the species. Approximately 40 cultivars of P. oleracea are currently grown.

The flowering plant more commonly known as winter purslane (Claytonia perfoliata) is a member of the Montiaceae family and is not closely related.

=== Varieties ===
Two varieties are accepted.

- Portulaca oleracea var. delicatula Fosberg – endemic to Aldabra in the Seychelles
- Portulaca oleracea var. oleracea – native to full species range

=== Etymology ===
The specific epithet oleracea means "vegetable/herbal" in Latin and is a form of holeraceus (oleraceus), from holus 'vegetable'. The genus name portulāca is simply the plant's name in Latin.

== Distribution and habitat ==
Purslane has an extensive distribution, assumed to be mostly anthropogenic (or hemerochoric), extending from North Africa and Southern Europe through the Middle East and the Indian subcontinent to Malesia and Australasia. The species status in the Americas is uncertain. In general, it is often considered an exotic weed, but there is evidence that the species was in Crawford Lake deposits (Ontario) in 1350–1539, suggesting that it reached North America in the pre-Columbian era. Scientists suggested that the plant was already eaten by Native Americans, who spread its seeds. How it reached the Americas is currently unknown.

== Description ==
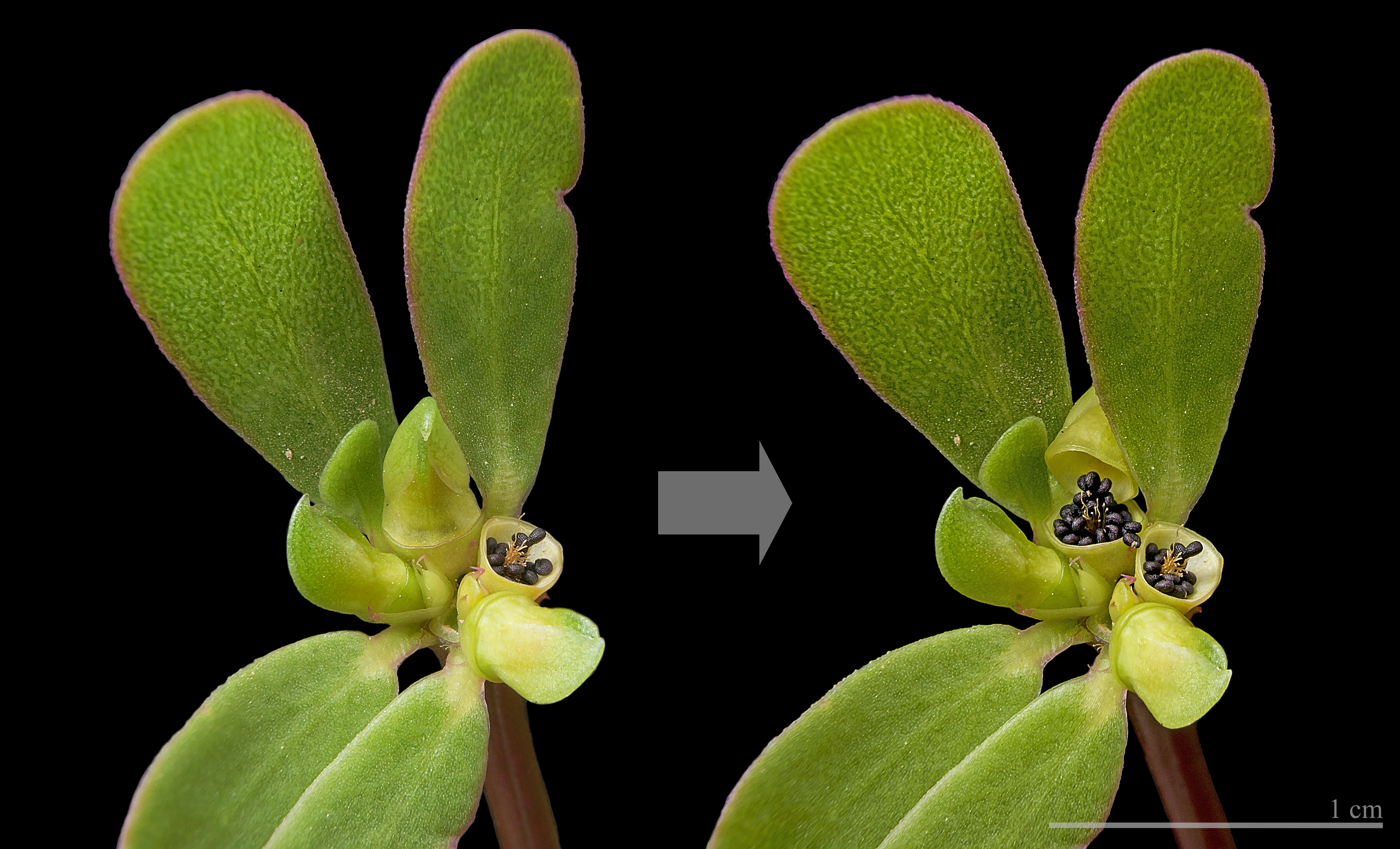
Seed capsule

P. oleracea flower

Growing in pavement, in Vancouver, Canada

Purslane grows from a taproot with fibrous secondary roots. The plant may reach 40 centimetres (16 inches) in height. It has smooth, reddish, mostly prostrate stems, and the leaves, which may be alternate or opposite, are clustered at stem joints and ends. The yellow flowers have five regular parts and are up to 6 millimetres (1/4 inch) wide. Depending upon rainfall, the flowers appear at any time during the year. The flowers open singly at the center of the leaf cluster for only a few hours on sunny mornings. The tiny seeds are formed in a pod that opens when the seeds mature.

The fruits are many-seeded capsules. The seed set is considerable; large plants have been reported to produce up to 240,000 seeds. The seeds germinate optimally at a temperature above 25 °C (77 °F); they are light germinators, with even a soil cover of 5 mm having a negative effect on germination.

Although usually an annual plant, it is a tropical perennial in United States Department of Agriculture growing zone 11.

=== Metabolism ===
P. oleracea is one of the very few plants able to utilize both C4 and crassulacean acid metabolism (CAM) photosynthesis pathways, long believed to be incompatible with each other despite biochemical similarities. P. oleracea will switch from C4 to CAM pathways during drought, and there is transcription regulation and physiological evidence for C4-CAM hybrid photosynthesis during mild drought.

=== Similar species ===
Several species of Portulaca are cultivated as ornamentals, most notably Portulaca grandiflora (commonly known as moss rose or sun rose). Unlike P. oleracea, which is a widespread edible weed, P. grandiflora is primarily grown for its brightly colored flowers and is less tolerant of disturbed soils.

In Japan, the name Hana-suberihiyu (花スベリヒユ, literally "flower purslane") is often used for these ornamental types, in order to distinguish them from the edible wild purslane.

== Ecology ==
The taproot helps the plant tolerate poor soil and drought.

Compared to other common crops, P. oleracea is more tolerant of pests due to its waxy cover, which protects the plant from insects and diseases. In some instances, P. oleracea is even known to have antifungal properties. However some phytotoxic metabolites of Drechslera indica, a fungus, can cause necrosis on purslane. Dichotomophthora portulacae, another fungus, can cause stem rot. P. oleracea is a known host plant of Hyles lineata.

Schizocerella pilicornis and Hypurus bertrandi are known to feed on Portulaca oleracea. In some instances, they may help control the competitiveness of P. oleracea to prevent weed infestation in fields where P. oleracea is not wanted, however, they do not stop it from growing completely.

=== Soil salinity ===
Salination of agricultural soils decreases the yields of many crops, and salt-sensitive species can no longer be cultivated on such soils. Purslane has a high tolerance for salt, making it suitable for cropping in areas where irrigation is carried out with water with high chloride-based salinity.

Purslane can remove salt from the cultivation medium under saline conditions. As an intercrop or during one growing season, it can remove 210 kg/ha of chloride and 65 kg/ha of sodium when cultivated at 6.5 dS/m, allowing growth of salt-sensitive plants on saline soils. In salty conditions, purslane has a positive effect on companion plants such as tomatoes.

== Uses ==
Purslane, raw
Nutritional value per 100 g (3.5 oz)
- Energy: 84 kJ (20 kcal)
- Carbohydrates: 3.39 g
- Fat: 0.36 g
- Protein: 2.03 g
Vitamins and minerals
Vitamins	Quantity %DV^{†}
Vitamin A	1320 IU
Thiamine (B1)	4% 0.047 mg
Riboflavin (B2)	9% 0.112 mg
Niacin (B3)	3% 0.48 mg
Vitamin B6	4% 0.073 mg
Folate (B9)	3% 12 μg
Vitamin C	23% 21 mg
Vitamin E	81% 12.2 mg
Minerals	Quantity %DV^{†}
Calcium	5% 65 mg
Iron	11% 1.99 mg
Magnesium	16% 68 mg
Manganese	13% 0.303 mg
Phosphorus	4% 44 mg
Potassium	16% 494 mg
Zinc	2% 0.17 mg
- Other constituents: Quantity
- Water: 92.86 g
- Link to USDA Database entry
- ^{†}Percentages estimated using US recommendations for adults, except for potassium, which is estimated based on expert recommendation from the National Academies.

=== Nutrition ===
Raw purslane is 93% water, 3% carbohydrates, 2% protein, and contains negligible fat. In a 100-gram reference amount, purslane supplies 20 calories, and rich amounts (20% or more of the Daily Value, DV) of vitamin E (81% DV) and vitamin C (25% DV), with moderate content (11–19% DV) of several dietary minerals. Purslane is a source of alpha-linolenic acid, an essential omega-3 fatty acid.

Purslane leaves are very high in oxalates, containing high levels, with one study finding \(23.45\pm 0.45\) g total oxalates per kg of fresh weight (or 23450 mg/kg). Another source reports \(671-869\) mg/100g fresh weight.

=== Culinary ===
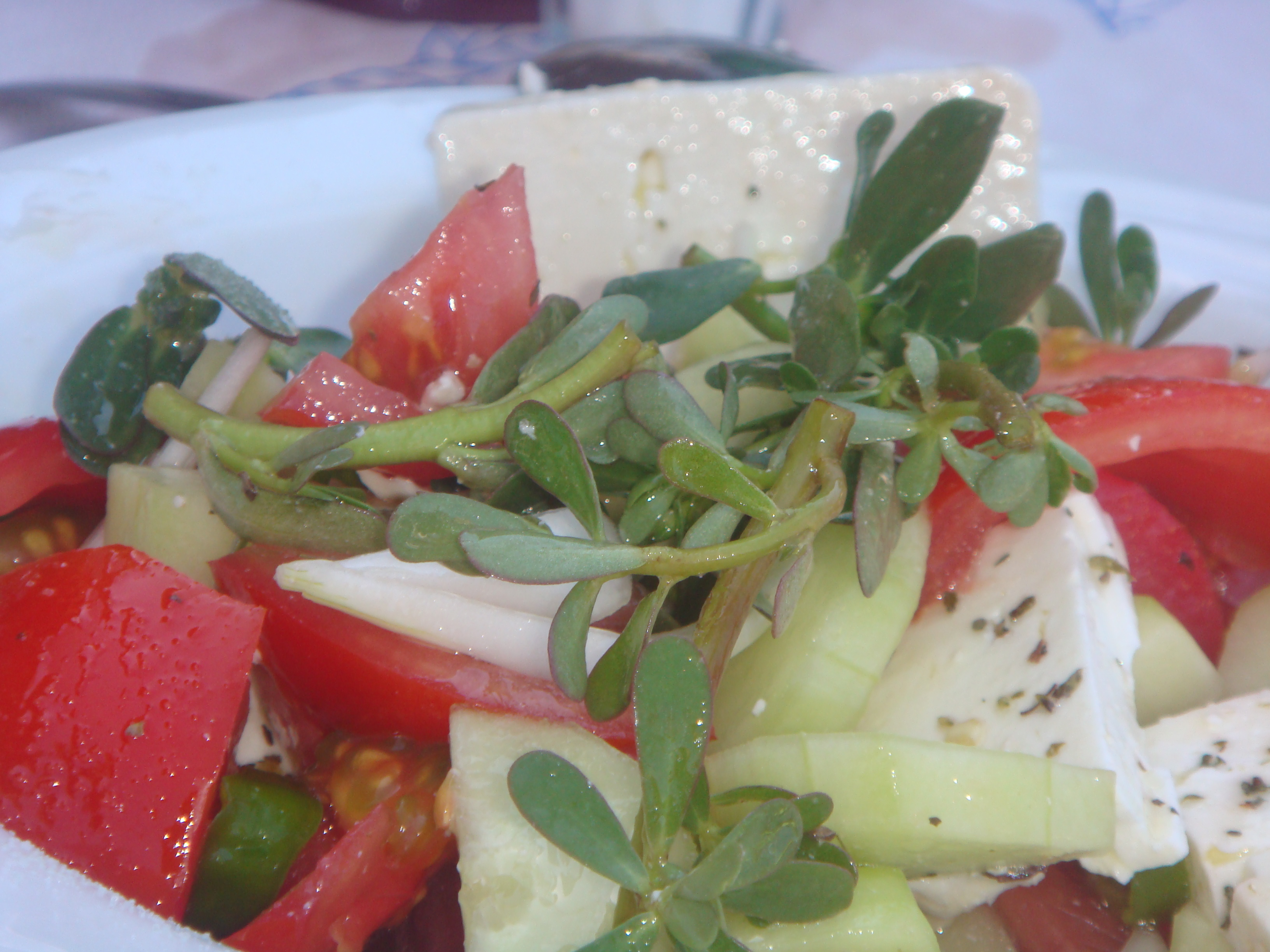
Greek salad with purslane

All parts of purslane are edible raw or cooked. The seeds can be eaten raw or used to make flour.

The plant may be eaten as a leaf vegetable. William Cobbett noted that it was "eaten by Frenchmen and pigs when they can get nothing else. Both use it in salad, that is to say, raw". It has a slightly sour and salty taste and is eaten throughout much of Europe, North Africa, the Middle East, Asia, and Mexico. The stems, leaves, and flower buds are all edible raw or cooked. Purslane may be used fresh as a salad, stir-fried, or cooked as spinach is, and because of its mucilaginous quality it also is suitable for soups and stews. The sour taste is due to oxalic and malic acid, the latter of which is produced through the CAM pathway that is seen in many xerophytes (plants living in dry conditions) and is at its highest when the plant is harvested in the early morning.

Aboriginal Australians use the seeds of purslane to make seedcakes. Greeks, who call it andrákla (αντράκλα) or glistrída (γλιστρίδα), use the leaves and the stems with feta cheese, tomato, onion, garlic, oregano, and olive oil. They add it to salads, boil it, or add it to casseroled chicken. In Turkey, besides being used in salads and baked pastries, it is cooked as a vegetable similar to spinach or is mixed with yogurt to form a tzatziki variant. In Sudan, the vegetable is known as regla (رجلة) it is also cooked as a vegetable stew, similar to how spinach and malva (خبيزة) are cooked, but not fresh in salads. In the Alentejo region of Portugal, purslane is used for cooking a traditional soup (sopa de beldroegas) which is topped with soaked bread, poached eggs, and/or goat's cheese. In Mexico and the American Southwest, the plant is consumed as verdolagas.

In disputed parts of Ukraine, civilians short of food have been eating purslane (under the Ukrainian name "portulak").

== In culture ==
Archaeobotanical finds are common at many Mediterranean prehistoric sites. In historic contexts, seeds have been retrieved from a protogeometric layer in Kastanas, as well as from the Samian Heraion dating to the 7th century BC. In the 4th century BC, Theophrastus names purslane, andrákhne (ἀνδράχνη), as one of the several summer pot herbs that must be sown in April (Enquiry into Plants 7.1.2). As Portulaca it figures in the long list of comestibles enjoyed by the Milanese given by Bonvesin de la Riva in his "Marvels of Milan" (1288).

In antiquity, its healing properties were thought so reliable that Pliny the Elder advised wearing the plant as an amulet to expel all evil (Natural History 20.210).

The plant is mentioned in Rabbinic literature variably as rgila (Hebrew: רְגִילָה), ḥalaglogit (Hebrew: חֲלַגְלוֹגִית), and parpaḥonya (Jewish Palestinian Aramaic: פַּרְפָּחוֹנַיָּא). The Babylonian Talmud recounts that sages were initially unfamiliar with the term ḥaloglogot. However, they realised it was the same as parpaḥonya after witnessing Rabbi Judah ha-Nasi's maidservant reprimand a man who was scattering the plant while using this term. The plant is also mentioned in a piyyut by Eleazar ben Kalir, by Maimonides, and by Tanhum of Jerusalem. Tanhum states that the plant is known to medics as "the fast vegetable" due to its quick spreading and branching.

Verdolaga, the Spanish word for purslane, is a nickname for South American football clubs with green-white schemes in their uniforms, including Colombia's Atletico Nacional and Argentina's Ferrocarril Oeste. Afro-Colombian singer Totó la Momposina sings a song entitled "La Verdolaga".

== See also ==
- List of beneficial weeds
- List of companion plants
