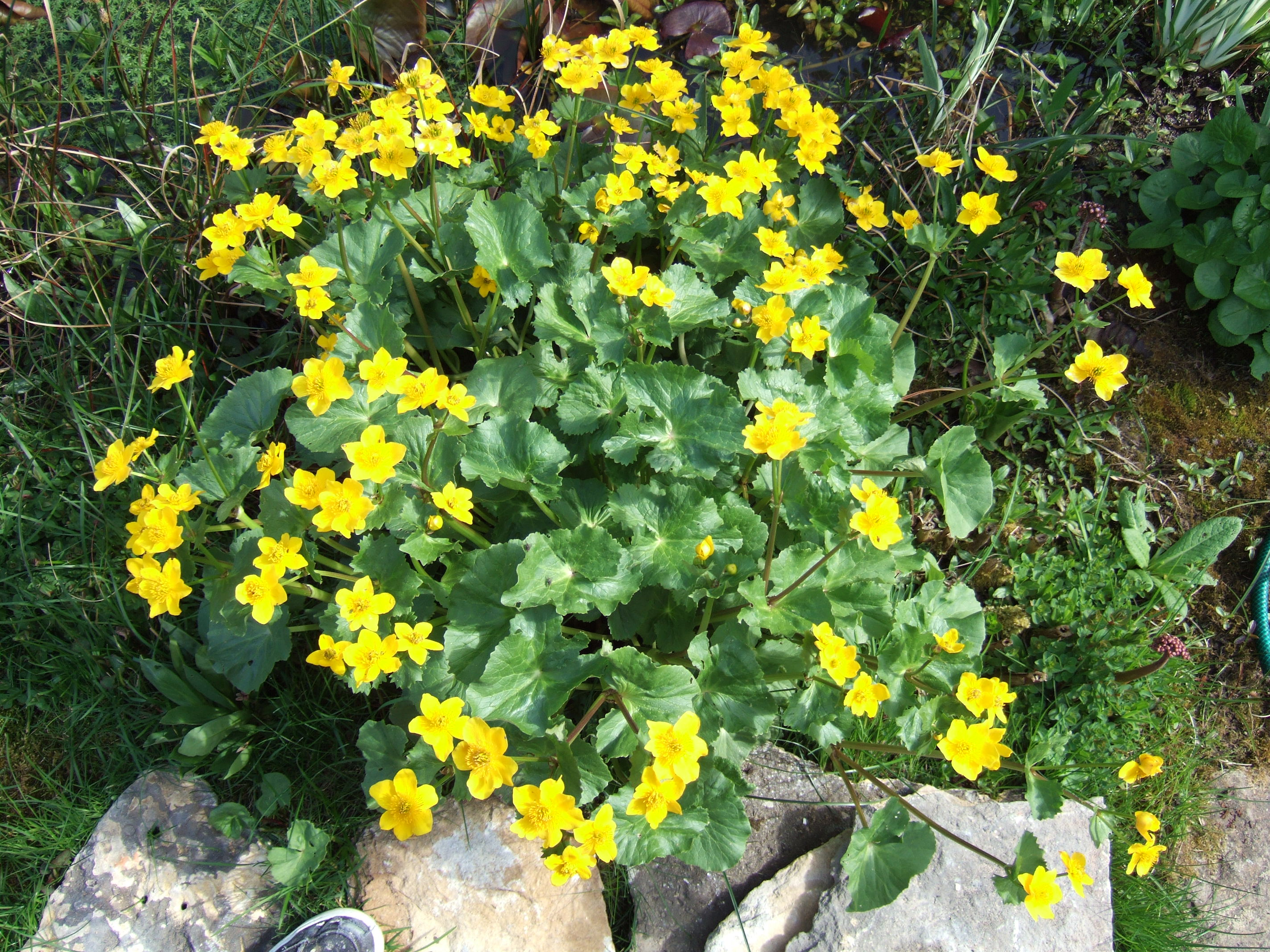

Scientific classification
- Kingdom: Plantae
- Clade: Tracheophytes
- Clade: Angiosperms
- Clade: Eudicots
- Order: Ranunculales
- Family: Ranunculaceae
- Genus: Caltha
- Species: C. palustris

Binomial name
- Caltha palustris L.

Varieties
- C. p. var. palustris; C. p. var. alba (Cambess.) Hook.f. & Thomson; C. p. var. purpurea Spare & Fischer; C. p. var. radicans (Forst.) Beck; C. p. var. araneosa Steenis

Synonyms
- Trollius paluster E.H.L.Krause

= Caltha palustris =

Species of flowering plant in the buttercup family

Caltha palustris, known as marsh-marigold and kingcup, is a small to medium sized perennial herbaceous plant of the buttercup family, native to marshes, fens, ditches and wet woodland in temperate regions of the Northern Hemisphere. It flowers between April and August, dependent on altitude and latitude, but occasional flowers may occur at other times.

== Description ==
Caltha palustris is a 10–80 centimetres (4–31 1/2 in) high, hairless, fleshy, perennial, herbaceous plant that dies down in autumn and overwinters with buds near the surface of the marshy soil. The plants have many, 2–3 millimetres (3/32–1/8 in) thick strongly branching roots. Its flowering stems are hollow, erect or more or less decumbent. The alternate true leaves are in a rosette, each of which consist of a petiole that is about four times as long as the kidney-shaped leaf blade, which is between 3–25 cm (1 1/4–9 3/4 in) long and 3–20 cm (1 1/4–7 3/4 in) wide. The leaf possesses a heart-shaped foot, a blunt tip, and a scalloped to toothed, sometime almost entire margin particularly towards the tip. In their youth the leaves are protected by a membranous sheath, that may be up to 3 cm (1 1/4 in) long in fully grown plants.

=== Inflorescence ===
The common marsh-marigold mostly has several flowering stems of up to 80 cm (31 in) long, carrying mostly several seated leaflike stipules, although lower ones may be on a short petiole; and between four and six (but occasionally as few as one or as many as 25) flowers. The flowers are approximately 4 cm (1 1/2 in) but range between 2–5.5 cm (3/4–2 1/4 in) in diameter. There are four to nine (mostly five) petal-like, brightly colored (yolk yellow, white or magenta), inverted egg-shaped sepals, each about 1.75 cm (3/4 in) but ranging from 1–2.5 cm (1/2–1 in) long, and about 1.33 cm (1/2 in), ranging from 0.75–1.75 cm (1/4–3/4 in) wide; they have a blunt or sometimes acute tip. Real petals and nectaries are lacking. Between 50 and 120 stamens with flattened yellow filaments and yellow tricolpate or sometimes pantoporate pollen encircle 5–25 free, flattened, linear-oblong, yellow to green carpels, with a two-lobed, obliquely positioned stigma, and each with many seedbuds. This later develops into a seated, funnel-shaped fruit (a so-called follicle) of 0.75–2 cm (1/4–3/4 in) long and 0.25–0.5 cm (1/8–1/4 in) wide, that opens with one suture at the side of the axis and contains 7–20 ovoid, brown to black seeds of about 2.5 mm × 1.5 mm (3/32 in × 1/16 in).

== Taxonomy ==
=== Taxonomic history ===
The oldest description that is generally acknowledged in the botanical literature dates from 1700 under the name Populago by Joseph Pitton de Tournefort in part 1 of his Institutiones rei herbariae. He distinguished between P. flore major, P. flore minor and P. flore plena, and already says all of these are synonymous to Caltha palustris, without mentioning any previous author. As a plant name published before 1 May 1753, Populago Tourn. is invalid. And so is the first description as Caltha palustris by Carl Linnaeus in his Genera Plantarum of 1737. But Linnaeus re-describes the species under the same name in Species Plantarum of 1 May 1753, thus providing the correct name.

=== Etymology ===
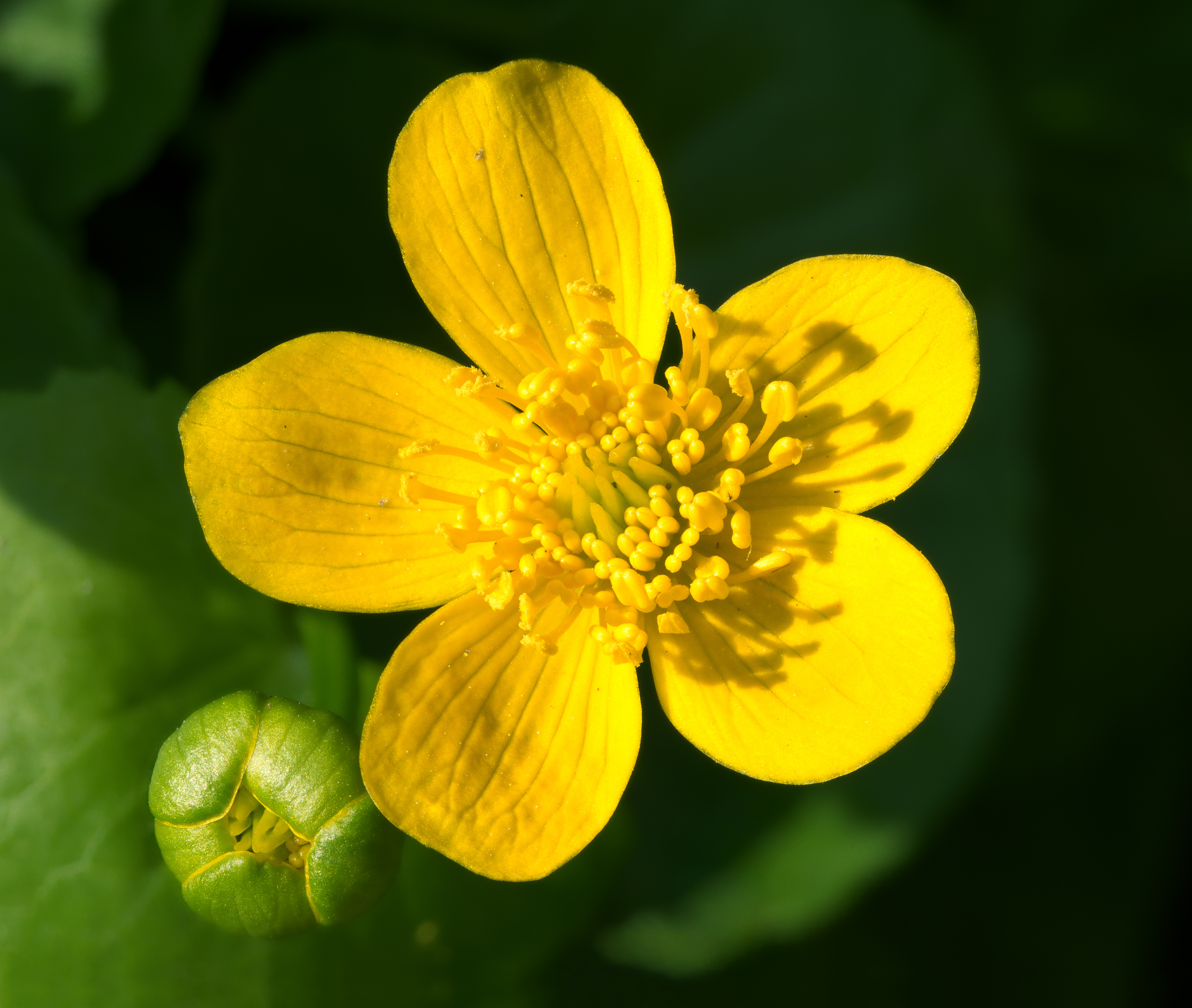
A Caltha palustris flower and bud at the Ljubljana Botanical Garden in Slovenia

The generic name Caltha is derived from the Ancient Greek κάλαθος (kálathos), meaning "goblet", and is said to refer to the shape of the flower. The species epithet palustris is Latin for "of the marsh" and indicates its common habitat.

In the UK, Caltha palustris is known by a variety of vernacular names, varying by geographical region. These include in addition to the most common two, marsh marigold and kingcup, also brave bassinets, crazy Beth, horse blob, Molly-blob, May blob, mare blob, boots, water boots, meadow-bright, bullflower, meadow buttercup, water buttercup, soldier's buttons, meadow cowslip, water cowslip, publican's cloak, crowfoot, water dragon, drunkards, water goggles, meadow gowan, water gowan, yellow gowan, goldes, golds, goldings, gools, cow lily, marybuds, and publicans-and-sinners. The common name "marigold" refers to its use in medieval churches at Easter as a tribute to the Virgin Mary, as in "Mary gold". In North America Caltha palustris is sometimes known as cowslip. However, cowslip more often refers to Primula veris, the original plant to go by that name. Both are herbaceous plants with yellow flowers, but Primula veris is much smaller.

=== Subdivision, synonymy and culture varieties ===
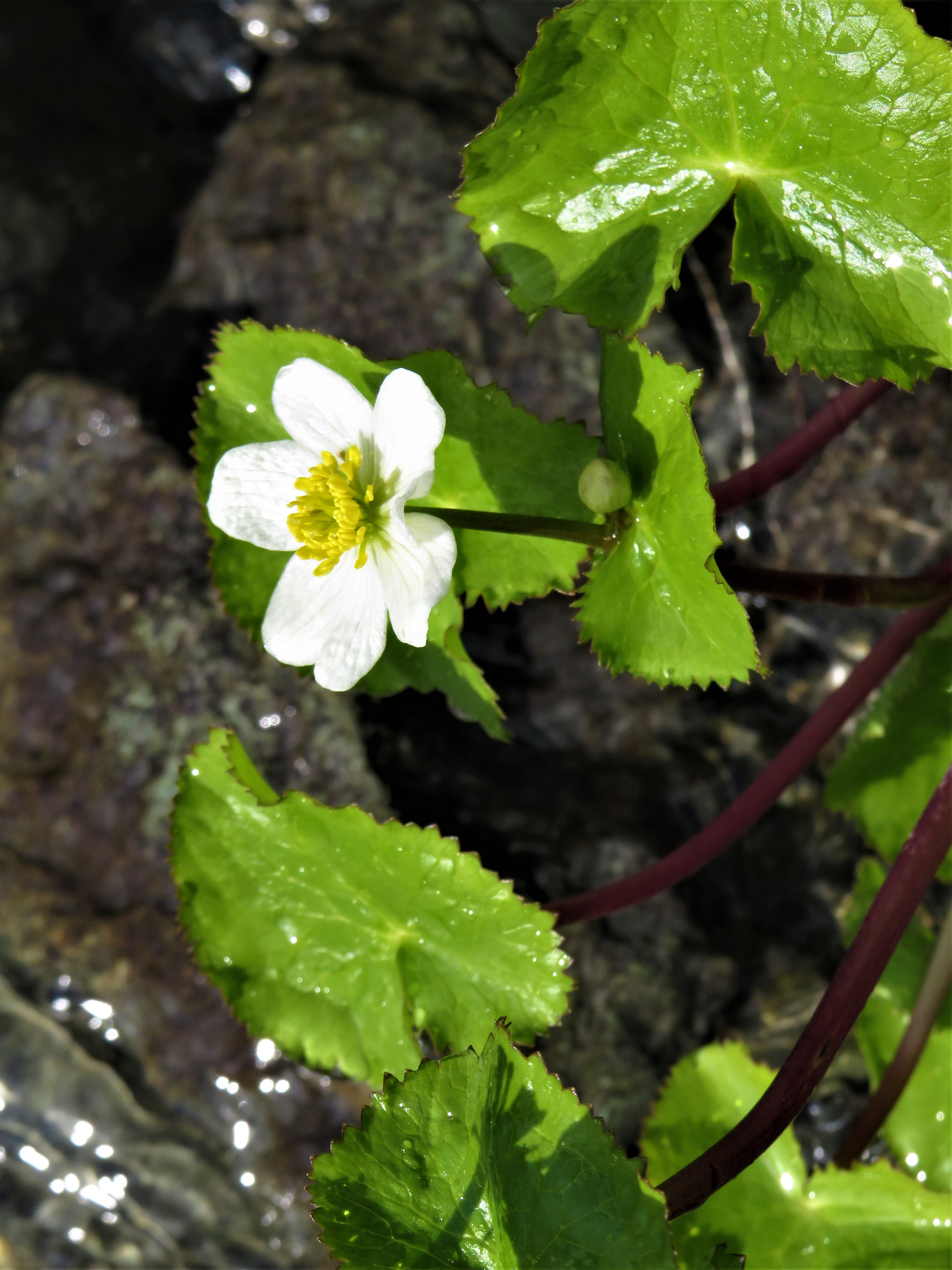
White form seen in the Himalayas in Kashmir, India

Caltha palustris is a very variable species. Since most character states occur in almost any combination, this provides little basis for subdivisions. The following varieties are nevertheless widely recognised. They are listed with their respective synonyms. If an epithet based on the same type specimen is used at different levels, only the use at the highest taxonomic rank is listed, so as C. himalensis is already listed, C. palustris var. himalensis is not.

- Yellow sepals, pollen tricolpate, not rooting at the nodes.
  → C. palustris var. palustris =
  - C. palustris forma decumbens, f. erecta, f. gigas, f. plena, f. plurisepala, f. pratensis
  - C. palustris subvar. palmata
  - C. palustris var. acuteserrata, var. bosnica, var. crenata, var. cuneata, var. dentata, var. ficariaeformis, var. holubyi, var. minima, var. nipponica, var. orbicularis, var. ranunculiflora, var. recurvirostris, var. siberica (Regel, 1861), var. stagnalis, var. umbrosa
  - C. palustris ssp. thracica
  - C. alpestris, C. alpina, C. asarifolia, C. barthei, C. confinis, C. cornuta, C. elata, C. ficarioides, C. fistulosa, C. grosse-serrata, C. guerrangerii, C. himalensis, C. integerrima, C. intermedia, C. laeta, C. latifolia, C. longirostris, C. major, C. minor, C. orthorhyncha, C. pallidiflora, C. parnassifolia, C. polypetala, C. procumbens, C. pumila, C. pygmea, C. ranunculoides, C. riparia, C. silvestris, C. vulgaris
- Yellow sepals, pollen tricolpate, smaller plants, with few-flowered decumbent stems rooting at the nodes after flowering. Grows at the northern edges of the distribution area of the species and on erosion prone banks.
  → C. palustris var. radicans =
  - C. palustris var. aleutensis, var. siberica (Tolmachev, 1955)
  - C. arctica, C. cespitosa, C. flabellifolia, C. zetlandica
- Yellow sepals, pollen tricolpate, larger plants, with many-flowered erect stems rooting at the nodes after flowering. Occurs in the Netherlands in a fresh water tidal zone (De Biesbosch).
  → C. palustris var. araneosa (only generally recognised in the Netherlands)
- White sepals, pollen pantoporate or sometimes tricolpate. Between 2200 and 3500 m along rivulets in Afghanistan, Pakistan and the western Himalayas from Kashmir to northern India.
  → C. palustris var. alba =
  - C. palustris forma alpina, f. sylvatica
  - C. alba
- Magenta sepals, pollen tricolpate. Between 4000 and 5000 m in alpine meadows and mossy slopes between shrubs and tall herbs in the eastern Himalayas of Assam and southern Tibet.
  → C. palustris var. purpurea =
  - C. rubriflora
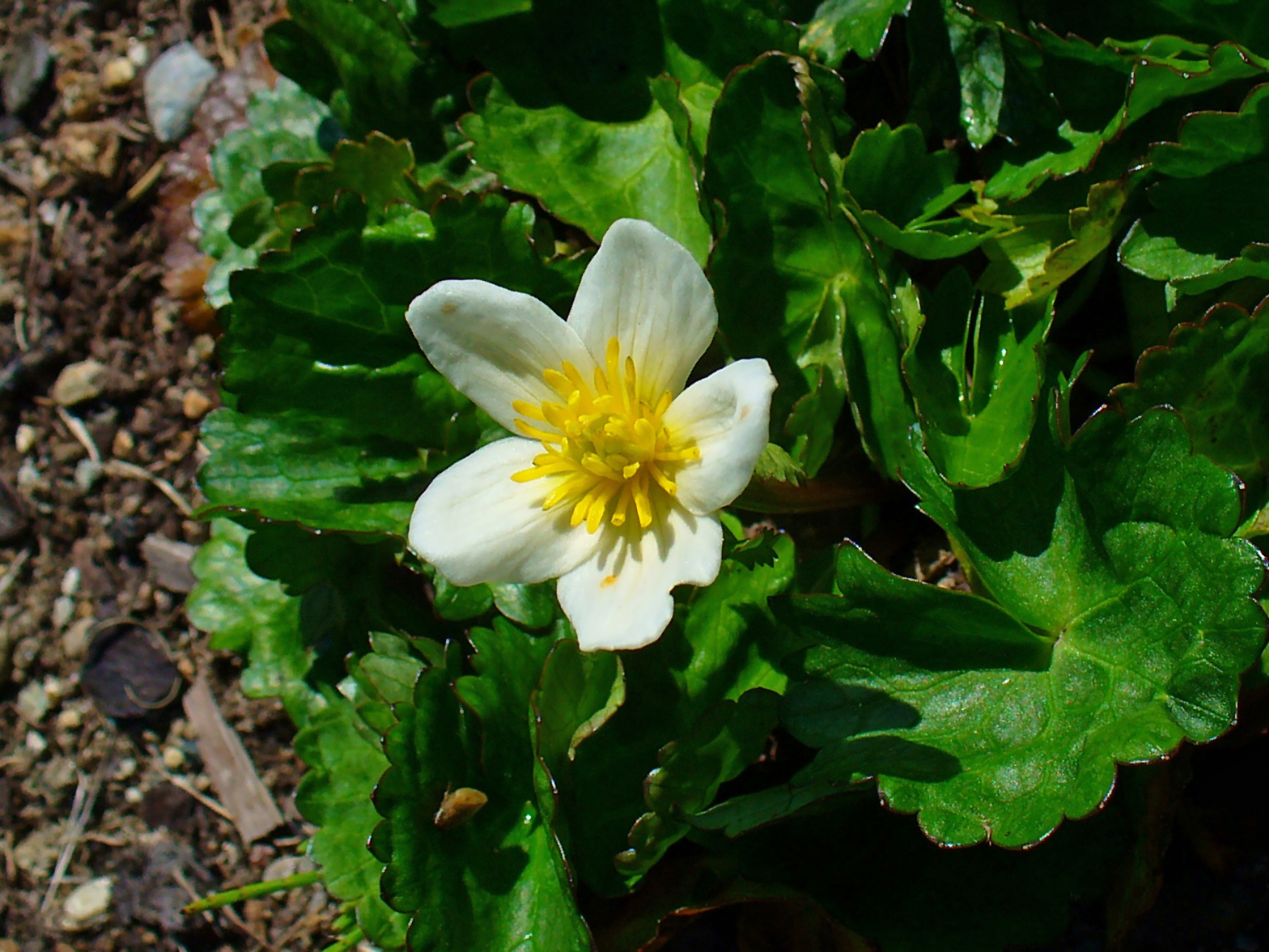
C. palustris var. alba

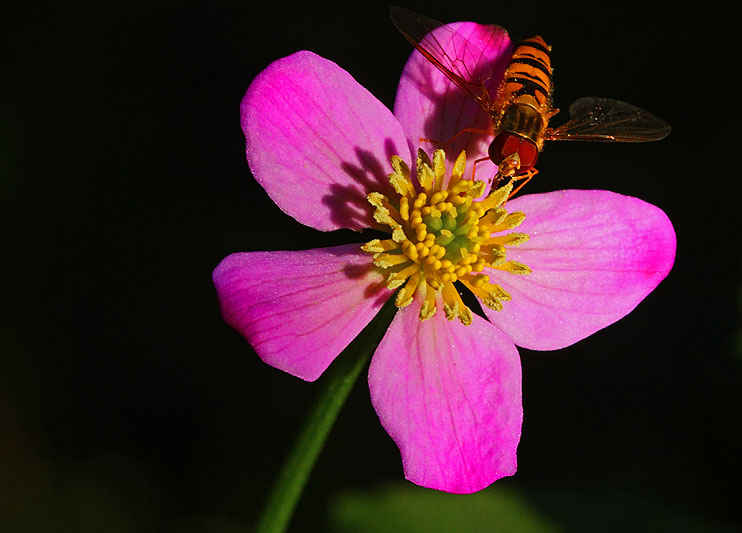
C. palustris var. purpurea

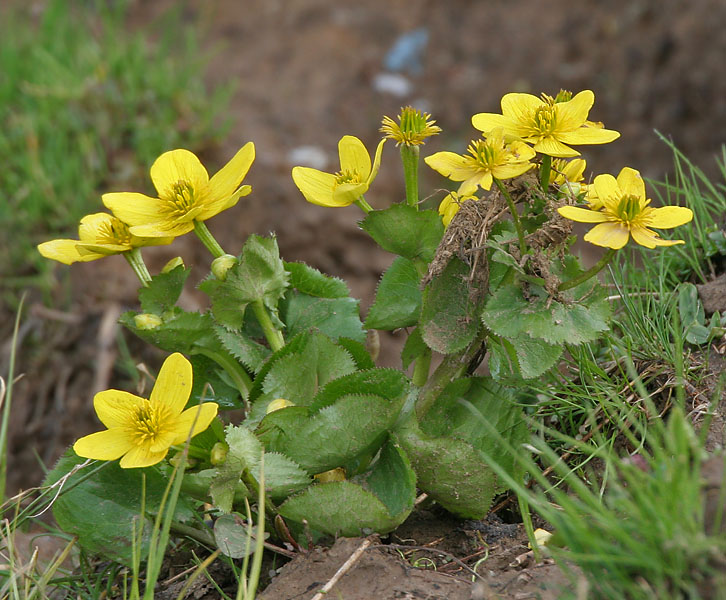
C. palustris var. palustris

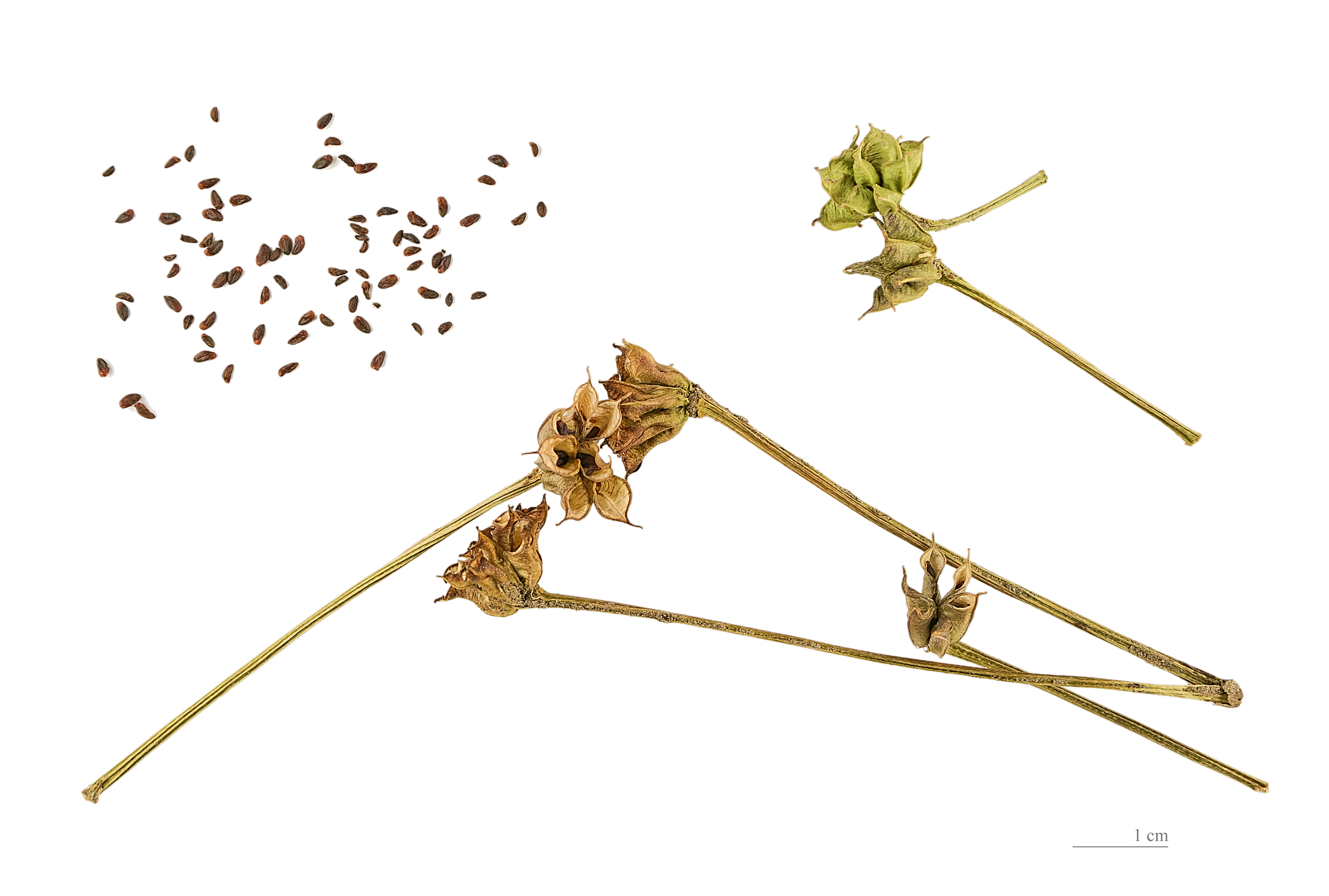
opened follicles

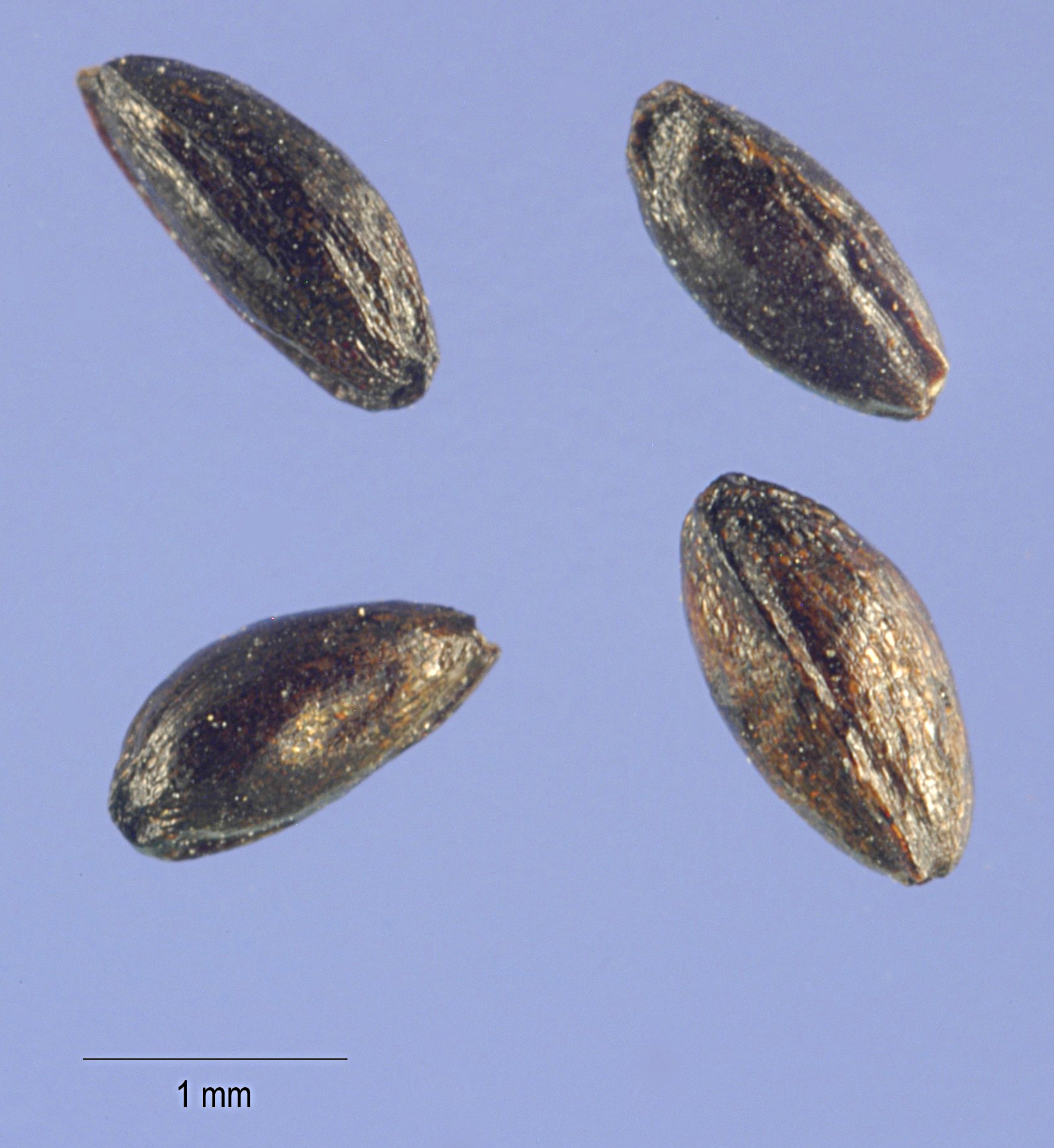
seeds

The 2006–2007 edition of the Royal Horticultural Society Plant Finder, a British publication which lists over 70,000 plants available in nurseries in the United Kingdom, lists in addition to these varieties the following cultivars: Single flowered: "Marilyn", "Trotter's form", "Yellow Giant". Double flowered: "Flore Pleno" (RHS's Award of Garden Merit), "Multiplex", "Plena", "Semiplena".

== Distribution and habitat ==
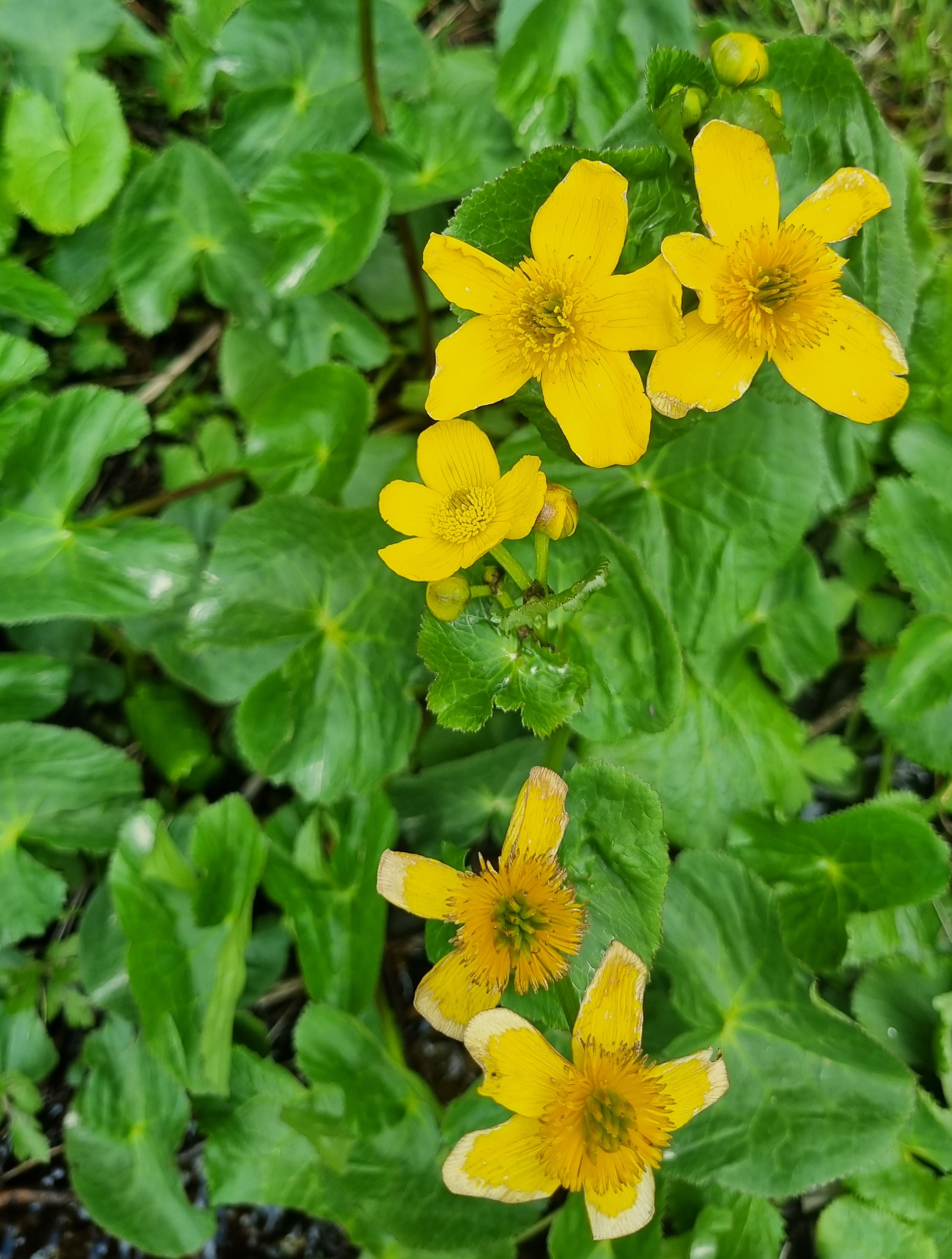
Closeup view of Caltha palustris in Himachal Pradesh, India.

The species is native to marshes, fens, ditches and wet woodland in temperate regions of the Northern Hemisphere. It can be found in much of the northeastern United States.

== Ecology ==
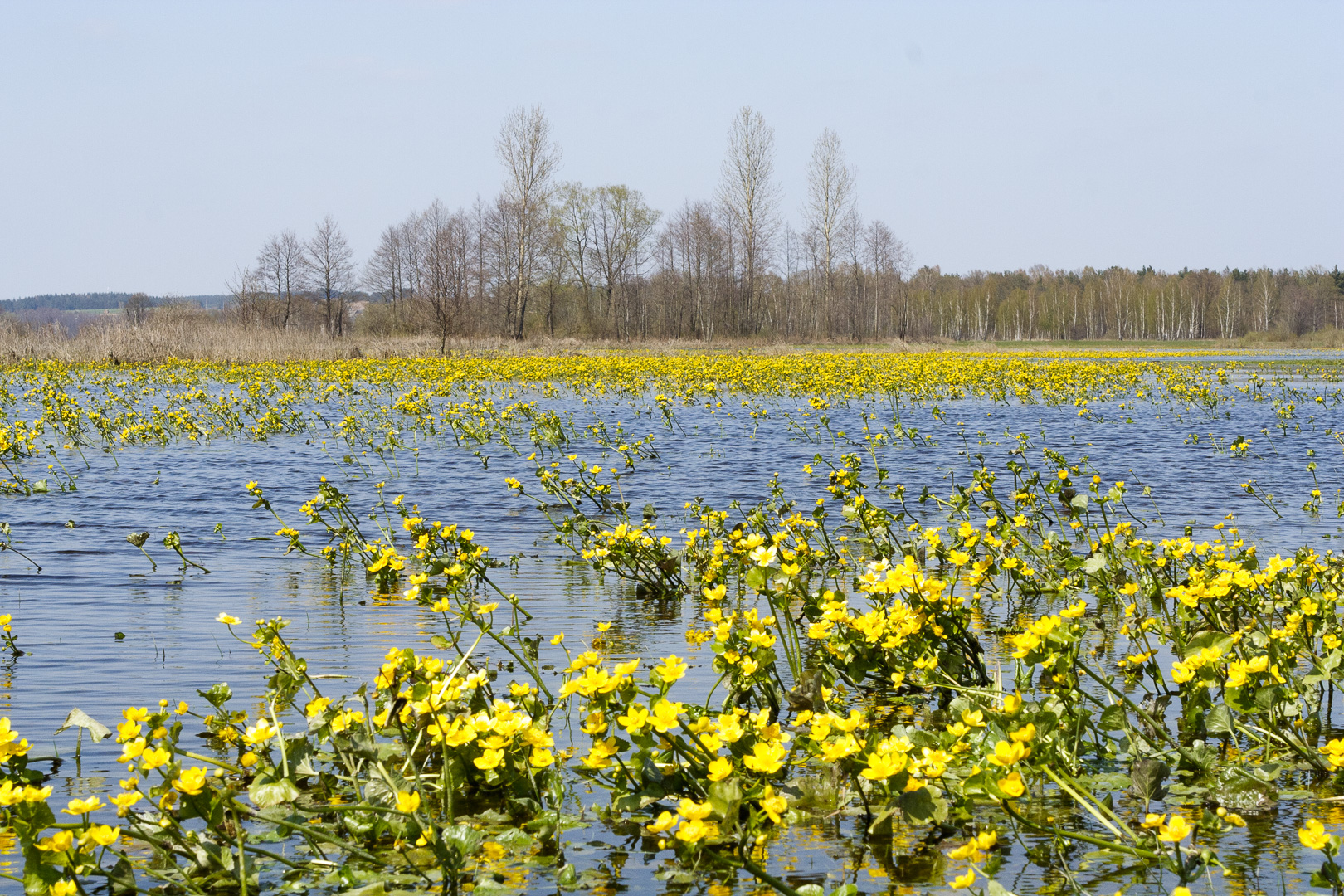
The marsh-marigold on spring flood plains of the Narew river.

The marsh-marigold grows in places with oxygen-rich water near the surface of the soil. It likes richer soils, but dislikes application of fertilizer and avoids high concentrations of phosphate and ammonium, and is also shy of brackish water. It is often associated with seepage that is rich in iron, because iron ions react with phosphate, thus making it unavailable for plants. The resulting insoluble mineral appears as "rusty" flocs on the water soil and the surface of the stems of marsh plants. Around the edge of lakes and rivers it grows between reeds, and it can be found in black alder coppices and other regularly flooded and always moist forests. When it is present it often visually dominates when it is in bloom. It also used to be common on wet meadows, but due to agricultural rationalization it is now limited to ditches.

It is a component of purple moor grass and rush pastures – a type of Biodiversity Action Plan habitat in the UK. It occurs on poorly drained neutral and acidic soils of the lowlands and upland fringe.

In western Europe, the marsh-marigold moth Micropterix calthella bites open the anthers of the marsh-marigold and other plants to eat the pollen. The caterpillars that are present in summer and autumn also feed on marsh-marigold, although these are sometimes found on mosses too. Another visitor of Caltha palustris in western Europe is the leaf beetle Prasocuris phellandrii, which is black with four orange stripes and around ½ cm and eats the sepals. Its larvae inhabit the hollow stems of members of the parsley family. In the USA (Illinois) two species of leaf beetle can be found on Caltha: Plateumaris nitida and Hydrothassa vittata. The maggots of some Phytomyza species (Agromyzidae) are miners in Caltha leaves.

=== Pollination ===
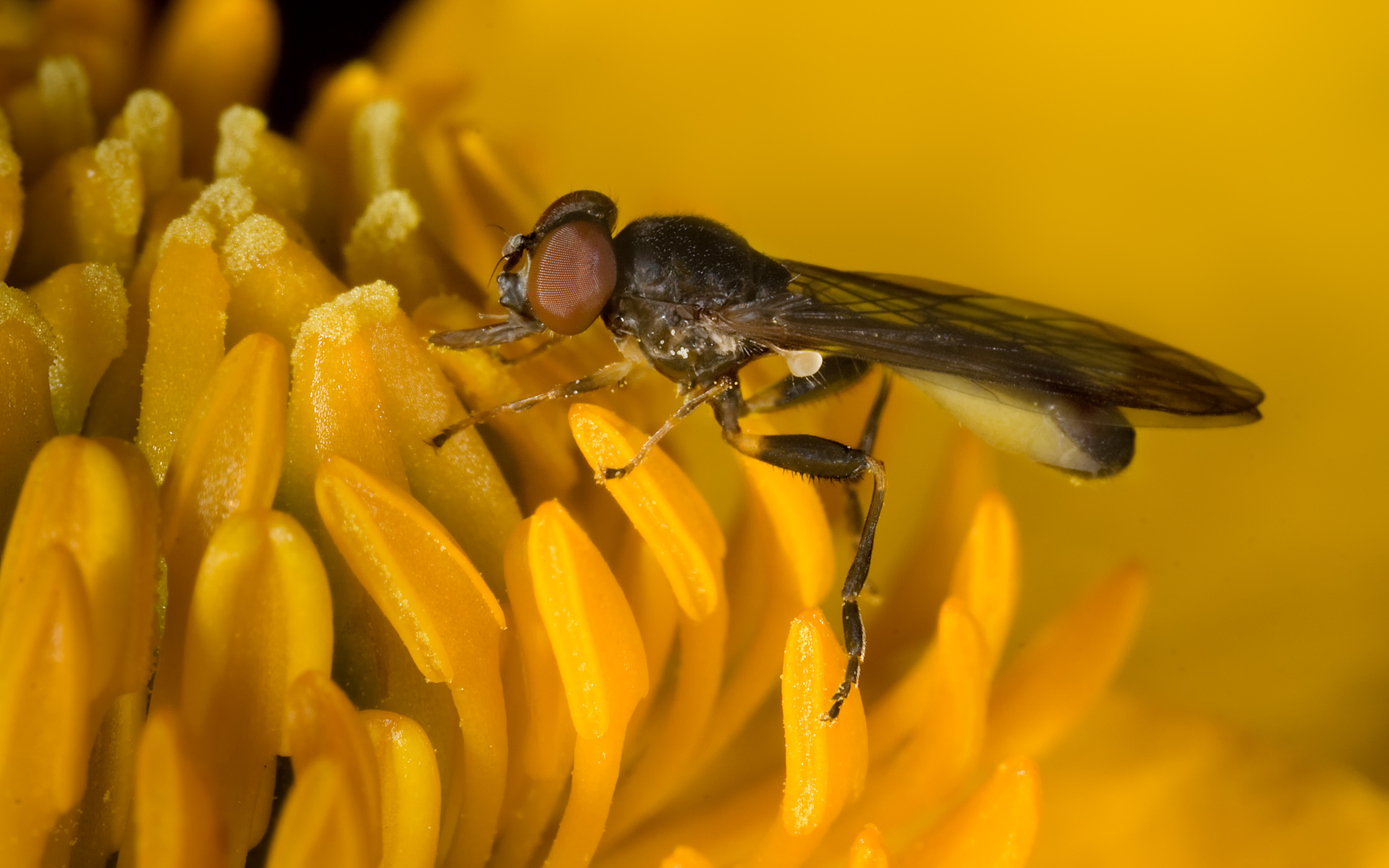
Caltha palustris pollination by a syrphid fly (Sphegina montana)

The flowers produce both nectar and copious amounts of pollen which attract many insect visitors. They may be most commonly pollinated by hoverflies (Syrphidae). In Canada, beetles (Cantharidae, Nitidulidae, Coccinellidae, Chrysomelidae, Cerambycidae), thrips (Thripidae), bugs (Miridae), butterflies (Pieridae), sawflies (Tenthredinidae), bees (Apidae, Halictidae, Andrenidae), ants (Formicidae) and flies (Sepsidae, Sciomyzidae, Ephydridae, Syrphidae, Anthomyiidae, Tachinidae and Muscidae) have been observed to visit the leaves or flowers, many of which were found carrying Caltha pollen. In addition to other forms of pollination, this plant is adapted to rain-pollination.

Caltha palustris is infertile when self-pollinated. Rather high fertility in crosses between sibling plants suggest that this phenomenon is genetically regulated by several genes. This regulation mechanism also occurs in Ranunculus and as far as known only in these two genera.

=== Seed dispersal ===
In Caltha palustris up to two hundred seeds may be produced by each flower. When the follicles open, they form a "splash cup". When a raindrop hits one at the right angle, the walls are shaped such that the seeds are expelled. The seeds also have some spongy tissue that makes them float on water, until they wash up in a location that may be suitable for this species to grow.

=== Diseases ===
The marsh-marigold is affected by the rust species Puccinia calthea and P. calthicola.

== Toxicity ==
Caltha contains several active substances of which the most important from a toxicological point of view is protoanemonin. Consumption of larger quantities of the plant may cause convulsions, burning of the throat, vomiting, bloody diarrhea, dizziness and fainting. Contact of the skin or mucous membranes with the juices can cause blistering or inflammation, and gastric illness if ingested. Younger parts seem to contain less toxics and heating breaks these substances down. Small amounts of Caltha in hay do not cause problems when fed to husbandry, but larger quantities lead to gastric illness.

Additionally, plants that live in raw water may carry toxic organisms which can be neutralized by cooking.

== Uses ==
Early spring greens and buds of Caltha palustris are edible when cooked (but are poisonous when raw). Young leaves or buds should be submerged a few times in fresh boiling water until barely tender, cut into bite-sized pieces, lightly salted, and served with melted butter and vinegar. Very young flowerbuds have been prepared like capers and used as a spice.

The common marsh marigold is planted as an ornamental throughout temperate regions in the world, and sometimes recommended for low maintenance wildlife gardens. The double-flowered cultivar 'Flore Pleno' has won the Royal Horticultural Society's Award of Garden Merit.

== Culture ==
Caltha palustris is a plant commonly mentioned in literature, including Shakespeare:

Winking Marybuds begin
To open their golden eyes (Cymbeline, ii. 3).

It also appears in Charlotte Brontë's Shirley:

They both halted on the green brow of the Common: they looked down on the deep valley robed in May raiment; on varied meads, some pearled with daisies, and some golden with king-cups: to-day all this young verdure smiled clear in sunlight; transparent emerald and amber gleams played over it

and in Thomas Hardy's poem 'Overlooking the River Stour':

Closed were the kingcups; and the mead/Dripped in monotonous green,/Though the day's morning sheen/Had shown it golden and honeybee'd.

Kingcup Cottage by Racey Helps is a children's book which features the plant.
