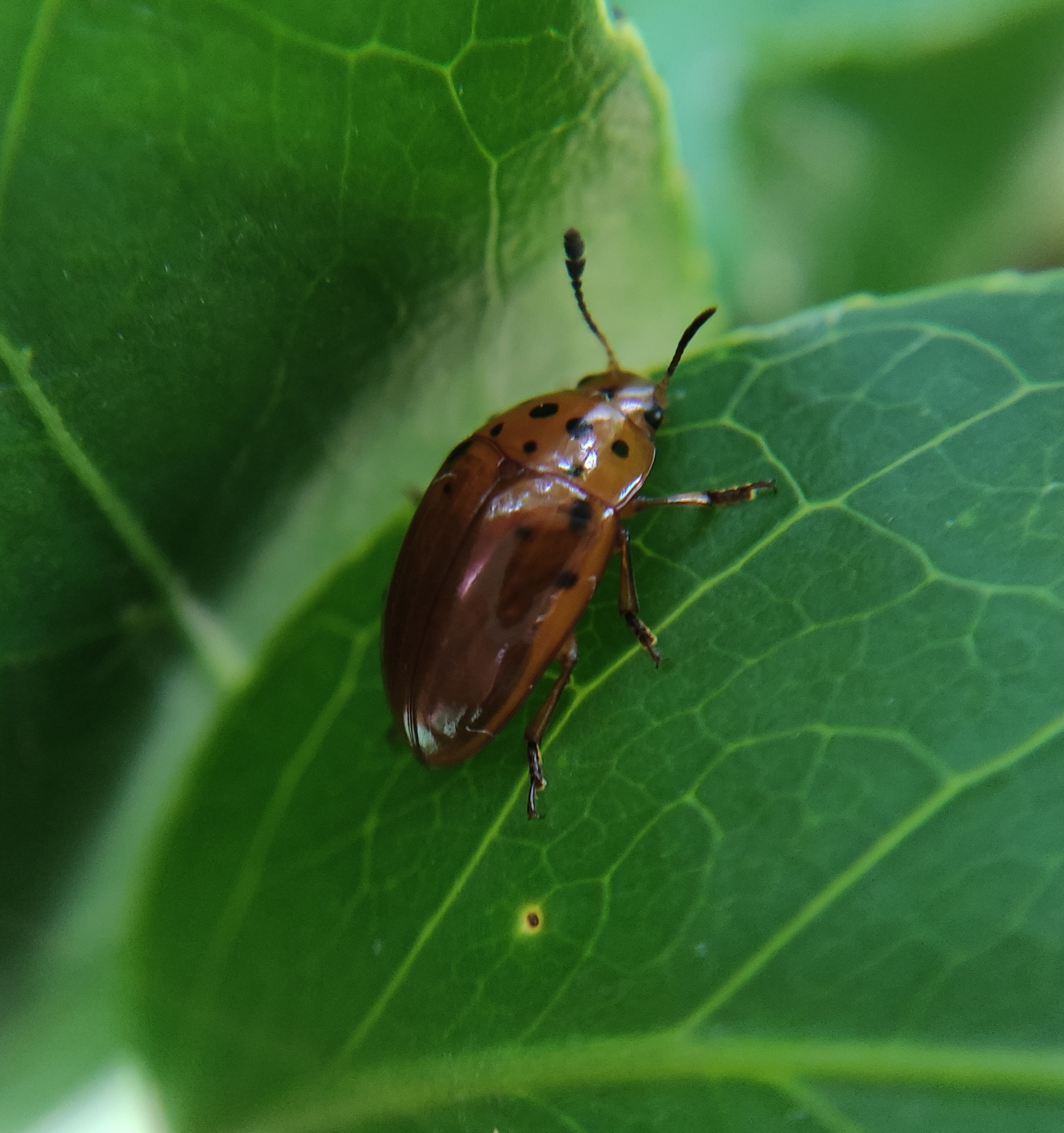
- Adult of the Nigropunctatus form near Ibiúna, Brazil

Scientific classification
- Kingdom: Animalia
- Phylum: Arthropoda
- Clade: Pancrustacea
- Class: Insecta
- Order: Coleoptera
- Suborder: Polyphaga
- Infraorder: Cucujiformia
- Family: Erotylidae
- Genus: Mycotretus
- Species: M. ornatus

Binomial name
- Mycotretus ornatus (Duponchel, 1825)

Synonyms
- Numerous; see text

= Mycotretus ornatus =

Species of beetle

Mycotretus ornatus is a species of beetle of the pleasing fungus beetle family (Erotylidae). This species is widespread in the Neotropical region, from Costa Rica through the Amazon Basin and the adjacent Andes foothills to northern Argentina.

This is one of the most variable species of the Erotylidae. A number of varieties and subspecies (today treated as forms) have been named, and many supposedly distinct species of Mycotretus eventually turned out to be merely additional color variants of M.ornatus.

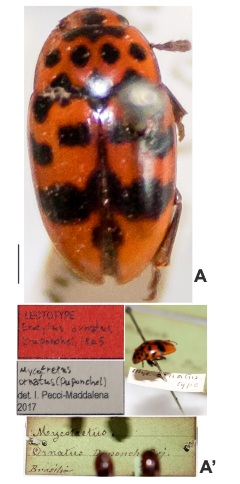
Typical form

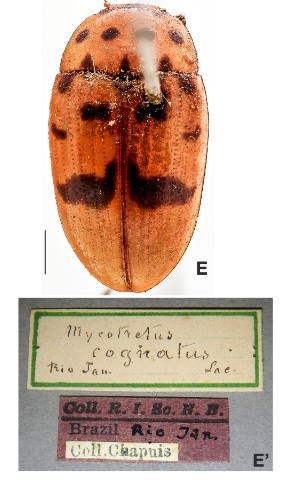
Cognatus form

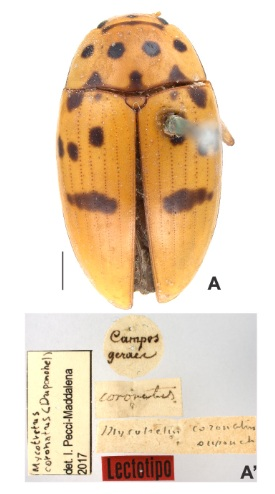
Coronatus form

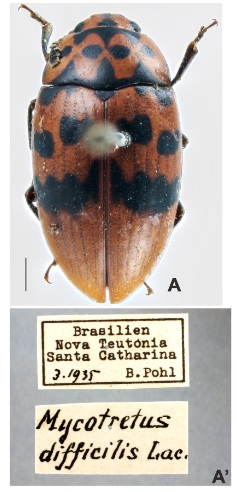
Difficilis form

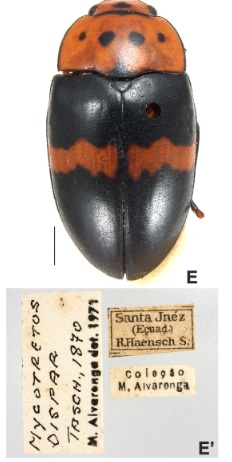
Dispar form

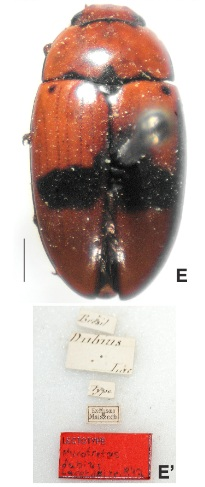
Dubius form

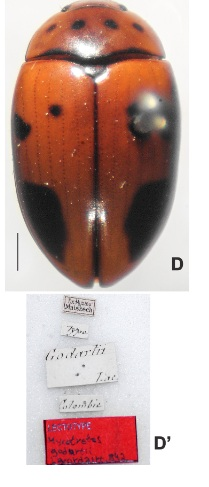
Godarti form

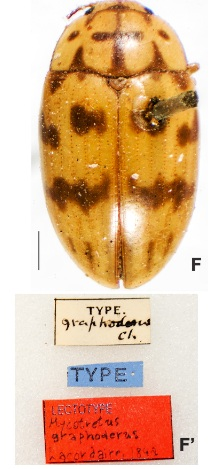
Graphoderus form

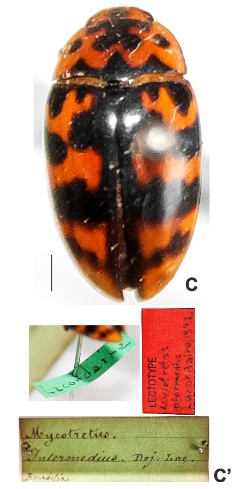
Intermedius form

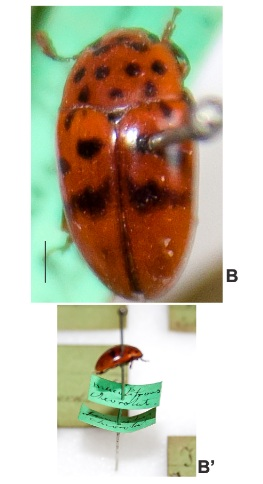
Maculosus form

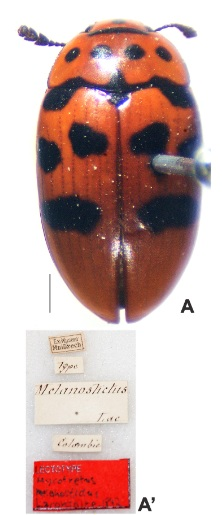
Melanostictus form

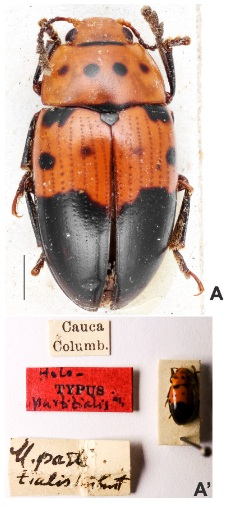
Partitialis form

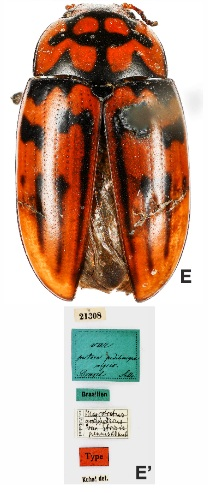
Strigipennis form

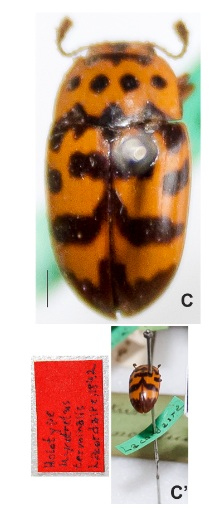
Terminalis form

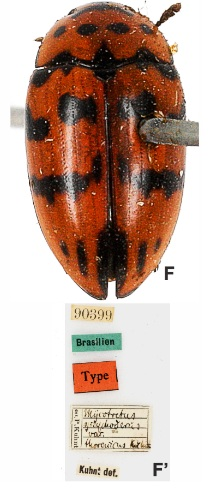
Thoracicus form

== Synonyms ==
The synonyms of M.ornatus are:

- Erotylus coronatus Duponchel, 1825
- Erotylus maculosus Duponchel, 1825
- Erotylus nigropunctatus Duponchel, 1825
- Erotylus ornatus Duponchel, 1825
- Erotylus puncticollis Duponchel, 1825
- Mycotretus cognatus Lacordaire, 1842
- Mycotretus coronatus (Duponchel, 1825)
- Mycotretus difficilis Lacordaire, 1842
- Mycotretus dispar Taschenberg, 1870
- Mycotretus dubius Lacordaire, 1842
- Mycotretus godarti Lacordaire, 1842
- Mycotretus graphoderus Lacordaire, 1842
- Mycotretus graphoderus graphoderus Lacordaire, 1842
- Mycotretus graphoderus strigipennis Kuhnt, 1910
- Mycotretus graphoderus thoracicus Kuhnt, 1910
- Mycotretus intermedius Lacordaire, 1842
- Mycotretus maculosus (Duponchel, 1825)
- Mycotretus melanostictus Lacordaire, 1842
- Mycotretus nigropunctatus (Duponchel, 1825)
- Mycotretus ornatus partitialis Deelder, 1942
- Mycotretus partitialis Mader, 1940
- Mycotretus posticus Lacordaire, 1842
- Mycotretus puncticollis (Duponchel, 1825)
- Mycotretus terminalis Lacordaire, 1842
