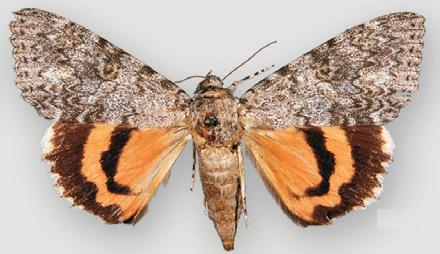
- Imago from above

Scientific classification
- Kingdom: Animalia
- Phylum: Arthropoda
- Clade: Pancrustacea
- Class: Insecta
- Order: Lepidoptera
- Superfamily: Noctuoidea
- Family: Erebidae
- Genus: Catocala
- Species: C. junctura

Binomial name
- Catocala junctura Walker, [1858]

Synonyms
- Numerous, see text

= Catocala junctura =

Joined underwing

Species of moth

Catocala junctura, the joined underwing or Stretch's underwing, is a moth in the family Erebidae. The species was first described by Francis Walker in 1858. It is found throughout temperate North America, ranging from New York and Pennsylvania west to Montana, Colorado, Oklahoma, Arizona, and into Texas, and north to southern Illinois, extreme southern Alberta and Saskatchewan; it has also been recorded west of the Rocky Mountains from California and south-eastern British Columbia. It is typically found near water, where the food plants of its caterpillar larvae grow plentifully.

== Description and ecology ==
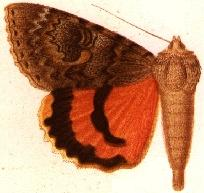
Upperside pattern of imago of the typical form

The wingspan is 70–75 mm or more. The forewings are grayish to brownish with prominent black bands above, and whitish below. The upperside of the hindwings is orange red, with two roughly concentric blackish bands on each wing, and lacking hairs at the base. The outer band separates a margin that is lighter in color than the rest of the upper hindwing. The inner band does not reach the trailing edge; its hindward tip forms a hook which points back at the wing base, or almost so. The underside of the hindwings is whitish along the leading edge; the trailing three-quarters of the wing are orange red. The inner black band is present on the underwings also. As in many relatives, the foreleg tibia of this species possess no spines, while the tarsi carry three rows of spines.

Adults are on the wing from June to September depending on the location. There is probably one generation per year. The caterpillars feed on willow species (Salix) and – in the west of their range – Fremont cottonwood (Populus fremontii).

== Classification ==
This moth is placed in the subfamily Catocalinae, either of the owlet moth family, Noctuidae, or – if the Noctuidae are circumscribed more strictly – of family Erebidae. Within the Catocalinae, it belongs to tribe Catocalini and – if the Noctuidae are circumscribed widely – subtribe Catocalina.

This species is probably related to other North American Catocala that feed on willow and cottonwood. If so, it is one of the rather few species of this radiation that ranges east of the Rocky Mountains.

=== Synonyms ===
In the past, the name Catocala aspasia had often been used for this species, but actually it seems to refer to the rather similar C. electilis.

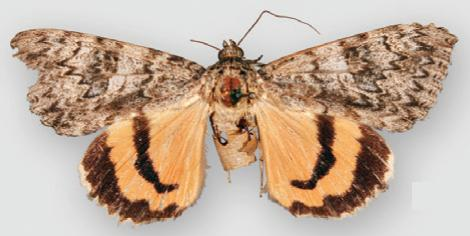
Imago of the augusta form from above

Many taxa described as distinct species or subspecies have recently been merged with C. junctura, and are considered mere forms without taxonomic rank; the alternate vernacular name "Stretch's underwing" in fact refers to one of these, the former C. stretchii. Not all authors have already adopted these changes, which are, however, probably warranted. The junior synonyms and other invalid taxa used for the joined underwing are thus:

- Catocala arizonae Grote, 1873
- Catocala arizonensis Strand, 1914
- Catocala aspasia sara French, 1883
- Catocala augusta H.Edwards, 1875
- Catocala elsa Beutenmüller, 1918
- Catocala huachuca Beutenmüller, 1918
- Catocala julietta French, 1916
- Catocala junctura augusta H.Edwards, 1875
- Catocala juncturana Strand, 1914
- Catocala juncturella Strand, 1914
- Catocala juncturelloides Strand, 1914
- Catocala margherita Beutenmüller, 1918
- Catocala portia H.Edwards, 1880
- Catocala roseata Cassino, 1919
- Catocala sara French, 1883
- Catocala stretchi (lapsus)
- Catocala stretchii Behr, 1870
- Catocala stretchii var. margherita Beutenmüller, 1918
- Catocala stretchii var. sierrae Beutenmüller, 1897
- Catocala walshi (lapsus)
- Catocala walshii Edwards, 1864
