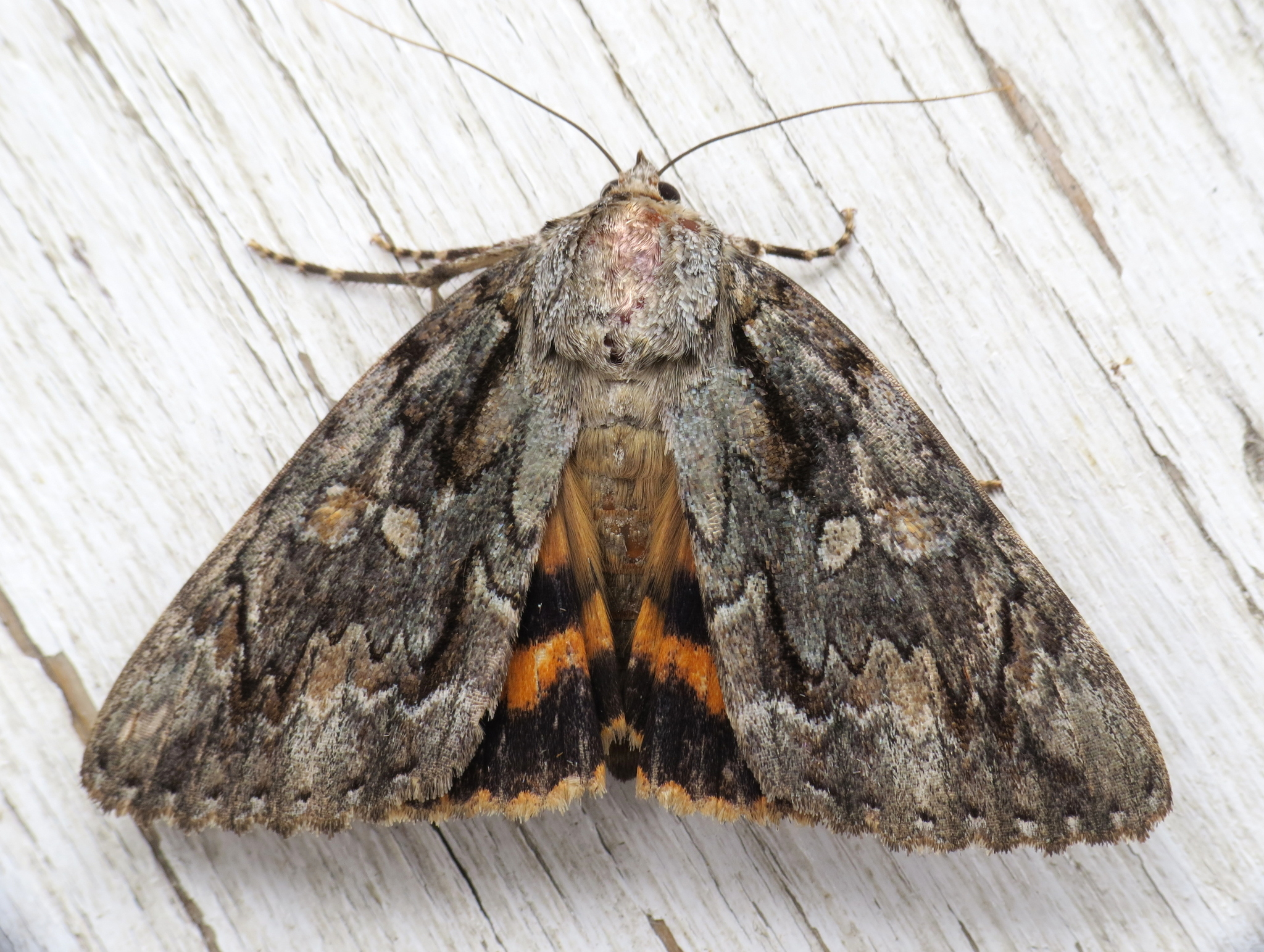
- Imago of C. neogama from Quarryville, New Brunswick, Canada

Scientific classification
- Kingdom: Animalia
- Phylum: Arthropoda
- Clade: Pancrustacea
- Class: Insecta
- Order: Lepidoptera
- Superfamily: Noctuoidea
- Family: Erebidae
- Genus: Catocala
- Species: C. neogama

Binomial name
- Catocala neogama (Smith in Smith & Abbot, 1797)

Synonyms
- Catocala arizonae (Strand, 1914, nec Grote, 1873: preoccupied); Catocala communis Grote, 1872; Catocala euphemia Beutenmüller, 1907; Catocala mildredae Franclemont, 1938; Catocala neogama loretta Barnes & McDunnough, 1918; Phalaena neogama Smith in Smith & Abbot, 1797

= Catocala neogama =

Bride

Species of moth

Catocala neogama, the bride, is a moth in the family Erebidae first described by James Edward Smith in 1797. It is found in North America east of the Rocky Mountains, from Maine and Quebec south to northern Florida and west to South Dakota, New Mexico, and into Arizona and Texas. Its westernmost population from the semiarid Colorado Plateau region is rather distinct and was once considered a separate species, but is now regarded as a well-marked subspecies C. n. euphemia.

== Description and ecology ==
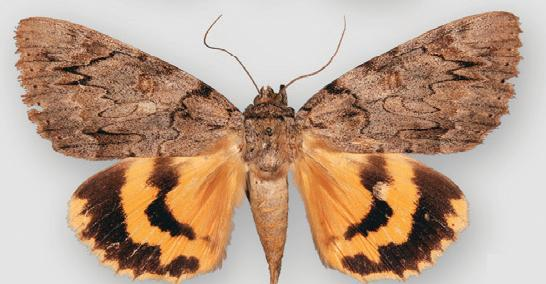
Lectotype specimen of C. n. euphemia from above

The wingspan is 70–85 mm; C. n. euphemia is distinctly larger (around 90 mm). The forewings are brownish gray above, evenly dark from base to tip or with the center somewhat darker, and varying geographically between somewhat paler and browner in the aridland population and darker gray marked with brown in the eastern individuals (see Gloger's rule). The hindwings are conspicuously colored in various hues of orange with roughly concentric black markings above. Their basal area carries a dense covering of thin dark hairs which stretches along the dorsum, making this area appear more brownish or reddish. Through the hindwing center runs a black band from the leading almost to the trailing edge; a similar but wider band runs close to and parallel with the termen from apex to tornus. The border of the black bands with the fairly narrow area of orange between them is not even, but has some deep and irregular scallops. The outer rim of the hindwing is lighter yellow than the rest; along the wing veins the outer black band extends to the termen as faint blackish stripes. The undersides are pale yellowish orange with black bands. As is typical for the hickory/walnut-feeding Catocala of North America, both foreleg and hindleg tibiae of this species are spiny, and the tarsi carry four rows of irregular rows of spines each.

The old wife underwing (C. palaeogama, see below) is most easily distinguished by the thickly hairy hindwing bases – below as well as above, forming a fuzzy black patch on the upperwings – and the less scalloped, more angular orange/black border on the hindwing upperside. It is also distinctly smaller, with little or no overlap in wingspan.

Adults of the nominate subspecies are found from June to October; C. n. euphemia adults are on the wing from July to August. The caterpillars feed on Juglandeae trees of the genera Juglans (walnut trees) – such as the butternut tree (J. cinerea) – and Carya (hickories). The westernmost population apparently does not feed on Carya (which is rare or absent in their range), and seems effectively to be limited to Arizona black walnut (J. major), and perhaps Texas black walnut (J. microcarpa) and their hybrids.

== Classification ==
This moth is placed in the subfamily Catocalinae, either of the owlet moth family, Noctuidae, or – if the Noctuidae are circumscribed more strictly – of family Erebidae. Within the Catocalinae, it belongs to tribe Catocalini and – if the Noctuidae are circumscribed widely – subtribe Catocalina.

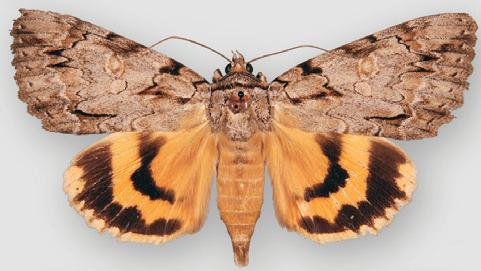
Imago of C. n. neogama f. loretta from above

The supposed C. euphemia was described surprisingly recently, over 100 years after the nominate C. neogama. This population, occurring in Arizona and New Mexico, differs visually from bride moths as originally described, and was for many decades held to be a distinct species. However, its range is altogether parapatric with that of the eastern bride moths, and the ecological differences are slight. Consequently, pending data to the contrary these two are held to be subspecies of one species now, with C. n. euphemia representing a range expansion (and perhaps even a post-Pleistocene one) outside the range of Carya.

On the other hand, similar moths from Texas were described as subspecies C. n. loretta. They often are paler than C. n. euphemia if anything; however, except in lightness they resemble C. n. neogama even more strongly, and they do not form a geographically separate and distinct population. They are thus today treated as a pale local form of the nominate subspecies, with no formal taxonomic standing.

Finally, some authors include the old wife underwing (C. palaeogama) in C. neogama. These two are recognizably distinct in appearance and widely sympatric however, and there is no good indication that they are just one species. In fact, C. neogama occurs at the type locality of C. palaeogama (the area around Baltimore, Maryland), while the southern limit of C. palaeogama (South Carolina) is around the type locality of the supposed C. communis, which was subsequently identified as specimens of C. neogama.
