= Infraspecific name =

Name of a taxon, at a rank lower than species

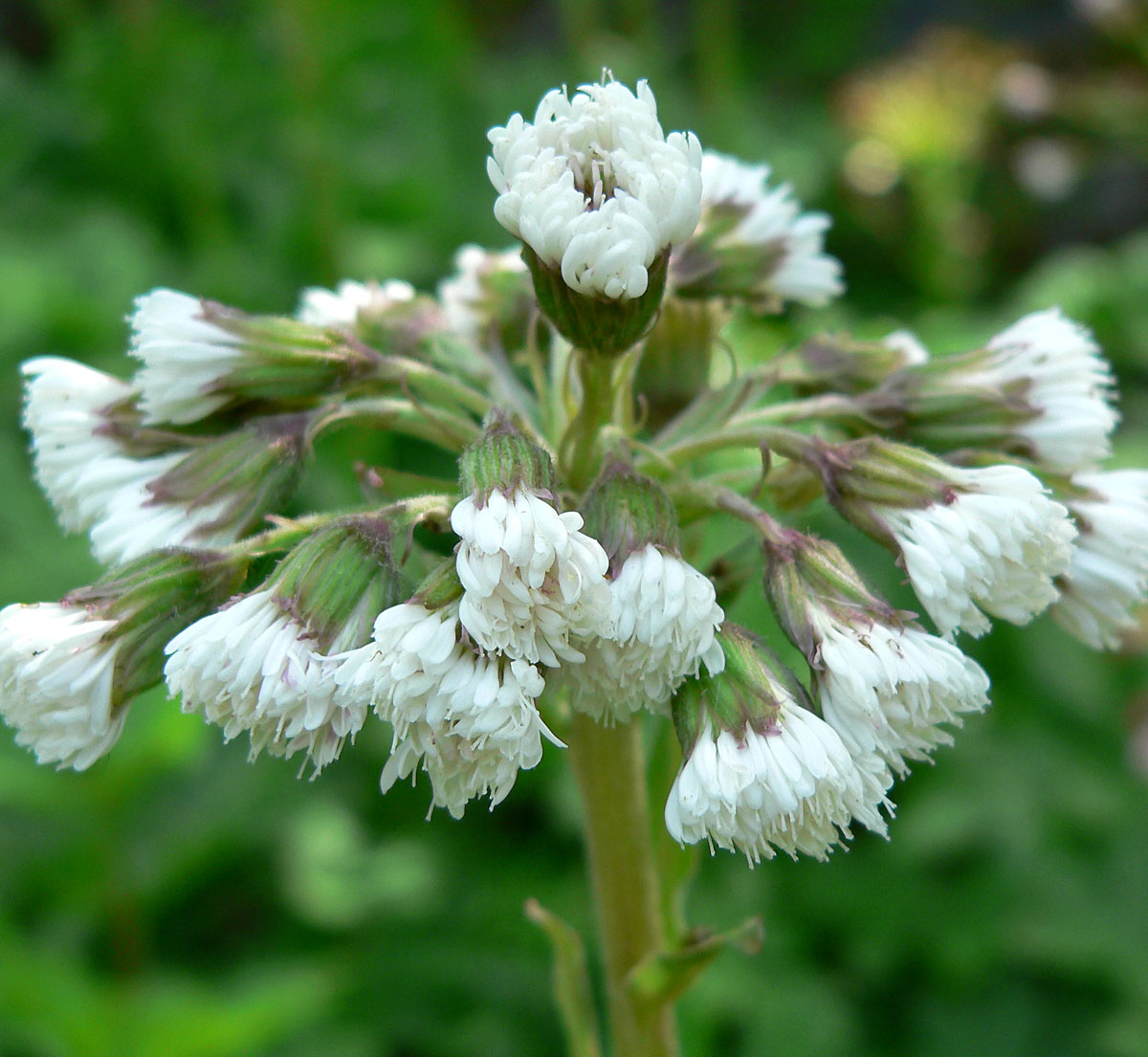
Photo of Petasites frigidus var. palmatus at the Regional Parks Botanic Garden, Berkeley, California

In botany, an infraspecific name is the scientific name for any taxon below the rank of species, i.e. an infraspecific taxon or infraspecies. The scientific names of botanical taxa are regulated by the International Code of Nomenclature for algae, fungi, and plants (ICN). As specified by the ICN, the name of an infraspecific taxon is a combination of the name of a species and an infraspecific epithet, separated by a connecting term that denotes the rank of the taxon. An example of an infraspecific name is Astrophytum myriostigma subvar. glabrum, the name of a subvariety of the species Astrophytum myriostigma (bishop's hat cactus). In the previous example, glabrum is the infraspecific epithet.

Names below the rank of species of animals and of cultivated plants are regulated by different codes of nomenclature and are formed somewhat differently.

== Construction of infraspecific names ==
Article 24 of the ICN describes how infraspecific names are constructed. The order of the three parts of an infraspecific name is:

genus name, specific epithet, connecting term indicating the rank (not part of the name, but required), infraspecific epithet.

It is customary to italicize all three parts of such a name, but not the connecting term. For example:

- Acanthocalycium klimpelianum var. macranthum

genus name = Acanthocalycium, specific epithet = klimpelianum, connecting term = var. (short for "varietas" or variety), infraspecific epithet = macranthum

- Astrophytum myriostigma subvar. glabrum

genus name = Astrophytum, specific epithet = myriostigma, connecting term = subvar. (short for "subvarietas" or subvariety), infraspecific epithet = glabrum

The recommended abbreviations for ranks below species are:

- subspecies - recommended abbreviation: subsp. (but "ssp." is also in use although not recognised by Art 26)
- varietas (variety) - recommended abbreviation: var.
- subvarietas (subvariety) - recommended abbreviation: subvar.
- forma (form) - recommended abbreviation: f.
- subforma (subform) - recommended abbreviation: subf.

Although the connecting terms mentioned above are the recommended ones, the ICN allows for other connecting terms in validly published infraspecific taxa. It specifically mentions that Greek letters α, β, γ, etc. can be used in this way in the original document and further ranks may be added without limit. Names that use these connecting terms are now deprecated (though still legal), but they have an importance because they can be basionyms of current species. The commonest cases use "β" and "b"; examples mentioned in the ICN are Cynoglossum cheirifolium β Anchusa (lanata) and Polyporus fomentarius β applanatus whilst other examples (coming from the fungus database Index Fungorum) are Agaricus plexipes b fuliginaria and Peziza capula ß cernua. The ICN allows the possibility that a validly published name could have no defined rank and uses "[unranked]" as the connecting term in such cases.

== Abbreviation of infraspecific names ==
Like specific epithets, infraspecific epithets cannot be used in isolation as names. Thus the name of a particular species of Acanthocalycium is Acanthocalycium klimpelianum, which can be abbreviated to A. klimpelianum where the context makes the genus clear. The species cannot be referred to as just klimpelianum. In the same way, the name of a particular variety of Acanthocalycium klimpelianum is Acanthocalycium klimpelianum var. macranthum, which can be abbreviated to A. k. var. macranthum where the context makes the species clear. The variety cannot be referred to as just macranthum.

Sometimes more than three parts will be given; strictly speaking, this is not a name, but a classification. The ICN gives the example of Saxifraga aizoon var. aizoon subvar. brevifolia f. multicaulis subf. surculosa; the name of the subform would be Saxifraga aizoon subf. surculosa.

== Legitimate infraspecific names ==
For a proposed infraspecific name to be legitimate it must be in accordance with all the rules of the ICN. Only some of the main points are described here.

A key concept in botanical names is that of a type. In many cases the type will be a particular preserved specimen stored in a herbarium, although there are other kinds of type. Like other names, an infraspecific name is attached to a type. Whether a plant should be given a particular infraspecific name can then be decided by comparing it to the type.

There is no requirement for a species to be divided into infraspecific taxa, of whatever rank; in other words, a species does not have to have subspecies, varieties, forms, etc. However, if infraspecific ranks are created, then the name of the type of the species must repeat the specific epithet as its infraspecific epithet. The type acquires this name automatically as soon as any infraspecific rank is created. As an example, consider Poa secunda J.Presl, whose type specimen is in the Wisconsin State Herbarium.

- As soon as a subspecies of Poa secunda was created, then the type specimen of P. secunda immediately became the type specimen of Poa secunda subsp. secunda. The name "Poa secunda subsp. secunda" was automatically created (it is an "autonym"). Soreng created the subspecies Poa secunda subsp. juncifolia (whose type specimen is also in the Wisconsin State Herbarium), thereby making the type specimen of P. secunda also the type specimen of Poa secunda subsp. secunda.
- If in addition to the subspecies any variety of Poa secunda were to be created, then the type specimen of P. secunda would automatically become the type specimen of Poa secunda var. secunda. The type specimen would then have the classification Poa secunda subsp. secunda var. secunda.

The same epithet can be used again within a species, at whatever level, only if the names with the re-used epithet are attached to the same type. Thus there can be a form called Poa secunda f. juncifolia as well as the subspecies Poa secunda subsp. juncifolia if, and only if, the type specimen of Poa secunda f. juncifolia is the same as the type specimen of Poa secunda subsp. juncifolia (in other words, if there is a single type specimen whose classification is Poa secunda subsp. juncifolia f. juncifolia).

If two infraspecific taxa which have different types are accidentally given the same epithet, then a homonym has been created. The earliest published name is the legitimate one and the other must be changed.

== Specifying authors ==
When indicating authors for infraspecific names, it is possible to show either just the author(s) of the final, infraspecific epithet, or the authors of both the specific and the infraspecific epithets, as is demonstrated throughout the ICN. Examples:

- Adenia aculeata subsp. inermis de Wilde
  - This identifies de Wilde as the author who published this name for the subspecies (i.e. who created the epithet inermis). Note that here it was decided not to indicate authority for the species.
- Pinus nigra J.F.Arnold subsp. salzmannii (Dunal) Franco
  - Here, J.F.Arnold is the author who gave the species, European black pine, its botanical name Pinus nigra; Dunal is the author who was the first to publish the epithet salzmanii for this taxon (as the species Pinus salzmanii); Franco is the author who reduced the taxon to a subspecies of Pinus nigra.

== Difference from zoological nomenclature ==
In zoological nomenclature, names of taxa below species rank are formed somewhat differently, using a trinomen or 'trinomial name'. No connecting term is required as there is only one rank below species, the subspecies.

== Difference from prokaryotic nomenclature ==
The Prokaryotic Code was split from the ICN in 1975. This nomenclature only governs one infraspecific rank, the subspecies, but allows a number of infrasubspecific subdivisions to be used. The authorship is to be specified in the form "Bacillus subtilis subsp. spizizenii Nakamura et al. 1999.", i.e. with only the infraspecific author.

Authors may still choose to use ungoverned ranks such as sv. (serovar) and pv. (pathovar).

== Cultivated plants ==
The ICN does not regulate the names of cultivated plants, of cultivars, i.e. plants specifically created for use in agriculture or horticulture. Such names are regulated by the International Code of Nomenclature for Cultivated Plants (ICNCP).

Although logically below the rank of species (and hence "infraspecific"), a cultivar name may be attached to any scientific name at the genus level or below. The minimum requirement is to specify a genus name. For example, Achillea 'Cerise Queen' is a cultivar; Pinus nigra 'Arnold Sentinel' is a cultivar of the species P. nigra (which is propagated vegetatively, by cloning).

== See also ==
- International Code of Zoological Nomenclature
- International Code of Nomenclature for Cultivated Plants
- Cultivar
- Strain (biology)
- Race (taxonomy)
- Variant (biology)
- Forma specialis, an informal naming system for parasites that is included in the botanical code of nomenclature
- Pathovar, a system for naming parasitic bacteria

== Bibliography ==
- Turland, N.J.; et al., eds. (2017), International Code of Nomenclature for algae, fungi, and plants (Shenzhen Code) adopted by the Nineteenth International Botanical Congress Shenzhen, China, July 2017, vol. Regnum Vegetabile 154 (electronic ed.), Glashütten: International Association for Plant Taxonomy
