= C. communis =

C. communis may refer to:

- Catocala communis, a synonym for Catocala neogama, the bride, a moth of the family Noctuidae
- Commelina communis, the Asiatic dayflower, an herbaceous annual plant in the dayflower family

== See also ==
- Communis (disambiguation)
