= Subvariety =

Subvariety may refer to:

- Subvariety (botany)
- Subvariety (algebraic geometry)
- Variety (universal algebra)
