= Subrace =

Subrace may refer to:

- Subrace, a taxonomic rank below race (taxonomy)
- Subrace, a particular variety of a race (fantasy)
