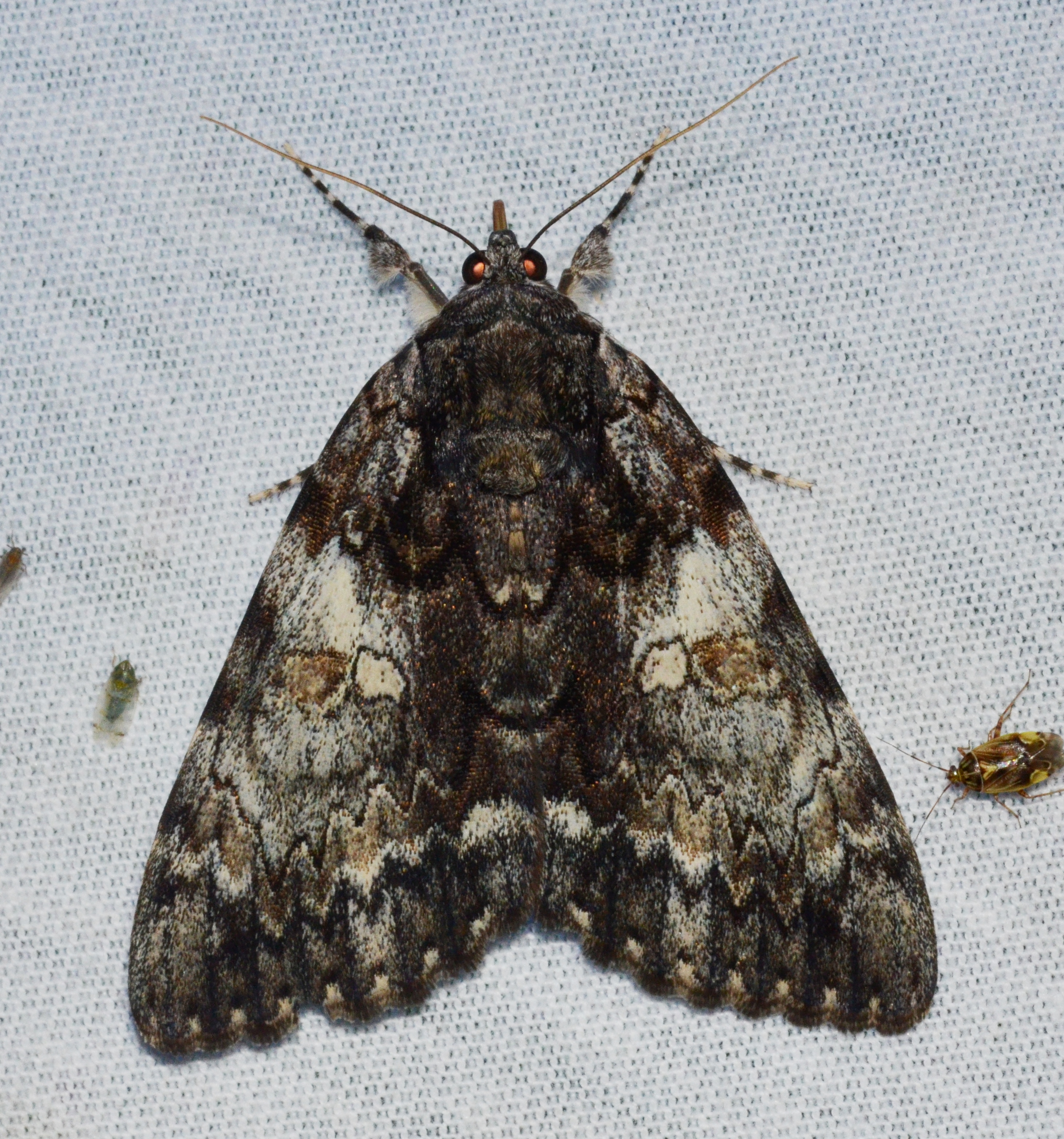

Scientific classification
- Kingdom: Animalia
- Phylum: Arthropoda
- Class: Insecta
- Order: Lepidoptera
- Superfamily: Noctuoidea
- Family: Erebidae
- Genus: Catocala
- Species: C. palaeogama

Binomial name
- Catocala palaeogama Guenée, 1852

Synonyms
- Catabapta paleogama; Catocala annida Fager, 1882; Catocala snowiana Grote, 1876; Catocala neogama snoviana; Catocala palaeogama annida; Catocala palaeogama var. phalanga Grote, 1864

= Catocala palaeogama =

Old wife underwing

Species of moth

Catocala palaeogama, the old wife underwing, is a moth of the family Erebidae. The species was first described by Achille Guenée in 1852. It is found in North America from Ontario and Quebec (where it is rare), through Maine, New Jersey, Tennessee, to South Carolina, west to Arkansas and Oklahoma and north through Iowa, Indiana, Illinois and Michigan.

Some authors consider Catocala palaeogama to be a synonym of Catocala neogama.

The wingspan is 60–70 mm. Adults are on wing from June to October depending on the location. There is probably one generation per year.

The larvae feed on Carya alba, C. glabra, C. illinoinensis, C. laciniosa, C. ovalis, C. ovata, Castanea dentata, Juglans nigra and Malus pumila.
