= Form (botany) =

Secondary taxonomic rank in botanical nomenclature

The hierarchy of biological classification's eight major taxonomic ranks. Intermediate minor rankings are not shown.

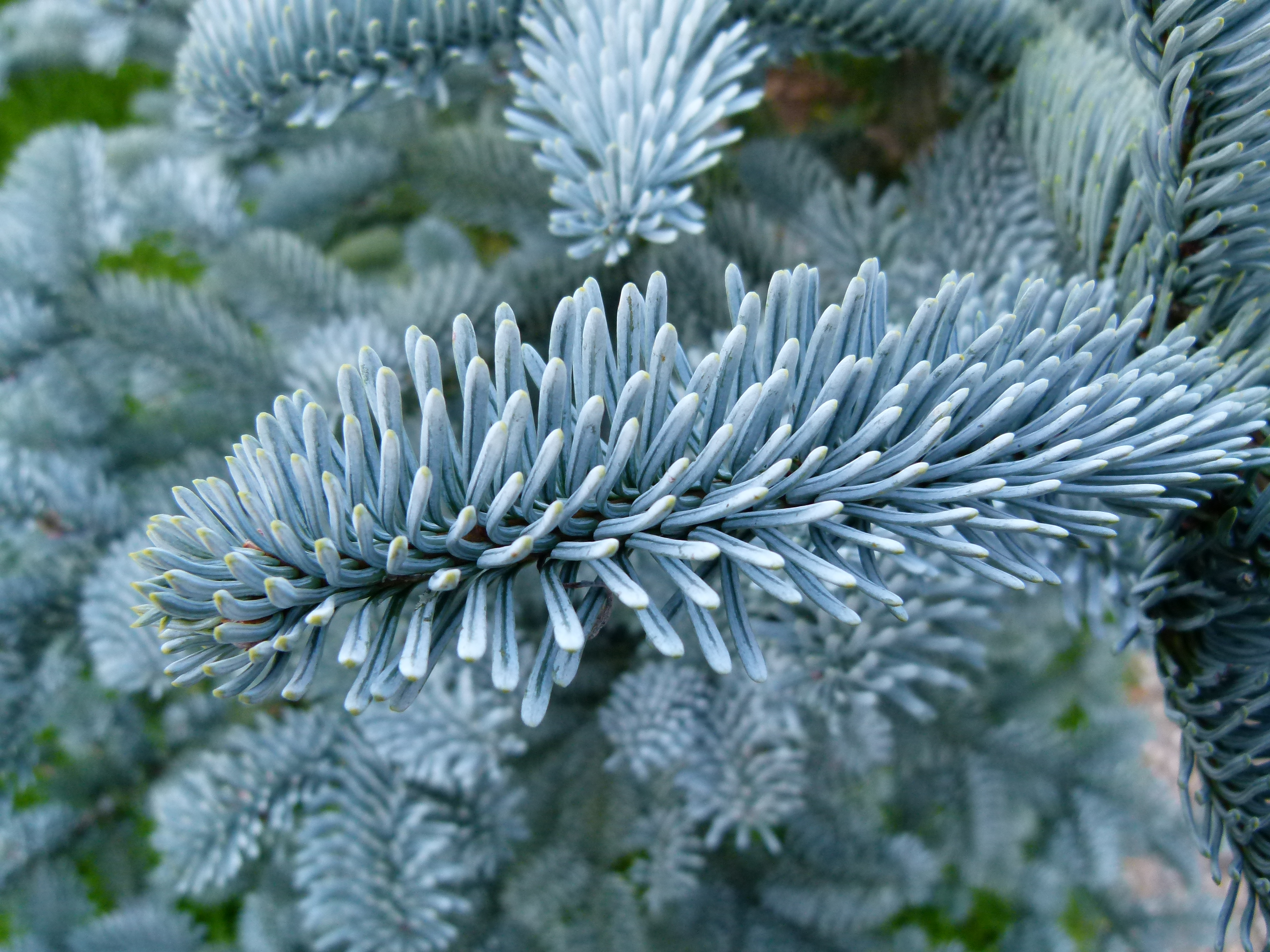
Seedlings of Abies procera sometimes arise that have attractive silvery-blue foliage. The name Abies procera Rehder forma glauca (Ravenscr.) Rehder has been created for these. However, if the plants are selectively propagated for the horticulture trade, a cultivar name is generally used instead.

In botanical nomenclature, a form (Latin: forma, plural: formae) is one of the "secondary" taxonomic ranks, below that of variety, which in turn is below that of subspecies and species; it is an infraspecific taxon. If more than three ranks are listed in describing a taxon, the "classification" is being specified, but only three parts make up the name of the taxon: a genus name, a specific epithet, and an infraspecific epithet.

The abbreviation "f." or the full Latin word "forma" should be put before the infraspecific epithet to indicate the rank—neither the abbreviation nor full Latin word are italicized when used as a connecting term in a scientific name.

For example:

- Acanthocalycium spiniflorum f. klimpelianum or
  - Acanthocalycium spiniflorum forma klimpelianum (Weidlich & Werderm.) Donald
- Crataegus aestivalis (Walter) Torr. & A.Gray var. cerasoides Sarg. f. luculenta Sarg. is a classification of a plant whose name is:
  - Crataegus aestivalis (Walter) Torr. & A.Gray f. luculenta Sarg.

A form usually designates a group with a noticeable morphological deviation. The usual taxonomic practice is that the individuals classified within the form are not necessarily known to be closely related (they may not form a clade). For instance, white-flowered plants of species that usually have coloured flowers can be grouped and named (e.g., as "f. alba"). Formae apomicticae are sometimes named among plants that reproduce asexually, by apomixis. There are theoretically countless numbers of forms based on minor genetic differences, and only a few that have particular significance are likely to be named.

== See also ==
- Form (zoology)
- Forma specialis, an informal rank used for a parasitic form adapted to a particular host
- Trinomial nomenclature
- Variety (botany)
- Subvariety
- Plant variety (disambiguation)
- Cultivar
- Hybrid (biology)
- Race (taxonomy)
