= Race (taxonomy) =

Informal rank in the taxonomic hierarchy, below the level of subspecies

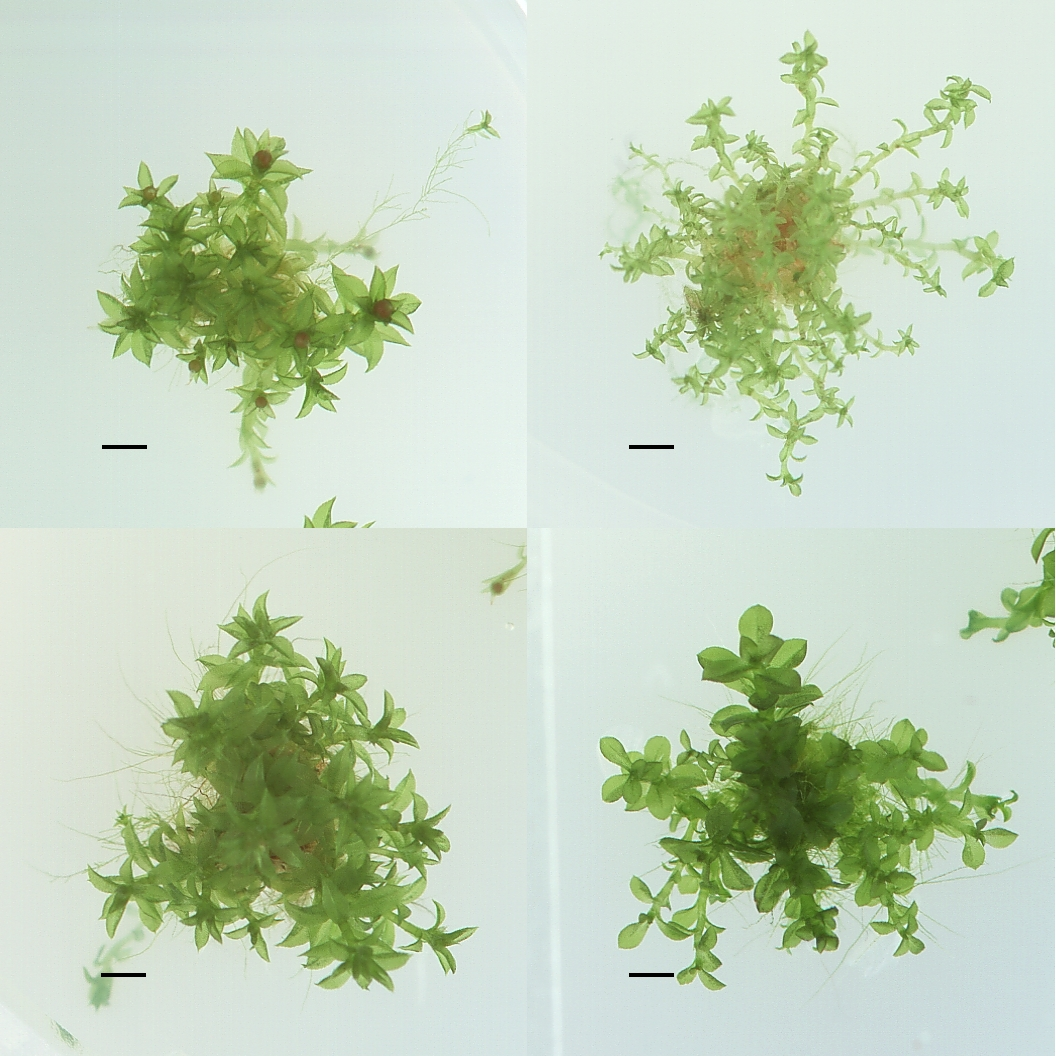
Four different ecotypes, i.e. ecological races, of the species Physcomitrella patens, stored at the International Moss Stock Center

In biological taxonomy, race is an informal rank in the taxonomic hierarchy for which various definitions exist. Sometimes it is used to denote a level below that of subspecies, while at other times it is used as a synonym for subspecies. It has been used as a higher rank than strain, with several strains making up one race. Races may be genetically distinct populations of individuals within the same species, or they may be defined in other ways, e.g. geographically, or physiologically. Genetic isolation between races is not complete, but genetic differences may have accumulated that are not (yet) sufficient to separate species.

The term is recognized by some, but not governed by any of the formal codes of biological nomenclature. Taxonomic units below the level of subspecies are not typically applied to animals.

== Other terms ==
In botany, the Latin words stirps and proles were traditionally used, and proles was recommended in the first botanical Code of Nomenclature, published in 1868.

== Definitional approaches ==
Races are defined according to any identifiable characteristic, including gene frequencies. "Race differences are relative, not absolute." Adaptive differences that distinguish races can accumulate even with substantial gene flow and clinal (rather than discrete) habitat variation. Hybrid zones between races are semi-permeable barriers to gene flow, see for example the chromosome races of the Auckland tree wētā.

Chromosomal race
A population distinguished by having a unique karyotype, i.e., different chromosome numbers (ploidy), or different chromosome structure.
Geographical race
A distinct population that is isolated in a particular area from other populations of a species, and consistently distinguishable from the others, e.g. morphology (or even only genetically). Geographic races are allopatric.
Physiological race
A group of individuals that do not necessarily differ in morphology from other members of the species, but have identifiably different physiology or behaviour. A physiological race may be an ecotype, part of a species that is adapted to a different local habitat, defined even by a specific food source. Parasitic species, often tied to no geographic location, frequently have races that are adapted to different hosts, but difficult to distinguish chromosomally.

In botany, where physiological race (mostly used in mycology), biological race, and biological form have been used synonymously, a physiological race is essentially the same classification as a forma specialis, except the latter is used as part of the infraspecific scientific name (and follows Latin-based scientific naming conventions), inserted after the interpolation "f. sp.", as in "Puccinia graminis f. sp. avenae"; while the name of a race is added after the binomial scientific name (and may be arbitrary, e.g. an alphanumeric code, usually with the word "race"): "Podosphaera xanthii race S".

A physiological race is not to be confused with a physiologic race, an obsolete term for cryptic species. Neither biological form nor forma specialis should be confused with the formal botanical taxonomic rank of forma or form, or with the zoological term form, an informal description (often seasonal) which is not taxonomic.

The term race has also historically been used in relation to domesticated animals, as another term for breed; this usage survives in combining form, in the term landrace, also applied to domesticated plants. The cognate words for race in many languages (Spanish: raza; German: Rasse; French: race) may convey meanings the English word does not, and are frequently used in the sense of 'domestic breed'.

== Distinguishing from other taxonomic ranks ==
If the races are sufficiently different or if they have been tested to show little genetic connection regardless of phenotype, two or more groups/races can be identified as subspecies or (in botany, mycology, and phycology) another infraspecific rank, and given a name. Ernst Mayr wrote that a subspecies can be "a geographic race that is sufficiently different taxonomically to be worthy of a separate name."

Study of populations preliminarily labelled races may sometimes lead to classification of a new species. For example, in 2008, two populations of the brown planthopper (Nilaparvata lugens) in the Philippines, one adapted to feeding on rice, and another on Leersia hexandra grass, were reclassified from races into "two distinct, but very closely allied, sympatric species", based on poor survival rate when given the opposite food source, barriers to hybridization between the populations, uniform preference for mating between members of the same population, differences in mating sounds, oviposition variances, and other distinguishable characteristics.

For pathogenic bacteria adapted to particular hosts, races can be formally named as pathovars. For parasitic organisms governed by the International Code of Nomenclature for algae, fungi, and plants, the term forma specialis (plural formae speciales) is used.

== In mycology and phytopathology ==
Classification of fungal microbes into races is done frequently in mycology, the study of fungi, and especially in phytopathology, the study of plant diseases, which are often fungal. The term "physiologic race" was recommended for use over "biologic form" at the International Botanical Congress of 1935. Although historically the term has been used inconsistently by plant pathologists, the modern trend is to use race to refer to "groups of host genotypes permitting characterization of virulence" (in simpler terms: grouping the parasitic fungi into races based on how strongly they affect particular host plants).

Commercial Cucumis melo (cantaloupe and muskmelon) production, for example, has been engaged in a biological "arms race", since 1925, against cucurbit powdery mildew, caused by successively arising races of Podosphaera xanthii fungus, with new cultivars of melons being developed for resistance to these pathogens.

A 2004 literature review of this issue concluded that "race identification is important for basic research and is especially important for the commercial seed industry", but was seen as having little utility in horticulture for choosing specific cultivars, because of the rapidity with which the local pathogen population can change geographically, seasonally, and by host plant.

Classification of fungal races can be difficult because host plants' responses to particular populations of fungi can be affected by humidity, light, temperature, and other environmental factors; different host plants may not all respond to particular fungal populations or vice versa; and identification of genetic differences between populations thought to form distinct fungal races can be elusive.

== See also ==
- Breed
- Cultivar
- Intergradation
- Plant variety (several definitions)
- Population
- Ring species
- Species complex
