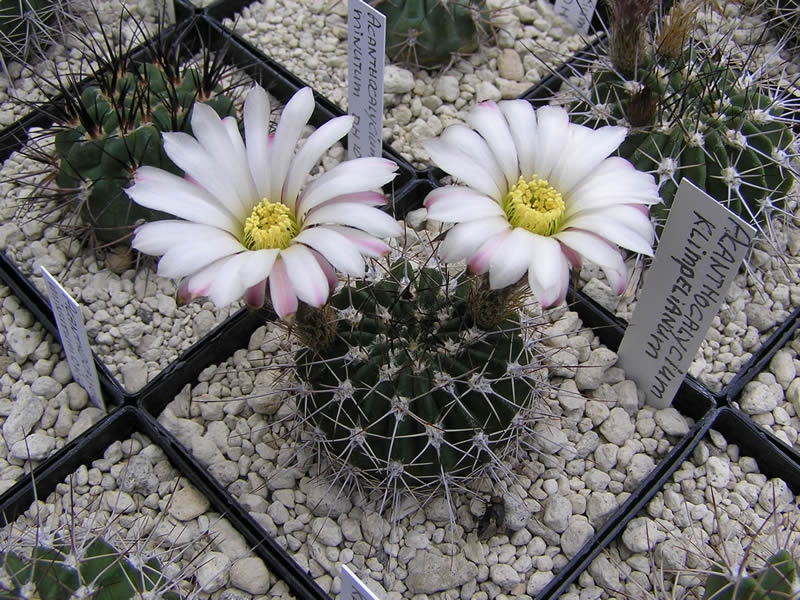

Scientific classification
- Kingdom: Plantae
- Clade: Tracheophytes
- Clade: Angiosperms
- Clade: Eudicots
- Order: Caryophyllales
- Family: Cactaceae
- Subfamily: Cactoideae
- Genus: Acanthocalycium
- Species: A. klimpelianum

Binomial name
- Acanthocalycium klimpelianum (Weidlich & Werderm.) Backeb. 1935

= Acanthocalycium klimpelianum =

Species of cactus

Acanthocalycium klimpelianum is a species of Acanthocalycium from Argentina.
