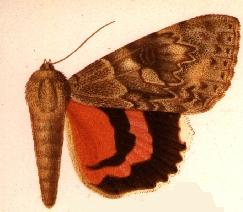

Scientific classification
- Kingdom: Animalia
- Phylum: Arthropoda
- Class: Insecta
- Order: Lepidoptera
- Superfamily: Noctuoidea
- Family: Erebidae
- Genus: Catocala
- Species: C. electilis

Binomial name
- Catocala electilis Walker, 1858

Synonyms
- Catocala aspasia Strecker, 1874; Catocala cassandra H. Edwards, 1875; Catocala electilella Strand, 1914

= Catocala electilis =

Species of moth

Catocala electilis is a moth of the family Erebidae. It is found in Arizona and Mexico.

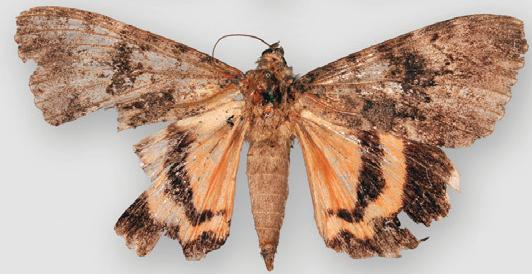
lectotype of Catocala cassandra, now considered a synonym of Catocala electilis

The larvae feed on Populus fremontii.
