= Plant variety =

Plant variety may refer to:

- Variety (botany), a formal rank, in taxonomic nomenclature, below subspecies
- Colloquially (and historically):
  - Cultivar, especially of grapes and rice
  - Hybrid (biology), more generally
  - Any form (botany) (a taxonomic rank below variety)
- Plant variety (law), a non-taxonomic term of legal recognition

== See also ==
- Varietal, a wine labeled by the grape variety used to make it
- Variety (disambiguation), other types of variety
