= Form (zoology) =

Informal zoology term

In zoology, form (Latin: forma) is a strictly informal term that is sometimes used to describe organisms. Under the International Code of Zoological Nomenclature the term has no standing (it is not accepted). In other words, although form names are Latin, and are sometimes wrongly appended to a binomial name, in a zoological context, forms do not have any taxonomic significance; such names are unavailable, do not have authors or dates, and do not compete for homonymy.

== Usage of the term ==
Some zoologists use the word "form" or "forma" to describe variation in animals, especially insects, as part of a series of terms and abbreviations that are appended to the binomen or trinomen. Many "typical specimens" may be described, but none should be considered absolute, unconditional or categorical. Forms have no official status, though they are sometimes useful in describing altitudinal or geographical clines. As opposed to morphs (see below), a subpopulation usually consists of a single form only at any given point of time.

forma geographica - f. geogr.
If used, nowadays usually denotes a part of a cline; for example for intergrades between subspecies in their area of contact.
forma localis - f. loc.
As "f. geogr." but only local, more restricted in occurrence.
forma alta - f. alt.
Altitudinal features are not necessarily inherited, but may entirely be due to environment. The same applies to temperature or humidity-generated forms, such as:
- forma vernalis - f. vern. (spring form)
- forma aestivalis - f. aest. (summer form)
- forma autumnalis - f. autumn. (autumn form)
aberratio - ab.
May be used for a single individual, for a small group such as an individual and its offspring, or for atypical individuals (for example, albinos). It can also used for commonly observed forms of a species, but in this case, use of forma (f.) or morpha, accompanied by a descriptive name, is more conventional.

Notes:

- A morph is a similar concept with a less restricted occurrence. As neither forms nor morphs are officially recognised terminology in zoology, application can vary but, generally, morphs occur without geographical or seasonal restriction, and may constitute a significant part of the population; usually, several morphs co-occur in a single subpopulation at a given time. A well known example is the peppered moth.
- Botanical nomenclature is much more complex, with the use of varieties, subvarieties, and forms being formally regulated by the ICBN.

== See also ==
- Polymorphism
- Race
- Subspecies
