= Subspecies =

Taxonomic rank subordinate to species

The hierarchy of biological classification's eight major taxonomic ranks. Intermediate minor rankings are not shown.

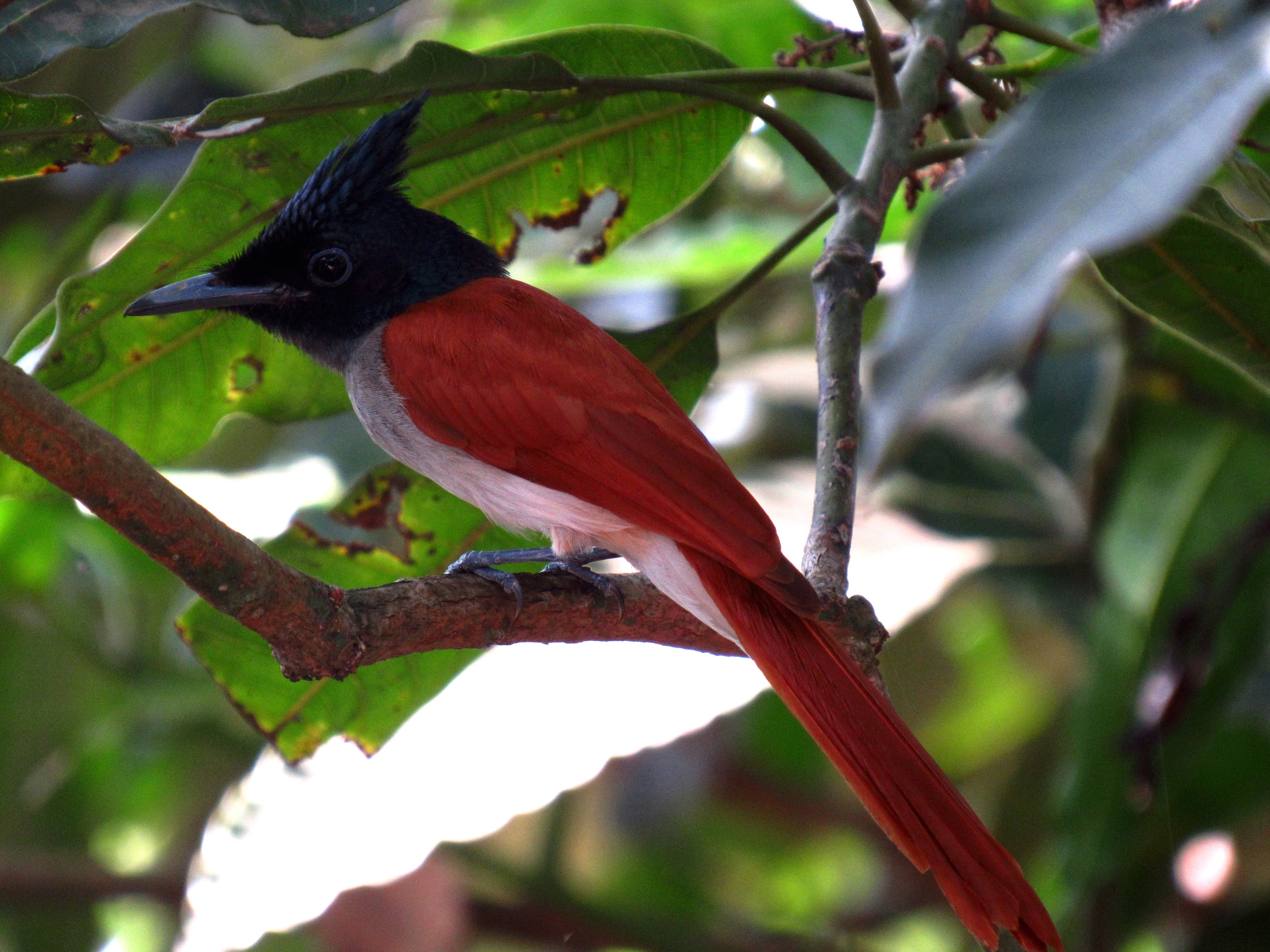
Ceylon paradise flycatcher (Terpsiphone paradisi ceylonensis), an Indian paradise flycatcher subspecies native to Sri Lanka

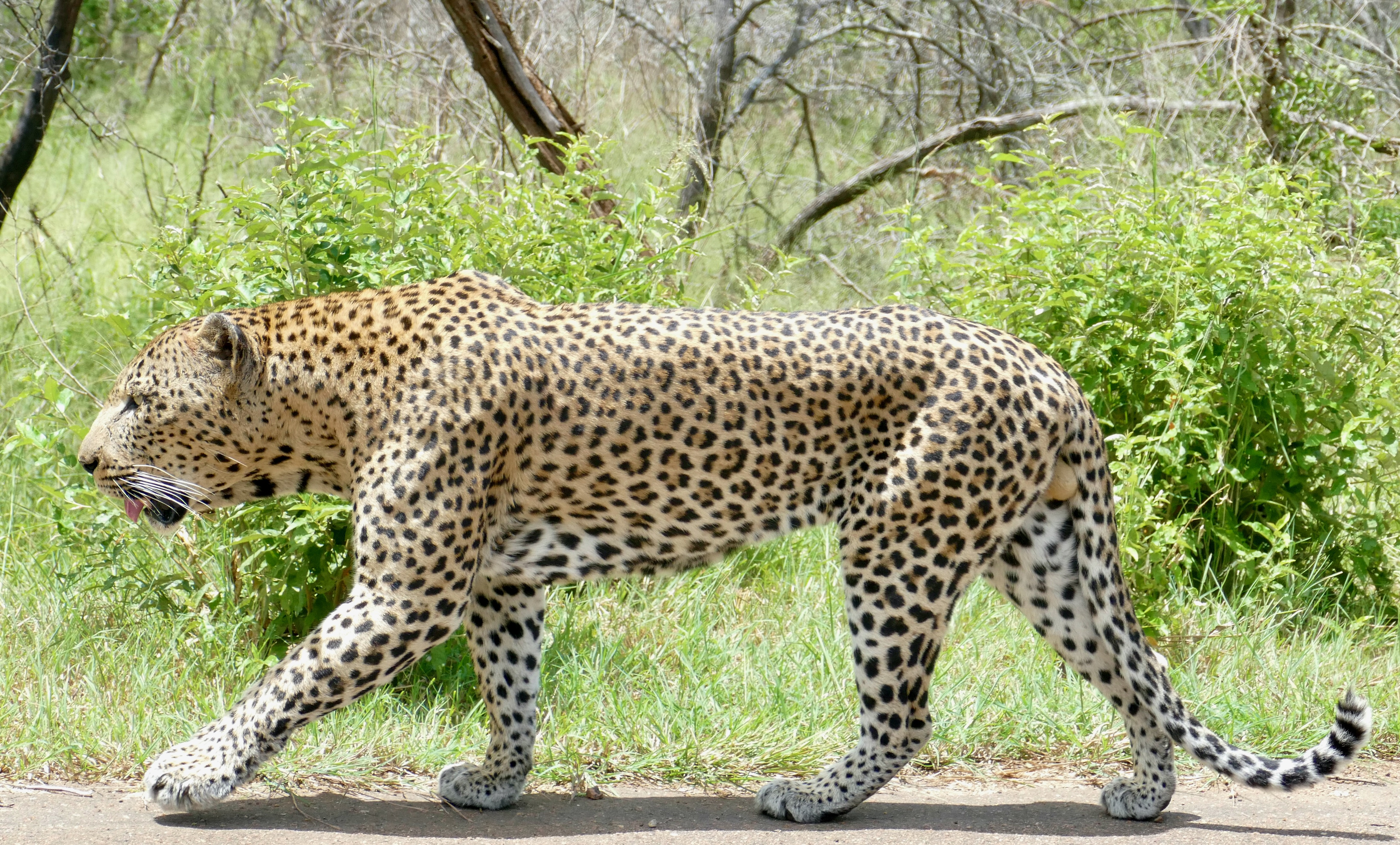
African leopard (Panthera pardus pardus), the nominotypical (nominate or definitive) leopard subspecies native to Africa

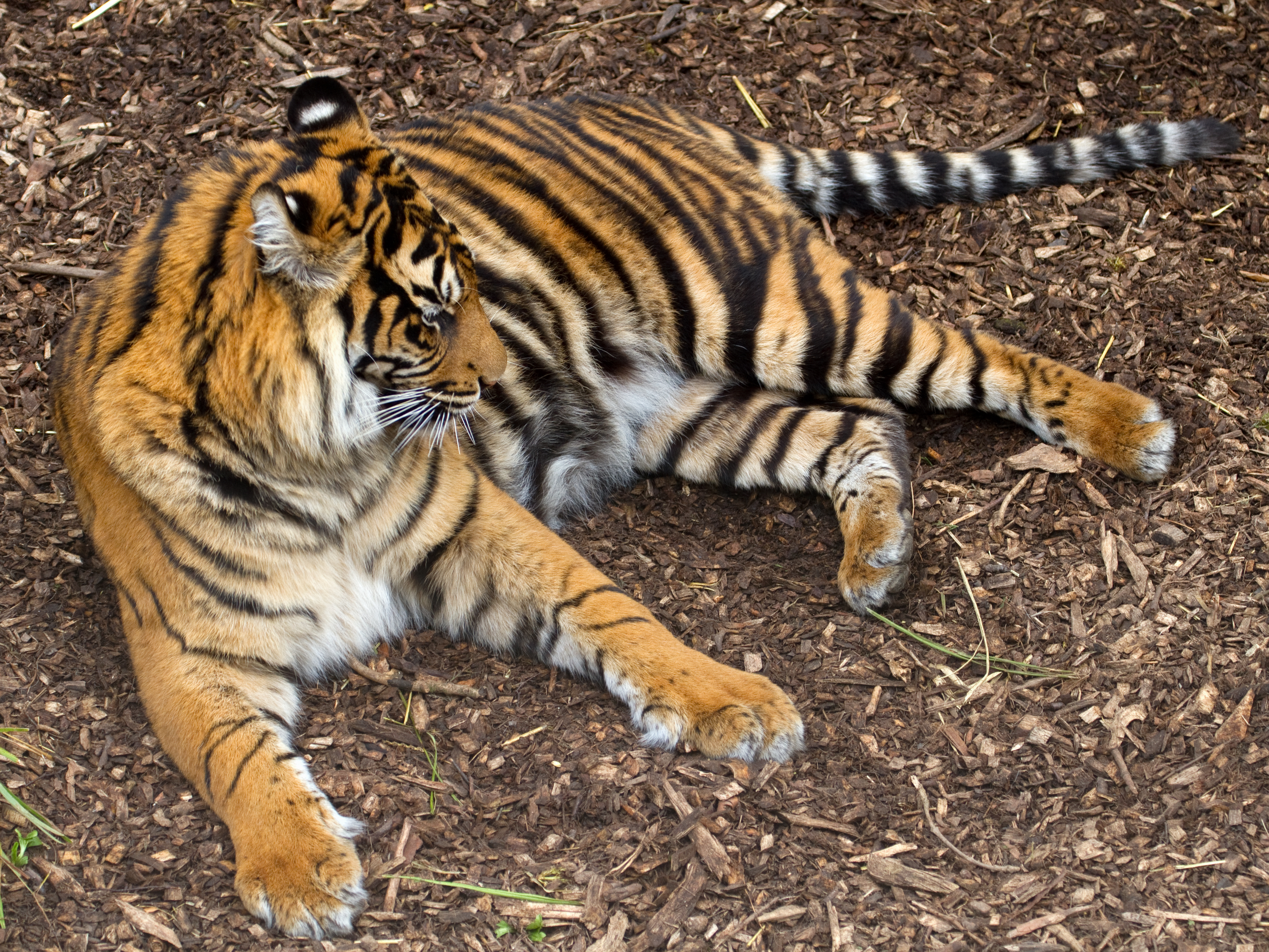
Sunda Island tiger (P. tigris sondaica), a tiger subspecies native to the Sunda islands

A subspecies is a taxonomic rank below species, used for populations that live in different areas and vary in size, shape, or other physical characteristics (morphology), but that can successfully interbreed. Not all species have subspecies, but for those that do there must be at least two. Subspecies is abbreviated as subsp. or ssp. and the singular and plural forms are the same ("the subspecies is" or "the subspecies are").

In zoology, under the International Code of Zoological Nomenclature, the subspecies is the only taxonomic rank below that of species that can receive a name. In botany and mycology, under the International Code of Nomenclature for algae, fungi, and plants, other infraspecific ranks, such as variety, may be named. In bacteriology and virology, under standard bacterial nomenclature and virus nomenclature, there are recommendations but not strict requirements for recognizing other important infraspecific ranks.

A taxonomist decides whether to recognize a subspecies. A common criterion for recognizing two distinct populations as subspecies rather than full species is their ability to interbreed even if some male offspring may be sterile. In the wild, subspecies do not interbreed due to geographic isolation or sexual selection. The differences between subspecies are usually less distinct than the differences between species.

== Nomenclature ==
The scientific name of a species is a binomial or binomen, and comprises two Latin words, the first denoting the genus and the second denoting the species. The scientific name of a subspecies is formed slightly differently in the different nomenclature codes. In zoology, under the International Code of Zoological Nomenclature (ICZN), the scientific name of a subspecies is termed a trinomen, and comprises three words, namely the binomen followed by the name of the subspecies. For example, the binomen for the leopard is Panthera pardus. The trinomen Panthera pardus fusca denotes a subspecies, the Indian leopard. All components of the trinomen are written in italics.

In botany, subspecies is one of many ranks below that of species, such as variety, subvariety, form, and subform. To identify the rank, the subspecific name must be preceded by "subspecies" (which is abbreviated to "subsp.", or the unpreferred "ssp."), as in Schoenoplectus californicus subsp. tatora.

In bacteriology, the only rank below species that is regulated explicitly by the code of nomenclature is subspecies, but infrasubspecific taxa are extremely important in bacteriology; Appendix 10 of the code lays out some recommendations that are intended to encourage uniformity in describing such taxa. Names published before 1992 in the rank of variety are taken to be names of subspecies (see International Code of Nomenclature of Prokaryotes). As in botany, subspecies is conventionally abbreviated as "subsp.", and is used in the scientific name: Bacillus subtilis subsp. spizizenii.

=== Nominotypical subspecies and subspecies autonyms ===
In zoological nomenclature, when a species is split into subspecies, the originally described population is retained as the "nominotypical subspecies", "nominate subspecies" or "definitive subspecies", which repeats the same name as the species. For example, Motacilla alba alba (often abbreviated M. a. alba) is the nominotypical subspecies of the white wagtail (Motacilla alba).

The subspecies name that repeats the species name is referred to in botanical nomenclature as the subspecies "autonym", and the subspecific taxon as the "autonymous subspecies".

=== Doubtful cases ===
When zoologists disagree over whether a certain population is a subspecies or a full species, the species name may be written in parentheses. Thus Larus (argentatus) smithsonianus means the American herring gull; the notation within the parentheses means that some consider it a subspecies of a larger herring gull species and therefore call it Larus argentatus smithsonianus, while others consider it a full species and therefore call it Larus smithsonianus (and the user of the notation is not taking a position).

== Criteria ==
A subspecies is a taxonomic rank below species – the only such rank recognized in the zoological code, and one of three main ranks below species in the botanical code. When geographically separate populations of a species exhibit recognizable phenotypic differences, biologists may identify these as separate subspecies; a subspecies is a recognized local variant of a species. Botanists and mycologists have the choice of ranks lower than subspecies, such as variety (Latin: varietas) or form (Latin: forma), to recognize smaller differences between populations.

== Monotypic and polytypic species ==
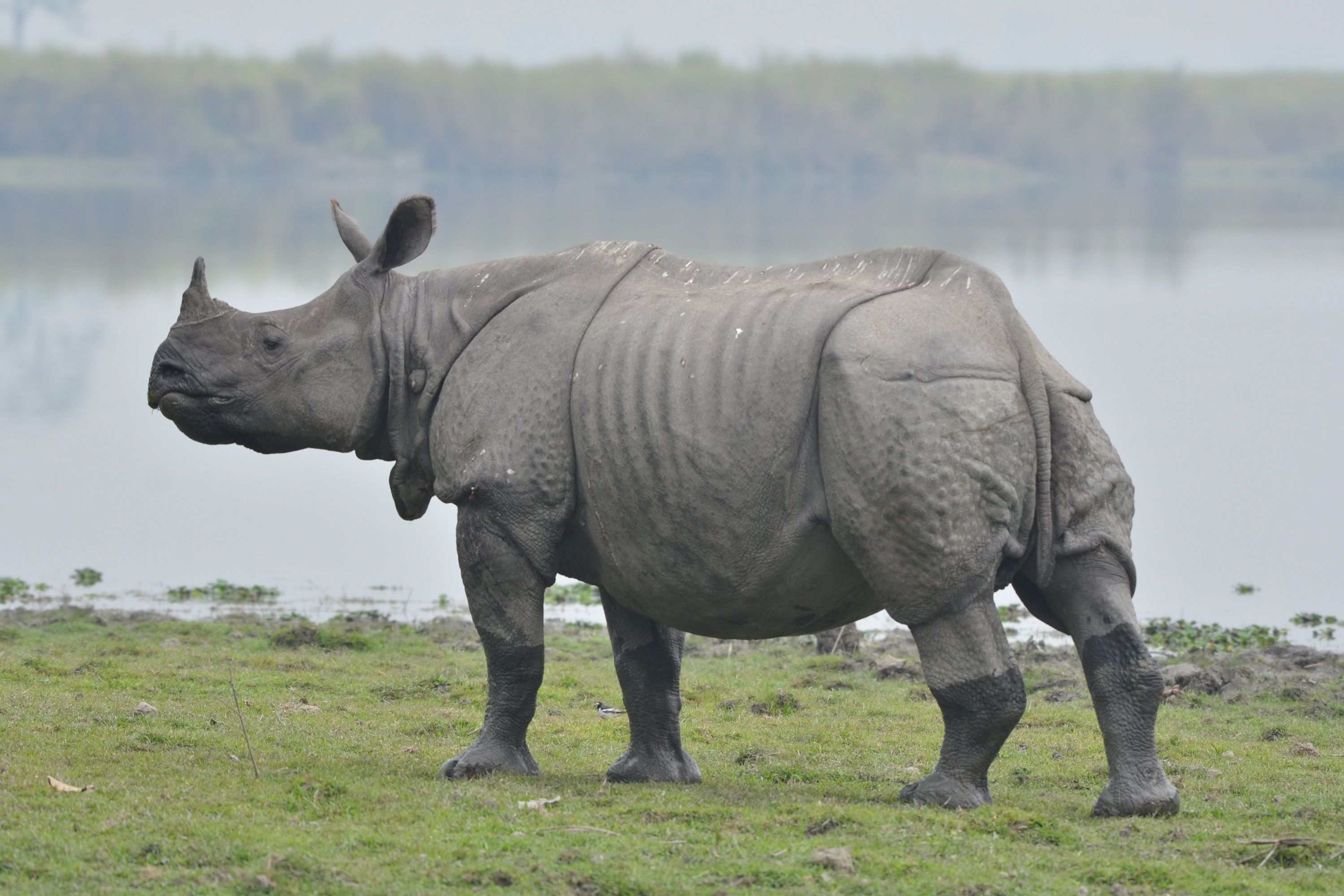
The Indian rhinoceros (Rhinoceros unicornis) is a monotypic species.

In biological terms, rather than in relation to nomenclature, a polytypic species has two or more genetically and phenotypically divergent subspecies, races, or more generally speaking, populations that differ from each other so that a separate description is warranted. These distinct groups do not interbreed as they are isolated from another, but they can interbreed and have fertile offspring, e.g. in captivity. These subspecies, races, or populations, are usually described and named by zoologists, botanists and microbiologists.

In a monotypic species, all populations exhibit the same genetic and phenotypical characteristics. Monotypic species can occur in several ways:

- All members of the species are very similar and cannot be sensibly divided into biologically significant subcategories.
- The individuals vary considerably, but the variation is essentially random and largely meaningless so far as genetic transmission of these variations is concerned.
- The variation among individuals is noticeable and follows a pattern, but there are no clear dividing lines among separate groups: they fade imperceptibly into one another. Such clinal variation always indicates substantial gene flow among the apparently separate groups that make up the population(s). Populations that have a steady, substantial gene flow among them are likely to represent a monotypic species, even when a fair degree of genetic variation is obvious.

== See also ==
- Breed
- Cultivar in botany
- Ecotype
- Form (botany)
- Form (zoology)
- Glossary of scientific naming
- Landrace
- Phenotype
- Polymorphism (biology)
- Race (taxonomy)
- Species complex
- Strain (biology)
- Variety (botany)
