= Variety (botany) =

Taxonomic rank below subspecies

The hierarchy of biological classification's eight major taxonomic ranks. Intermediate minor rankings are not shown.

In botanical nomenclature, variety (abbreviated var.; in Latin: varietas) is a taxonomic rank below that of species and subspecies, but above that of form. As such, it gets a three-part infraspecific name. It is sometimes recommended that the subspecies rank should be used to recognize geographic distinctiveness, whereas the variety rank is appropriate if the taxon is seen throughout the geographic range of the species.

== Example ==
The pincushion cactus, Escobaria vivipara, is a wide-ranging variable species occurring from Canada to Mexico, and found throughout New Mexico below about 2,600 metres (8,500 ft). Nine varieties have been described. Where the varieties of the pincushion cactus meet, they intergrade. The variety Escobaria vivipara var. arizonica is from Arizona, while Escobaria vivipara var. neo-mexicana is from New Mexico.

== Definitions ==
The term is defined in different ways by different authors. However, the International Code of Nomenclature for Cultivated Plants, while recognizing that the word "variety" is often used to denote "cultivar", does not accept this usage. Variety is defined in the code for cultivated plants as follows: "Variety (varietas) the category in the botanical nomenclatural hierarchy between species and form (forma)". The code for cultivated plants acknowledges the other usage as follows: "term used in some national and international legislation for a clearly distinguishable taxon below the rank of species; generally, in legislative texts, a term equivalent to cultivar. See also: cultivar and variety (varietas)".

A variety will have an appearance distinct from other varieties, but will hybridize freely with those other varieties.

== Other nomenclature uses ==
- In plant breeding nomenclature, at least in countries that are signatory to the UPOV Convention, "variety" or "plant variety" is a legal term.
- In zoological nomenclature, the only allowed rank below that of species is that of subspecies. A name that was published before 1961 as that of a variety is taken to be the name of a subspecies. A name published after 1960 as that of a variety does not formally exist. In zoology, forms and morphs are used informally if needed, but are unregulated by the ICZN.
- The bacteriological nomenclature uses the term subspecies. Some names were published as "varieties" before 1992 but the terminology is now disallowed; names that were published as varieties are taken to be published as subspecies.
- In viticulture nomenclature, what is referred to as "grape varieties" are in reality cultivars according to usage in the International Code of Nomenclature for Cultivated Plants or "plant varieties" in the legal sense rather than botanical taxonomy varieties, since they are propagated by cuttings and have properties that are not stable under sexual reproduction. However, usage of the term variety is so entrenched in viticulture that a change to cultivar is unlikely.

== See also ==
- Cultivar
- Hybrid (biology)
- Plant variety (law)
- Protection of Plant Varieties and Farmers' Rights Act of 2001 (India)
- Race (taxonomy)
- Subvariety
- Trinomial nomenclature
- Plant Landrace

== Bibliography ==
- Brickell, C.D.; Alexander, C.; Cubey, J.J.; David, J.C.; Hoffman, M.H.A.; Leslie, A.C.; Valéry Malécot; Jin, X. (2016), International Code of Nomenclature for Cultivated Plants (ICNCP or Cultivated Plant Code) incorporating the Rules and Recommendations for naming plants in cultivation, Ninth Edition, Adopted by the International Union of Biological Sciences International Commission for the Nomenclature of Cultivated Plants (PDF), International Society for Horticultural Science, ISBN 978-94-6261-116-0, archived (PDF) from the original on 2016-10-07
- Salm, Sarah; Allen, Deborah; Nester, Eugene; Anderson, Denise (2015). Nester's Microbiology: A Human Perspective (8th ed.). McGraw-Hill Higher Education. ISBN 9780077730932. Archived from the original on 2024-09-23.
