= Subvariety (botany) =

Taxonomic rank

A subvariety (Latin: subvarietas) in botanical nomenclature is a taxonomic rank. They are rarely used to classify organisms.

== Plant taxonomy ==
Subvariety is ranked:

- below that of variety (varietas)
- above that of form (forma).

Subvariety is an infraspecific taxon.

=== Name ===
Its name consists of three parts:

1. a genus name (genera)
2. a specific epithet (species)
3. an infraspecific epithet (subvariety)

To indicate the subvariety rank, the abbreviation "subvar." is put before the infraspecific epithet.
