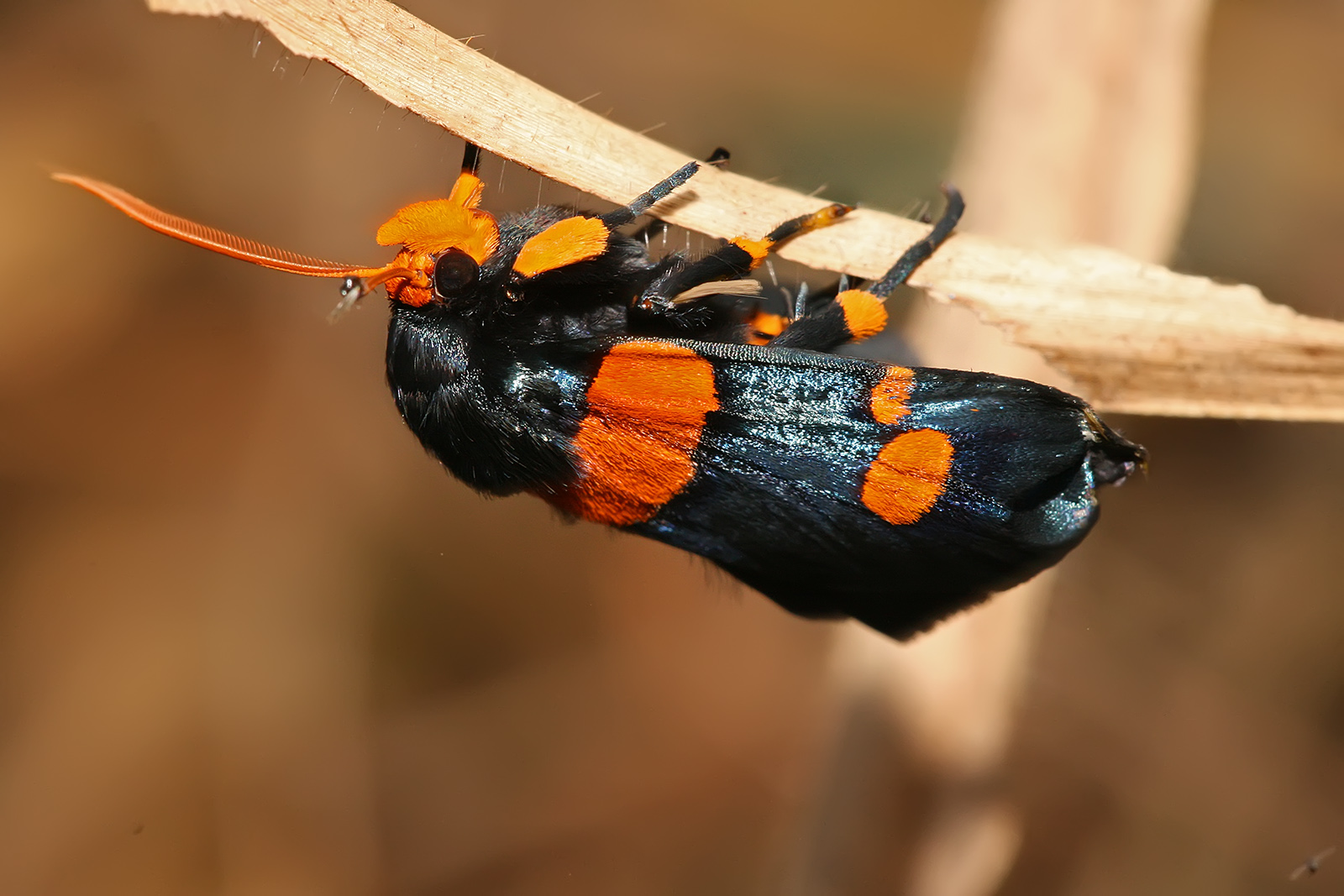
- Egybolis vaillantina

Scientific classification
- Kingdom: Animalia
- Phylum: Arthropoda
- Clade: Pancrustacea
- Class: Insecta
- Order: Lepidoptera
- Superfamily: Noctuoidea
- Family: Noctuidae (?)
- Subfamily: Catocalinae

Tribes
- Armadini; Catocalini; Erebini; Tytini

= Catocalinae =

Subfamily of moths

The Catocalinae are a subfamily of noctuoid moths, placed in family Noctuidae. In the alternative arrangement, where the Noctuidae are reduced to the core group around the Noctuinae, the present lineage is abolished, the upranked Catocalini being merged with the Erebini and becoming a subfamily of the reestablished family Erebidae.

Many of the species are large (7 to 10 cm, 2.8 to 3.9 in) compared to other noctuids in temperate zones, and have brightly colored backwings.

The closely related Ophiderinae and Calpinae are sometimes merged into this group.

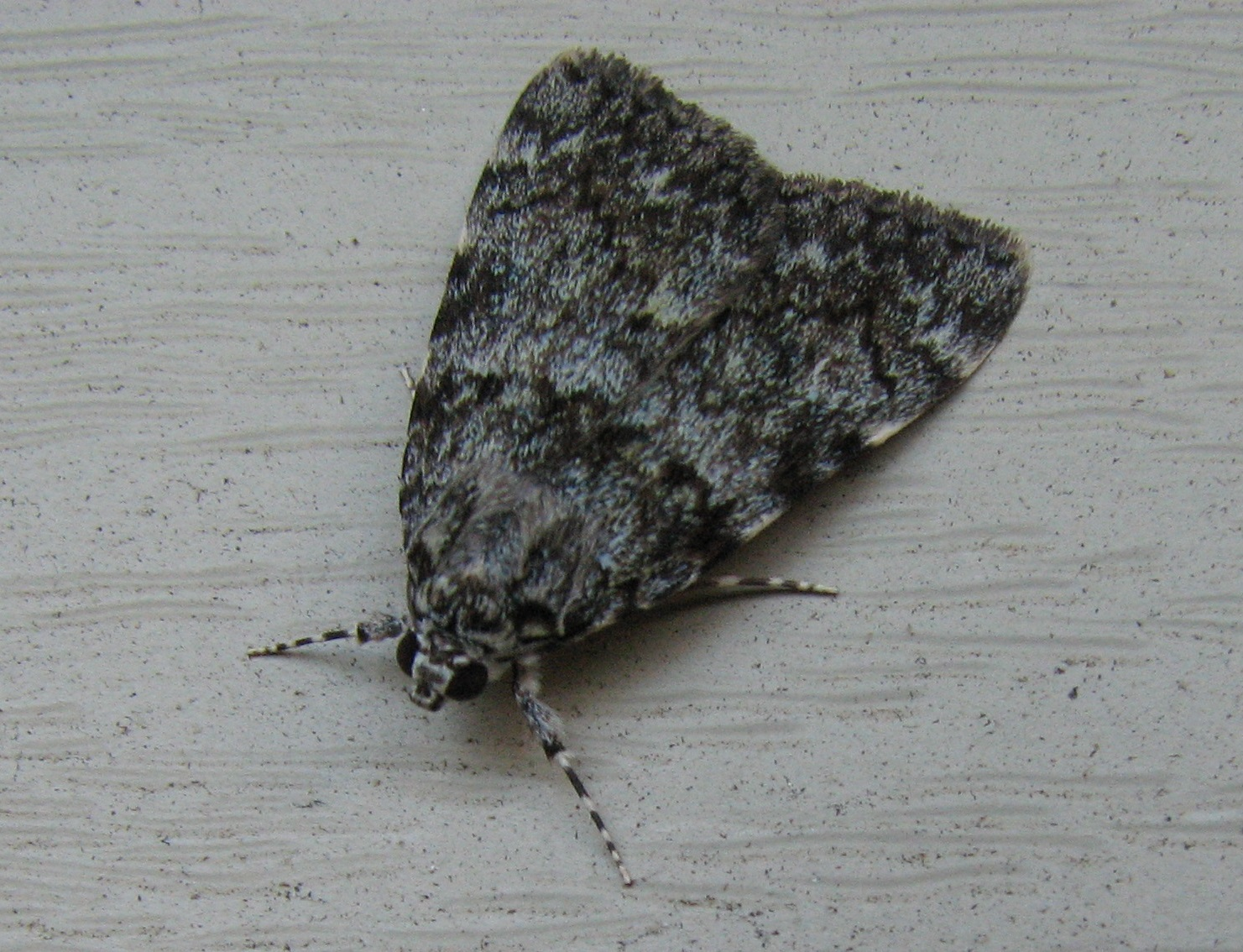
Catocala lineella

== Genera ==
The Catocalinae genera are usually assigned to the tribes Tytini, Armadini and Erebini, which have a fairly small number of genera, and the much larger Catocalini. The Poaphilini are another proposed tribe around the genus Argyrostrotis (= Poaphila), but is here considered to be paraphyletic. In addition, a high proportion of genera is not at present assigned to a specific tribe as their relationships require further study. These genera incertae sedis are:

- Acanthodelta
- Acanthodica
- Alapadna
- Allotria
- Alophosoma
- Amphiongia
- Anereuthina
- Anisoneura
- Anydrophila
- Argyrostrotis
- Arsacia
- Artena
- Arthisma
- Athyrma
- Attatha
- Attonda
- Axiocteta
- Bamra
- Batracharta
- Blasticorhinus
- Bocula
- Calesia
- Calliodes
- Celiptera
- Chalciope
- Chrysopera
- Coenipeta (Catocalini: Ophiusina?)
- Crioa
- Ctenusa
- Cutina
- Cyligramma
- Dasypodia
- Delgamma
- Dermaleipa (sometimes in Thyas)
- Dinumma
- Donuca
- Dordura
- Doryodes
- Ecphysis
- Egybolis
- Entomogramma
- Ercheia
- Erygia
- Eubolina (Catocalini: Ophiusina?)
- Euclystis (Catocalini: Ophiusina?)
- Euparthenos (Catocalini: Ophiusina?)
- Felinia
- Focillidia
- Gesonia
- Hamodes
- Hexamitoptera
- Homodes
- Hypopyra
- Iontha
- Ischyja
- Lacera
- Loxioda
- Lygniodes
- Matigramma (Catocalini: Ophiusina?)
- Metria (Catocalini: Ophiusina?)
- Mocis
- Niguza
- Ocalaria
- Ommatophora
- Pantydia
- Parallelia (Catocalini: Ophiusina?)
- Phoberia
- Phyllodes
- Platyja
- Plecoptera
- Pseudanthracia (Catocalini: Ophiusina?)
- Pseudoarcte
- Pseudosphetta
- Pterocyclophora
- Ptichodis
- Remigiodes
- Sciatta
- Scolecocampa
- Serrodes
- Speiredonia
- Spiloloma
- Spirama
- Sympis
- Tephriopis
- Thyas (Catocalini: Ophiusina?)
- Trigonodes
- Varicosia
- Zale (Catocalini: Ophiusina?)

In addition, some little-known noctuoid moth species which differ somewhat from the bulk of their supposed genera might belong here:

- Crypsiprora oxymetopa Turner, 1941
- Hypoprora tortuosa Turner, 1929
- Prorocopis acroleuca Turner, 1929
- Raparna trigramma Turner, 1906
- Sophta aeluropis Meyrick, 1902

Placement of Xenogenes in the Catocalinae is in error; it is a geometer moth, family Geometridae.
