= Niguza anisogramma =

Scientific classification
- Domain: Eukaryota
- Kingdom: Animalia
- Phylum: Arthropoda
- Class: Insecta
- Order: Lepidoptera
- Superfamily: Noctuoidea
- Family: Erebidae
- Genus: Niguza
- Species: N. anisogramma

Binomial name
- Niguza anisogramma Lower, 1905

Species of moth

Niguza anisogramma is a moth in subfamily Catocalini of family Erebidae. The species was first described by Oswald Bertram Lower in 1905. It is found in Australia.
