= Alophosoma syngenes =

Scientific classification
- Kingdom: Animalia
- Phylum: Arthropoda
- Class: Insecta
- Order: Lepidoptera
- Superfamily: Noctuoidea
- Family: Noctuidae (?)
- Genus: Alophosoma
- Species: A. syngenes

Binomial name
- Alophosoma syngenes Turner, 1929

Species of moth

Alophosoma syngenes is a moth of the family Noctuidae first described by Alfred Jefferis Turner in 1929. It is found in Australia.
