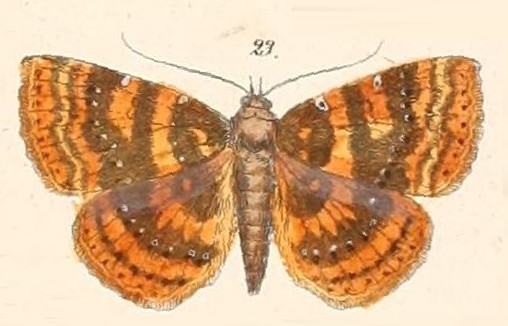

Scientific classification
- Kingdom: Animalia
- Phylum: Arthropoda
- Class: Insecta
- Order: Lepidoptera
- Superfamily: Noctuoidea
- Family: Erebidae
- Genus: Attonda
- Species: A. adspersa

Binomial name
- Attonda adspersa (R. Felder & Rogenhofer, 1874)

Synonyms
- Felinia adspersa; Capnodes alboguttata (Heyden, 1891); Capnodes pallens (Moore, 1882); Capnodes stellata (Moore, 1883); Capnodes trifasciata [Moore, 1877]

= Attonda adspersa =

Species of moth

Attonda adspersa is a moth of the family Erebidae first described by Rudolf Felder and Alois Friedrich Rogenhofer in 1874. It is known from the Democratic Republic of the Congo, Kenya, Madagascar, India, Sulawesi, Singapore, Borneo, Sumatra, Java, Bali, New Guinea and the Solomons.

The wingspan of this species is around 29 mm to 32 mm.

== Habitats ==
This species occurs mainly in lowland forests, and rarely in lower mountain forests up to 1000 m.
