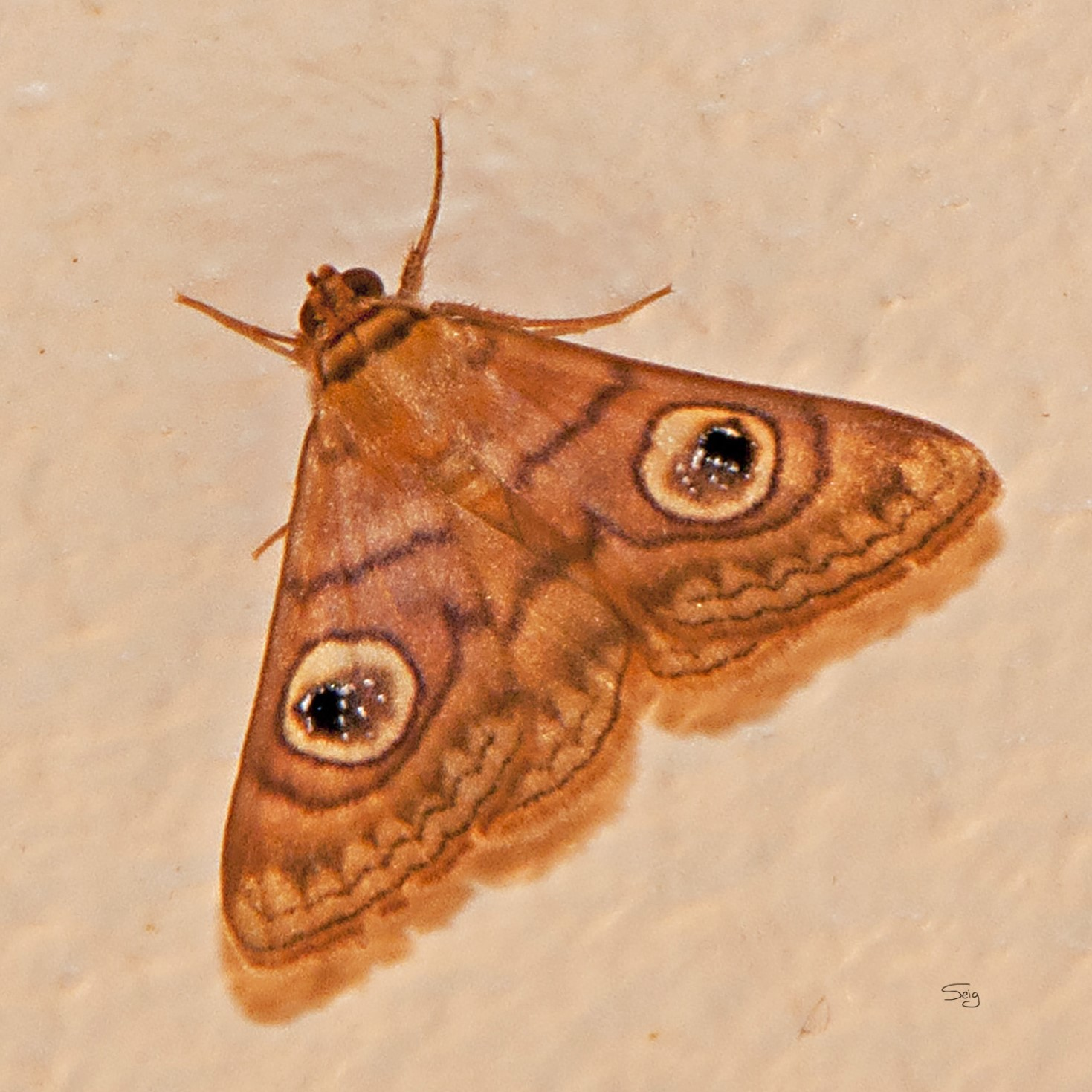

Scientific classification
- Kingdom: Animalia
- Phylum: Arthropoda
- Class: Insecta
- Order: Lepidoptera
- Superfamily: Noctuoidea
- Family: Erebidae
- Genus: Niguza
- Species: N. spiramioides

Binomial name
- Niguza spiramioides Walker, 1858

= Niguza spiramioides =

Species of moth

Niguza spiramioides is a species of moth in the family Erebidae. It was first described by Francis Walker in 1858 and is found in Australia in the Northern Territory, Queensland and Western Australia.
