= Chrysopera =

Scientific classification
- Kingdom: Animalia
- Phylum: Arthropoda
- Class: Insecta
- Order: Lepidoptera
- Superfamily: Noctuoidea
- Family: Noctuidae (?)
- Subfamily: Catocalinae
- Genus: Chrysopera; Hampson, 1894
- Species: C. combinans

Binomial name
- Chrysopera combinans (Walker, 1857)

Synonyms
- Achaea combinans Walker, 1857; Achaea quadrilunata Pagenstecher, 1890

Genus of moths

Chrysopera is a monotypic moth genus of the family Noctuidae erected by George Hampson in 1894. Its single species, Chrysopera combinans, was first described by Francis Walker in 1857. It is found from in the Indo-Australian tropics of India, Sri Lanka, Nepal, China east to New Guinea, Queensland, the Solomon Islands and Fiji.

== Description ==
Palpi upturned and smoothly scaled, where the second joint reaching vertex of head and third joint long and slightly curved. Antennae serrate and fasciculated in male. Thorax and abdomen smoothly scaled. Tibia spineless, and not clothed with long hair. Forewings with somewhat rounded apex.

A characteristic feature is yellowish apex to the hindwing and grey patch at the apex of the forewing costa.
