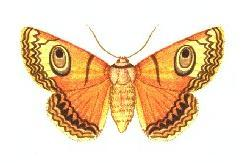
- Niguza eucesta

Scientific classification
- Kingdom: Animalia
- Phylum: Arthropoda
- Class: Insecta
- Order: Lepidoptera
- Superfamily: Noctuoidea
- Family: Erebidae
- Tribe: Catocalini
- Genus: Niguza; Walker, 1858

= Niguza =

Genus of moths

Niguza is a genus of moths of the family Erebidae. The genus was erected by Francis Walker in 1858.

== Species ==
- Niguza anisogramma Lower, 1905
- Niguza eucesta (Turner, 1903)
- Niguza habroscopa Lower, 1915
- Niguza oculita Swinhoe, 1901
- Niguza spiramioides Walker, 1858
