= Pseudoarcte =

Scientific classification
- Kingdom: Animalia
- Phylum: Arthropoda
- Class: Insecta
- Order: Lepidoptera
- Superfamily: Noctuoidea
- Family: Noctuidae (?)
- Subfamily: Catocalinae
- Genus: Pseudoarcte; Viette, 1949

Genus of moths

Pseudoarcte is a genus of moths of the family Noctuidae. The genus was described by Viette in 1949.

== Species ==
- Pseudoarcte albicollis Clench, 1955
- Pseudoarcte melanis Mabille, 1890
