= Matigramma inopinata =

Scientific classification
- Domain: Eukaryota
- Kingdom: Animalia
- Phylum: Arthropoda
- Class: Insecta
- Order: Lepidoptera
- Superfamily: Noctuoidea
- Family: Erebidae
- Tribe: Omopterini
- Genus: Matigramma
- Species: M. inopinata

Binomial name
- Matigramma inopinata Franclemont, 1986

Species of moth

Matigramma inopinata is a species of moth in the family Erebidae. It is found in North America.

The MONA or Hodges number for Matigramma inopinata is 8680.1.
