= Remigiodes =

Scientific classification
- Kingdom: Animalia
- Phylum: Arthropoda
- Class: Insecta
- Order: Lepidoptera
- Superfamily: Noctuoidea
- Family: Noctuidae (?)
- Subfamily: Catocalinae
- Genus: Remigiodes; Hampson, 1913

Genus of moths

Remigiodes is a genus of moths of the family Noctuidae. The genus was erected by George Hampson in 1913.

== Species ==
- Remigiodes pectinata (Hampson, 1909)
- Remigiodes remigina (Mabille, 1884)
- Remigiodes turlini Viette, 1973
