= Amphiongia =

Scientific classification
- Kingdom: Animalia
- Phylum: Arthropoda
- Class: Insecta
- Order: Lepidoptera
- Superfamily: Noctuoidea
- Family: Noctuidae (?)
- Subfamily: Catocalinae
- Genus: Amphiongia; Hampson, 1926

Genus of moths

Amphiongia is a genus of moths of the family Noctuidae. The genus was erected by George Hampson in 1926.

== Species ==
- Amphiongia achroa (Lower, 1903)
- Amphiongia chordophoides (Lucas, 1892)
- Amphiongia ochreomarginata (Joicey & Talbot, 1917)
