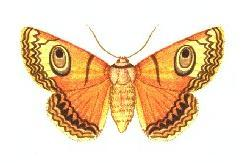

Scientific classification
- Kingdom: Animalia
- Phylum: Arthropoda
- Clade: Pancrustacea
- Class: Insecta
- Order: Lepidoptera
- Superfamily: Noctuoidea
- Family: Erebidae
- Genus: Niguza
- Species: N. eucesta

Binomial name
- Niguza eucesta (Turner, 1903)

Synonyms
- Acanthocoles eucesta Turner, 1903

= Niguza eucesta =

Species of moth

Niguza eucesta is a species of moth of the family Erebidae first described by Alfred Jefferis Turner in 1903. It is found in Australia in New South Wales, Queensland and the Northern Territory.

The wingspan is about 30 mm.
