= Niguza habroscopa =

Scientific classification
- Domain: Eukaryota
- Kingdom: Animalia
- Phylum: Arthropoda
- Class: Insecta
- Order: Lepidoptera
- Superfamily: Noctuoidea
- Family: Erebidae
- Genus: Niguza
- Species: N. habroscopa

Binomial name
- Niguza habroscopa Lower, 1915

Niguza habroscopa, a species of moth from Australia

Niguza habroscopa is a species of moth native to Australia.
