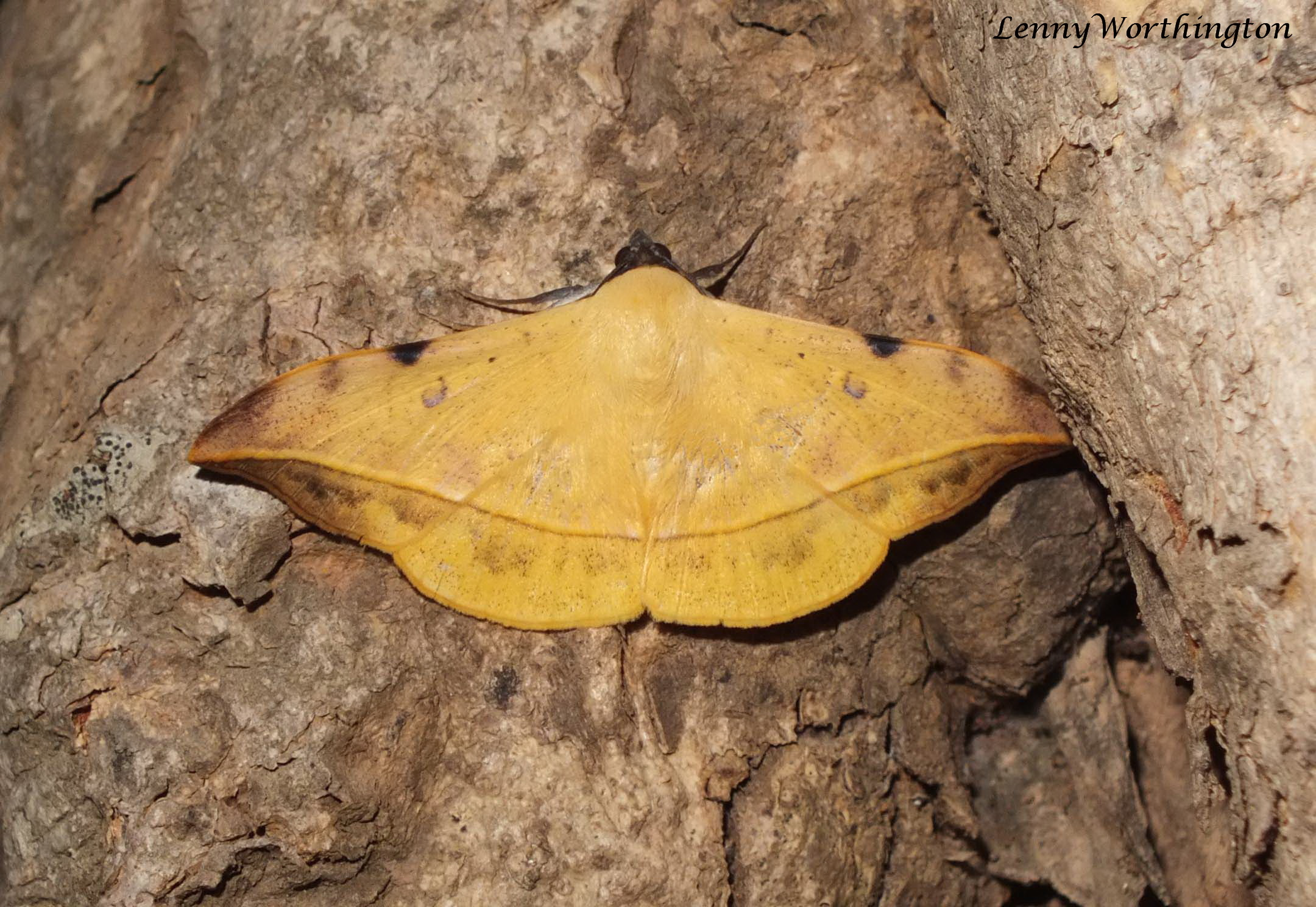

Scientific classification
- Kingdom: Animalia
- Phylum: Arthropoda
- Clade: Pancrustacea
- Class: Insecta
- Order: Lepidoptera
- Superfamily: Noctuoidea
- Family: Erebidae
- Genus: Hamodes
- Species: H. propitia

Binomial name
- Hamodes propitia (Guérin-Méneville, [1831])

Synonyms
- Ophiusa propitia Boisduval, 1832; Ophisma attacicola Walker, 1858; Hamodes aurantiaca Guenee, 1852; Hypenaria discistriga Moore, 1867; Hamodes marginata Moore, 1882

= Hamodes propitia =

Species of moth

Hamodes propitia is a moth in the family Erebidae first described by Félix Édouard Guérin-Méneville in 1831. It is found in the north-eastern Himalayas, Myanmar, Thailand, Borneo, Sumatra, Taiwan, from the Philippines east to Queensland, the Carolines (Palau) and the Solomon Islands.
