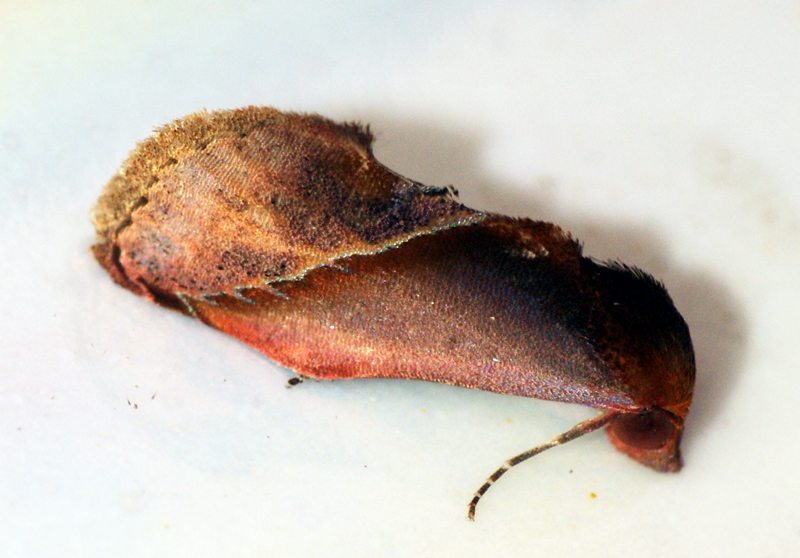

Scientific classification
- Kingdom: Animalia
- Phylum: Arthropoda
- Clade: Pancrustacea
- Class: Insecta
- Order: Lepidoptera
- Superfamily: Noctuoidea
- Family: Noctuidae (?)
- Subfamily: Catocalinae
- Genus: Arsacia; Walker, 1866
- Species: A. rectalis

Binomial name
- Arsacia rectalis Walker, 1863

Synonyms
- Generic; Amblyzancla Turner, 1936; Midea Walker, 1863; Notocyma Snellen, 1872; Specific; Midea rectalis Walker, 1863; Arsacia saturatalis Walker, [1866]; Notocyma pruinosa Snellen, 1872; Arsacia frontirufa Swinhoe, 1885; Amblyzancla declivis Turner, 1936

= Arsacia =

Genus of moths

Arsacia is a monotypic genus of moths in the family Noctuidae. Its only species is Arsacia rectalis. Both the genus and species were described by Francis Walker, the genus in 1866 and the species in 1863. It is found from the Indo-Australian tropics of India, Sri Lanka to Queensland and the Solomon Islands.

== Description ==
Palpi porrect (extending forward), where the second joint thickly scaled, and third joint minute and acute. Frontal tuft absent. Antennae almost simple in male. Thorax and abdomen smoothly scaled. Tibia naked. Forewings with quadrate apex. Outer margin rounded. Inner margin lobed and with slight tufts of hair near base and at outer angle. Veins 7, 8, 9 and 10 stalked.

The wingspan is 14–18 mm. Adults have been recorded on wing in March. Head and thorax rufous. Abdomen fuscous. Forewings bright chestnut. The costa suffused with pink. There is an oblique line runs from apex to middle of inner margin, the area beyond it suffused with pink and with indistinct sub-marginal and marginal series of patches of dark scales. Hindwings dark fuscous.

== Biology ==
The larvae feed on the young leaves of Dalbergia species.
