= Matigramma rubrosuffusa =

Scientific classification
- Kingdom: Animalia
- Phylum: Arthropoda
- Clade: Pancrustacea
- Class: Insecta
- Order: Lepidoptera
- Superfamily: Noctuoidea
- Family: Erebidae
- Genus: Matigramma
- Species: M. rubrosuffusa

Binomial name
- Matigramma rubrosuffusa Grote, 1882

Species of moth

Matigramma rubrosuffusa is a species of moth in the family Erebidae. It is found in North America.
