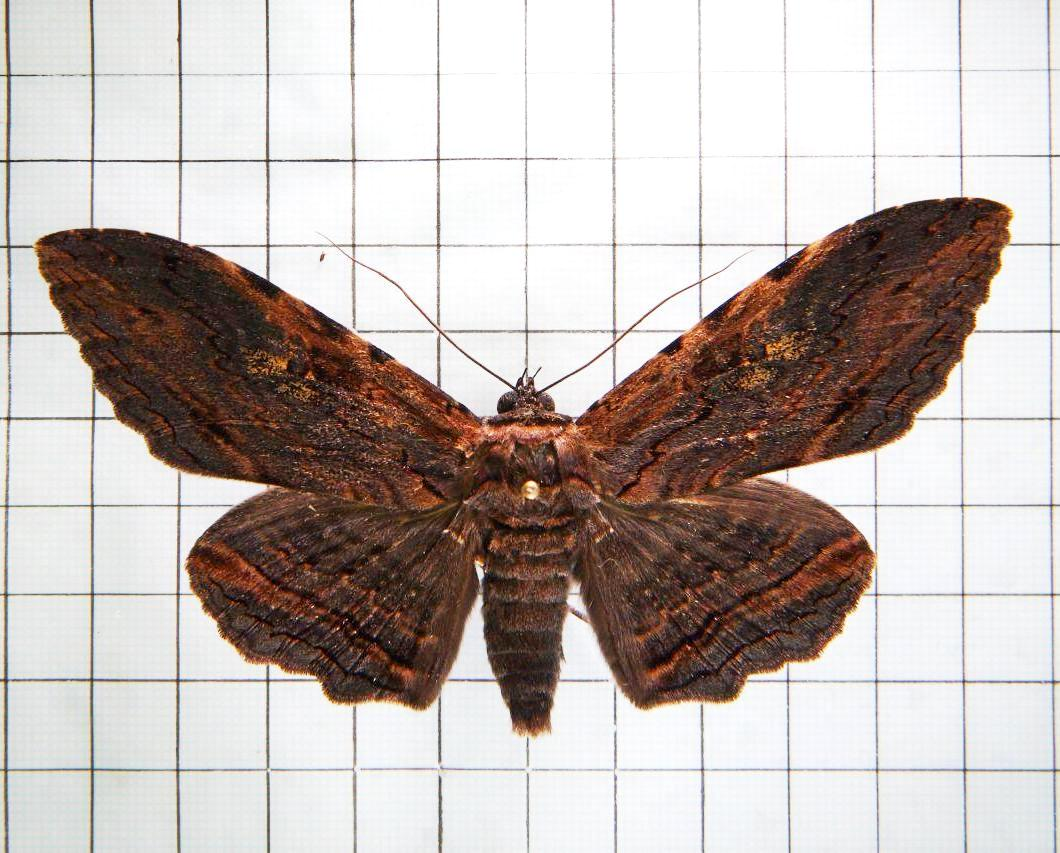

Scientific classification
- Kingdom: Animalia
- Phylum: Arthropoda
- Class: Insecta
- Order: Lepidoptera
- Superfamily: Noctuoidea
- Family: Noctuidae (?)
- Genus: Anisoneura
- Species: A. salebrosa

Binomial name
- Anisoneura salebrosa Guenée, 1852

Synonyms
- Anisoneura obscurata Pagenstecher, 1896

= Anisoneura salebrosa =

Species of moth

Anisoneura salebrosa is a moth of the family Noctuidae first described by Achille Guenée in 1852. It is found in Taiwan, Thailand, Vietnam, Sumatra, Peninsular Malaysia, Borneo, Sulawesi, the north-eastern part of the Himalayas (Nepal and India), Bangladesh, China, Japan and the Philippines.
