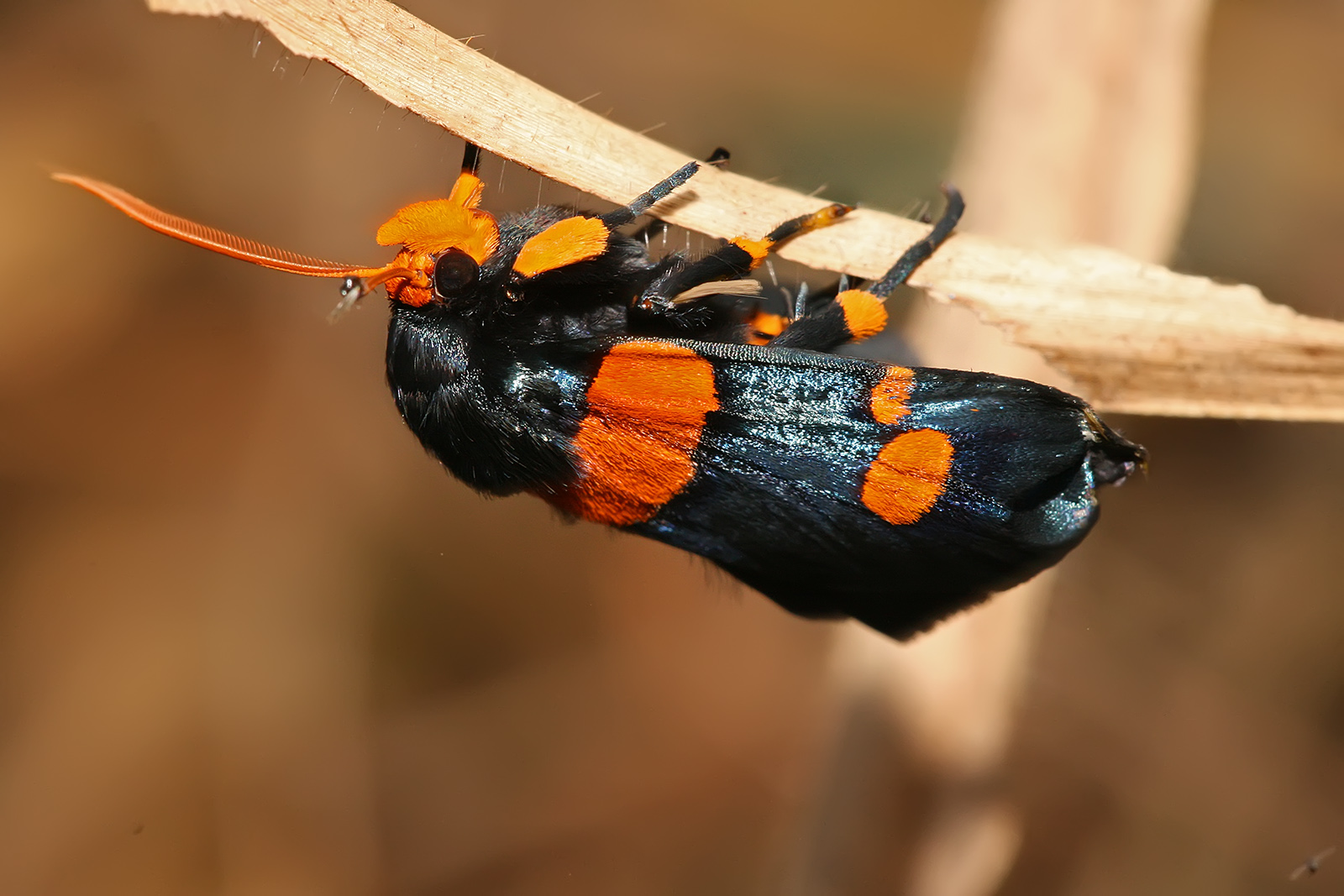
- Egybolis vaillantina

Scientific classification
- Kingdom: Animalia
- Phylum: Arthropoda
- Clade: Pancrustacea
- Class: Insecta
- Order: Lepidoptera
- Superfamily: Noctuoidea
- Family: Noctuidae (?)
- Subfamily: Catocalinae
- Genus: Egybolis; Boisduval, 1847
- Species: E. vaillantina

Binomial name
- Egybolis vaillantina Stoll, 1790

= Egybolis =

African peach moth

Genus of moths

Egybolis is a monotypic genus of moths of the family Erebidae erected by Jean Baptiste Boisduval in 1847. Its only species, Egybolis vaillantina, the African peach moth, was first described by Caspar Stoll in 1790. It is found in the Afrotropical realm.

The wingspan is about 60 mm. The moths are active during the day.

The larvae feed on peach and Sapindus species.

== Gallery ==
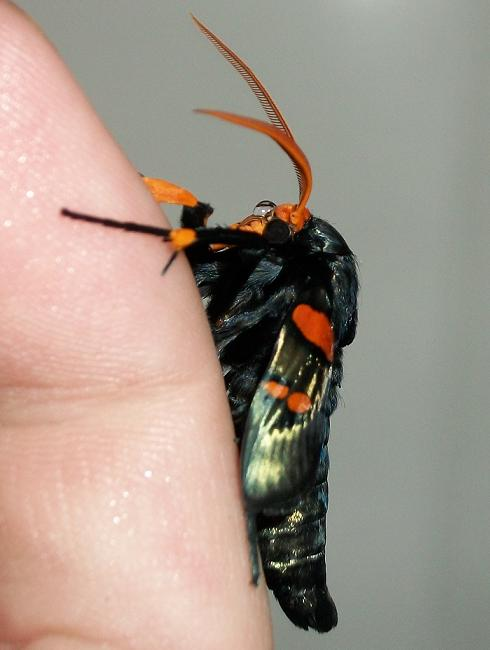
Newly hatched

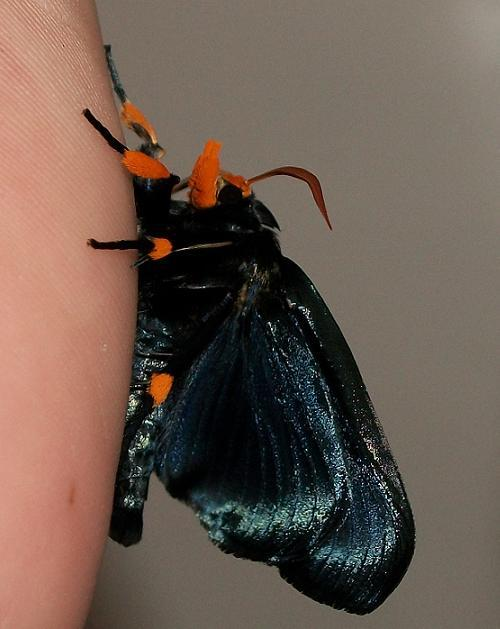
Extending wings

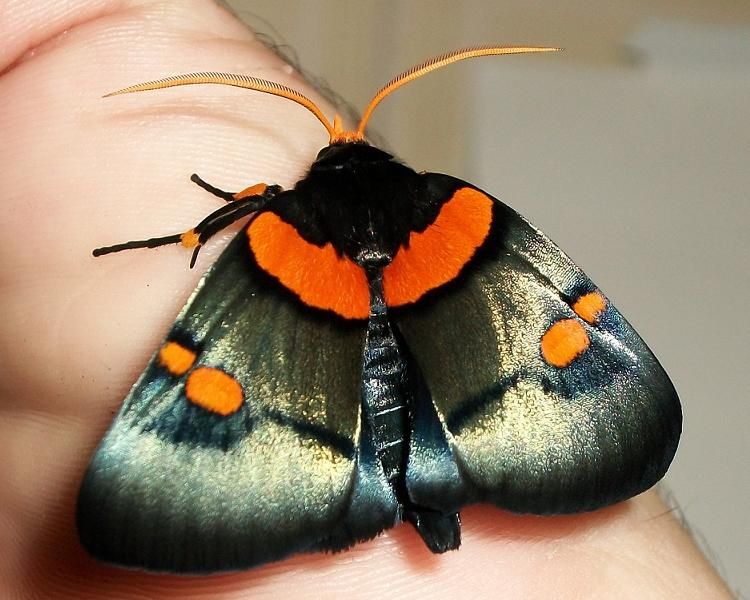
Drying wings

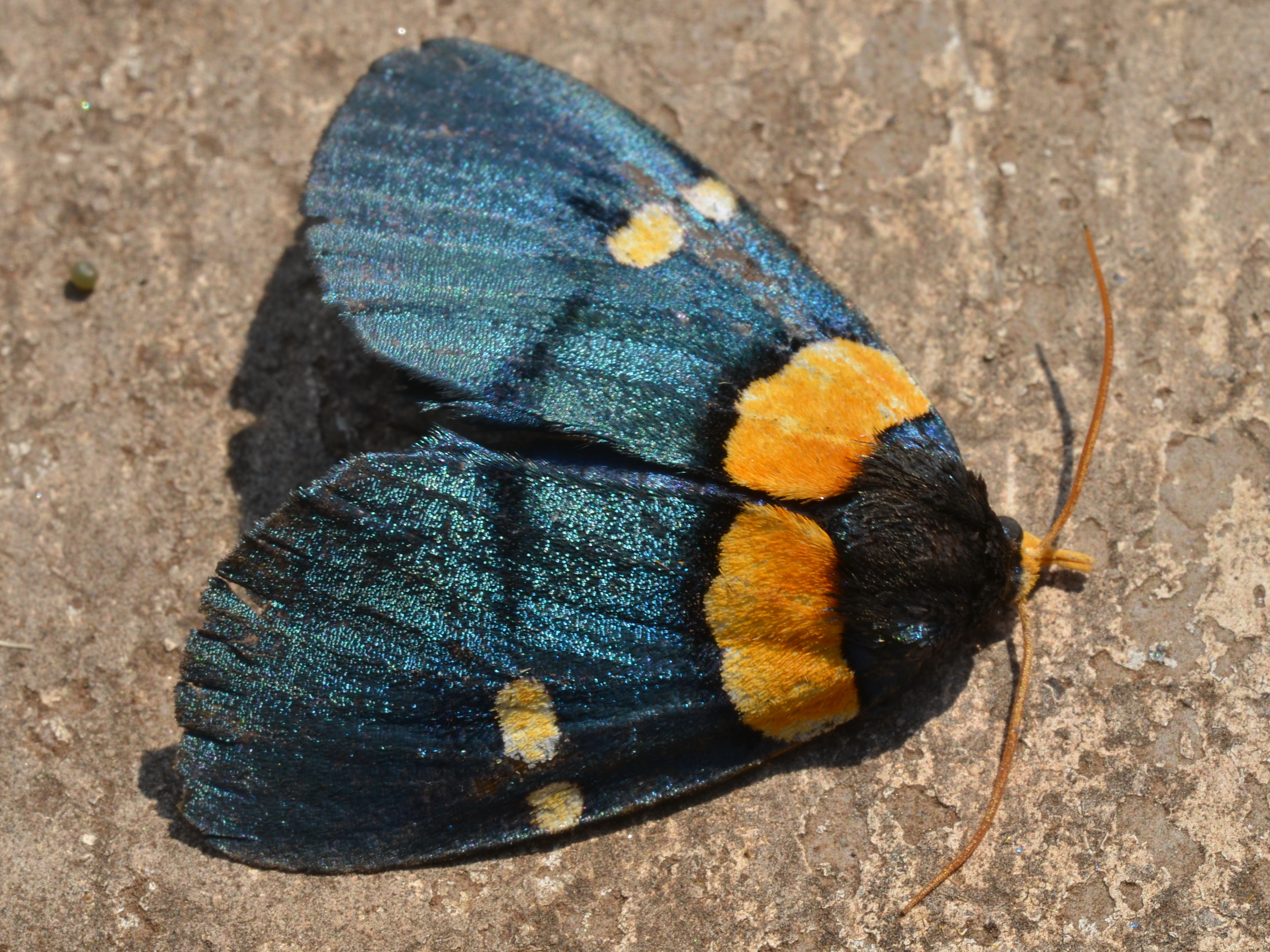

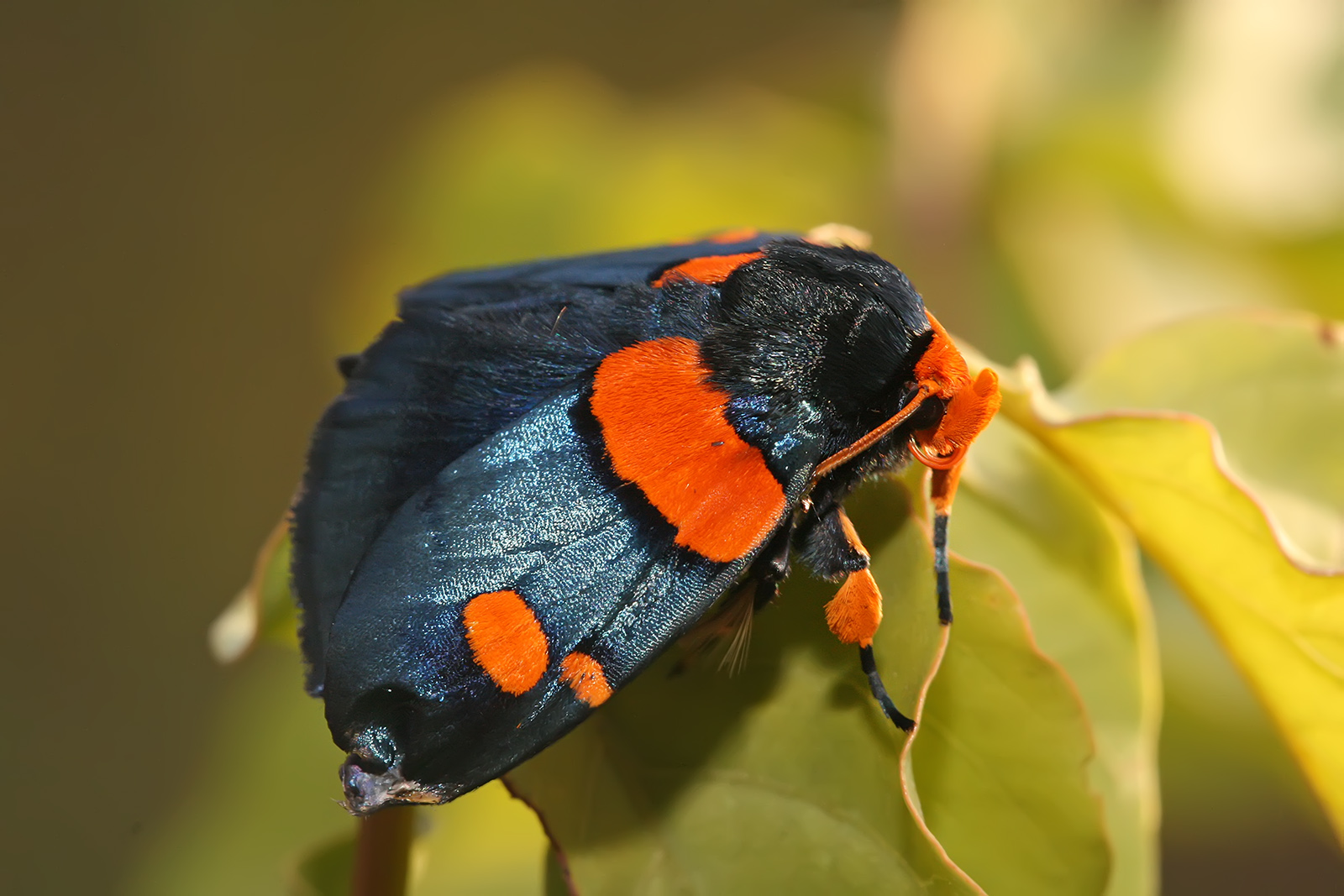
