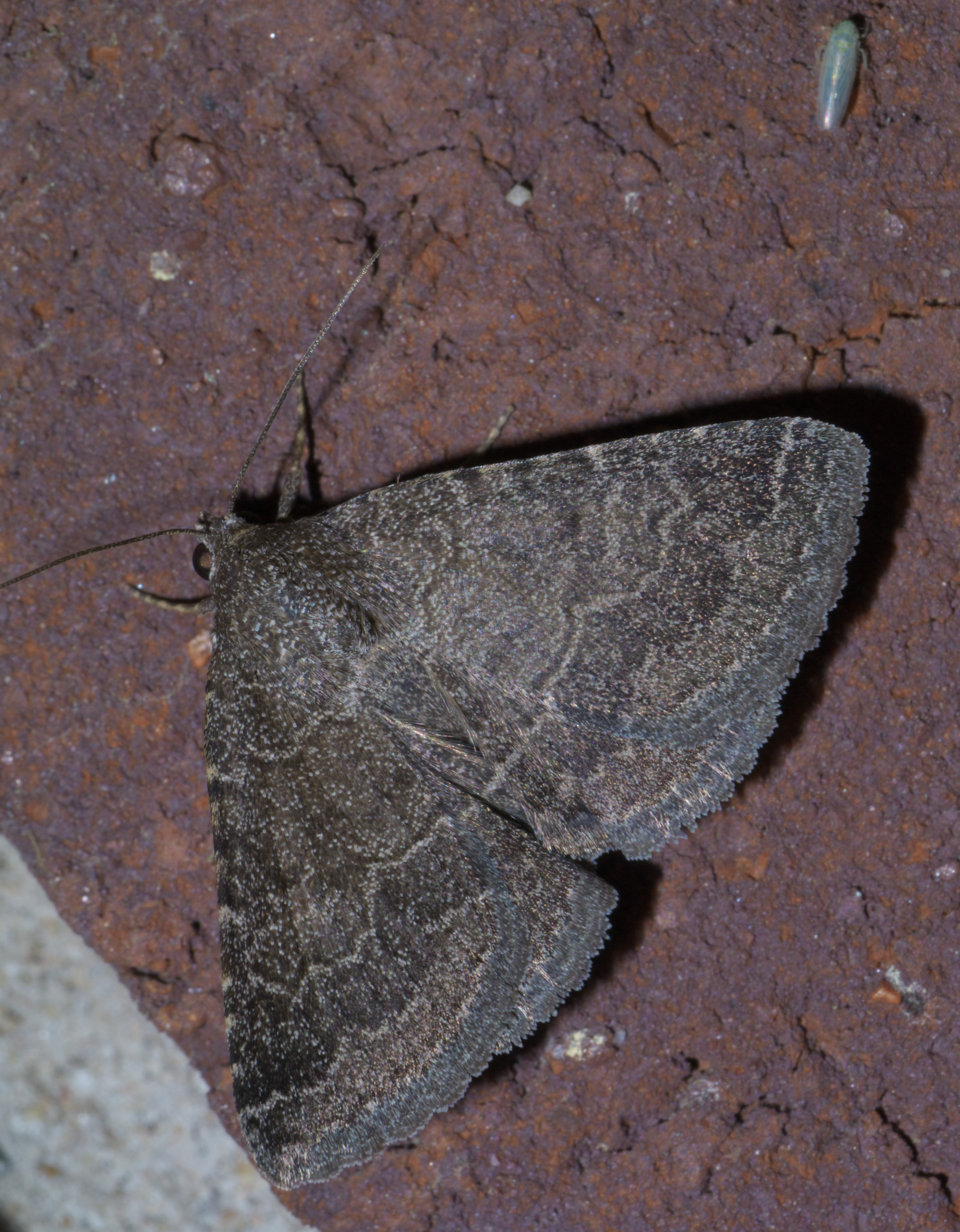

Scientific classification
- Kingdom: Animalia
- Phylum: Arthropoda
- Class: Insecta
- Order: Lepidoptera
- Superfamily: Noctuoidea
- Family: Erebidae
- Genus: Matigramma
- Species: M. pulverilinea

Binomial name
- Matigramma pulverilinea Grote, 1872

= Matigramma pulverilinea =

Species of moth

Matigramma pulverilinea, the dusty lined matigramma, is an owlet moth in the family Erebidae. The species was first described by Augustus Radcliffe Grote in 1872. It is found in North America.

The MONA or Hodges number for Matigramma pulverilinea is 8679.

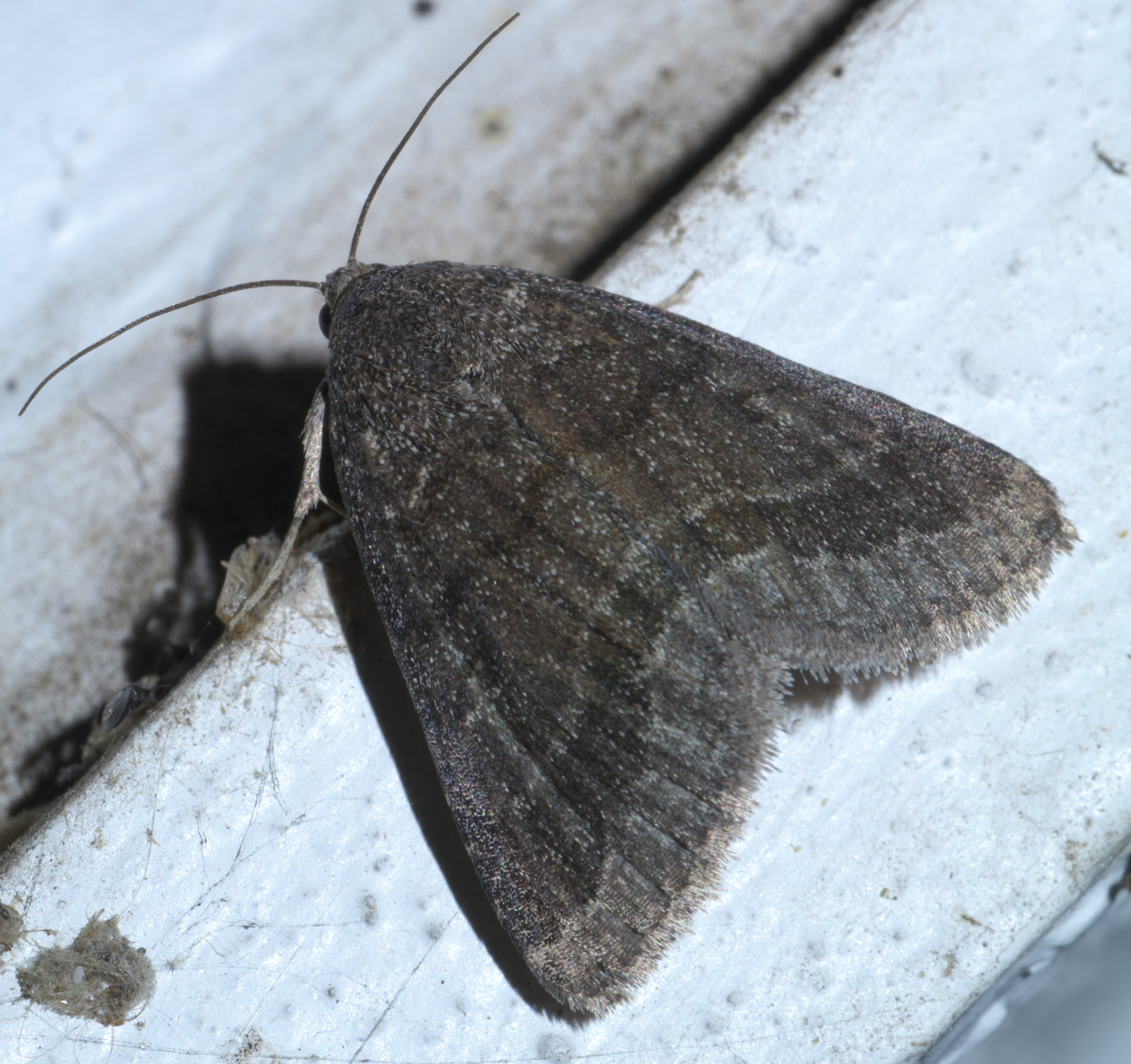
Dusty lined matigramma, Matigramma pulverilinea
