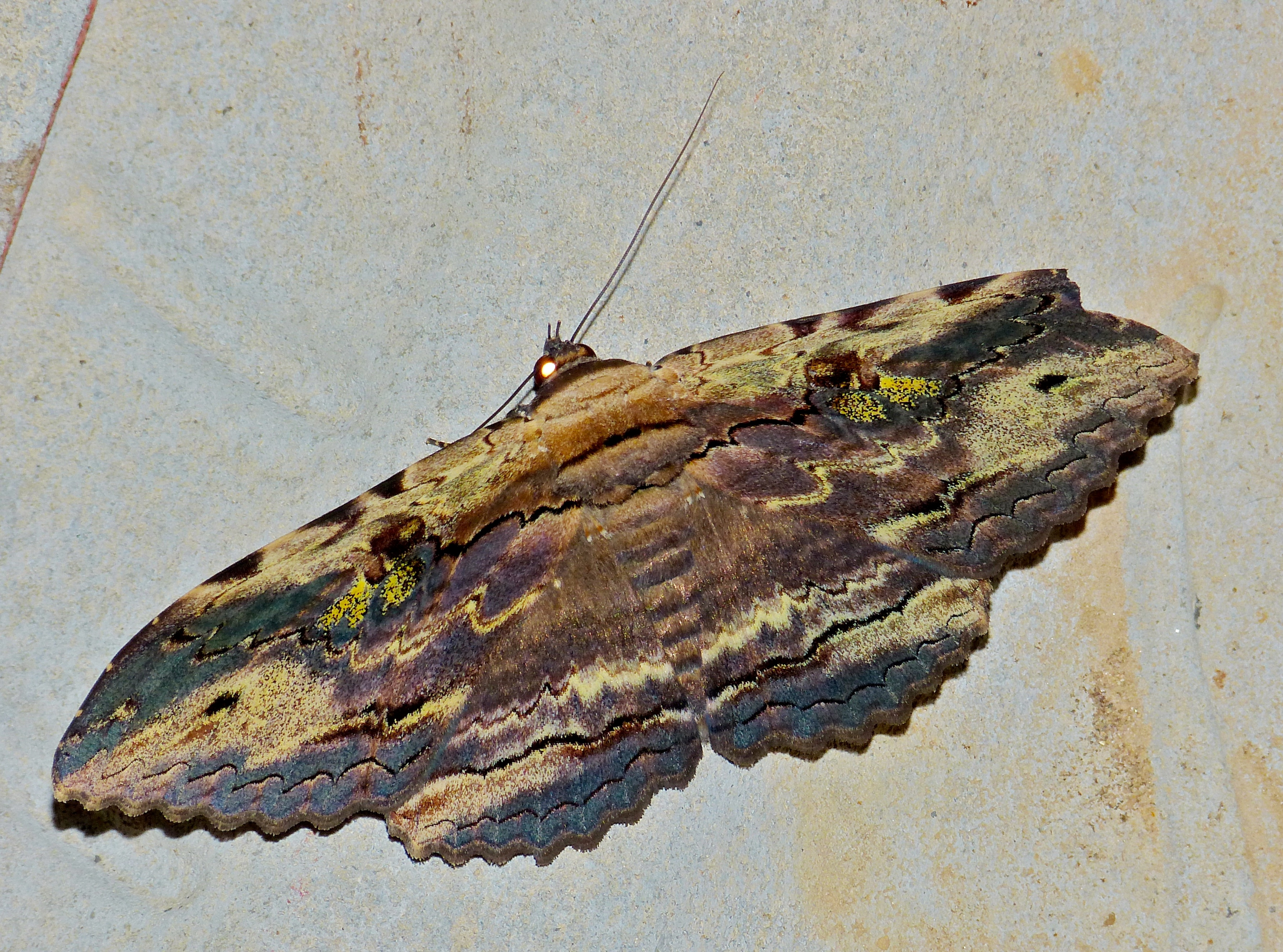
- A. aluco

Scientific classification
- Kingdom: Animalia
- Phylum: Arthropoda
- Class: Insecta
- Order: Lepidoptera
- Superfamily: Noctuoidea
- Family: Noctuidae (?)
- Subfamily: Catocalinae
- Genus: Anisoneura; Guenée, 1852

= Anisoneura =

Genus of moths

Anisoneura is a genus of moths of the family Erebidae.

== Species ==
The species include:

- Anisoneura aluco (Fabricius, 1775)
- Anisoneura hypocyana Guenée, 1852
- Anisoneura papuana Hampson, 1913
- Anisoneura sphingoides (C.Felder, 1861)
- Anisoneura salebrosa Guenée, 1852
- Anisoneura zeuzeroides Guenée, 1852
