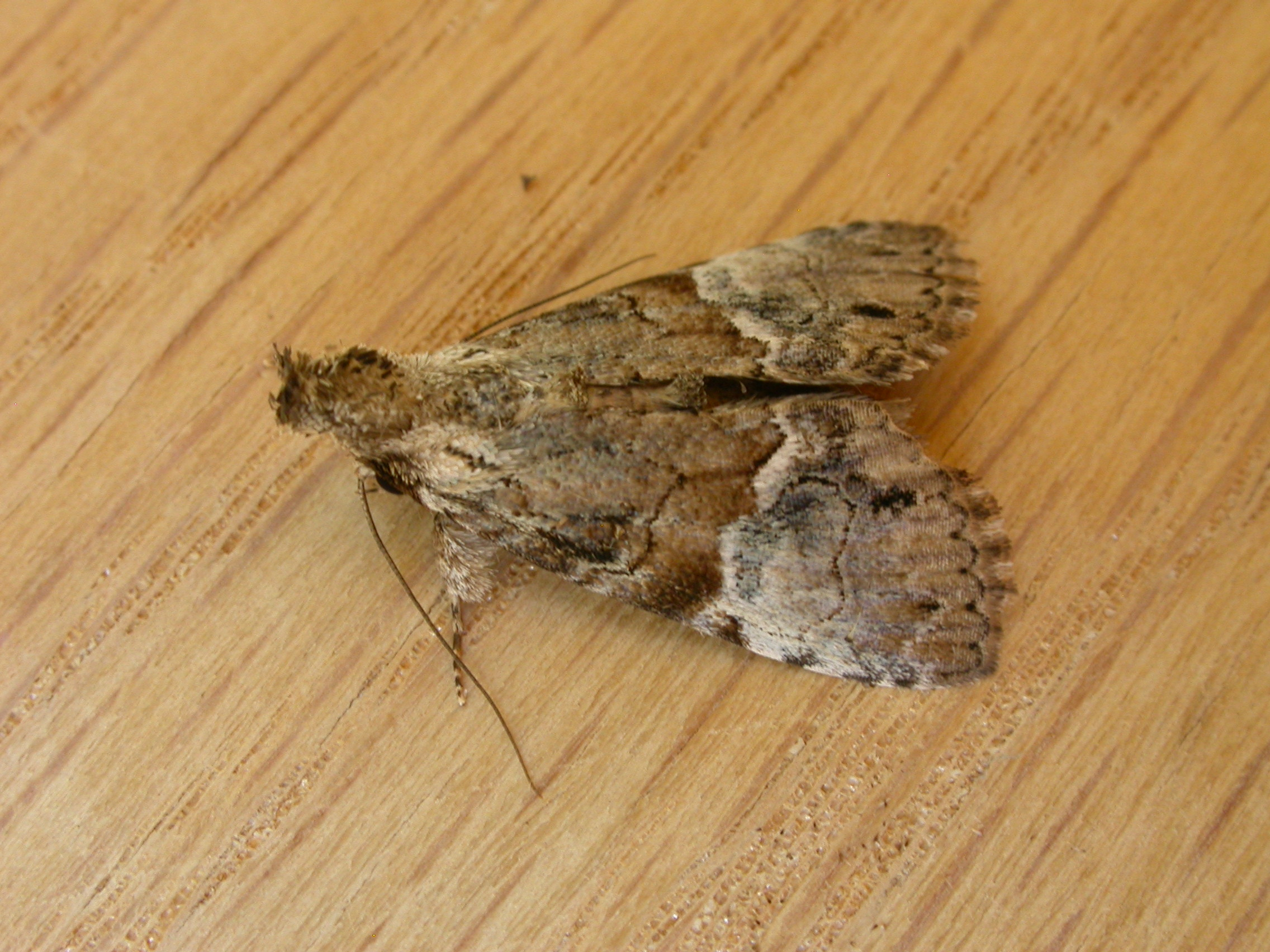

Scientific classification
- Kingdom: Animalia
- Phylum: Arthropoda
- Clade: Pancrustacea
- Class: Insecta
- Order: Lepidoptera
- Superfamily: Noctuoidea
- Family: Noctuidae (?)
- Genus: Alophosoma
- Species: A. emmelopis

Binomial name
- Alophosoma emmelopis Turner, 1929

= Alophosoma emmelopis =

Species of moth

Alophosoma emmelopis, the bicoloured crest, is a moth of the family Noctuidae. The species was first described by Alfred Jefferis Turner in 1929. It is found in Australia.
