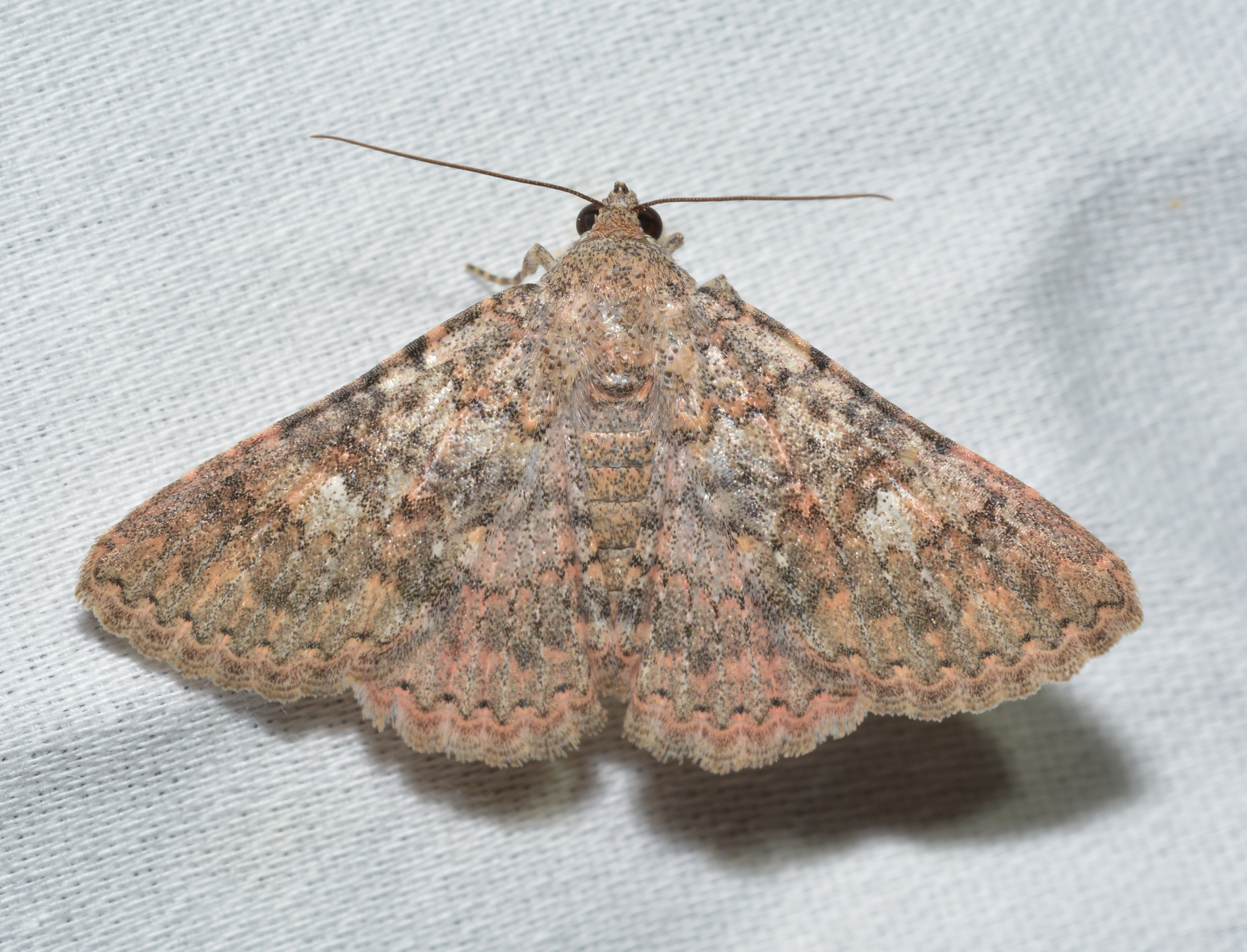

Scientific classification
- Domain: Eukaryota
- Kingdom: Animalia
- Phylum: Arthropoda
- Class: Insecta
- Order: Lepidoptera
- Superfamily: Noctuoidea
- Family: Erebidae
- Genus: Matigramma
- Species: M. emmilta

Binomial name
- Matigramma emmilta Franclemont, 1986

= Matigramma emmilta =

Species of moth

Matigramma emmilta is a species of moth in the family Erebidae. It was described by John G. Franclemont in 1986 and is found in North America, where it has been recorded from Arizona, New Mexico and Texas. The habitat consists of mountain canyons and deserts.

The forewing length is 16–19 mm. Adults are on wing from February to October.

The larvae feed on Chrysothamnus species.
