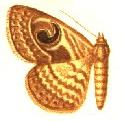

Scientific classification
- Kingdom: Animalia
- Phylum: Arthropoda
- Class: Insecta
- Order: Lepidoptera
- Superfamily: Noctuoidea
- Family: Noctuidae (?)
- Genus: Calliodes
- Species: C. appollina

Binomial name
- Calliodes appollina Guenée, 1852

= Calliodes appollina =

Species of moth

Calliodes appollina is a moth of the family Noctuidae first described by Achille Guenée in 1852. It is found in Africa, including Senegal and South Africa.
