= Anydrophila stuebeli =

Scientific classification
- Domain: Eukaryota
- Kingdom: Animalia
- Phylum: Mollusca
- Class: Gastropoda
- Order: Stylommatophora
- Family: Amphibulimidae
- Genus: Anydrophila
- Species: A. stuebeli

Binomial name
- Anydrophila stuebeli (Calberla, 1891)

Synonyms
- Drasteria stuebeli

Species of moth

Anydrophila stuebeli is a moth of the family Noctuidae first described by Heinrich Wilhelm Calberla in 1891. It is found in the Sinai, Egypt, central Arabia, the United Arab Emirates, Jordan and Israel.

There is one generation per year. Adults are on wing from March to May.

The larvae possibly feed on Calligonum comosum.
