= Alophosoma hypoxantha =

Scientific classification
- Kingdom: Animalia
- Phylum: Arthropoda
- Clade: Pancrustacea
- Class: Insecta
- Order: Lepidoptera
- Superfamily: Noctuoidea
- Family: Noctuidae (?)
- Genus: Alophosoma
- Species: A. hypoxantha

Binomial name
- Alophosoma hypoxantha Lower, 1902

Synonyms
- Prorocopis hypoxantha; Alphosoma pallidula; Crioa pallidula

Species of moth

Alophosoma hypoxantha is a moth of the family Noctuidae first described by Oswald Bertram Lower in 1902. It is found in Australia.

The wingspan is about 30 mm.
