= Matigramma obscurior =

Scientific classification
- Domain: Eukaryota
- Kingdom: Animalia
- Phylum: Arthropoda
- Class: Insecta
- Order: Lepidoptera
- Superfamily: Noctuoidea
- Family: Erebidae
- Tribe: Omopterini
- Genus: Matigramma
- Species: M. obscurior

Binomial name
- Matigramma obscurior Franclemont & Todd, 1983

Species of moth

Matigramma obscurior is a species of moth in the family Erebidae. It is found in North America.

The MONA or Hodges number for Matigramma obscurior is 8681.
