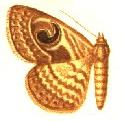
- Calliodes appollina

Scientific classification
- Kingdom: Animalia
- Phylum: Arthropoda
- Class: Insecta
- Order: Lepidoptera
- Superfamily: Noctuoidea
- Family: Noctuidae (?)
- Subfamily: Catocalinae
- Genus: Calliodes; Guenée, 1852

= Calliodes =

Genus of moths

Calliodes is a genus of moths of the family Noctuidae.

== Species ==
- Calliodes appollina Guenée, 1852
- Calliodes barnsi A.E. Prout, 1924
- Calliodes pretiosissima Holland, 1892 (syn: Calliodes rivulifera Butler, 1893)
