= Archaeopilocornus =

Scientific classification
- Kingdom: Animalia
- Phylum: Arthropoda
- Class: Insecta
- Order: Lepidoptera
- Superfamily: Noctuoidea
- Family: Erebidae
- Tribe: Catocalini
- Genus: Archaeopilocornus; Kühne, 2005
- Species: A. lucidus

Binomial name
- Archaeopilocornus lucidus (Pinhey, 1968)

Synonyms
- Ulotrichopus lucidus Pinhey, 1968; Archaeopilocornus; Archeopilocornus lucidus

Genus of moths

Archaeopilocornus is a genus of moths of the family Erebidae. It contains only one species, Archaeopilocornus lucidus, which is found in Botswana, Eswatini, Mozambique, South Africa, Tanzania and Zimbabwe.
