= Axiocteta =

Scientific classification
- Domain: Eukaryota
- Kingdom: Animalia
- Phylum: Arthropoda
- Class: Insecta
- Order: Lepidoptera
- Superfamily: Noctuoidea
- Family: Noctuidae (?)
- Subfamily: Catocalinae
- Genus: Axiocteta; Turner, 1902

Genus of moths

Axiocteta is a genus of moths of the family Noctuidae. The genus was described by Turner in 1902.

== Species ==
- Axiocteta babooni Bethune-Baker, 1906
- Axiocteta concolora Bethune-Baker, 1906
- Axiocteta encampina Hampson, 1926
- Axiocteta flava Bethune-Baker, 1906
- Axiocteta metaleuca Hampson, 1926
- Axiocteta obliqua Bethune-Baker, 1906
- Axiocteta oenoplex Turner, 1902
- Axiocteta rufa Bethune-Baker, 1906
- Axiocteta subuniformis Rothschild, 1915
- Axiocteta turneri Bethune-Baker, 1906
