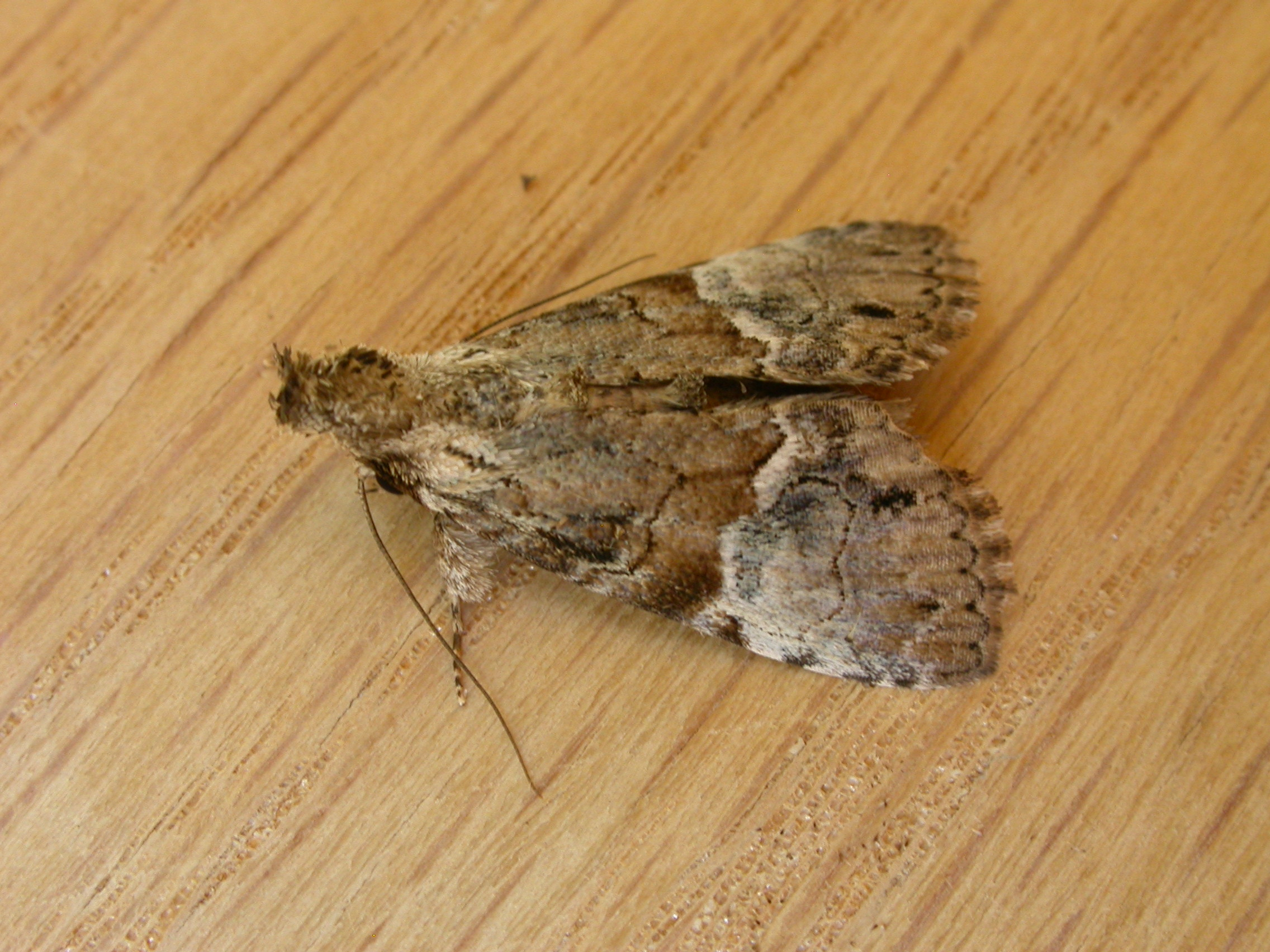
- Alophosoma emmelopis

Scientific classification
- Kingdom: Animalia
- Phylum: Arthropoda
- Class: Insecta
- Order: Lepidoptera
- Superfamily: Noctuoidea
- Family: Noctuidae (?)
- Subfamily: Catocalinae
- Genus: Alophosoma; Turner, 1929

= Alophosoma =

Genus of moths

Alophosoma is a genus of moths of the family Noctuidae described by Turner in 1929.

== Species ==
- Alophosoma emmelopis (Turner, 1929)
- Alophosoma hypoxantha (Lower, 1902)
- Alophosoma pallidula Turner, 1936
- Alophosoma syngenes Turner, 1929

== Bibliography ==
- Pitkin, Brian & Jenkins, Paul (November 5, 2004). "Alophosoma Turner, 1929". Butterflies and Moths of the World. Natural History Museum, London.
