= Niguza oculita =

Scientific classification
- Domain: Eukaryota
- Kingdom: Animalia
- Phylum: Arthropoda
- Class: Insecta
- Order: Lepidoptera
- Superfamily: Noctuoidea
- Family: Erebidae
- Genus: Niguza
- Species: N. oculita

Binomial name
- Niguza oculita (Swinhoe, 1901)

Species of moth

Niguza oculita is a species of moth of the family Erebidae first described by Charles Swinhoe in 1901. It is found in Australia, including the Wessel Islands.
