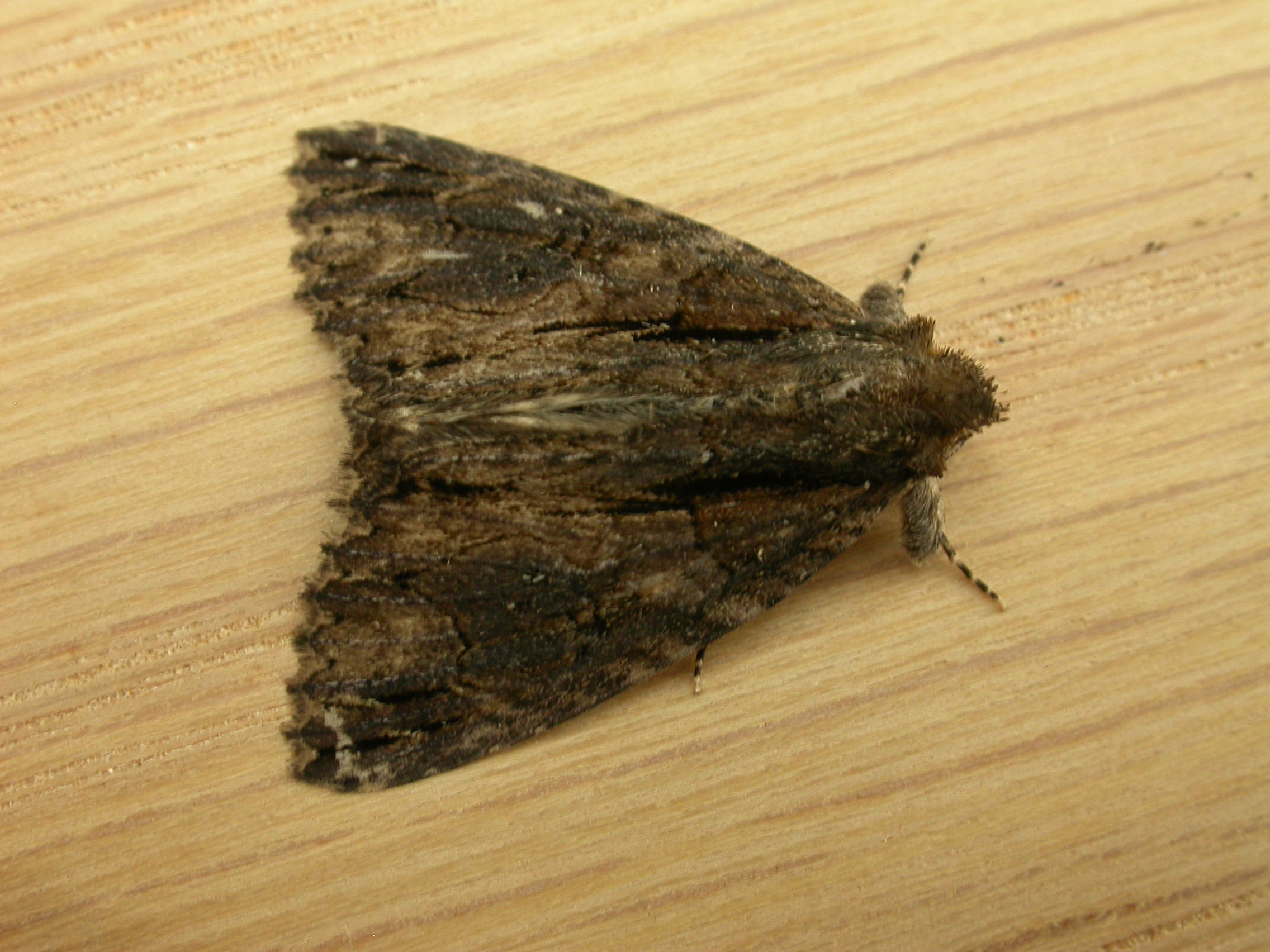

Scientific classification
- Domain: Eukaryota
- Kingdom: Animalia
- Phylum: Arthropoda
- Class: Insecta
- Order: Lepidoptera
- Superfamily: Noctuoidea
- Family: Erebidae
- Genus: Crioa
- Species: C. hades

Binomial name
- Crioa hades Lower, 1903

= Crioa hades =

Species of moth

Crioa hades is a species of moth of the family Erebidae first described by Oswald Bertram Lower in 1903. It is found in Australia.
