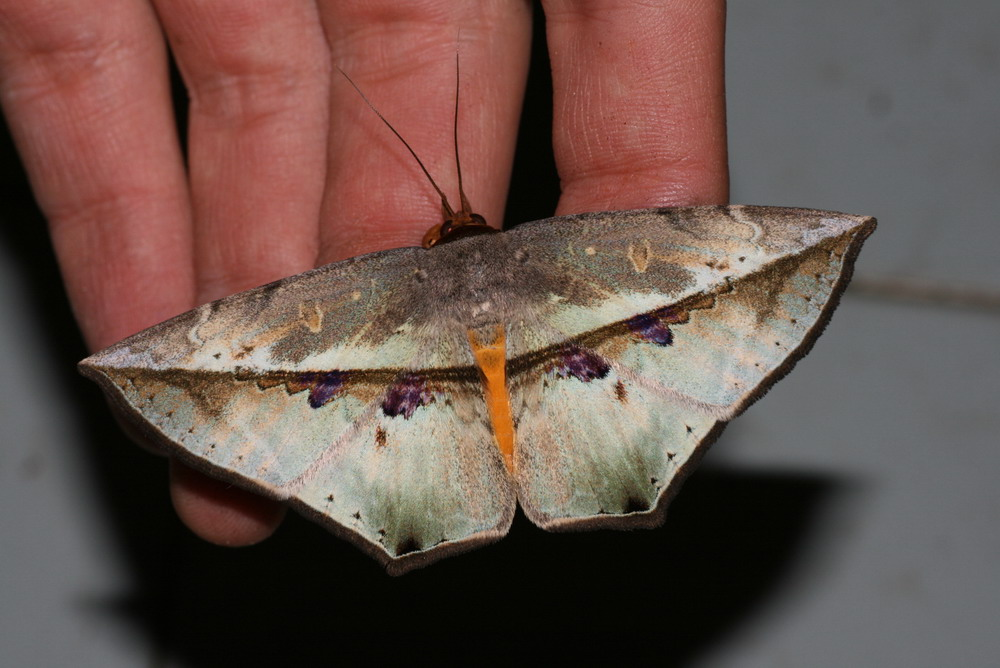

Scientific classification
- Domain: Eukaryota
- Kingdom: Animalia
- Phylum: Arthropoda
- Class: Insecta
- Order: Lepidoptera
- Superfamily: Noctuoidea
- Family: Erebidae
- Genus: Hexamitoptera (Pagenstecher, 1885)
- Species: H. lawinda

Binomial name
- Hexamitoptera lawinda Pagenstecker, 1885

Synonyms
- Generic: Poeciloptera Pagenstecher, 1885 (preocc.); Specific: Hypopyra lawinda Pagenstecher, 1885; Hexamitoptera lavinda Hampson, 1913

= Hexamitoptera =

Genus of moths

Hexamitoptera is a monotypic moth genus in the family Erebidae. Its only species, Hexamitoptera lawinda, is found in Indonesia (Nias, Sumatra), Peninsular Malaysia and Borneo. The habitat consists of lowland dipterocarp forests. Both the genus and the species were first described by Pagenstecher in 1885.
