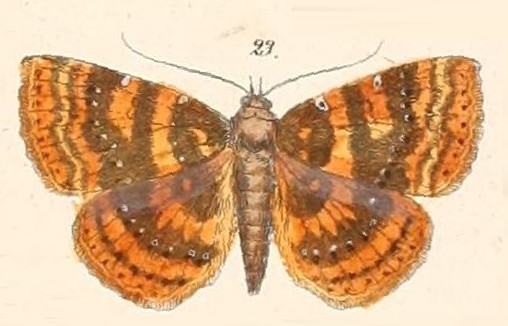
- Attonda adspersa

Scientific classification
- Domain: Eukaryota
- Kingdom: Animalia
- Phylum: Arthropoda
- Class: Insecta
- Order: Lepidoptera
- Superfamily: Noctuoidea
- Family: Erebidae
- Subfamily: Calpinae
- Genus: Attonda; Swinhoe, 1919

= Attonda =

Genus of moths

Attonda is a genus of moths of the family Erebidae.

== Species ==
- Attonda adspersa (Felder & Rogenhofer 1874)
- Attonda ekeikei (Bethune-Baker 1906)
- Attonda nana (Holland 1894)
- Attonda trifasciata (Moore, 1877)
