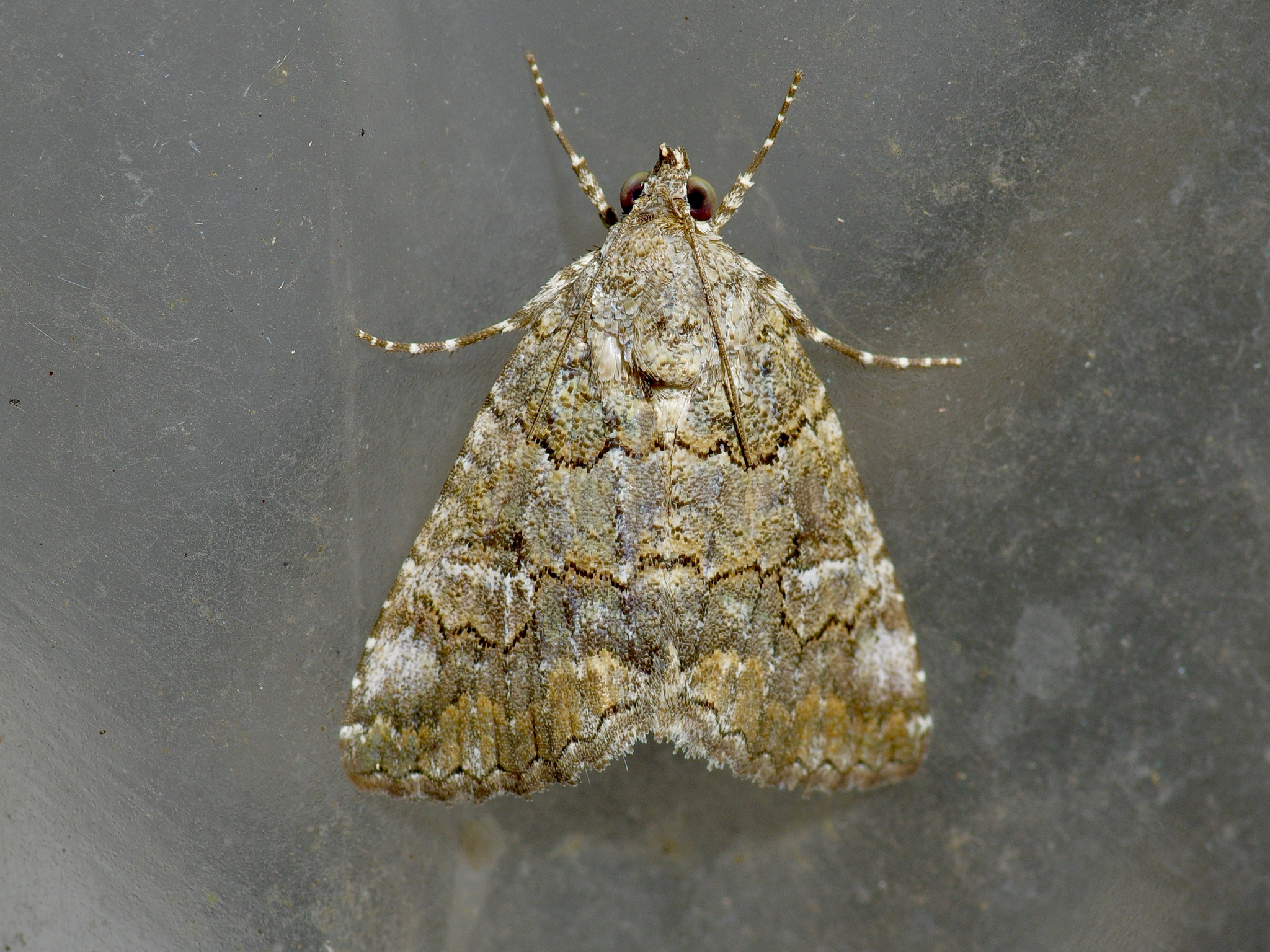

Scientific classification
- Domain: Eukaryota
- Kingdom: Animalia
- Phylum: Arthropoda
- Class: Insecta
- Order: Lepidoptera
- Superfamily: Noctuoidea
- Family: Erebidae
- Genus: Eubolina; Harvey, 1875
- Species: E. impartialis

Binomial name
- Eubolina impartialis Harvey, 1875

= Eubolina =

Eubolina moth

Genus of moths

Eubolina is a monotypic moth genus in the family Erebidae. Its only species, Eubolina impartialis, commonly known as the eubolina moth, is found in the United States, mostly in southern Texas. Both the genus and the species were first described by Leon F. Harvey in 1875.
