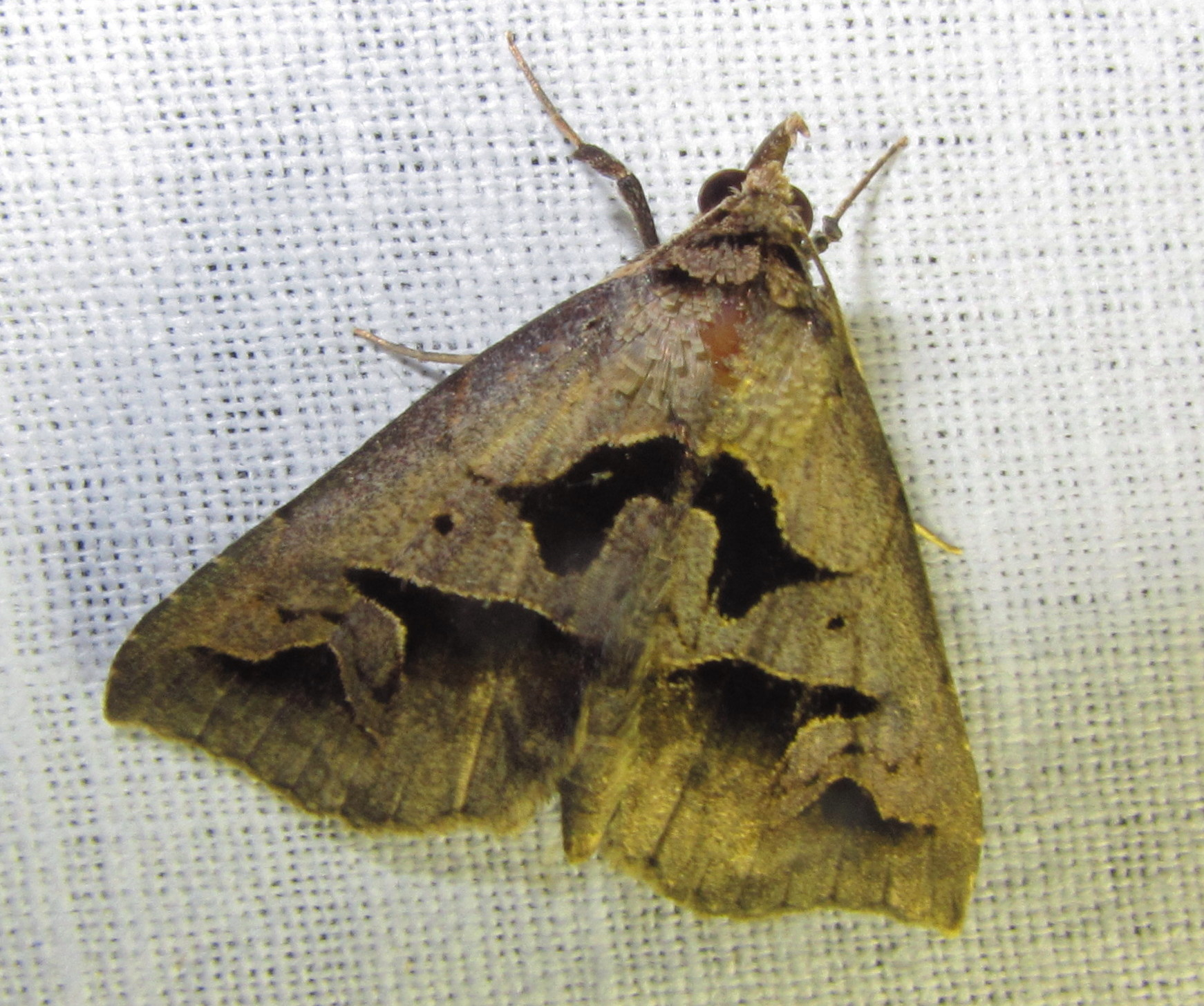

Scientific classification
- Kingdom: Animalia
- Phylum: Arthropoda
- Class: Insecta
- Order: Lepidoptera
- Superfamily: Noctuoidea
- Family: Erebidae
- Genus: Tephriopis; Hampson, 1926
- Species: T. divulsa

Binomial name
- Tephriopis divulsa (Walker, 1865)

Synonyms
- Athyrma divulsa Walker, 1865; Capnodes arabescalis Snellen, 1880

= Tephriopis =

Genus of moths

Tephriopis is a monotypic moth genus of the family Erebidae. Its only species, Tephriopis divulsa, was first described by Francis Walker in 1865.

== Distribution ==
It is found in Sri Lanka, the Indian subregion, Bangladesh, Myanmar, Thailand, the Andaman Islands, Borneo and Sulawesi.

== Description ==
Forewings have a striking pattern with black and grey. Body greenish brown with the dark bands broken by pale lines on the veins. Distal margin distinctly angled obtusely at the centre. Antennae of male serrate and strongly fasciculate. The caterpillar is cylindrical with a dark rusty-brown head mottled with green. Body pale ochraceous olive green with a smoky-brown suffusion. Pupation takes place in a cell of leaves made by silk. Pupa lacks bloom. Caterpillars are known to feed on Dalbergia and Pterocarpus species.
