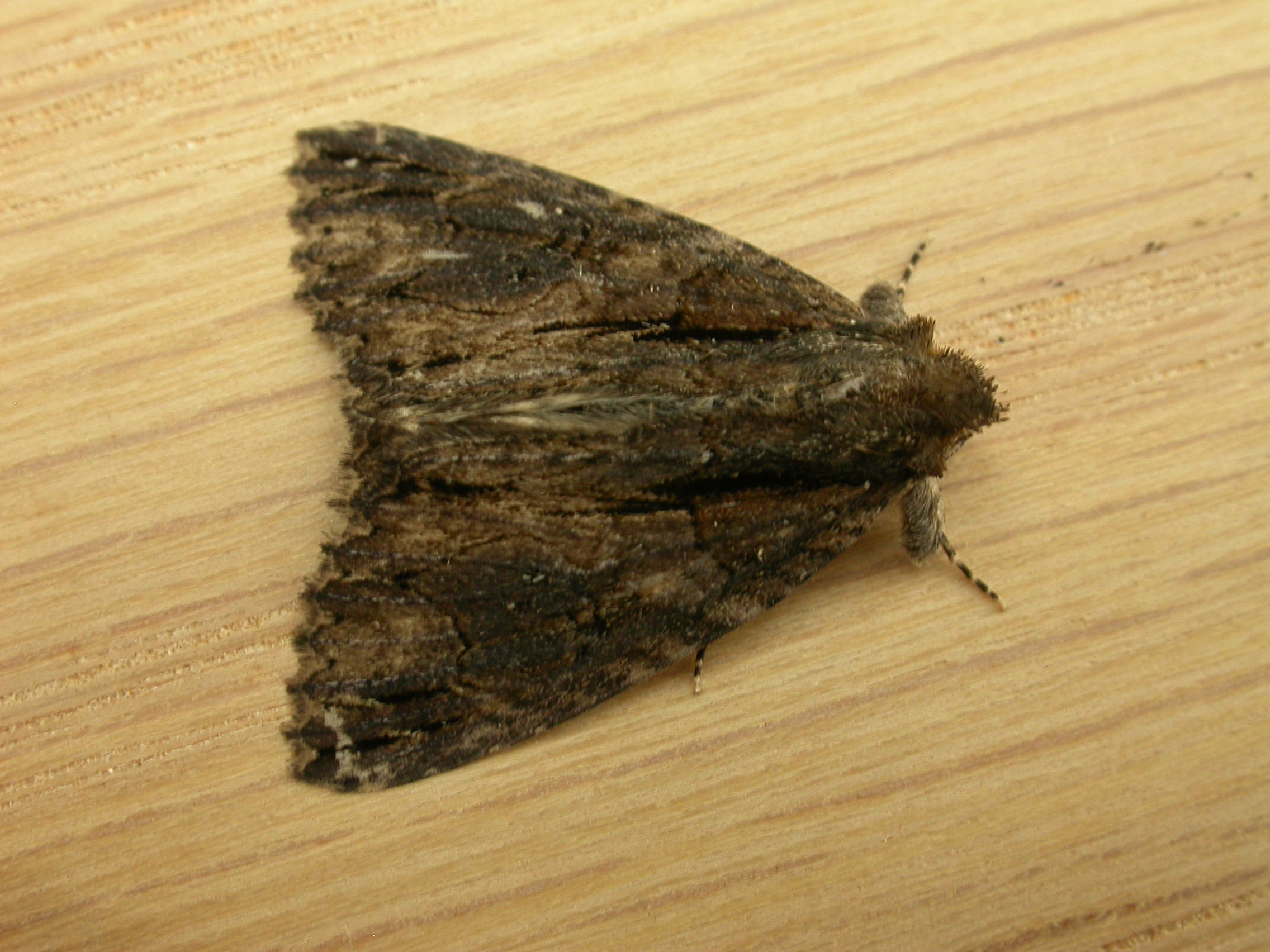
- Crioa hades

Scientific classification
- Kingdom: Animalia
- Phylum: Arthropoda
- Class: Insecta
- Order: Lepidoptera
- Superfamily: Noctuoidea
- Family: Erebidae
- Subfamily: Calpinae
- Genus: Crioa; Walker, [1858]

Synonyms
- Piana Walker, 1869

= Crioa =

Genus of moths

Crioa is a genus of moths of the family Erebidae. The genus was erected by Francis Walker in 1858. It is found in Australia.

== Species ==
- Crioa acronyctoides Walker, [1858]
- Crioa aroa Bethune-Baker, 1908
- Crioa hades Lower, 1903
- Crioa indistincta Walker, 1865
