= Pseudanthracia =

Scientific classification
- Kingdom: Animalia
- Phylum: Arthropoda
- Class: Insecta
- Order: Lepidoptera
- Superfamily: Noctuoidea
- Family: Erebidae
- Genus: Pseudanthracia; Grote, 1874
- Species: P. coracias

Binomial name
- Pseudanthracia coracias Guenée, 1852

Genus of moths

Pseudanthracia is a monotypic moth genus in the family Erebidae erected by Augustus Radcliffe Grote in 1874. Its only species, Pseudanthracia coracias, the pseudanthracia moth, was first described by Achille Guenée in 1852. It is found in the southern United States, most commonly around Florida.
