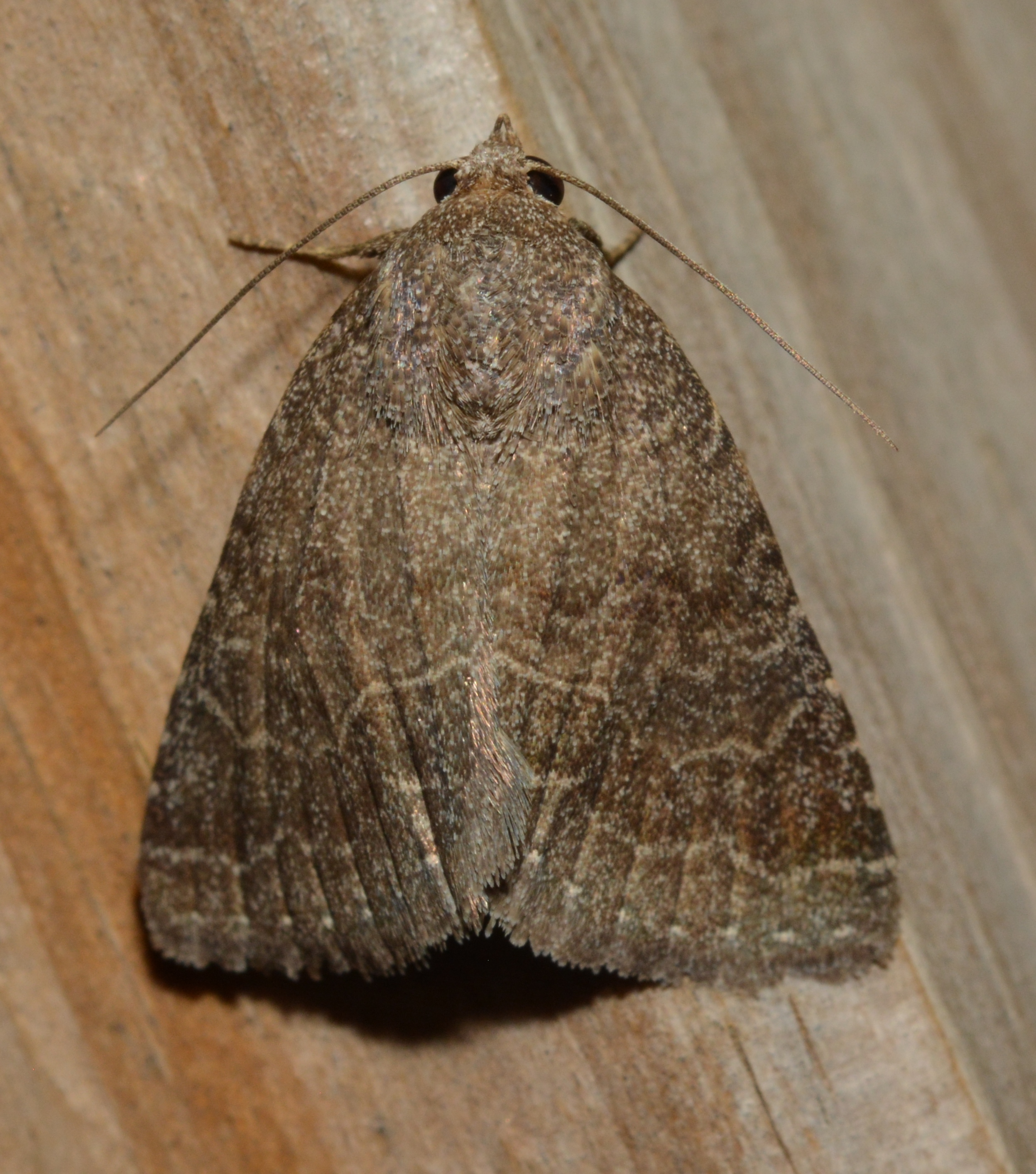
- Matigramma pulverilinea

Scientific classification
- Kingdom: Animalia
- Phylum: Arthropoda
- Class: Insecta
- Order: Lepidoptera
- Superfamily: Noctuoidea
- Family: Erebidae
- Tribe: Omopterini
- Genus: Matigramma; Grote, 1872

= Matigramma =

Genus of moths

Matigramma is a genus of moths in the family Erebidae. The genus was erected by Augustus Radcliffe Grote in 1872.

== Species ==
- Matigramma aderces Franclemont, 1986 Mexico
- Matigramma adoceta Franclemont, 1986 Arizona
- Matigramma emmilta Franclemont, 1986 Arizona, western Texas
- Matigramma inopinata Franclemont, 1986 Texas, Arizona
- Matigramma necopina Franclemont, 1986 Mexico
- Matigramma obscurior Frnaclemont & Todd, 1983 Texas
- Matigramma pulverilinea Grote, 1872 Florida - Texas, southern Kansas, southern Missouri – dusty-lined matigramma moth
- Matigramma repentina Franclemont, 1986 Arizona, Mexico
- Matigramma rubrosuffusa Grote, 1882 Arizona, Texas, Mexico

== Former species ==
- Matigramma metaleuca is now Acritogramma metaleuca (Hampson, 1913)
