= Iontha =

Scientific classification
- Kingdom: Animalia
- Phylum: Arthropoda
- Class: Insecta
- Order: Lepidoptera
- Superfamily: Noctuoidea
- Family: Erebidae
- Subfamily: Calpinae
- Genus: Iontha; E. Doubleday, 1842

Genus of moths

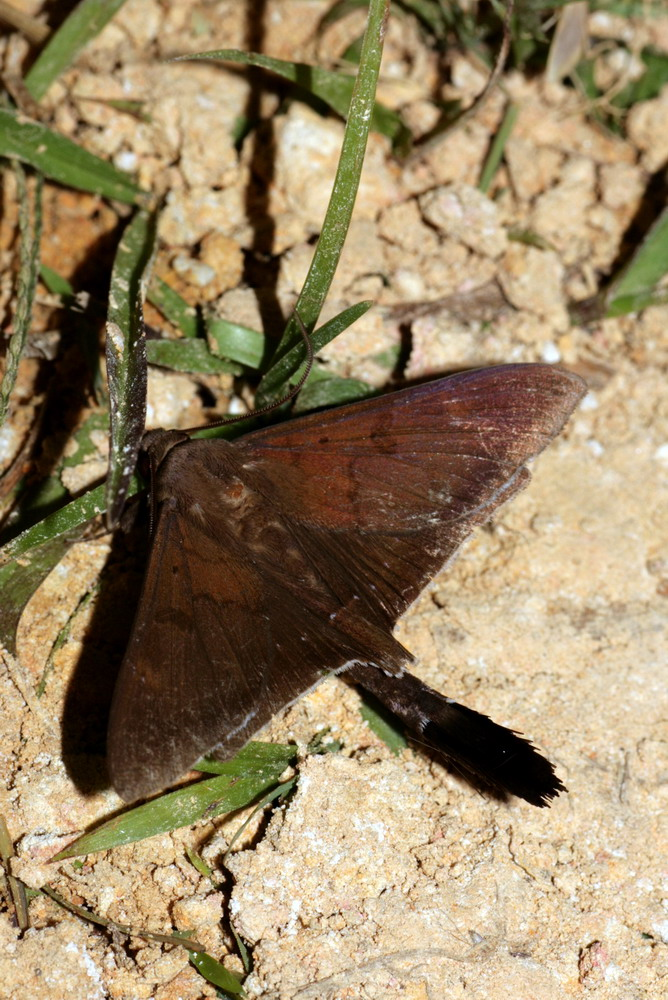
Iontha umbrina

Iontha is a genus of moths of the family Erebidae. The genus was erected by Edward Doubleday in 1842.

== Species ==
- Iontha acerces L. B. Prout, 1928 Sumatra
- Iontha ida Banks, 1919 Philippines (Luzon)
- Iontha umbrina E. Doubleday, 1842 Bengal, Singapore, Borneo
