= Varicosia =

Scientific classification
- Kingdom: Animalia
- Phylum: Arthropoda
- Class: Insecta
- Order: Lepidoptera
- Superfamily: Noctuoidea
- Family: Erebidae
- Subfamily: Calpinae
- Genus: Varicosia; Hampson, 1924

Genus of moths

Varicosia is a genus of moths of the family Erebidae. The genus was erected by George Hampson in 1924.

== Species ==
- Varicosia clavifera A. E. Prout, 1928
- Varicosia venata Hampson, 1924
