= Anydrophila =

Scientific classification
- Domain: Eukaryota
- Kingdom: Animalia
- Phylum: Mollusca
- Class: Gastropoda
- Order: Stylommatophora
- Family: Amphibulimidae
- Genus: Anydrophila; John, 1909

Genus of moths

Anydrophila is a genus of moths of the family Noctuidae.

== Selected species ==
- Anydrophila mirifica (Erschoff, 1874)
- Anydrophila sabouraudi (D. Lucas, 1907)
- Anydrophila stuebeli (Calberla, 1891) (formerly Drasteria stuebeli)
