= Xenogenes =

Scientific classification
- Kingdom: Animalia
- Phylum: Arthropoda
- Class: Insecta
- Order: Lepidoptera
- Superfamily: Noctuoidea
- Family: Erebidae
- Subfamily: Erebinae
- Genus: Xenogenes; Meyrick in L. B. Prout, 1910

Synonyms
- Pediarcha Turner, 1936

Genus of moths

Xenogenes is a genus of moths in the family Erebidae. The genus was erected by Edward Meyrick in 1910. Both species are found in Australia.

== Species ==
- Xenogenes chrysoplaca Meyrick, 1910 Queensland
- Xenogenes gloriosa (T. P. Lucas, 1891) New South Wales, Queensland
