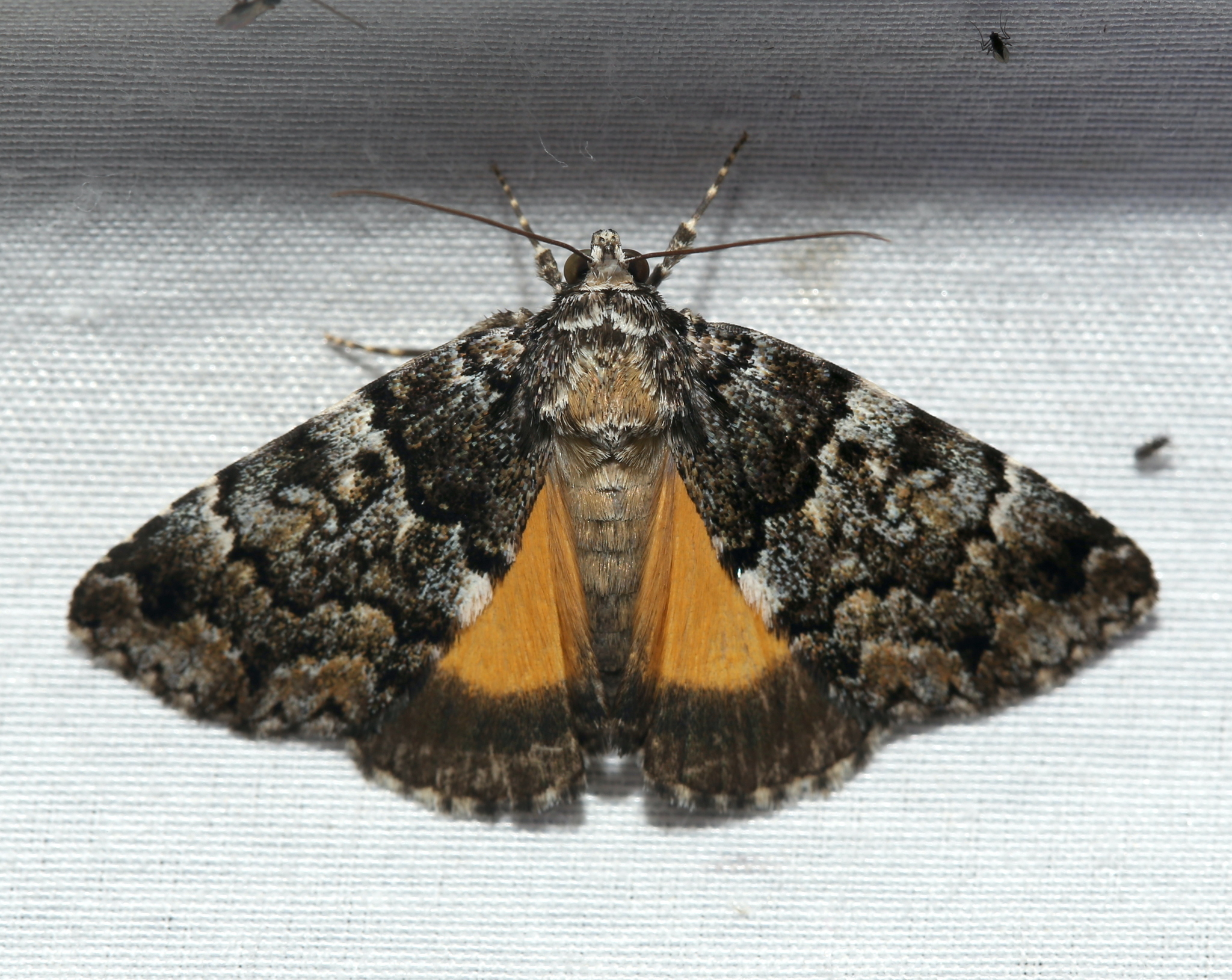

Scientific classification
- Kingdom: Animalia
- Phylum: Arthropoda
- Clade: Pancrustacea
- Class: Insecta
- Order: Lepidoptera
- Superfamily: Noctuoidea
- Family: Erebidae
- Genus: Allotria (Hübner, 1818)
- Species: A. elonympha

Binomial name
- Allotria elonympha Hübner, [1823]

Synonyms
- Ephesia elonympha Hübner, 1818

= Allotria =

Genus of moths

Allotria is a genus of moths in the family Erebidae. It is monotypic, with only a single species, Allotria elonympha, the false underwing moth, which is found in eastern North America. Both the genus and the species were first described by Jacob Hübner, the genus in 1823 and the species in 1818.

The wingspan is 33–44 mm. Adults are on wing from March to September.

The larvae feed on various deciduous trees, such as black gum (Nyssa sylvatica), hickory and walnut.
