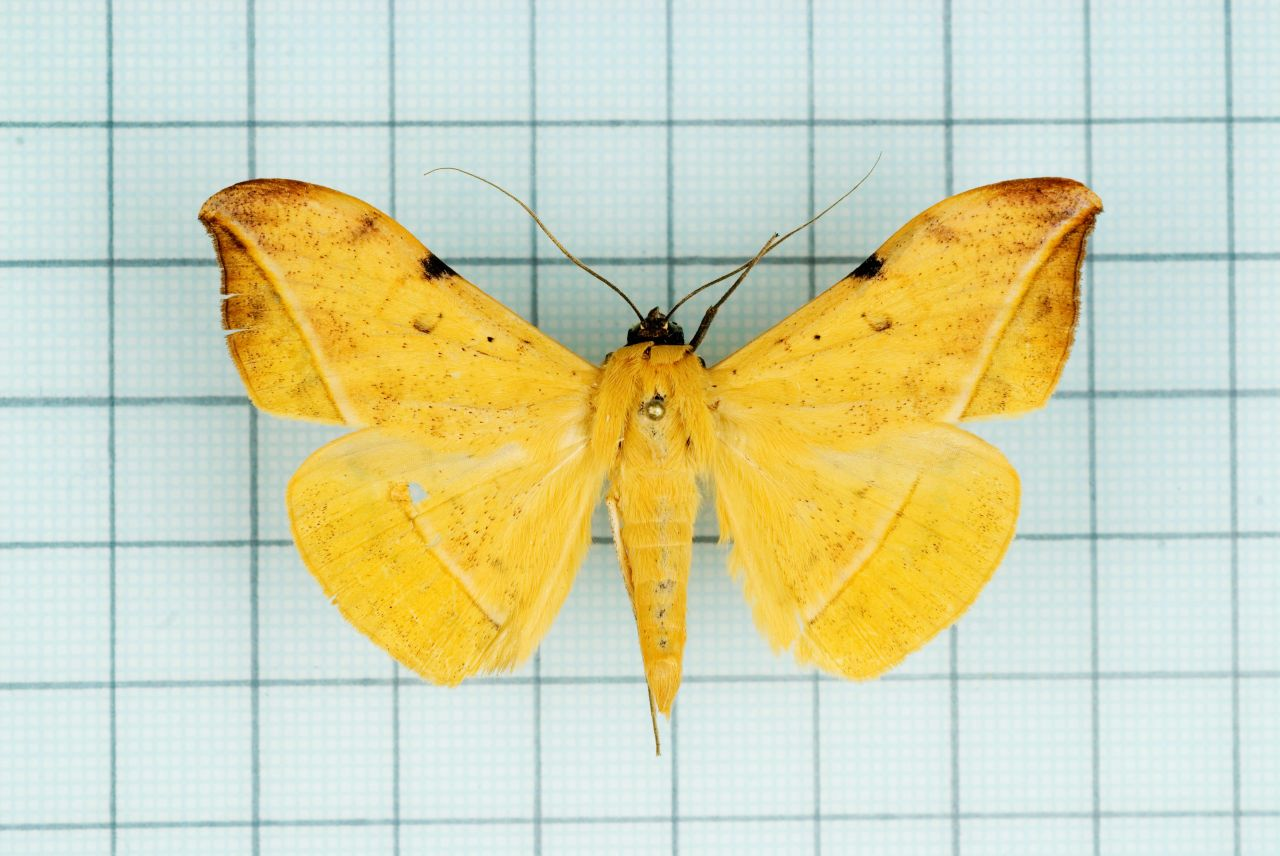
- Hamodes propitia

Scientific classification
- Kingdom: Animalia
- Phylum: Arthropoda
- Class: Insecta
- Order: Lepidoptera
- Superfamily: Noctuoidea
- Family: Erebidae
- Subfamily: Calpinae
- Genus: Hamodes; Guenée in Boisduval & Guenée, 1852

Synonyms
- Kalmina Swinhoe 1891

= Hamodes =

Genus of moths

Hamodes is a genus of moths of the family Erebidae. The genus was erected by Achille Guenée in 1852.

== Species ==
- Hamodes butleri (Leech, 1900)
- Hamodes crebrerrima Snellen, 1877
- Hamodes lutea (Walker, 1863)
- Hamodes pallida Felder, 1861
- Hamodes pendleburyi Prout, 1932
- Hamodes propitia Boisduval, 1832
- Hamodes simplicia Weymer, 1892
- Hamodes unilinea Swinhoe, 1890
