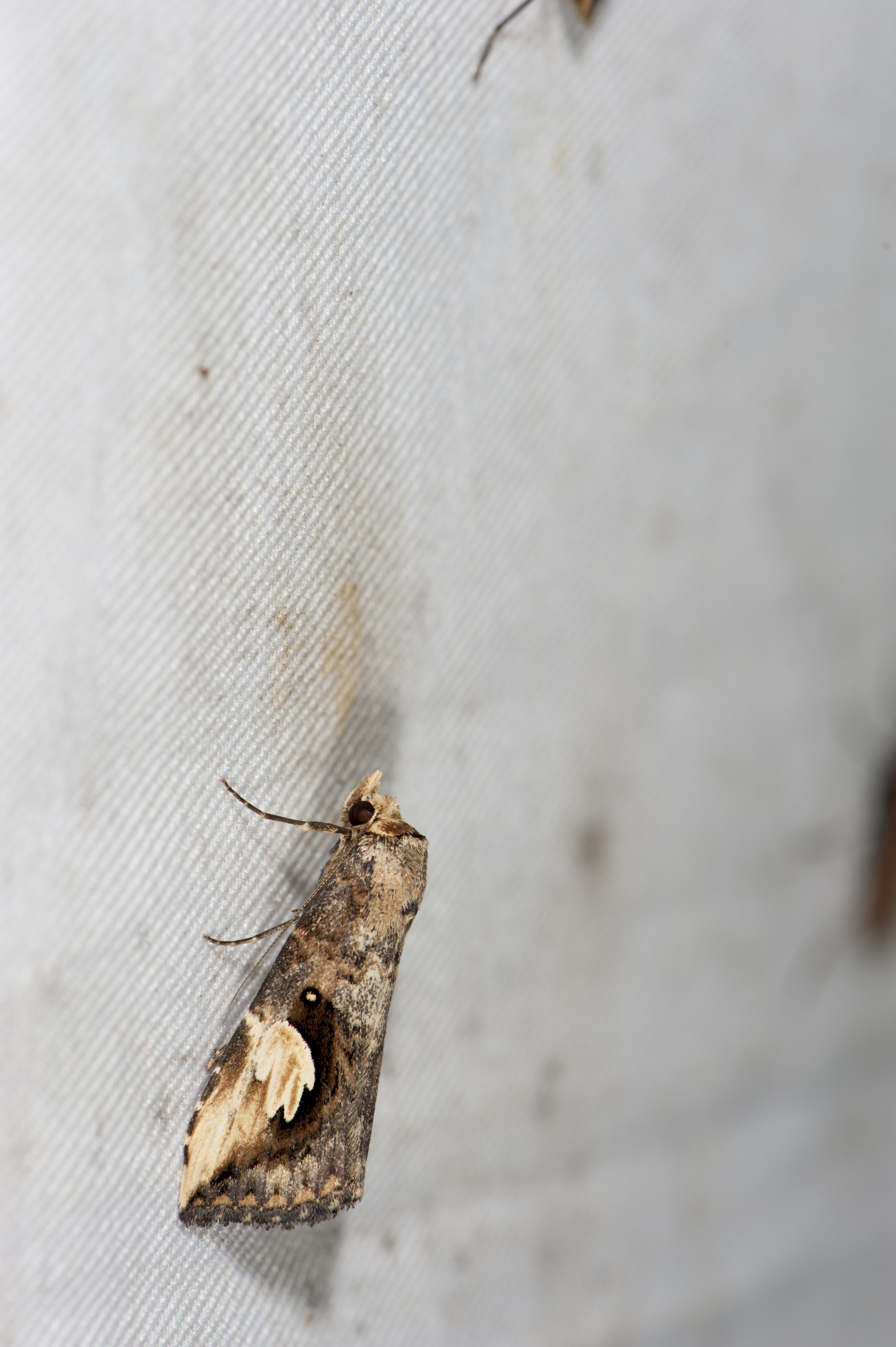
- Pseudosphetta moorei moth

Scientific classification
- Kingdom: Animalia
- Phylum: Arthropoda
- Class: Insecta
- Order: Lepidoptera
- Superfamily: Noctuoidea
- Family: Erebidae
- Subfamily: Calpinae
- Genus: Pseudosphetta; Hampson, 1926

= Pseudosphetta =

Genus of moths

Pseudosphetta is a genus of moths of the family Erebidae. The genus was erected by George Hampson in 1926.

== Species ==
- Pseudosphetta fissigna Hampson, 1926 Thailand, Peninsular Malaysia, Sumatra, Borneo
- Pseudosphetta moorei (Cotes & Swinhoe, 1887) Sri Lanka, Andamans, India, Thailand, Taiwan, Peninsular Malaysia, Sumatra, Borneo, Sulawesi, Seram
- Pseudosphetta umbrosa Holloway, 2005 Borneo, Sumatra
