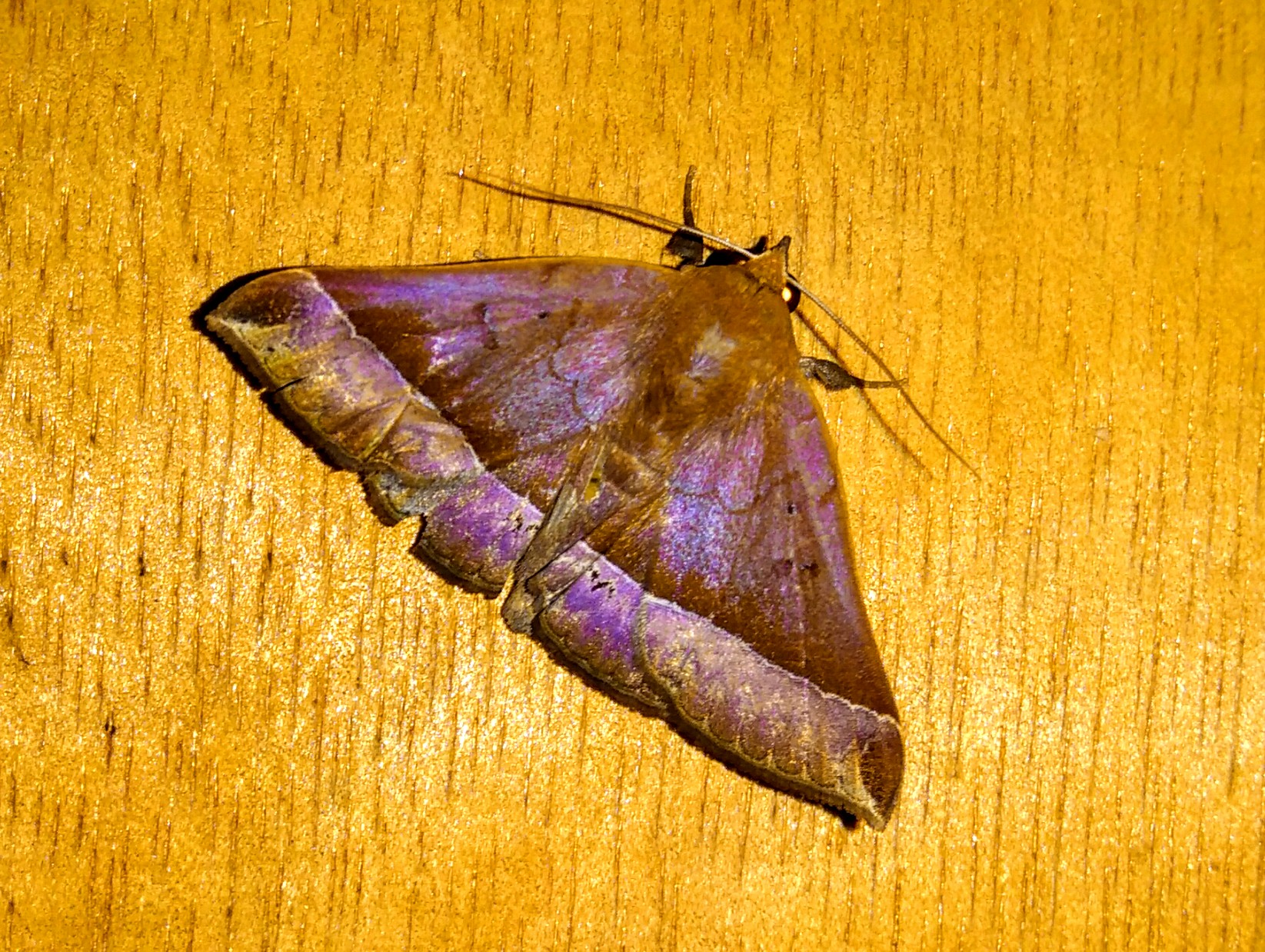

Scientific classification
- Kingdom: Animalia
- Phylum: Arthropoda
- Class: Insecta
- Order: Lepidoptera
- Superfamily: Noctuoidea
- Family: Erebidae
- Subfamily: Calpinae
- Genus: Delgamma; Moore, [1885]
- Species: D. pangonia

Binomial name
- Delgamma pangonia (Guenée, 1852)

Synonyms
- Bendis pangonia Guenée, 1852; Naxia calorifica Walker, 1858; Delgamma sanctae Prout, 1927

= Delgamma =

Strawberry cutworm

Genus of moths

Delgamma is a monotypic moth genus of the family Noctuidae erected by Frederic Moore in 1885. Its only species, Delgamma pangonia, the strawberry cutworm, was first described by Achille Guenée in 1852.

== Distribution ==
It is found in tropical countries such as India, Sri Lanka, Bangladesh, the Philippines, Thailand, São Tomé, parts of Africa, and Australia.

== Description ==
Palpi upturned, where the second joint reaches the vertex of the head, and smoothly scaled, with and moderate-length third joint. A short frontal tuft is present. Antennae fasciculate in males. The thorax and abdomen are smoothly scaled. Tibia spineless and moderately hairy. Hind tarsi with the first joint fringed above. Forewings with somewhat acute apex. Hindwings of males with the cell short and a large oval depression beyond it, veins 6 and 7 being bent and approaching vein 8. Veins 4 and 5 are depressed and running along vein 3 to near the margin.

The wingspan is about 4 cm. An adult has bright brown wings, each with a broad pale margin. Forewings have a dark triangle at the tip of each wing tinged with a purplish shine. The caterpillar is humped without tubercles and brownish with grey dots. The first two pairs of prolegs are reduced. Head pale pinkish to whitish with dark lines. Pupa has a white bloom. The caterpillar is a serious pest on strawberries, as well as other plants in the genus Connarus.
