= Ocalaria =

Scientific classification
- Domain: Eukaryota
- Kingdom: Animalia
- Phylum: Arthropoda
- Class: Insecta
- Order: Lepidoptera
- Superfamily: Noctuoidea
- Family: Erebidae
- Subfamily: Calpinae
- Genus: Ocalaria; Schaus, 1906

Genus of moths

Ocalaria is a genus of moths of the family Erebidae. The genus was described by William Schaus in 1906.

== Species ==
- Ocalaria cohabita Kitching, 1988 Panama
- Ocalaria dioptica (Walker, 1865) Brazil (Amazonas), Bolivia, French Guiana
- Ocalaria guarana Schaus, 1906 Brazil (São Paulo)
- Ocalaria oculata (Druce, 1898) Guatemala
- Ocalaria pavina Schaus, 1916 Brazil (Rio de Janeiro)
- Ocalaria pavo Schaus, 1913 Costa Rica
- Ocalaria quadriocellata (Walker, 1865) Brazil (Rio de Janeiro)
