= Sciatta =

Scientific classification
- Kingdom: Animalia
- Phylum: Arthropoda
- Class: Insecta
- Order: Lepidoptera
- Superfamily: Noctuoidea
- Family: Noctuidae
- Genus: Sciatta; Walker, 1869

Type species
- Sciatta inconcisa Walker, 1869

Genus of moths

Sciatta is a genus of moths of the family Noctuidae. The genus was erected by Francis Walker in 1869.

== Species ==
Some species of this genus are:

- Sciatta debeauxi (Berio, 1937)
- Sciatta delphinensis (Viette, 1966)
- Sciatta inconcisa Walker, 1869
- Sciatta remota (H. Druce, 1887)
