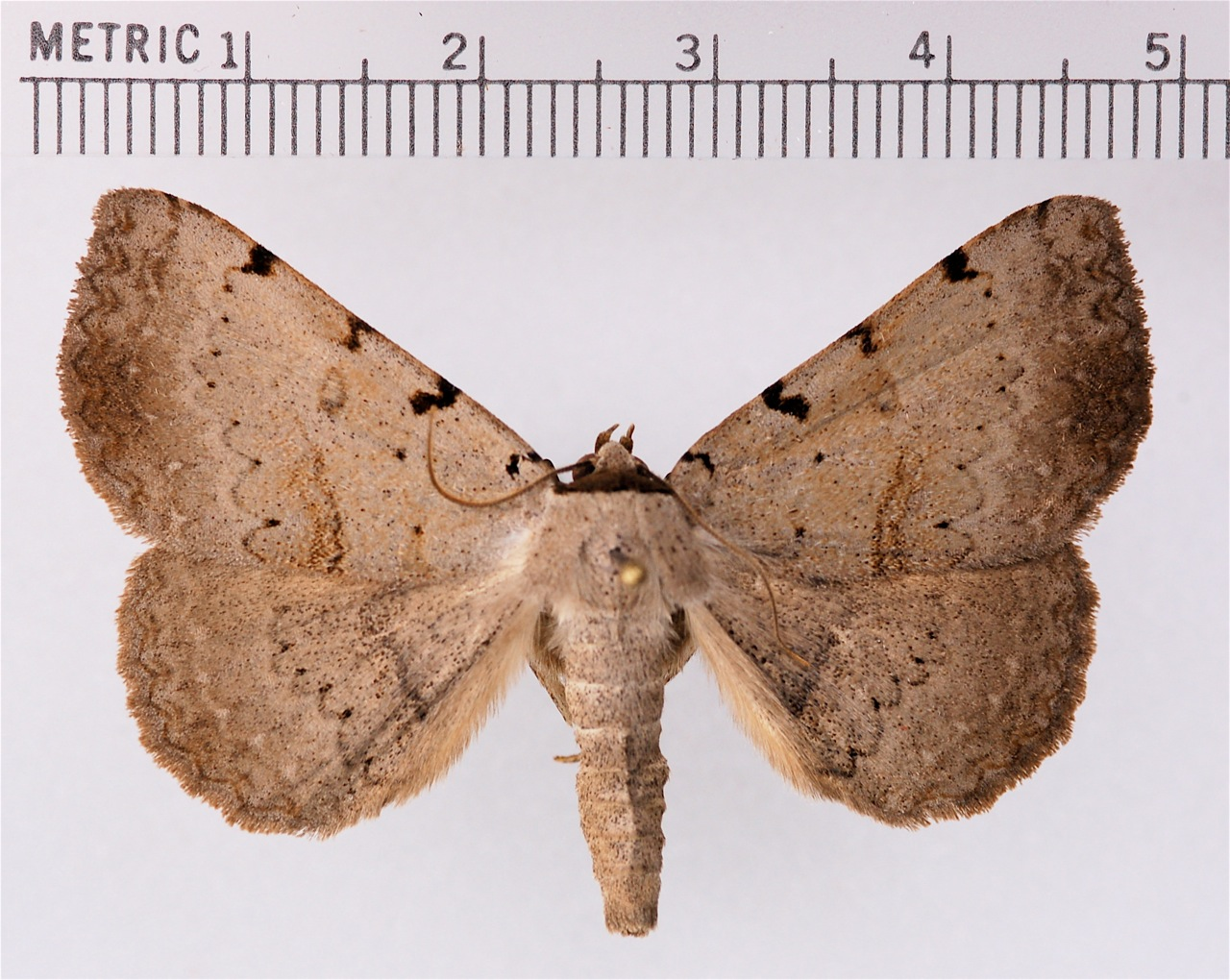

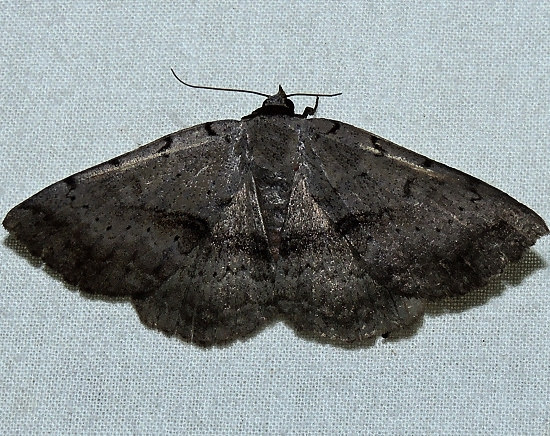

Scientific classification
- Domain: Eukaryota
- Kingdom: Animalia
- Phylum: Arthropoda
- Class: Insecta
- Order: Lepidoptera
- Superfamily: Noctuoidea
- Family: Erebidae
- Genus: Spiloloma; Grote, 1873
- Species: S. lunilinea

Binomial name
- Spiloloma lunilinea Grote, 1873

Synonyms
- Strenoloma Grote, 1880

= Spiloloma =

Genus of insects

Spiloloma is a monotypic moth genus in the family Erebidae. Its only species, Spiloloma lunilinea, the moon-lined moth, is found in eastern and south-central North America. Both the genus and species were first described by Augustus Radcliffe Grote in 1873.

The wingspan is 44–54 mm (1.7–2.1 in). Adults are on wing from April to August.

The larvae feed on Gleditsia triacanthos.
