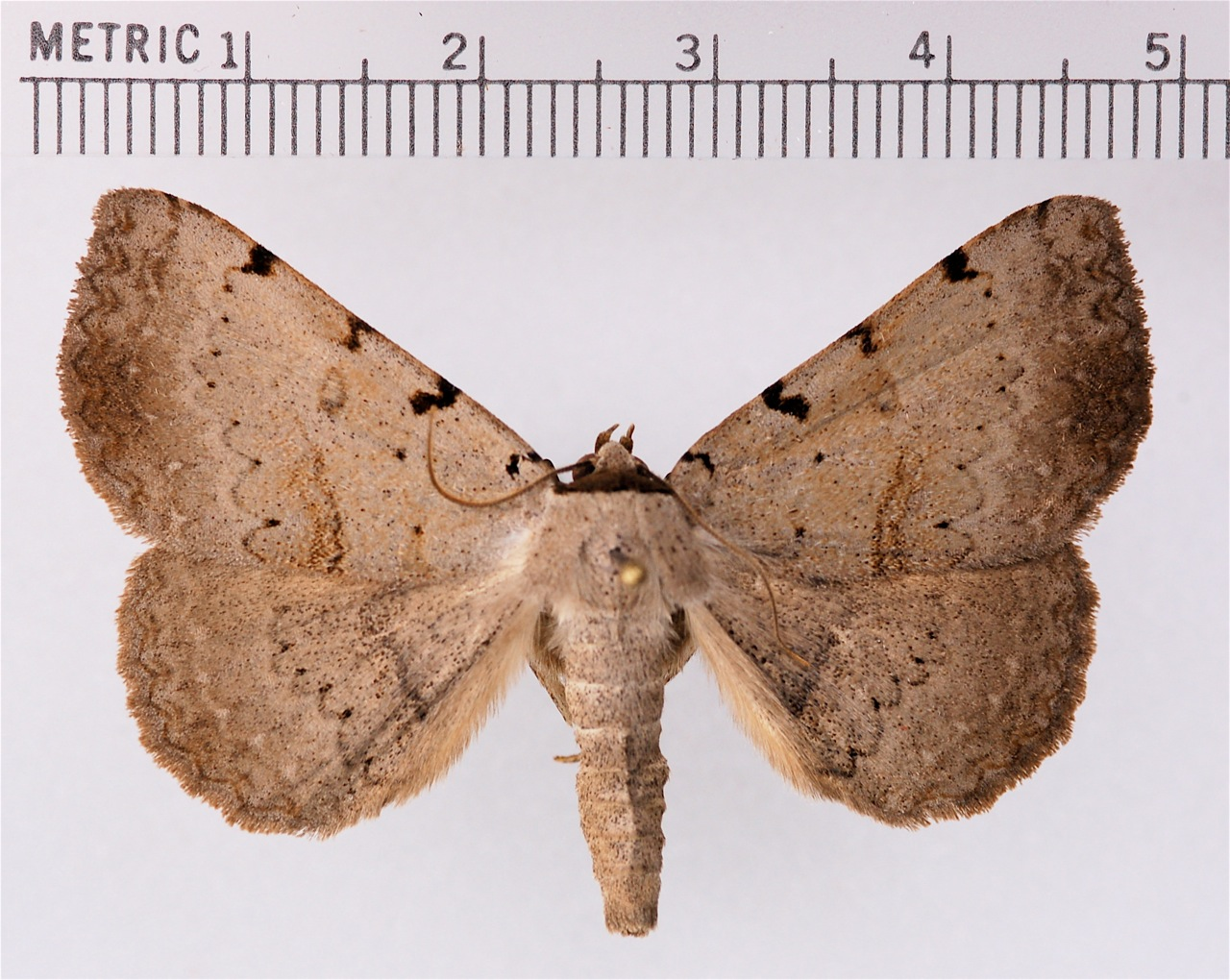
- Spiloloma lunilinea

Scientific classification
- Domain: Eukaryota
- Kingdom: Animalia
- Phylum: Arthropoda
- Class: Insecta
- Order: Lepidoptera
- Superfamily: Noctuoidea
- Family: Erebidae
- Subfamily: Erebinae
- Tribe: Catocalini; Boisduval, [1828]

Synonyms
- Catocalina

= Catocalini =

Tribe of moths

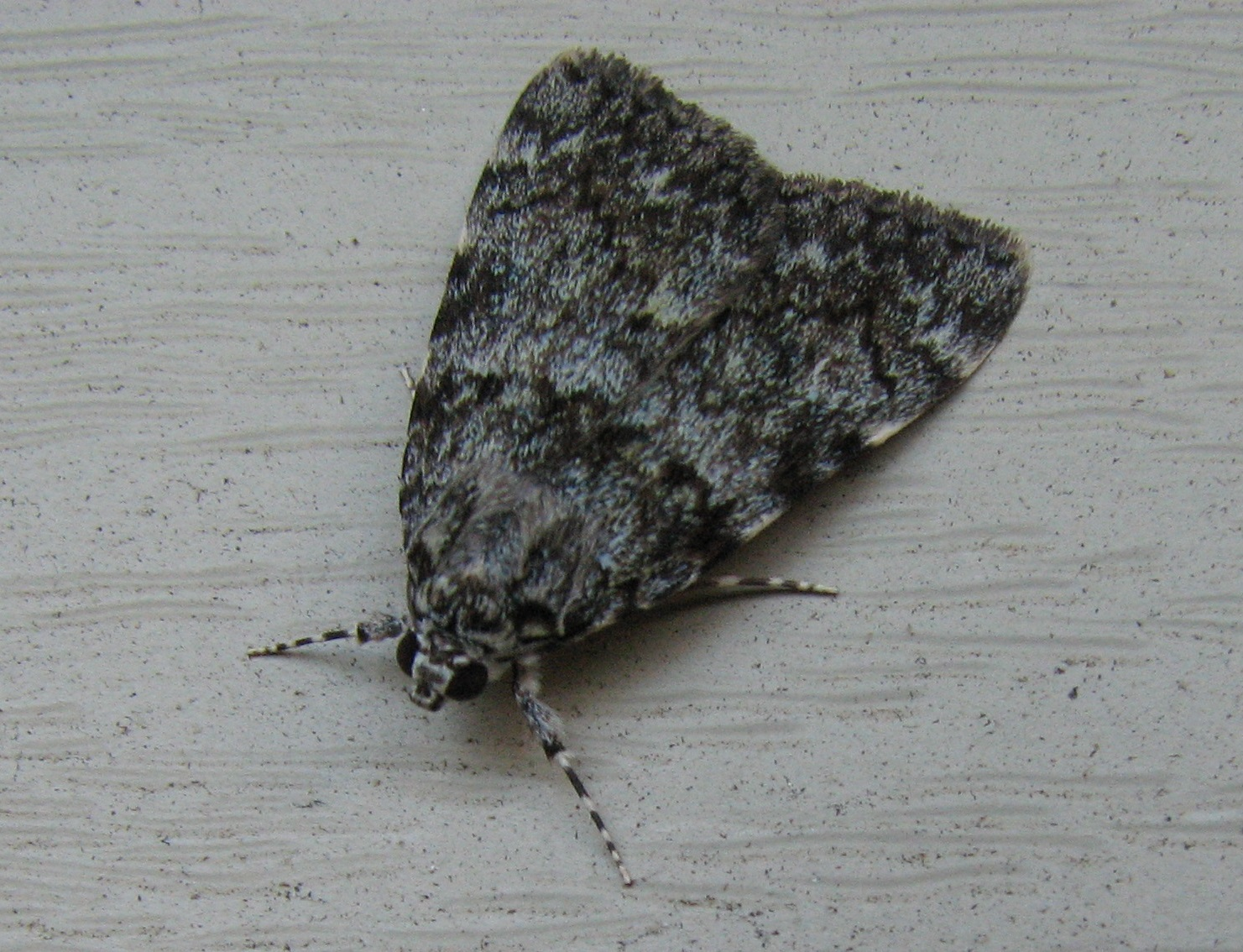
Catocala lineella

The Catocalini are a tribe of moths in the family Erebidae. Adults of many species in the tribe are called underwing moths due to their vividly colored hindwings that are often covered by contrastingly dark, drab forewings.

== Taxonomy ==
The tribe is most closely related to the tribe Audeini, also within the Erebinae.

== Genera ==
- Archaeopilocornus Kühne, 2005
- Catocala
- Spiloloma
- Tachosa
- Ulotrichopus

== Former genera ==
- Artena
- Audea
- Crypsotidia
- Hypotacha
- Mecodina
