= Athyrma =

Scientific classification
- Kingdom: Animalia
- Phylum: Arthropoda
- Clade: Pancrustacea
- Class: Insecta
- Order: Lepidoptera
- Superfamily: Noctuoidea
- Family: Erebidae
- Subfamily: Eulepidotinae
- Genus: Athyrma; Hübner, [1823]

Genus of moths

Athyrma moth in Serra do Mar State Park.

Athyrma is a genus of moths in the family Erebidae.

== Species ==
- Athyrma adjutrix Cramer, [1780]
- Athyrma brigittae Adams & McCabe, 2022
- Athyrma ciboney Adams & McCabe, 2022
- Athyrma cryani Adams & McCabe, 2022
- Athyrma dormitrix Guene in Boisduval and Guene, 1852 (syn. Athyrma cunesema Hampson 1926)
- Athyrma fakahatchee Troubridge, 2020
- Athyrma ganglio Hübner, [1831]
- Athyrma itatiaia Adams & McCabe, 2022
- Athyrma nodosa Moschler 1880 (syn. = Athyrma antica Schaus 1912)
- Athyrma orbana Moschler 1880
- Athyrma romacki Adams & McCabe, 2022
- Athyrma svensoni Adams & McCabe, 2022
- Athyrma tapichensis Adams & McCabe, 2022
- Athyrma tuberosa Felder & Rogenhofer 1874
- Athyrma urbanae Adams & McCabe, 2022
- Athyrma yasuni Adams & McCabe, 2022

Placement? [See Afrotropical records]

- Athyrma anuliplaga Walker 1865
- Athyrma discimacula Hampson 1926
- Athyrma perficiens (Walker 1858)
- Athyrma saalmulleri Mabille 1881
- Athyrma triangulifera Draudt 1950

== Former species ==
- Athyrma cordigera Walker 1869 = Celiptera levina Stoll, 1781
- Athyrma discolor Fabricius, 1794
- Athyrma eupepla Prout 1924
- Athyrma heterographa (Hampson 1912)
- Athyrma javanica Roepke 1941
- Athyrma mixosema Prout 1928
- Athyrma misera Butler 1879 = Nymbis misera Butler 1879
- Athyrma resecta (Dognin 1912) = Facies resecta (Dognin 1912)
- Athyrma novoguineana Bethune-Baker, 1906
- Athyrma paucimacula Roepke 1941
- Athyrma pratti (Bethune-Baker 1906)
- Athyrma ptocha Prout 1925
- Athyrma rufiscripta Hampson 1926
- Athyrma rhynchophora Prout 1924
- Athyrma spilota Joicey & Talbot 1917
- Athyrma subpunctata Bethune-Baker, 1906
- Athyrma subumbra Bethune-Baker, 1906
- Athyrma uloptera Prout 1925
