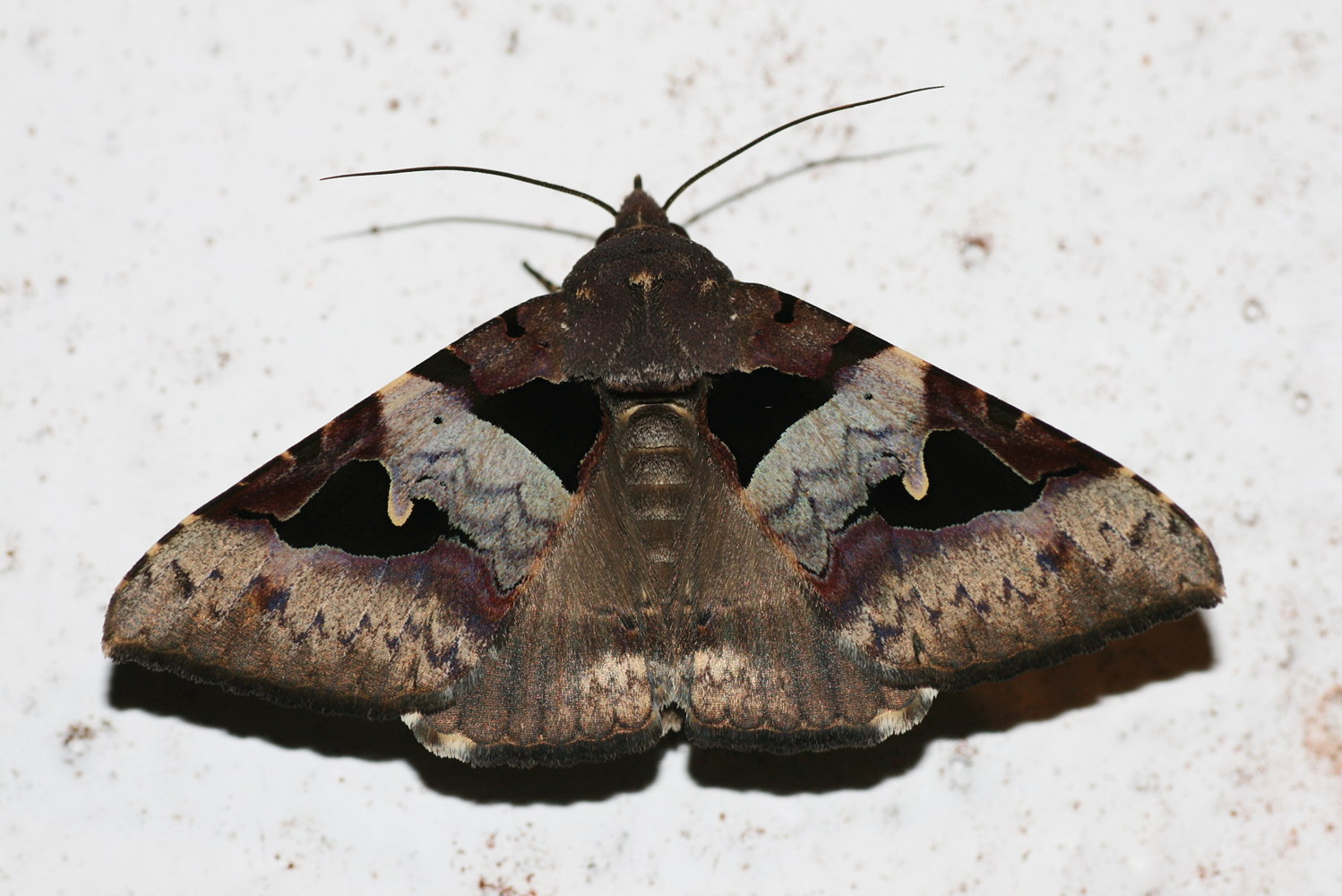

Scientific classification
- Kingdom: Animalia
- Phylum: Arthropoda
- Class: Insecta
- Order: Lepidoptera
- Superfamily: Noctuoidea
- Family: Erebidae
- Tribe: Cocytiini
- Genus: Avatha; Walker, 1858

Synonyms
- Pseudathyrma Butler 1892; Pterochaeta Holland 1900

= Avatha =

Genus of moths

Avatha is a genus of moths in the family Erebidae.

== Species ==
- Avatha bipartita (Wileman, 1915)
- Avatha bubo (Geyer, 1832)
- Avatha chinensis (Warren, 1913)
- Avatha complens (Walker, 1858)
- Avatha discolor (Fabricius, 1794)
- Avatha ethiopica (Hampson, 1913)
- Avatha eupepla (Prout, 1924)
- Avatha extranea (Berio, 1962)
- Avatha garthei (Kobes, 1989)
- Avatha gertae (Kobes, 1985)
- Avatha heterographa (Hampson, 1912)
- Avatha javanica (Roepke, 1941)
- Avatha macrostidsa (Hampson, 1913)
- Avatha minima (Swinhoe, 1918)
- Avatha mixosema (Prout, 1928)
- Avatha olivacea Prout
- Avatha noctuoides (Guenée, 1852)
- Avatha novoguineana (Bethune-Baker, 1906)
- Avatha paucimacula (Roepke, 1941)
- Avatha pratti (Bethune-Baker, 1906)
- Avatha pulcherrima Butler, 1892
- Avatha pulchrior Holloway, 2005
- Avatha rufiscripta (Hampson, 1926)
- Avatha rhynchophora Prout, 1924
- Avatha simplex (Roepke, 1951)
- Avatha spilota Joicey & Talbot, 1917
- Avatha subpunctata Bethune-Baker, 1906
- Avatha subumbra (Bethune-Baker, 1906)
- Avatha sumatrana (Kobes, 1985)
- Avatha tepescens (Walker, 1858)
- Avatha tepescoides Holloway, 2005
- Avatha uloptera (Prout, 1925)

== Former species ==
- Avatha cyanopasta (Turner, 1908) (Platyja)
- Avatha expectans (Walker, 1858)
- Avatha modesta (Roepke, 1956)
- Avatha stigmata (Moore, 1877)
