= Azeta reuteri =

Scientific classification
- Kingdom: Animalia
- Phylum: Arthropoda
- Clade: Pancrustacea
- Class: Insecta
- Order: Lepidoptera
- Superfamily: Noctuoidea
- Family: Erebidae
- Genus: Azeta
- Species: A. reuteri

Binomial name
- Azeta reuteri Saalmüller, 1881

Species of moth

Azeta reuteri is a moth of the family Erebidae first described by Max Saalmüller in 1881. It is known from Madagascar.

This moth is a metallic violet grey-brown. The forewings are more brownish, while the hindwings and abdomen are more greyish.

It has a wingspan of about 33 mm.

Saalmüller named this species after Carl Reuter who collected the specimen for the natural history museum of his hometown, Lübeck, Germany, while he was in Nosy Be, Madagascar.
