= Avatha pulchrior =

Scientific classification
- Kingdom: Animalia
- Phylum: Arthropoda
- Clade: Pancrustacea
- Class: Insecta
- Order: Lepidoptera
- Superfamily: Noctuoidea
- Family: Erebidae
- Genus: Avatha
- Species: A. pulchrior

Binomial name
- Avatha pulchrior Holloway, 2005

Species of moth

Avatha pulchrior is a species of moth of the family Erebidae. It is found on Borneo, Sumatra, Peninsular Malaysia, the Andamans, Sulawesi and in Singapore and Thailand. The habitat consists of lowland areas, including alluvial forests.

The wingspan is 22–23 mm. Adults are similar to Avatha pulcherrima, but the distal edge of the antemedial band is straighter.
