= Avatha simplex =

Scientific classification
- Domain: Eukaryota
- Kingdom: Animalia
- Phylum: Arthropoda
- Class: Insecta
- Order: Lepidoptera
- Superfamily: Noctuoidea
- Family: Erebidae
- Genus: Avatha
- Species: A. simplex

Binomial name
- Avatha simplex (Roepke, 1951)

Synonyms
- Athyrma simplex Roepke, 1951; Pseudathyrma simplex (Roepke, 1985)

Species of moth

Avatha simplex is a species of moth of the family Erebidae. It is found in Sumatra, Peninsular Malaysia and Borneo.
