= Renodes =

Scientific classification
- Kingdom: Animalia
- Phylum: Arthropoda
- Clade: Pancrustacea
- Class: Insecta
- Order: Lepidoptera
- Superfamily: Noctuoidea
- Family: Erebidae
- Subfamily: Eulepidotinae
- Genus: Renodes; Guenée, in Boisduval and Guenée, 1852

Synonyms
- Dagassa Walker, 1858; Apphadana Walker, 1865

Genus of moths

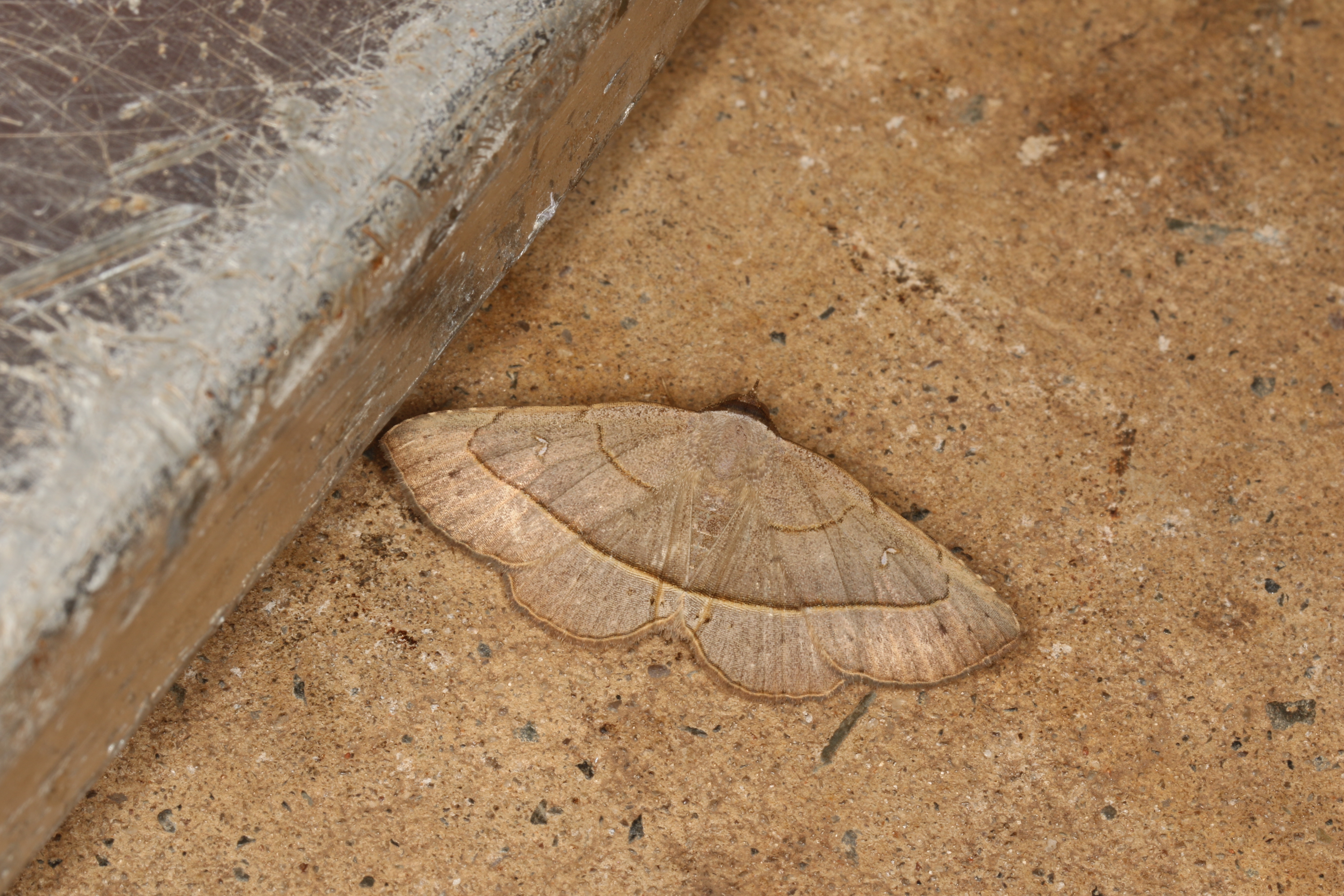
Renodes curviluna.

Renodes is a genus of moths in the family Erebidae. The genus was erected by Achille Guenée in 1852.

== Species ==
The following species are included in the genus.

- Renodes aequalis Walker, 1865
- Renodes albilimbata Hampson, 1926
- Renodes apicosa Guenée, 1852
- Renodes brevipalpis Guenée, 1852
- Renodes brunnea Cramer, 1780
- Renodes chacma Schaus, 1901
- Renodes croceiceps Walk, 1865
- Renodes curvicosta Guenée, 1852
- Renodes curviluna (H. Druce, 1890)
- Renodes diffidens Schaus, 1901
- Renodes eupithecioides Walker, 1858
- Renodes flavilimbata Hampson, 1926
- Renodes fuscula Heyden, 1891
- Renodes liturata Walker, 1865
- Renodes moha Dognin, 1897
- Renodes nephrophora Wallengren, 1860
- Renodes nigrilinea Guenée, 1852
- Renodes phaeoscia Hampson, 1926
- Renodes subfixa Walker, 1865
- Renodes vulgaris Butler, 1879
