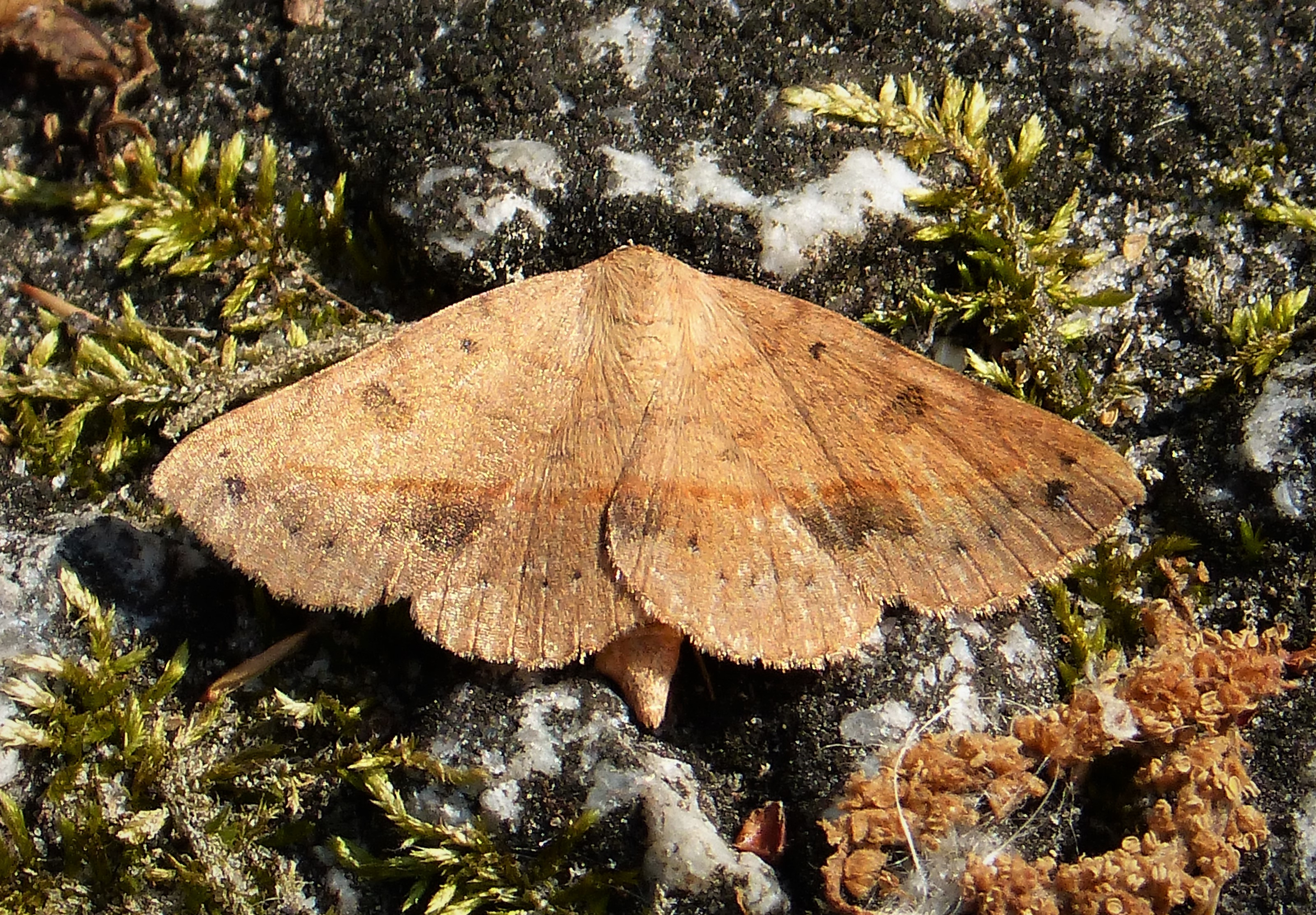

Scientific classification
- Kingdom: Animalia
- Phylum: Arthropoda
- Class: Insecta
- Order: Lepidoptera
- Superfamily: Noctuoidea
- Family: Erebidae
- Genus: Metallata
- Species: M. absumens

Binomial name
- Metallata absumens (Walker, 1862)

= Metallata absumens =

Species of moth

Metallata absumens, the variable metallata moth, is a species of moth in the family Erebidae. It is found in North America.

The MONA or Hodges number for Metallata absumens is 8573.

== Subspecies ==
These two subspecies belong to the species Metallata absumens:

- Metallata absumens absumens
- Metallata absumens contiguata Hayes, 1975
