= Epitausa prona =

Scientific classification
- Domain: Eukaryota
- Kingdom: Animalia
- Phylum: Arthropoda
- Class: Insecta
- Order: Lepidoptera
- Superfamily: Noctuoidea
- Family: Erebidae
- Genus: Epitausa
- Species: E. prona

Binomial name
- Epitausa prona (Möschler, 1880)

Species of moth

Epitausa prona is a species of moth in the family Erebidae.

The MONA or Hodges number for Epitausa prona is 8581.
