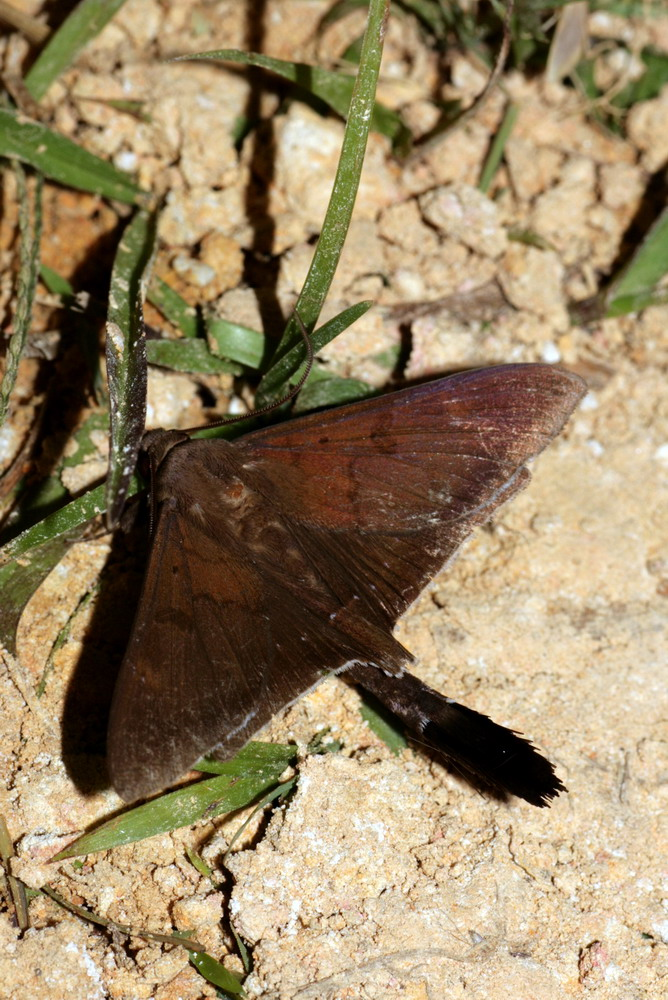
- Male from Borneo

Scientific classification
- Domain: Eukaryota
- Kingdom: Animalia
- Phylum: Arthropoda
- Class: Insecta
- Order: Lepidoptera
- Superfamily: Noctuoidea
- Family: Noctuidae
- Genus: Platyja
- Species: P. umbrina

Binomial name
- Platyja umbrina (Doubleday, 1842)

Synonyms
- Iontha umbrina Doubleday, 1842; Platyja rufiscripta Swinhoe, 1904

= Platyja umbrina =

Species of moth

Platyja umbrina is a species of noctuoid moth of the family Erebidae.

== Subspecies ==
- Platyja umbrina umbrina
- Platyja umbrina rufiscripta (Sundaland)

== Characteristics ==
There is a significant sexual dimorphism between the male and the female moths of this species. The wings are highly modified in the males. The abdomen extends well beyond the hindwings and has a conspicuous black tuft apically that arises from the valves of the genitalia. The wings are a uniform dark brown above, sometimes grade slightly paler at the margin, but rarely with the blue irroration of the typical mainland Asian race. The females are more typical of the genus in facies, with the strongly looped postmedial much more clearly delineated on the forewing, and with conspicuous, more or less straight submarginals that delimit a paler marginal zone. There is some variation, with uniform brown forms, and more variegated ones with extensive ochreous areas marginally and between the antemedial and submarginal on the forewing.

There has been some confusion in the past about the identity of the female of P. umbrina. On the basis of concordance of geography and altitude range, and a comparable sexual dimorphism in the Sulawesi representative of the group, the original suggestion by Willie Horace Thomas Tams (1924) and Joseph de Joannis (1929) that the taxon P. umbrina rufiscripta is based on the female of P. umbrina is considered correct.

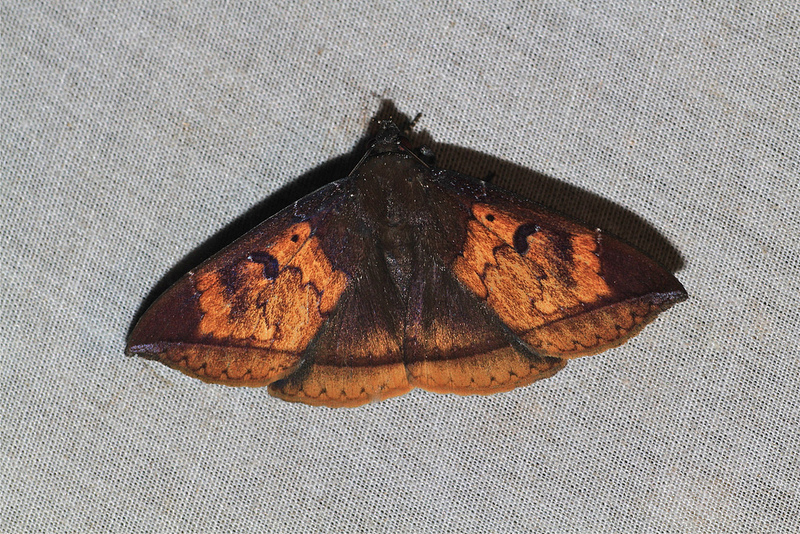
P. umbrina rufiscripta, female from Borneo

== Distribution and habitat ==
It is found in the north-eastern parts of the Himalaya, Vietnam, Thailand, Hainan and Sundaland. The species is infrequent in lowland forests.
