= Goniocarsia =

Scientific classification
- Kingdom: Animalia
- Phylum: Arthropoda
- Clade: Pancrustacea
- Class: Insecta
- Order: Lepidoptera
- Superfamily: Noctuoidea
- Family: Erebidae
- Subfamily: Eulepidotinae
- Genus: Goniocarsia; Hampson, 1926

Genus of moths

Goniocarsia is a genus of moths in the family Erebidae. The genus was erected by George Hampson in 1926.

== Species ==
- Goniocarsia electrica (Schaus, 1894) Mexico
- Goniocarsia subdentata (Schaus, 1911) Costa Rica
- Goniocarsia veluticollis (Dognin, 1914) Ecuador
