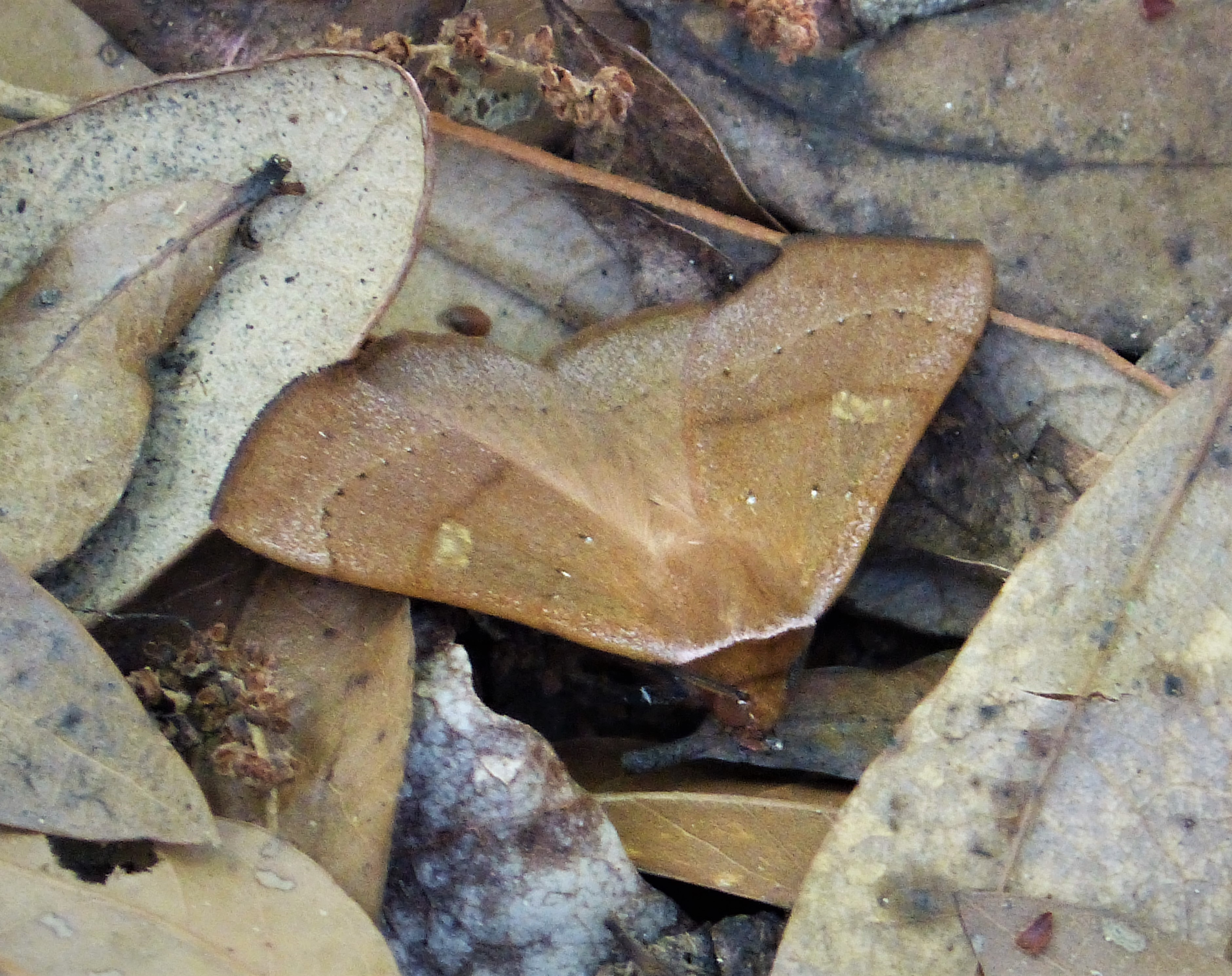
- Orange Panopoda

Scientific classification
- Kingdom: Animalia
- Phylum: Arthropoda
- Class: Insecta
- Order: Lepidoptera
- Superfamily: Noctuoidea
- Family: Erebidae
- Genus: Panopoda
- Species: P. repanda

Binomial name
- Panopoda repanda (Walker, 1858)

= Panopoda repanda =

Species of moth

Panopoda repanda, the orange panopoda, is a species of moth in the family Erebidae.

The MONA or Hodges number for Panopoda repanda is 8589.
