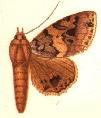

Scientific classification
- Kingdom: Animalia
- Phylum: Arthropoda
- Class: Insecta
- Order: Lepidoptera
- Superfamily: Noctuoidea
- Family: Erebidae
- Genus: Avatha
- Species: A. complens

Binomial name
- Avatha complens (Walker, 1858)

Synonyms
- Hypaetra complens Walker, 1858; Cropia glaucofascia Walker, 1858; Cropia onerata Walker, [1863]; Hypaetra ruinosa Swinhoe, 1905; Avatha dohertyi (Holland, 1900); Pterochaeta dohertyi Holland, 1900; Hypaetra stigmata Moore, 1877; Avatha tripunctata (Pagenstecher, 1888); Athyma tripunctata Pagenstecher, 1888

= Avatha complens =

Species of moth

Avatha complens is a species of moth of the family Erebidae. It is found from the north-eastern Himalayas, the Andamans and Sundaland to the Solomon Islands. The habitat consists of dry, sandy heath forests and lower montane forests.
