= Avatha ethiopica =

Scientific classification
- Kingdom: Animalia
- Phylum: Arthropoda
- Clade: Pancrustacea
- Class: Insecta
- Order: Lepidoptera
- Superfamily: Noctuoidea
- Family: Erebidae
- Genus: Avatha
- Species: A. ethiopica

Binomial name
- Avatha ethiopica (Hampson, 1913)

Synonyms
- Hypaetra ethiopica Hampson, 1913

Species of moth

Avatha ethiopica is a species of moth of the family Erebidae. It is found in the Democratic Republic of the Congo (East Kasai), Nigeria and Uganda.
