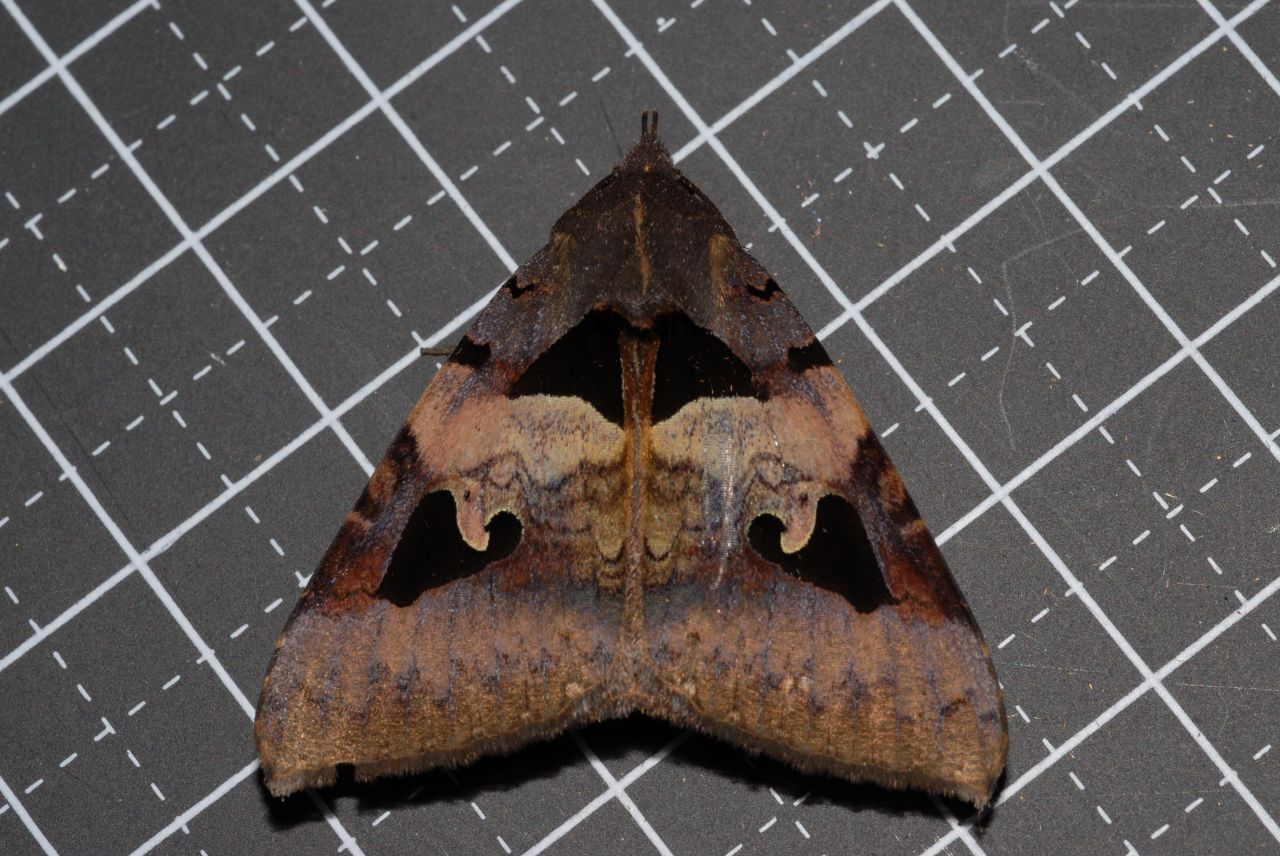

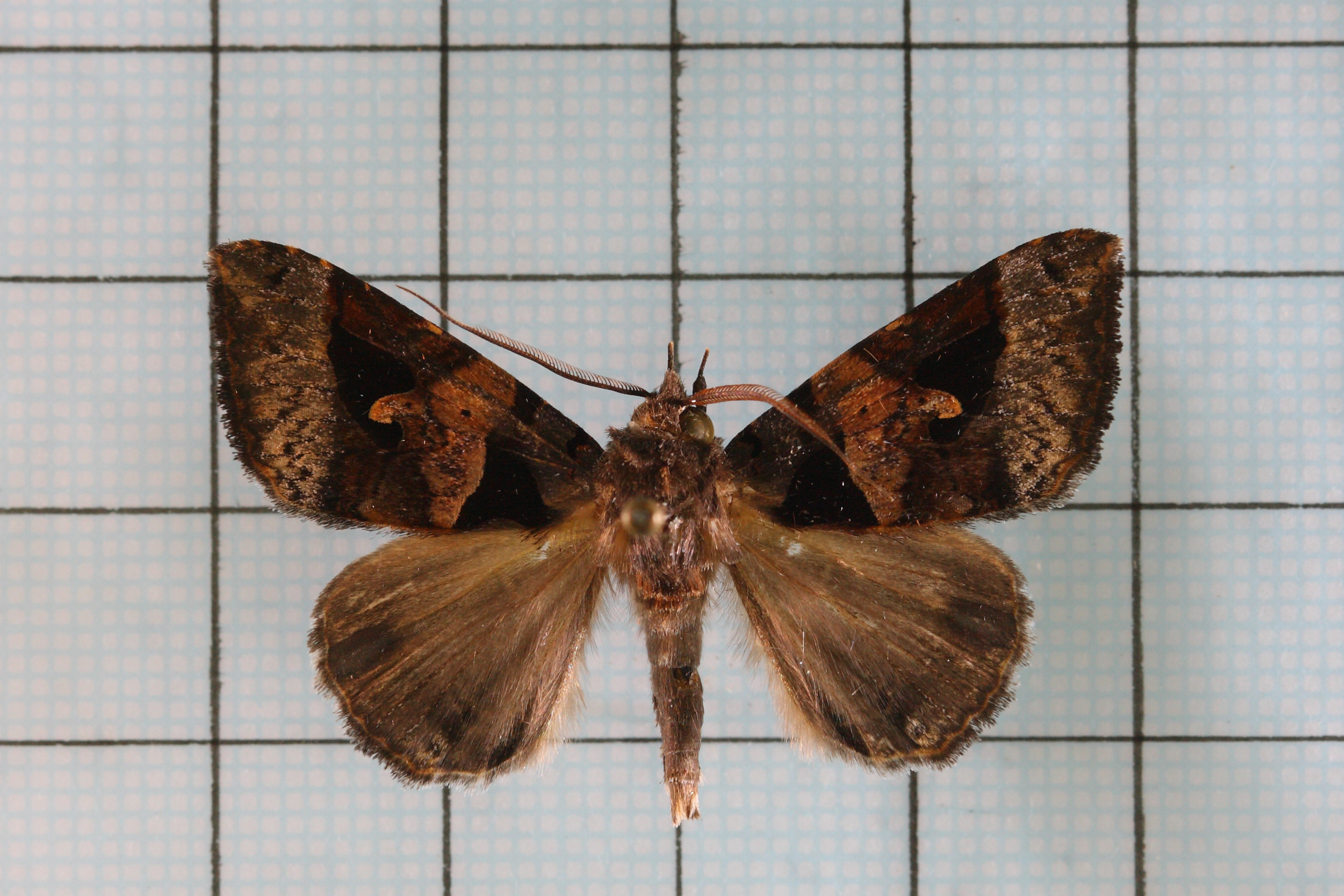

Scientific classification
- Domain: Eukaryota
- Kingdom: Animalia
- Phylum: Arthropoda
- Class: Insecta
- Order: Lepidoptera
- Superfamily: Noctuoidea
- Family: Erebidae
- Genus: Avatha
- Species: A. chinensis

Binomial name
- Avatha chinensis (Warren, 1913)

Synonyms
- Hypaetra chinensis Warren, 1913

= Avatha chinensis =

Species of moth

Avatha chinensis is a moth of the family Erebidae first described by William Warren in 1913. It is found in China and Taiwan.
