= Massala obvertens =

Scientific classification
- Kingdom: Animalia
- Phylum: Arthropoda
- Class: Insecta
- Order: Lepidoptera
- Superfamily: Noctuoidea
- Family: Erebidae
- Genus: Massala
- Species: M. obvertens

Binomial name
- Massala obvertens (Walker, 1858)

Species of moth

Massala obvertens, the tropical massala moth, is a species of moth in the family Erebidae. It is found in North America.

The MONA or Hodges number for Massala obvertens is 8586.
