= Epitausa coppryi =

Scientific classification
- Kingdom: Animalia
- Phylum: Arthropoda
- Class: Insecta
- Order: Lepidoptera
- Superfamily: Noctuoidea
- Family: Erebidae
- Genus: Epitausa
- Species: E. coppryi

Binomial name
- Epitausa coppryi (Guenée, 1852)

Species of moth

Epitausa coppryi is a species of moth in the family Erebidae. It is found in North America.

The MONA or Hodges number for Epitausa coppryi is 8581.1.
