= Avatha macrostidsa =

Scientific classification
- Kingdom: Animalia
- Phylum: Arthropoda
- Class: Insecta
- Order: Lepidoptera
- Superfamily: Noctuoidea
- Family: Erebidae
- Genus: Avatha
- Species: A. macrostidsa

Binomial name
- Avatha macrostidsa (Hampson, 1913)

Synonyms
- Hypaetra macrostidsa Hampson, 1913

Species of moth

Avatha macrostidsa is a species of moth of the family Erebidae. It is found on New Guinea.
