= Panopoda rigida =

Scientific classification
- Domain: Eukaryota
- Kingdom: Animalia
- Phylum: Arthropoda
- Class: Insecta
- Order: Lepidoptera
- Superfamily: Noctuoidea
- Family: Erebidae
- Genus: Panopoda
- Species: P. rigida

Binomial name
- Panopoda rigida (Smith, 1903)

Species of moth

Panopoda rigida is a species of moth in the family Erebidae.

The MONA or Hodges number for Panopoda rigida is 8590.
