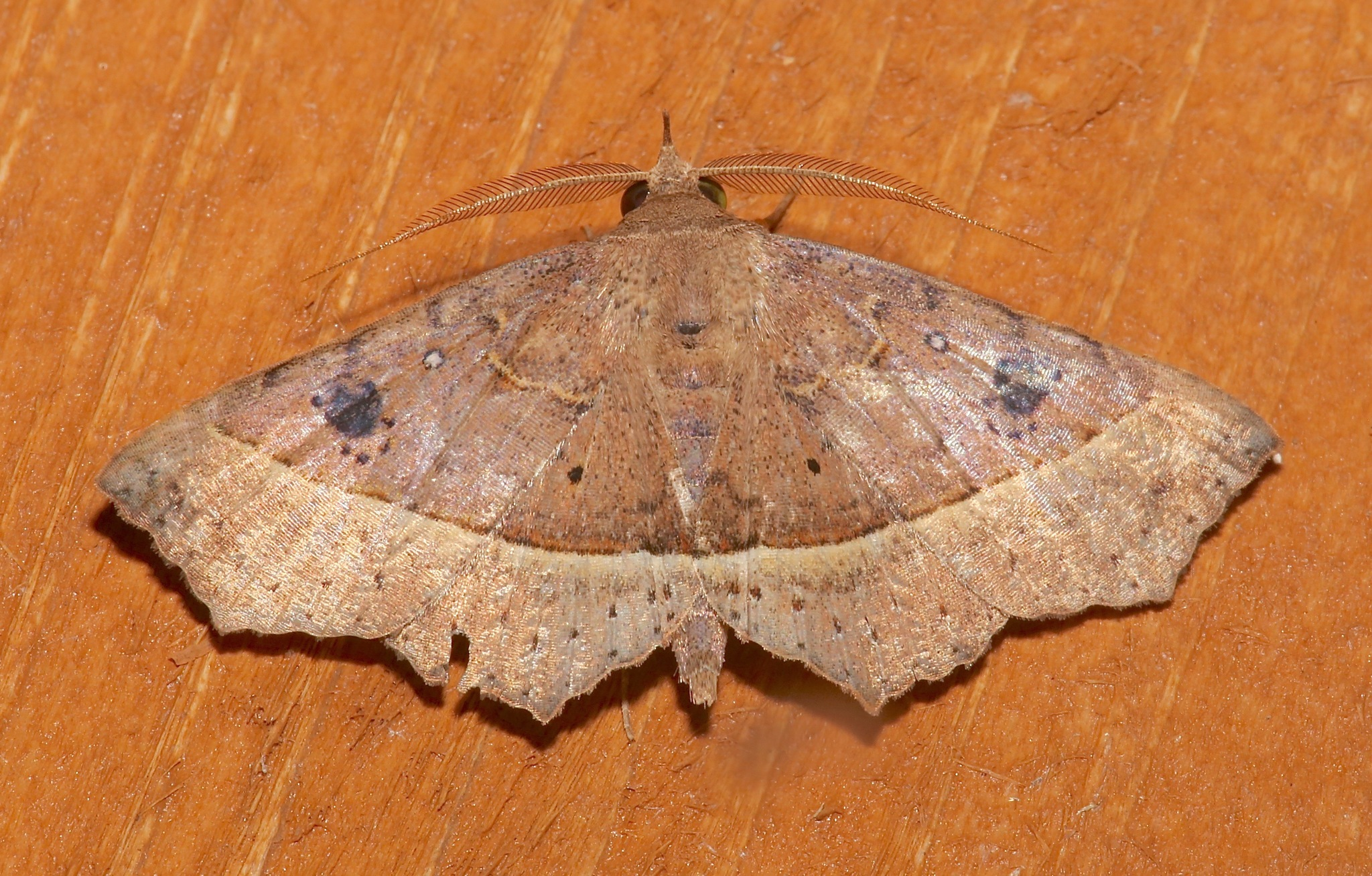

Scientific classification
- Kingdom: Animalia
- Phylum: Arthropoda
- Clade: Pancrustacea
- Class: Insecta
- Order: Lepidoptera
- Superfamily: Noctuoidea
- Family: Erebidae
- Genus: Ephyrodes
- Species: E. cacata

Binomial name
- Ephyrodes cacata Guenée, 1852

= Ephyrodes cacata =

Species of moth

Ephyrodes cacata is a species of moth in the family Erebidae. It is found in North America.
