= Metallata =

Scientific classification
- Kingdom: Animalia
- Phylum: Arthropoda
- Clade: Pancrustacea
- Class: Insecta
- Order: Lepidoptera
- Superfamily: Noctuoidea
- Family: Erebidae
- Subfamily: Eulepidotinae
- Genus: Metallata; Möschler, 1890

Synonyms
- Saserna Druce, 1891; Euthermesia Butler, 1896

Genus of moths

Metallata is a genus of moths in the family Erebidae. The genus was erected by Heinrich Benno Möschler in 1890.

== Species ==
- Metallata absumens (Walker, 1862) – variable metallata moth – eastern US to Brazil, Antilles, Venezuela, Galápagos Islands
- Metallata antias (Druce, 1891) Panama
- Metallata anyte (Druce, 1891) Panama
- Metallata arbuscula (Druce, 1891) Panama
- Metallata blandita (Schaus, 1912) Costa Rica
- Metallata distincta (Schaus, 1901) Brazil (Paraná)
- Metallata glycera (Schaus, 1914) French Guiana
- Metallata grynia (Dognin, 1912) Colombia, Bolivia
- Metallata irrorata (Schaus, 1921) Costa Rica
- Metallata moniliaris (Guenée, 1852)
