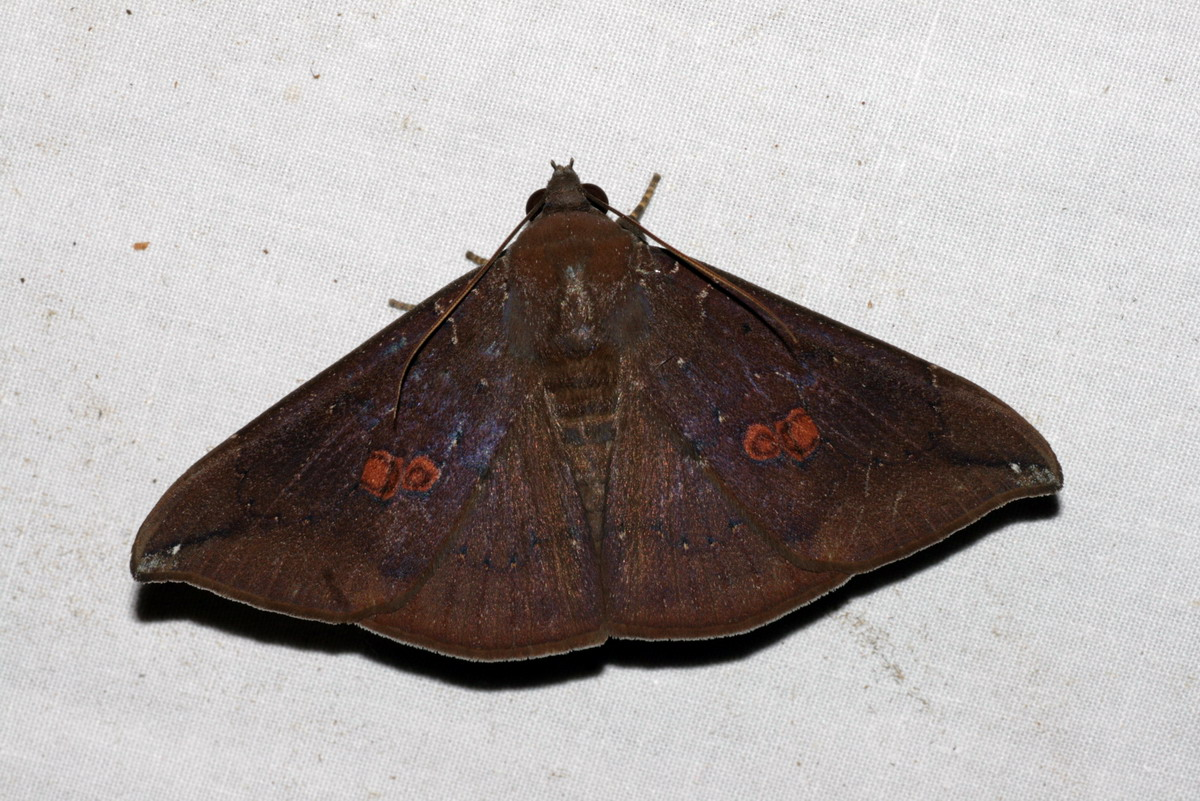

Scientific classification
- Kingdom: Animalia
- Phylum: Arthropoda
- Clade: Pancrustacea
- Class: Insecta
- Order: Lepidoptera
- Superfamily: Noctuoidea
- Family: Noctuidae
- Genus: Platyja
- Species: P. umminia

Binomial name
- Platyja umminia (Cramer, [1780])

Synonyms
- Phalaena umminia Cramer, [1780]; Sympis subunita Guenée, 1852; Cotuza drepanoides Walker, 1858; Ginaea removens Walker, 1858; Ophisma trajecta Walker, 1869; Hulodes falcata Felder & Rogenhofer, 1874

= Platyja umminia =

Species of moth

Platyja umminia is a species of moth in the family Noctuidae first described by Pieter Cramer in 1780. It is found from the Indo-Australian tropics of China, Japan, India, Sri Lanka, Myanmar to New Guinea and Queensland. It is also present on Guam. Adults have been recorded piercing fruit in Thailand and Guam.

== Description ==
Its wingspan is about 48–60 mm. Male has bipectinate antennae with short branches. Mid and hindleg with tufts of very long hair from the femur-tibial joint. Body olivaceous red-brown. Forewings with a few grey specks. An antemedial obliquely waved dark line present. Orbicular small and dark. Reniform with dark outline. There is a postmedial crenulate line, highly excurved beyond the cell and then bent inwards to below middle of cell above two dark-edged marks, which in the female are filled in with ochreous, chestnut or white and with some chestnut rings or spots. A dark streak from apex, with some grey below it. Hindwings with crenulate postmedial line and traces of a sub-marginal line. Cilia tipped with white on both wings. Ventral sides with lines on discocellulars and a crenulate postmedial line with a white specks series on it.

Adults and caterpillars are known to feed on soursop and other Annona species.
