= Avatha extranea =

Scientific classification
- Domain: Eukaryota
- Kingdom: Animalia
- Phylum: Arthropoda
- Class: Insecta
- Order: Lepidoptera
- Superfamily: Noctuoidea
- Family: Erebidae
- Genus: Avatha
- Species: A. extranea

Binomial name
- Avatha extranea (Berio, 1962)

Synonyms
- Hypaetra extranea Berio, 1962

Species of moth

Avatha extranea is a species of moth of the family Erebidae. It is found on the Seychelles, where it has been recorded from Mahé and Silhouette.
