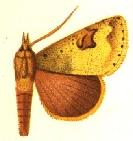
- Herminocala atomosa

Scientific classification
- Kingdom: Animalia
- Phylum: Arthropoda
- Clade: Pancrustacea
- Class: Insecta
- Order: Lepidoptera
- Superfamily: Noctuoidea
- Family: Erebidae
- Subfamily: Eulepidotinae
- Genus: Herminiocala; Hampson, 1913

Synonyms
- Herminocala

= Herminiocala =

Genus of moths

Herminiocala is a genus of moths in the family Erebidae.

== Species ==
- Herminiocala atomosa (Schaus, 1911)
- Herminiocala daona (Druce, 1894)
- Herminiocala mimica Köhler, 1979
- Herminiocala pallidoides Poole, 1989 (syn: Herminiocala pallida (Schaus, 1911))
- Herminiocala sabata Druce, 1894
- Herminiocala stigmaphiles (Dyar, 1914)
