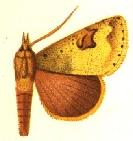

Scientific classification
- Kingdom: Animalia
- Phylum: Arthropoda
- Clade: Pancrustacea
- Class: Insecta
- Order: Lepidoptera
- Superfamily: Noctuoidea
- Family: Erebidae
- Genus: Herminiocala
- Species: H. atomosa

Binomial name
- Herminiocala atomosa (Schaus, 1911)

Synonyms
- Rhosologia atomosa Schaus, 1911; Herminocala atomosa

= Herminiocala atomosa =

Species of moth

Herminiocala atomosa is a moth of the family Noctuidae first described by William Schaus in 1911. It is found in Costa Rica.
