= Avatha olivacea =

Scientific classification
- Kingdom: Animalia
- Phylum: Arthropoda
- Clade: Pancrustacea
- Class: Insecta
- Order: Lepidoptera
- Superfamily: Noctuoidea
- Family: Erebidae
- Genus: Avatha
- Species: A. olivacea

Binomial name
- Avatha olivacea (Prout, 1922)

Synonyms
- Athyrma perficiens olivacea Prout, 1922

Species of moth

Avatha olivacea is a species of moth of the family Erebidae. It is found on Seram.
