= Avatha garthei =

Scientific classification
- Domain: Eukaryota
- Kingdom: Animalia
- Phylum: Arthropoda
- Class: Insecta
- Order: Lepidoptera
- Superfamily: Noctuoidea
- Family: Erebidae
- Genus: Avatha
- Species: A. garthei

Binomial name
- Avatha garthei (Kobes, 1989)

Synonyms
- Pseudathyrma garthei Kobes, 1989

Species of moth

Avatha garthei is a species of moth of the family Erebidae. It is found on Nias, Sumatra, Borneo and in north-eastern India.
