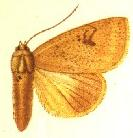

Scientific classification
- Kingdom: Animalia
- Phylum: Arthropoda
- Clade: Pancrustacea
- Class: Insecta
- Order: Lepidoptera
- Superfamily: Noctuoidea
- Family: Erebidae
- Genus: Herminiocala
- Species: H. pallidoides

Binomial name
- Herminiocala pallidoides Poole, 1989

Synonyms
- Herminiocala pallida (Schaus, 1911); Rhosologia pallida Schaus, 1911; Herminocala pallidoides; Herminocala pallida

= Herminiocala pallidoides =

Species of moth

Herminiocala pallidoides is a moth of the family Noctuidae first described by Robert W. Poole in 1989. It is found in Costa Rica.
