= Avatha noctuoides =

Scientific classification
- Kingdom: Animalia
- Phylum: Arthropoda
- Class: Insecta
- Order: Lepidoptera
- Superfamily: Noctuoidea
- Family: Erebidae
- Genus: Avatha
- Species: A. noctuoides

Binomial name
- Avatha noctuoides (Guenée, 1852)

Synonyms
- Hypaetra noctuoides Guenée, 1852; Athyrma ptocha Prout, 1925

Species of moth

Avatha noctuoides is a species of moth of the family Erebidae. It is found in Java, Singapore, Borneo, Myanmar, the Andamans, India and China (Hainan).

Adults are similar to Avatha discolor.

The larvae feed on Allophylus, Schleichera and Lepisanthes species. Young larvae rest along the undersides of the leaves of the host plant.
