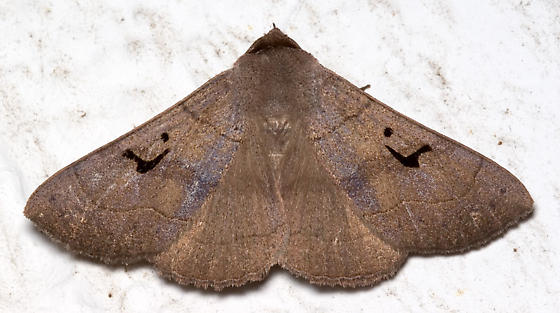

Scientific classification
- Kingdom: Animalia
- Phylum: Arthropoda
- Class: Insecta
- Order: Lepidoptera
- Superfamily: Noctuoidea
- Family: Erebidae
- Genus: Panopoda
- Species: P. carneicosta

Binomial name
- Panopoda carneicosta Guenée, 1852

Synonyms
- Panopoda scissa (Walker, 1865); Panopoda combinata (Walker, 1857)

= Panopoda carneicosta =

Species of moth

Panopoda carneicosta, the brown panopoda, is a moth of the family Erebidae. The species was first described by Achille Guenée in 1852. It is found in North America from Ontario, Quebec and Maine, south to Florida, west to Texas, north to Wisconsin and Minnesota.

The wingspan is 38–46 mm. Reported flight periods vary. Charles V. Covell Jr. gives a flight period of May to August, and Ohio State University gives a flight period of April to September. They are most seen in June and July though. There is one generation per year in the north, possibly two in the south.

The larvae feed on the leaves of basswood, oak, hickory and willow.
