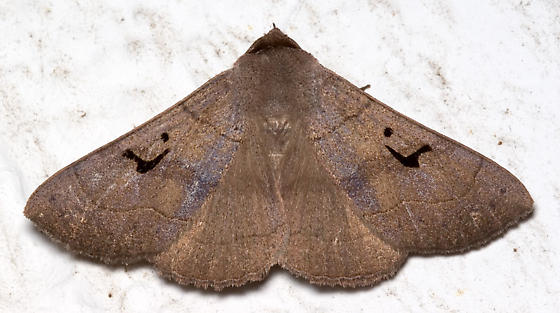
- Panopoda carneicosta

Scientific classification
- Kingdom: Animalia
- Phylum: Arthropoda
- Clade: Pancrustacea
- Class: Insecta
- Order: Lepidoptera
- Superfamily: Noctuoidea
- Family: Erebidae
- Subfamily: Eulepidotinae
- Genus: Panopoda; Guenée in Boisduval & Guenée, 1852

Synonyms
- Siavana Walker, 1857; Harveya Grote, 1873

= Panopoda =

Genus of moths

Panopoda is a genus of moths in the family Erebidae. The genus was erected by Achille Guenée in 1852.

== Species ==
- Panopoda carneicosta Guenée, 1852 – brown panopoda moth
- Panopoda repanda Walker, 1858 – orange panopoda moth
- Panopoda rigida J. B. Smith, 1903
- Panopoda rufimargo Hübner, 1818 – red-lined panopoda moth
