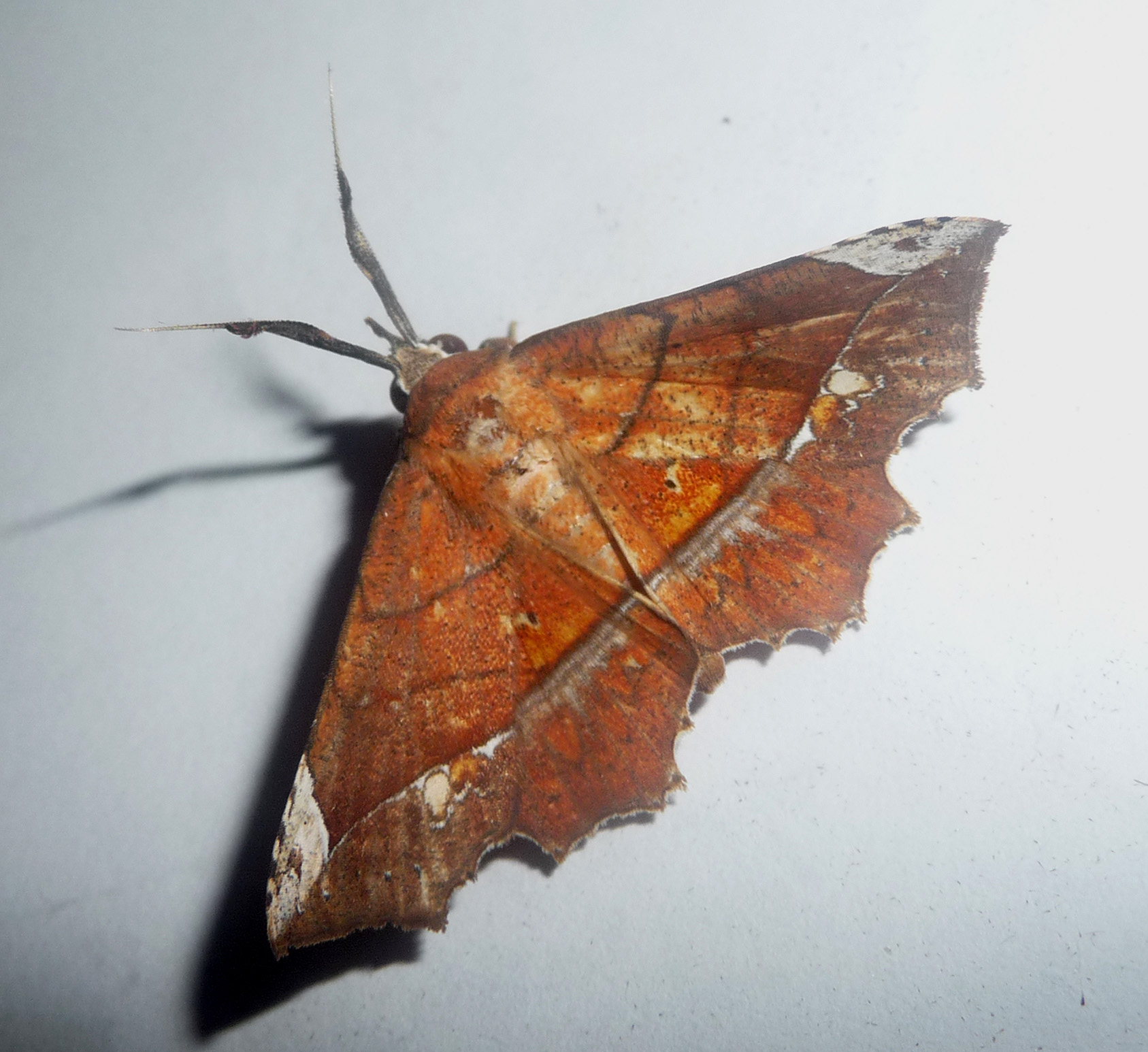
- Syllectra erycata

Scientific classification
- Kingdom: Animalia
- Phylum: Arthropoda
- Clade: Pancrustacea
- Class: Insecta
- Order: Lepidoptera
- Superfamily: Noctuoidea
- Family: Erebidae
- Subfamily: Eulepidotinae
- Genus: Syllectra; Hübner, [1819]

Synonyms
- Teratocera Guenee, 1852

= Syllectra =

Genus of moths

Syllectra is a genus of moths in the family Erebidae. The genus was erected by Jacob Hübner in 1819.

== Species ==
- Syllectra congemmalis Hubner, 1823
- Syllectra erycata Cramer, 1780
- Syllectra lucifer Moschler, 1890
