= Goniocarsia electrica =

Scientific classification
- Kingdom: Animalia
- Phylum: Arthropoda
- Clade: Pancrustacea
- Class: Insecta
- Order: Lepidoptera
- Superfamily: Noctuoidea
- Family: Erebidae
- Genus: Goniocarsia
- Species: G. electrica

Binomial name
- Goniocarsia electrica (Schaus, 1894)

Species of moth

Goniocarsia electrica is a species of moth in the family Erebidae. It is found in North America.

The MONA or Hodges number for Goniocarsia electrica is 8580.
