= Athyrma adjutrix =

Scientific classification
- Kingdom: Animalia
- Phylum: Arthropoda
- Class: Insecta
- Order: Lepidoptera
- Superfamily: Noctuoidea
- Family: Erebidae
- Genus: Athyrma
- Species: A. adjutrix

Binomial name
- Athyrma adjutrix (Cramer, 1780)

Species of moth

Athyrma adjutrix is a species of moth in the family Erebidae. It is found in North America and South America.

The MONA or Hodges number for Athyrma adjutrix is 8583.
