= Obrima =

Scientific classification
- Kingdom: Animalia
- Phylum: Arthropoda
- Clade: Pancrustacea
- Class: Insecta
- Order: Lepidoptera
- Superfamily: Noctuoidea
- Family: Erebidae
- Subfamily: Eulepidotinae
- Genus: Obrima; Walker, 1856

Genus of moths

Obrima is a genus of moths in the family Erebidae. The genus was erected by Francis Walker in 1856.

== Species ==
- Obrima pyraloides Walker, 1856
- Obrima rinconada Schaus, 1894
