= Avatha tepescoides =

Scientific classification
- Kingdom: Animalia
- Phylum: Arthropoda
- Clade: Pancrustacea
- Class: Insecta
- Order: Lepidoptera
- Superfamily: Noctuoidea
- Family: Erebidae
- Genus: Avatha
- Species: A. tepescoides

Binomial name
- Avatha tepescoides Holloway, 2005

Species of moth

Avatha tepescoides is a species of moth of the family Erebidae. It is found on Borneo.
