= Obrima rinconada =

Scientific classification
- Domain: Eukaryota
- Kingdom: Animalia
- Phylum: Arthropoda
- Class: Insecta
- Order: Lepidoptera
- Superfamily: Noctuoidea
- Family: Erebidae
- Genus: Obrima
- Species: O. rinconada

Binomial name
- Obrima rinconada Schaus, 1894

Species of moth

Obrima rinconada is a species of moth in the family Erebidae. It is found in North America.

The MONA or Hodges number for Obrima rinconada is 8565.

== Subspecies ==
These two subspecies belong to the species Obrima rinconada:

- Obrima rinconada pimaensis Barnes & Benjamin, 1925
- Obrima rinconada rinconada
