= Massala (moth) =

Scientific classification
- Kingdom: Animalia
- Phylum: Arthropoda
- Clade: Pancrustacea
- Class: Insecta
- Order: Lepidoptera
- Superfamily: Noctuoidea
- Family: Erebidae
- Subfamily: Eulepidotinae
- Genus: Massala; Walker, 1865

Synonyms
- Erymella Walker, 1867

Genus of moths

Massala is a genus of moths in the family Erebidae. The genus was erected by Francis Walker in 1865.

== Species ==
- Massala abdara (Herrich-Schäffer, [1869]) Venezuela
- Massala asema Hampson, 1926 Antilles
- Massala carthia Schaus, 1904 southeast Brazil
- Massala dimidiata Walker, 1865 Jamaica
- Massala dorsilinea (Dyar, 1909) Guyana
- Massala ernestina Dognin, 1912 Bolivia
- Massala hieroglyphica (Walker, 1867) Colombia
- Massala maculifera (Maassen, 1890) Peru
- Massala marmona Schaus, 1904 Brazil (São Paulo)
- Massala obvertens (Walker, 1858) Puerto Rico, Dominican Republic, Guatemala
