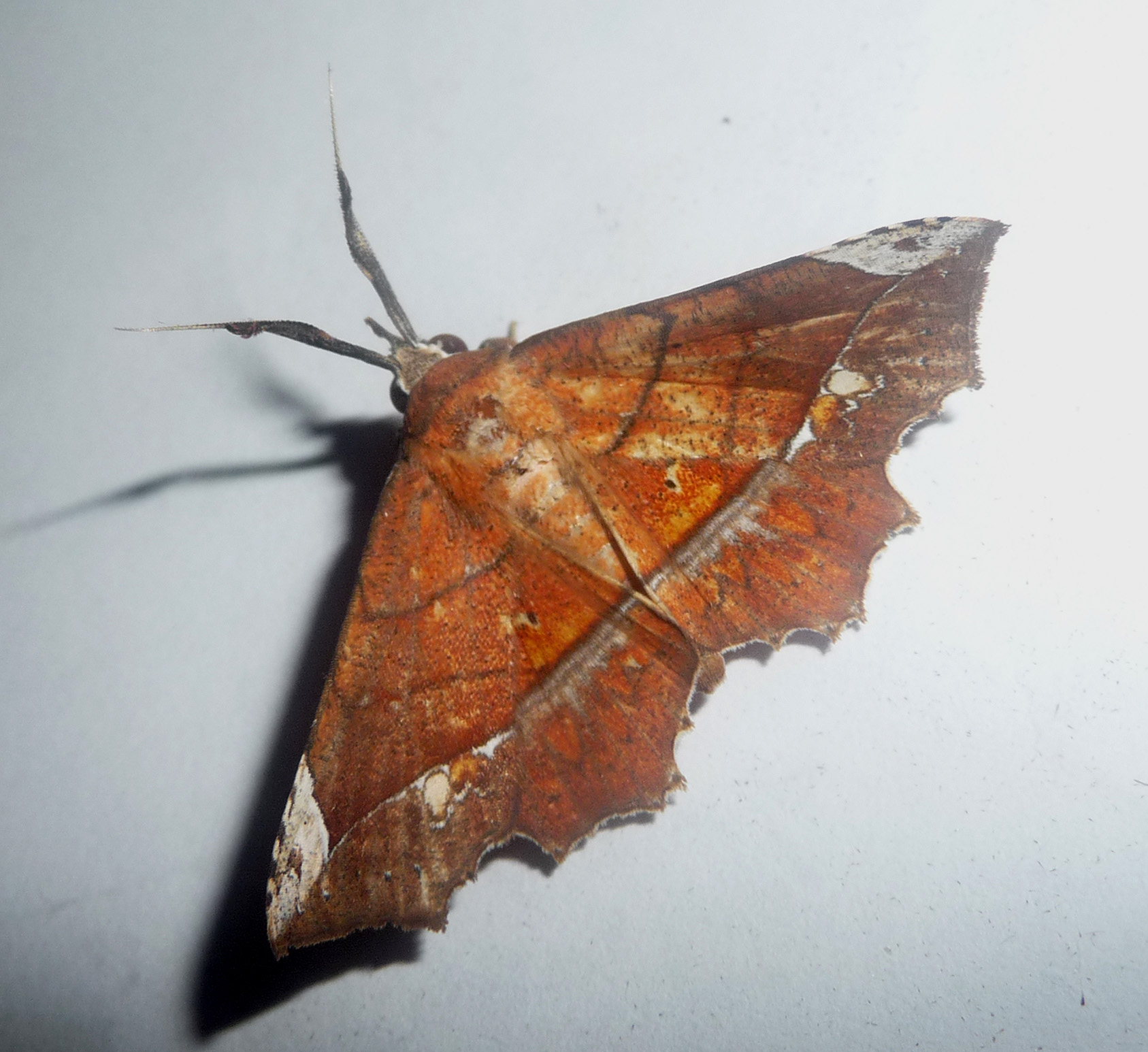

Scientific classification
- Kingdom: Animalia
- Phylum: Arthropoda
- Clade: Pancrustacea
- Class: Insecta
- Order: Lepidoptera
- Superfamily: Noctuoidea
- Family: Erebidae
- Genus: Syllectra
- Species: S. erycata

Binomial name
- Syllectra erycata (Cramer, 1780)

Synonyms
- Phalaena erycata Cramer, 1780; Syllectra mirandalis Hubner, 1819

= Syllectra erycata =

Species of moth

Syllectra erycata is a moth in the family Erebidae first described by Pieter Cramer in 1780. It is found from Florida, Texas and the Antilles (Jamaica, Guadeloupe, Martinique, Saint Kitts, Hispaniola, Cuba, Puerto Rico, Saint Lucia, Grenada) to Brazil, Peru, Suriname and Bolivia.

The wingspan is about 35 mm.
