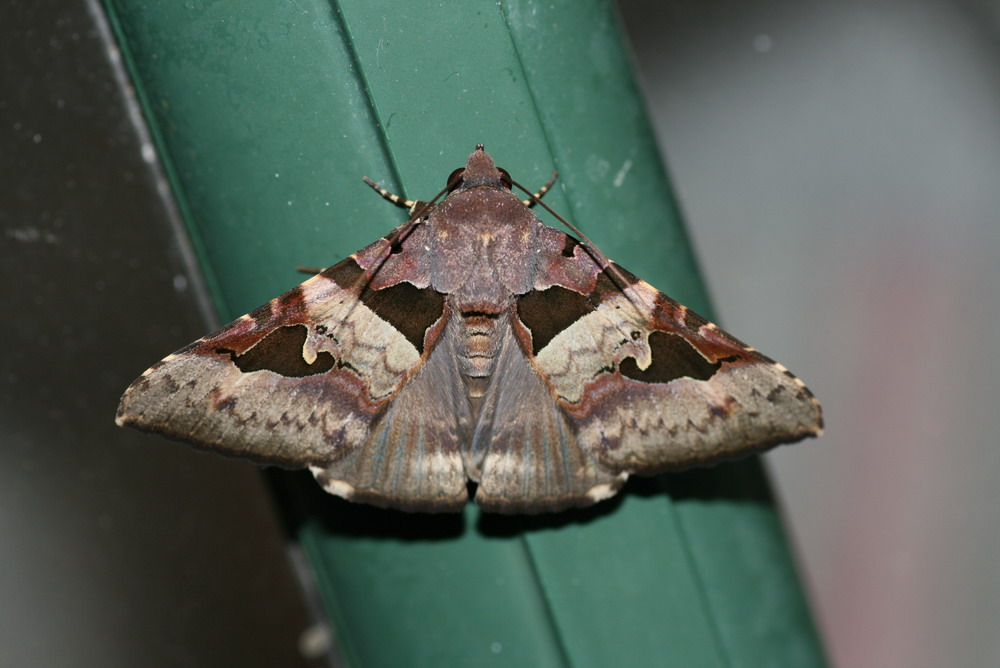

Scientific classification
- Domain: Eukaryota
- Kingdom: Animalia
- Phylum: Arthropoda
- Class: Insecta
- Order: Lepidoptera
- Superfamily: Noctuoidea
- Family: Erebidae
- Genus: Avatha
- Species: A. bubo

Binomial name
- Avatha bubo (Geyer, 1832)

Synonyms
- Athyrma bubo Geyer, 1832; Hypaetra perficiens Walker, 1858; Hypaetra condita Walker, 1858; Athyrma bubo Hübner; Holloway, 1976; Pseudathyrma bubo Hübner; Kobes, 1985

= Avatha bubo =

Species of moth

Avatha bubo is a species of moth of the family Erebidae. It is found in Sundaland, Sulawesi, Seram, throughout India, Sri Lanka and Andaman Islands.

== Description ==
Its wingspan about 56 mm. Males with non-distorted sub-costal neuration of forewings and without sexual patches on forewing and hindwing. Antennae of male minutely ciliated. Head, thorax and forewings purplish grey. Forewings with medial and outer area palest. The black lunules on the antemedial and postmedial lines extremely large and produced at their angles. The lines more distinct and dentate. Some pale specks on the costa. Hindwings with a diffused pale streak near with a medial maculate line.

Larva speckled and mottled, with 'muddy', lichen-greenish grey all over. The larvae feed on the flowers and young leaves of Nephelium species.
