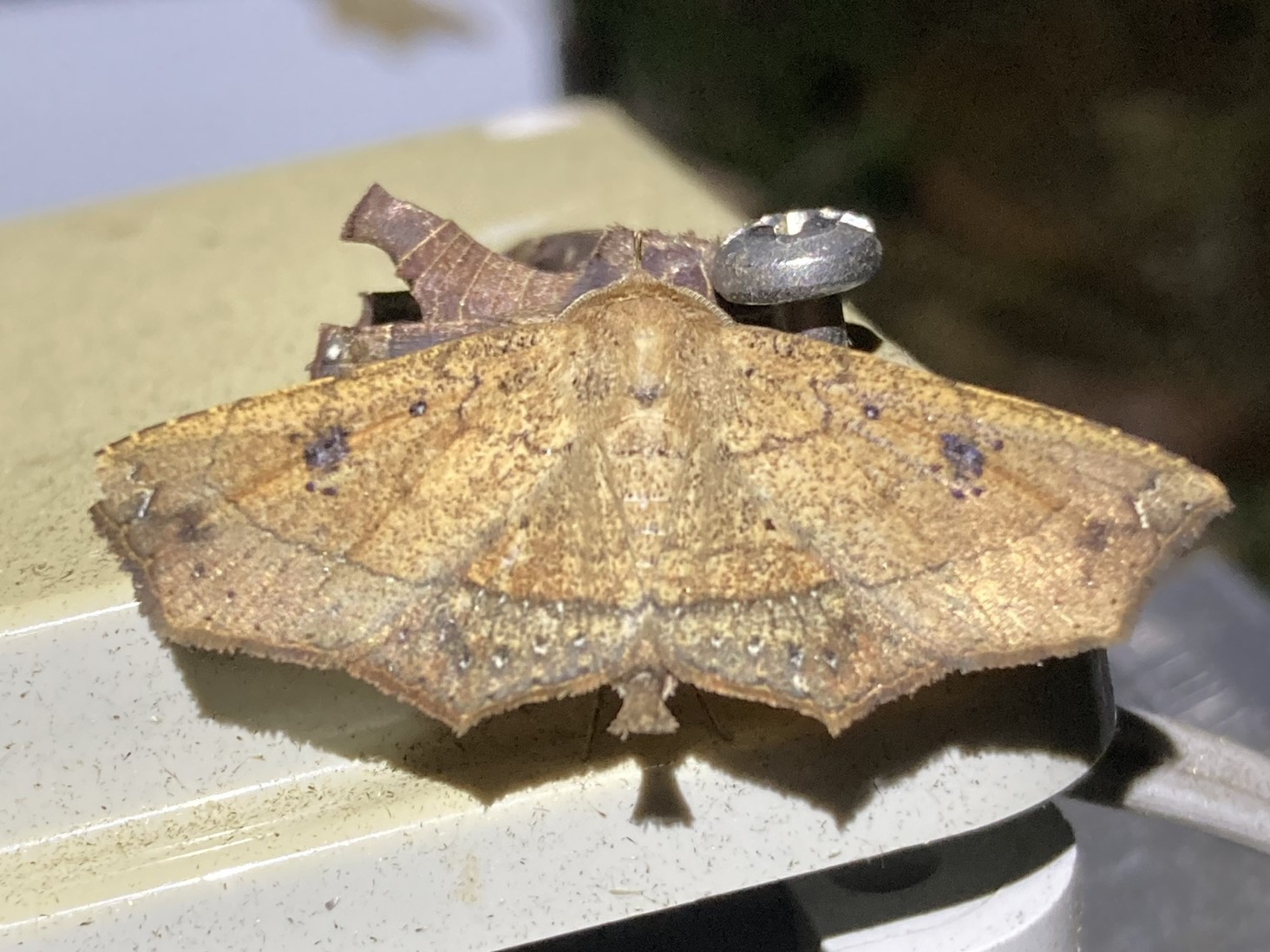

Scientific classification
- Kingdom: Animalia
- Phylum: Arthropoda
- Clade: Pancrustacea
- Class: Insecta
- Order: Lepidoptera
- Superfamily: Noctuoidea
- Family: Erebidae
- Genus: Ephyrodes
- Species: E. similis

Binomial name
- Ephyrodes similis Druce, 1890

= Ephyrodes similis =

Species of moth

Ephyrodes similis is a species of moth in the family Erebidae.
