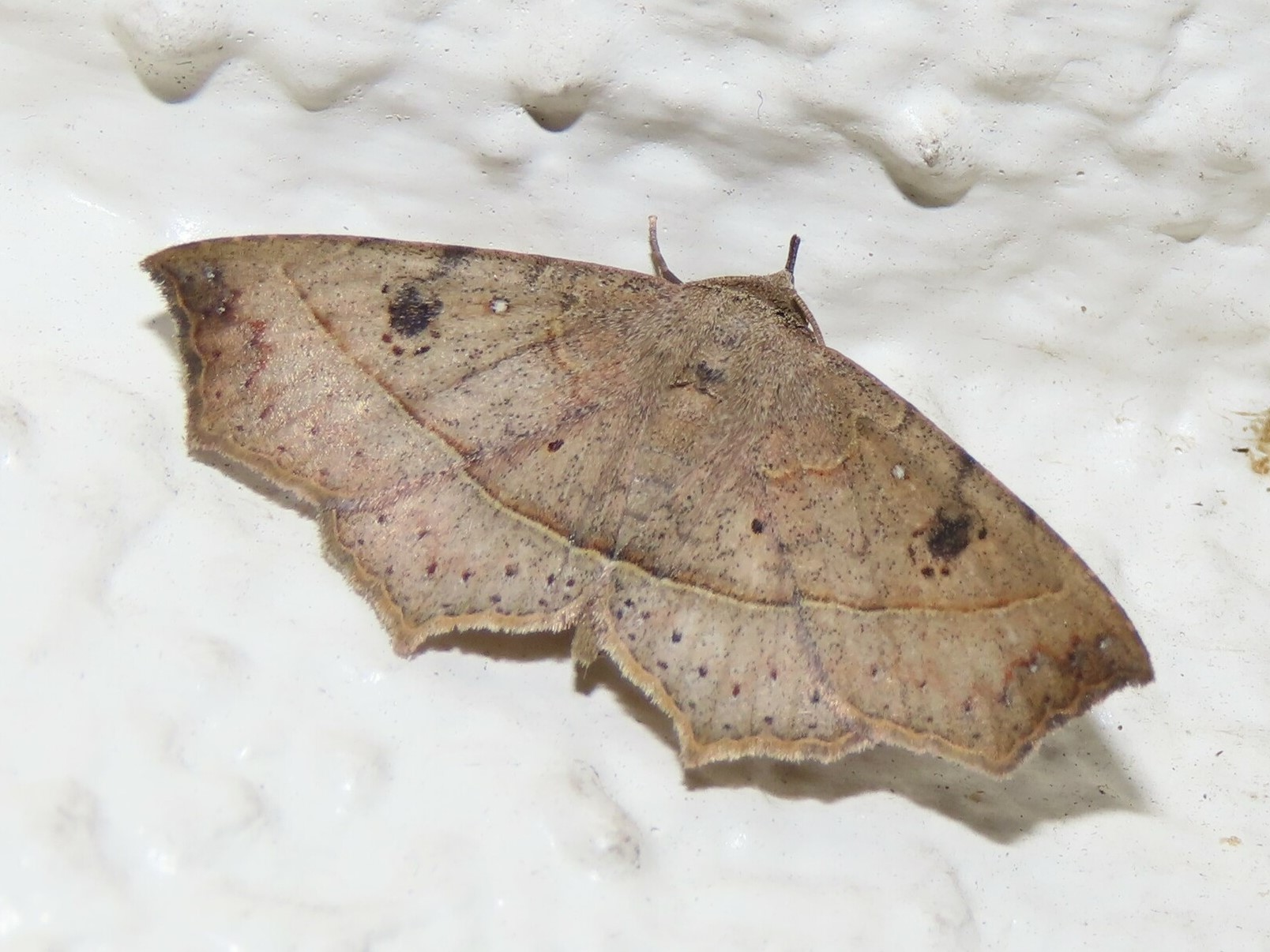
- Ephyrodes cacata

Scientific classification
- Kingdom: Animalia
- Phylum: Arthropoda
- Clade: Pancrustacea
- Class: Insecta
- Order: Lepidoptera
- Superfamily: Noctuoidea
- Family: Erebidae
- Subfamily: Eulepidotinae
- Genus: Ephyrodes; Guenée in Boisduval & Guenée, 1852

Synonyms
- Leida Walker, 1865; Liviana Walker, 1865; Maltana Walker, 1866

= Ephyrodes =

Genus of moths

Ephyrodes is a genus of moths in the family Erebidae. The genus was introduced by Achille Guenée in 1852.

== Taxonomy ==
The genus was previously classified in the family Noctuidae.

== Species ==
- Ephyrodes cacata Guenée, 1852 southern US to Colombia, Antilles, Brazil (Pará)
- Ephyrodes eviola Hampson, 1926 Peru
- Ephyrodes gorgoniopis Dognin, 1919 French Guiana
- Ephyrodes hypenoides (Guenée, 1852) French Guiana
- Ephyrodes omicron Guenée, 1852 Haiti
- Ephyrodes repandens Schaus, 1911 Costa Rica
- Ephyrodes similis Druce, 1890 Panama
