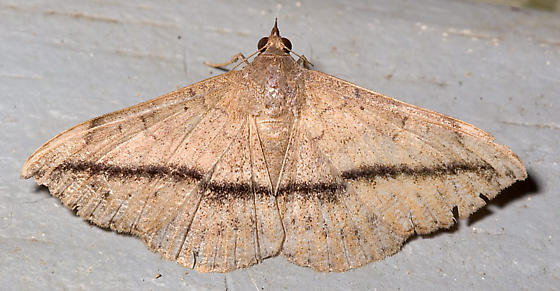
- Anticarsia_gemmatalis

Scientific classification
- Kingdom: Animalia
- Phylum: Arthropoda
- Class: Insecta
- Order: Lepidoptera
- Superfamily: Noctuoidea
- Family: Erebidae
- Subfamily: Eulepidotinae; Grote, 1895

= Eulepidotinae =

Subfamily of moths

Eulepidotinae is a subfamily of moths in the family Erebidae. Adult males in the subfamily have midtibial tufts of hairs. Adult females have the ostial opening located between the seventh and eighth abdominal sternites instead of located anteriorly on the seventh sternite.

== Taxonomy ==
Phylogenetic analysis has determined that the Eulepidotinae are closely related to the Hypocalinae, and a clade of these two subfamilies is closely related to the Calpinae. The classification of genera into tribes within the Eulepidotinae has not been resolved.

=== Genera ===
- Anticarsia
- Athyrma
- Azeta
- Epitausa
- Ephyrodes
- Eulepidotis
- Goniocarsia
- Herminiocala
- Manbuta
- Massala
- Metallata
- Obrima
- Panopoda
- Renodes
- Syllectra
