= Manbuta =

Scientific classification
- Kingdom: Animalia
- Phylum: Arthropoda
- Clade: Pancrustacea
- Class: Insecta
- Order: Lepidoptera
- Superfamily: Noctuoidea
- Family: Erebidae
- Subfamily: Eulepidotinae
- Genus: Manbuta; Walker, 1865

Synonyms
- Pagyra Schaus, 1901

Genus of moths

Manbuta is a genus of moths in the family Erebidae. The genus was erected by Francis Walker in 1865.

== Species ==
- Manbuta calgia (Schaus, 1901) Brazil (Paraná)
- Manbuta devia Walker, 1865 Brazil (Amazonas)
- Manbuta endocharagma Hampson, 1926 Peru
- Manbuta melanesia Hampson, 1926 Peru
- Manbuta nephelica Hampson, 1926 Peru
- Manbuta nephrosema Hampson, 1926 Peru
- Manbuta niphosema Hampson, 1926 Peru
- Manbuta ochrosema Hampson, 1926 Paraguay
- Manbuta ocresia (Schaus, 1914) French Guiana
- Manbuta orthogramma Hampson, 1926 Peru
- Manbuta pyraliformis (Walker, 1858) Florida, Antilles
- Manbuta rhomboidalis Hampson, 1926 Peru
