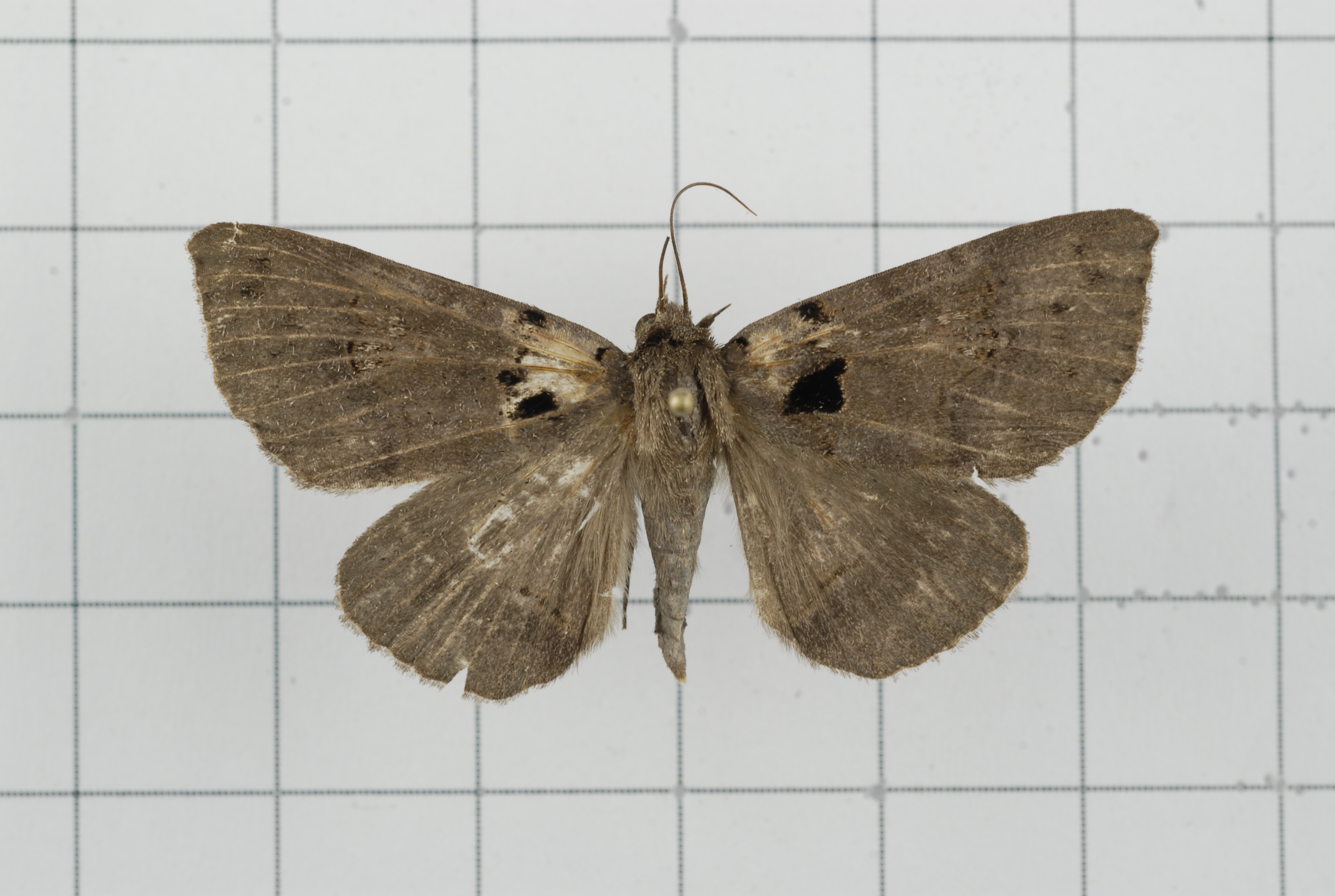
- Avatha bipartita

Scientific classification
- Domain: Eukaryota
- Kingdom: Animalia
- Phylum: Arthropoda
- Class: Insecta
- Order: Lepidoptera
- Superfamily: Noctuoidea
- Family: Erebidae
- Genus: Avatha
- Species: A. bipartite

Binomial name
- Avatha bipartite (Wileman, 1915)

Synonyms
- Hypaetra bipartita Wileman, 1915

= Avatha bipartita =

Species of moth

Avatha bipartita is a species of moth of the family Erebidae. It is found in Taiwan.
