= Epitausa =

Scientific classification
- Kingdom: Animalia
- Phylum: Arthropoda
- Clade: Pancrustacea
- Class: Insecta
- Order: Lepidoptera
- Superfamily: Noctuoidea
- Family: Erebidae
- Subfamily: Eulepidotinae
- Genus: Epitausa; Walker, [1857]

Synonyms
- Orthogramma Guenée, 1852; Archana Walker, 1865

Genus of moths

Epitausa is a genus of moths in the family Erebidae. The genus was erected by Francis Walker in 1857.

== Species ==
- Epitausa adelpha (Felder & Rogenhofer, 1874) Argentina
- Epitausa atriplaga (Walker, 1858) Brazil (Amazonas), Panama
- Epitausa coppryi (Guenée, 1852) Brazil (Amazonas), French Guiana
- Epitausa dilina (Herrich-Schäffer, [1858]) Brazil (Amazonas)
- Epitausa ferogia (Schaus, 1906) Brazil (São Paulo)
- Epitausa flagrans (Walker, 1869) Suriname
- Epitausa hermesia (Schaus, 1906) Brazil (São Paulo)
- Epitausa laetabilis Walker, [1857] Dominican Republic
- Epitausa livescens (Guenée, 1852) French Guiana
- Epitausa lurida (Butler, 1879) Brazil (Amazonas)
- Epitausa megastigma (Herrich-Schäffer, [1854]) Suriname
- Epitausa modesta (Schaus, 1914) Suriname
- Epitausa obliterans (Walker, 1858) Brazil (Amazonas)
- Epitausa octophora (Felder & Rogenhofer, 1874) Brazil (Amazonas)
- Epitausa olivescens (Schaus, 1912) French Guiana
- Epitausa pallescens (Schaus, 1901) Brazil (São Paulo)
- Epitausa patagonica (Guenée, 1852) Patagonia
- Epitausa pavescens (Butler, 1879) Brazil (Amazonas)
- Epitausa perserverans (Walker, 1858) Brazil (Amazonas, Para)
- Epitausa phanerosema (Hampson, 1926) Brazil
- Epitausa prona (Möschler, 1880) Panama, Suriname
- Epitausa rubripuncta (Guenée, 1852) Brazil (Amazonas), French Guiana
- Epitausa subinsulsa (Dognin, 1912) French Guiana
- Epitausa sublata (Dognin, 1912) Peru
- Epitausa terranea (Schaus, 1911) Costa Rica
- Epitausa venefica (Möschler, 1880) Suriname
- Epitausa violascens (Hampson, 1926) Brazil (Amazonas)
