= Avatha sumatrana =

Scientific classification
- Domain: Eukaryota
- Kingdom: Animalia
- Phylum: Arthropoda
- Class: Insecta
- Order: Lepidoptera
- Superfamily: Noctuoidea
- Family: Erebidae
- Genus: Avatha
- Species: A. sumatrana

Binomial name
- Avatha sumatrana (Kobes, 1985)

Synonyms
- Pseudathyrma sumatrana Kobes, 1985

Species of moth

Avatha sumatrana is a species of moth of the family Erebidae. It is found in Sumatra and Borneo.
