= Avatha minima =

Scientific classification
- Domain: Eukaryota
- Kingdom: Animalia
- Phylum: Arthropoda
- Class: Insecta
- Order: Lepidoptera
- Superfamily: Noctuoidea
- Family: Erebidae
- Genus: Avatha
- Species: A. minima

Binomial name
- Avatha minima (C. Swinhoe, 1918)

Synonyms
- Hypaetra minima C. Swinhoe, 1918

Species of moth

Avatha minima is a species of moth of the family Erebidae first described by Charles Swinhoe in 1918. It is found in the Philippines.
