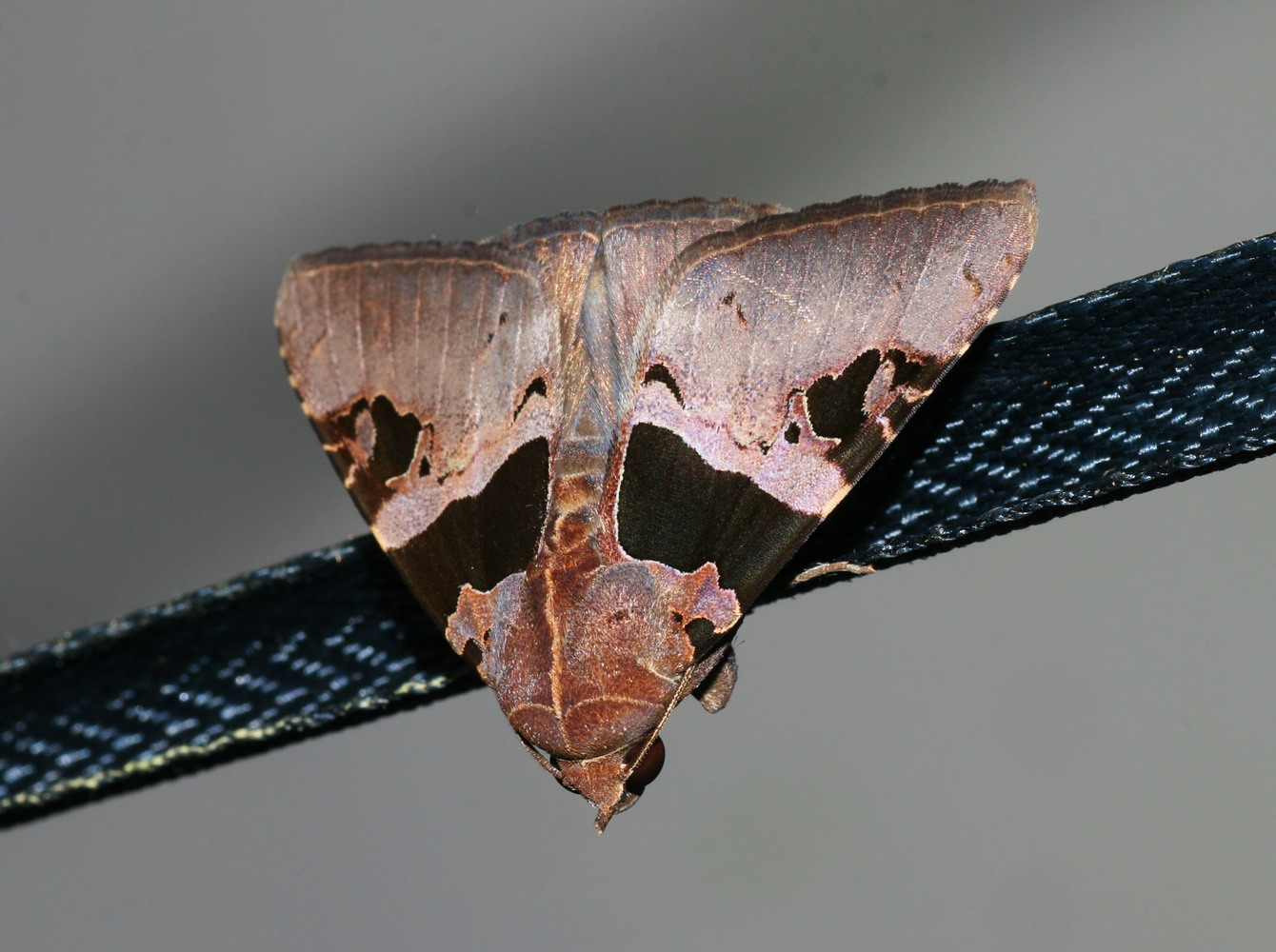

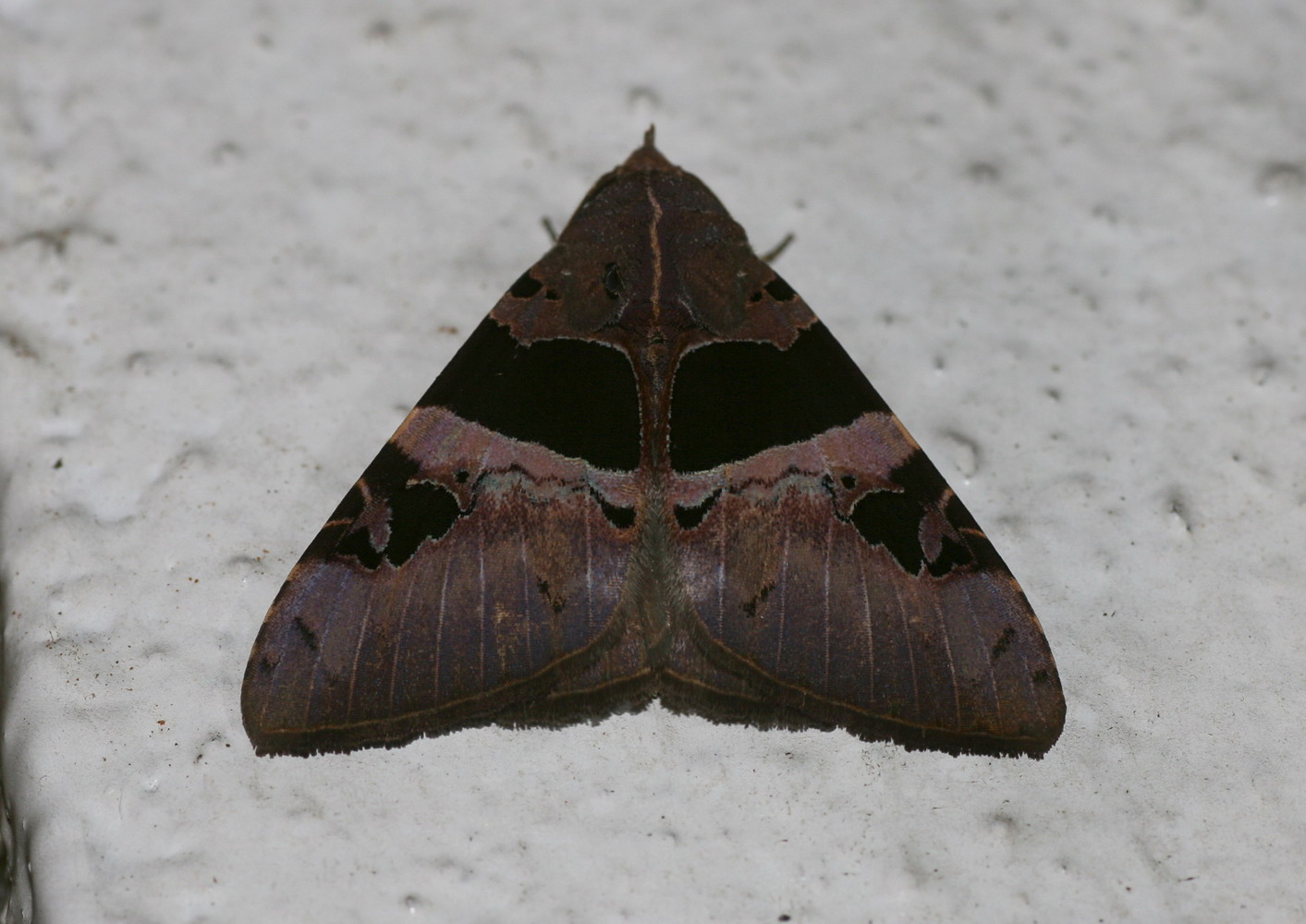

Scientific classification
- Kingdom: Animalia
- Phylum: Arthropoda
- Class: Insecta
- Order: Lepidoptera
- Superfamily: Noctuoidea
- Family: Erebidae
- Genus: Avatha
- Species: A. tepescens

Binomial name
- Avatha tepescens (Walker, 1858)

Synonyms
- Athyrma tepescens Walker, 1858; Athyrma tepescens Walker; Holloway, 1976; Pseudathyrma tepescens Walker; Kobes, 1985

= Avatha tepescens =

Species of moth

Avatha tepescens is a species of moth of the family Erebidae. It is found in Sundaland.
