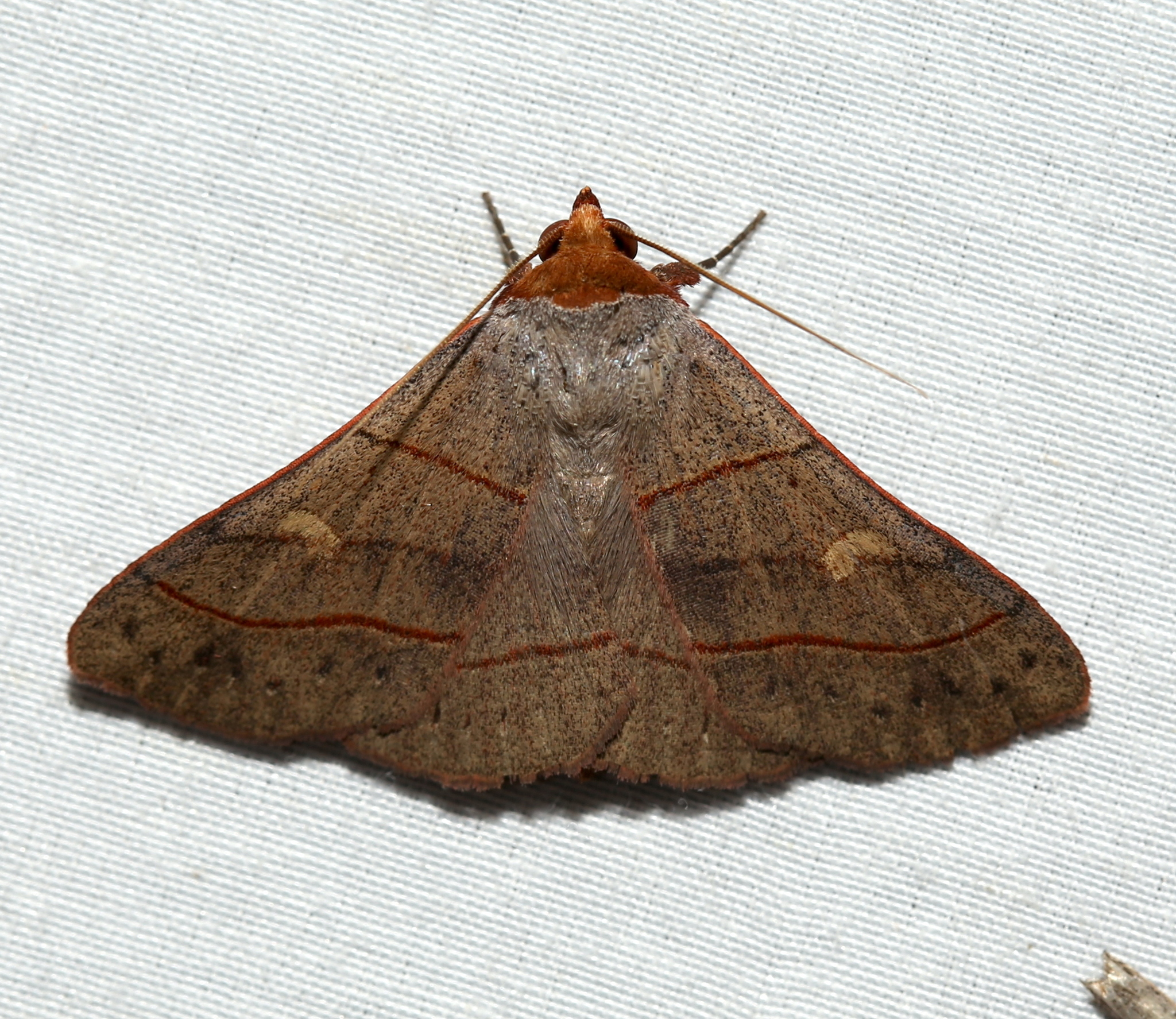

Scientific classification
- Kingdom: Animalia
- Phylum: Arthropoda
- Clade: Pancrustacea
- Class: Insecta
- Order: Lepidoptera
- Superfamily: Noctuoidea
- Family: Erebidae
- Genus: Panopoda
- Species: P. rufimargo

Binomial name
- Panopoda rufimargo (Hubner, 1818)

= Panopoda rufimargo =

Species of moth

Panopoda rufimargo, the red-lined panopoda, is an owlet moth in the family Erebidae. The species was first described by Jacob Hübner in 1818. It is found in North America. Caterpillars feed on pignut hickory and northern red oak.

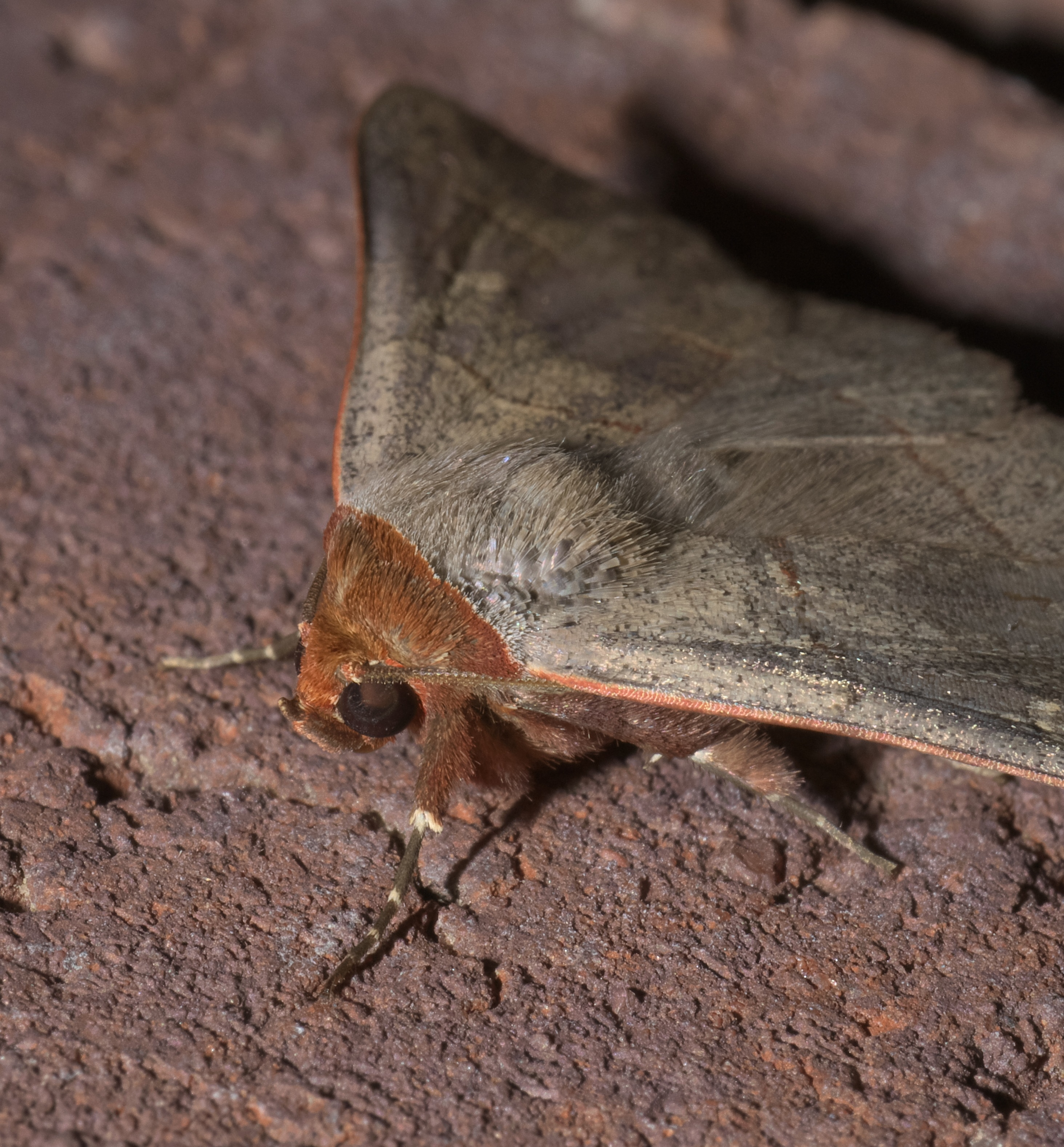
In Pryor, Oklahoma
