= Avatha eupepla =

Scientific classification
- Kingdom: Animalia
- Phylum: Arthropoda
- Clade: Pancrustacea
- Class: Insecta
- Order: Lepidoptera
- Superfamily: Noctuoidea
- Family: Erebidae
- Genus: Avatha
- Species: A. eupepla

Binomial name
- Avatha eupepla (Prout, 1924)

Synonyms
- Athyrma eupepla Prout, 1924

Species of moth

Avatha eupepla is a species of moth of the family Erebidae. It is found on Sumatra.
