= Azeta =

Scientific classification
- Kingdom: Animalia
- Phylum: Arthropoda
- Clade: Pancrustacea
- Class: Insecta
- Order: Lepidoptera
- Superfamily: Noctuoidea
- Family: Erebidae
- Subfamily: Eulepidotinae
- Genus: Azeta; Guenée, 1852

Synonyms
- Milyas Walker, 1858; Chabora Walker, 1865

Genus of moths

Azeta is a genus of moths in the family Erebidae.
