= Avatha pulcherrima =

Scientific classification
- Domain: Eukaryota
- Kingdom: Animalia
- Phylum: Arthropoda
- Class: Insecta
- Order: Lepidoptera
- Superfamily: Noctuoidea
- Family: Erebidae
- Genus: Avatha
- Species: A. pulcherrima

Binomial name
- Avatha pulcherrima Butler, 1892

Species of moth

Avatha pulcherrima is a species of moth of the family Erebidae. It is found in Sundaland and New Guinea. The habitat consists of lowland forests and lower montane forests.

Larvae have been reared on Pometia and Maniltoa species.
