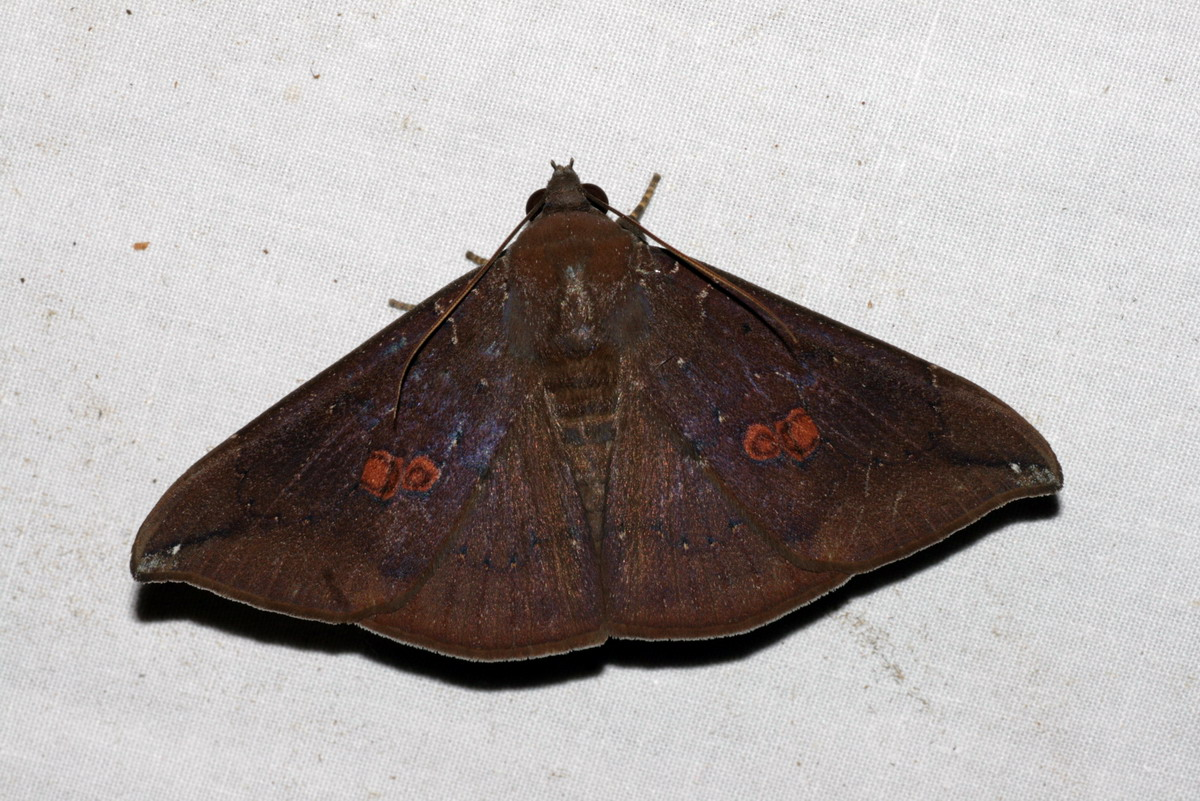
- Platyja umminia - Borneo, Crocker Range National Park. April 2009

Scientific classification
- Kingdom: Animalia
- Phylum: Arthropoda
- Clade: Pancrustacea
- Class: Insecta
- Order: Lepidoptera
- Superfamily: Noctuoidea
- Family: Noctuidae
- Genus: Platyja; Hübner, [1823]

Synonyms
- Cotuza Walker, 1858; Ginaea Walker, 1858; Cremnodes Felder, 1874; Yerongponga Lucas, 1901; Mocrendes Nye, 1975

= Platyja =

Genus of moths

Platyja is a genus of moths of the family Erebidae erected by Jacob Hübner in 1823.

== Description ==
Palpi with second joint broad, quadrately scaled and reaching vertex of head, and short, blunt and naked third joint. Thorax and abdomen smooth, where abdomen clothed with long coarse hair dorsally. Tibia and hind tarsi very hairy in male. Forewings with highly arched costa towards apex, which is produced and acute. The outer margin obliquely curved. Hindwings with short cell and truncate anal angle.

== Species ==
- Platyja acerces Prout, 1928
- Platyja argenteopunctata Bethune-Baker, 1906
- Platyja ciacula Swinhoe, 1893 Andaman Islands
- Platyja cyanocraspis Hampson, 1922
- Platyja cyanopasta (Turner, 1908) Australia
- Platyja exequialis (T. P. Lucas, 1901) Australia
- Platyja exviola Hampson, 1891
- Platyja flavimacula Semper, 1901
- Platyja griseomaculata Snellen, 1880
- Platyja lemur Felder, 1874
- Platyja minutipuncta Swinhoe, 1901
- Platyja phaenophoenica Hampson, 1905
- Platyja porphyria Turner, 1904
- Platyja retrahens Prout, 1921
- Platyja rufiscripta Swinhoe, 1904 Borneo
- Platyja silvani Zilli, 2001
- Platyja sumatrana Felder, 1874
- Platyja torsilinea Guenée, 1852
- Platyja umbrina (Doubleday, 1842)
- Platyja umminia (Cramer, [1780]) Java
