= Avatha uloptera =

Scientific classification
- Kingdom: Animalia
- Phylum: Arthropoda
- Clade: Pancrustacea
- Class: Insecta
- Order: Lepidoptera
- Superfamily: Noctuoidea
- Family: Erebidae
- Genus: Avatha
- Species: A. uloptera

Binomial name
- Avatha uloptera (Prout, 1925)

Synonyms
- Athyrma uloptera Prout, 1925; Pseudathryma uloptera

Species of moth

Avatha uloptera is a species of moth of the family Erebidae. It is found in Peninsular Malaysia, Thailand and on Sumatra and Borneo. The habitat consists of montane areas.
