= Avatha subpunctata =

Scientific classification
- Domain: Eukaryota
- Kingdom: Animalia
- Phylum: Arthropoda
- Class: Insecta
- Order: Lepidoptera
- Superfamily: Noctuoidea
- Family: Erebidae
- Genus: Avatha
- Species: A. subpunctata

Binomial name
- Avatha subpunctata (Bethune-Baker, 1906)

Synonyms
- Hypaetra subpunctata Bethune-Baker, 1906; Athyrma subpunctata

Species of moth

Avatha subpunctata is a species of moth of the family Erebidae first described by George Thomas Bethune-Baker in 1906. It is found on New Guinea and in Australia, where it has been recorded from Queensland.
