= Avatha pratti =

Scientific classification
- Domain: Eukaryota
- Kingdom: Animalia
- Phylum: Arthropoda
- Class: Insecta
- Order: Lepidoptera
- Superfamily: Noctuoidea
- Family: Erebidae
- Genus: Avatha
- Species: A. pratti

Binomial name
- Avatha pratti (Bethune-Baker, 1906)

Synonyms
- Hypaetra pratti Bethune-Baker, 1906; Athyrma pratti

Species of moth

Avatha pratti is a species of moth of the family Erebidae. It is found on New Guinea.
