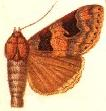

Scientific classification
- Domain: Eukaryota
- Kingdom: Animalia
- Phylum: Arthropoda
- Class: Insecta
- Order: Lepidoptera
- Superfamily: Noctuoidea
- Family: Erebidae
- Genus: Avatha
- Species: A. novoguineana

Binomial name
- Avatha novoguineana (Bethune-Baker, 1906)

Synonyms
- Hypaetra novaguineana Bethune-Baker, 1906

= Avatha novoguineana =

Species of moth

Avatha novoguineana is a species of moth of the family Erebidae. It is found on New Guinea and Cape York, Australia.

The wingspan is about 40 mm.
