= Avatha mixosema =

Scientific classification
- Kingdom: Animalia
- Phylum: Arthropoda
- Clade: Pancrustacea
- Class: Insecta
- Order: Lepidoptera
- Superfamily: Noctuoidea
- Family: Erebidae
- Genus: Avatha
- Species: A. mixosema

Binomial name
- Avatha mixosema (Prout, 1928)

Synonyms
- Athyrma mixosema Prout, 1928

Species of moth

Avatha mixosema is a species of moth of the family Erebidae. It is found on Sumatra.
