= Avatha rufiscripta =

Scientific classification
- Kingdom: Animalia
- Phylum: Arthropoda
- Class: Insecta
- Order: Lepidoptera
- Superfamily: Noctuoidea
- Family: Erebidae
- Genus: Avatha
- Species: A. rufiscripta

Binomial name
- Avatha rufiscripta (Hampson, 1926)

Synonyms
- Athyrma rufiscripta Hampson, 1926; Pseudathryma rufiscripta

Species of moth

Avatha rufiscripta is a species of moth of the family Erebidae. It is found in Peninsular Malaysia and on Sumatra and Borneo. The habitat consists of lowland forests.
