= Avatha spilota =

Scientific classification
- Kingdom: Animalia
- Phylum: Arthropoda
- Clade: Pancrustacea
- Class: Insecta
- Order: Lepidoptera
- Superfamily: Noctuoidea
- Family: Erebidae
- Genus: Avatha
- Species: A. spilota

Binomial name
- Avatha spilota (Joicey & Talbot, 1917)

Synonyms
- Athyrma spilota Joicey & Talbot, 1917

Species of moth

Avatha spilota is a species of moth of the family Erebidae first described by James John Joicey and George Talbot in 1917. It is found in Papua, Indonesia, where it has been recorded from the Anggi Lakes, Mount Goliath and the Pass Valley.
