= Avatha paucimacula =

Scientific classification
- Domain: Eukaryota
- Kingdom: Animalia
- Phylum: Arthropoda
- Class: Insecta
- Order: Lepidoptera
- Superfamily: Noctuoidea
- Family: Erebidae
- Genus: Avatha
- Species: A. paucimacula

Binomial name
- Avatha paucimacula (Roepke, 1941)

Synonyms
- Athyrma paucimacula Roepke, 1941

Species of moth

Avatha paucimacula is a species of moth of the family Erebidae. It is found on Java and Sumatra.
