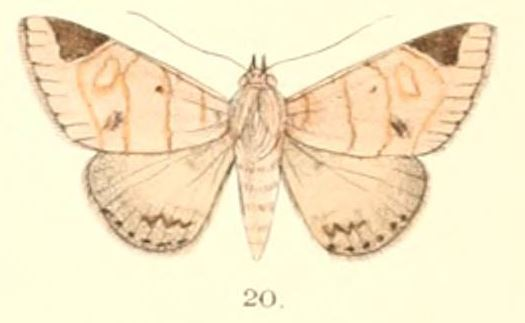

Scientific classification
- Kingdom: Animalia
- Phylum: Arthropoda
- Clade: Pancrustacea
- Class: Insecta
- Order: Lepidoptera
- Superfamily: Noctuoidea
- Family: Erebidae
- Subfamily: Calpinae
- Genus: Dordura; Moore, 1882
- Species: D. aliena

Binomial name
- Dordura aliena Walker, 1865

Synonyms
- Avatha modesta (Roepke, 1956); Hypaetra modesta Roepke, 1956; Hypaetra aliena Walker, 1865; Dordura apicalis Moore, 1882; Dysgonia tincta Hampson, 1893

= Dordura =

Genus of moths

Dordura is a monotypic genus of moths in the family Noctuidae erected by Frederic Moore in 1882. Its only species, Dordura aliena, was first described by Francis Walker in 1865. It is found in the Indian subregion, Sri Lanka, Myanmar, Thailand, Peninsular Malaysia, Sumatra, Borneo and New Guinea.

== Description ==
Its wingspan is about 40 mm. Antennae of male with long branches on the outer sides, very short branches and long stiff bristles on the inner side. A tuft of hair found on upperside of shaft near base. Body reddish brown. Head and collar whitish. Palpi fuscous at sides. Thorax purplish fuscous and abdomen fuscous. Forewings are purplish fuscous, with very indistinct waved subbasal and antemedial lines. A dark spot can be seen in cell. A postmedial line angled outwards below costa, irregularly excurved beyond cell, then bent inwards to below the narrow reniform spot. Reniform straight and double to inner margin. There are some white specks on costa and a sub-triangular chocolate mark with pale edges on costa before apex. Postmedial line arising near apex, and is slightly dentate and very obliquely curved to vein 2, then straight to inner margin. Hindwings with apical area fuscous. Medial and postmedial ill-defined, waved, dark lines and submarginal series of black specks. Female with less distinct forewing markings and triangular patch almost obsolete.
