= Avatha rhynchophora =

Scientific classification
- Kingdom: Animalia
- Phylum: Arthropoda
- Clade: Pancrustacea
- Class: Insecta
- Order: Lepidoptera
- Superfamily: Noctuoidea
- Family: Erebidae
- Genus: Avatha
- Species: A. rhynchophora

Binomial name
- Avatha rhynchophora (Prout, 1924)

Synonyms
- Athyrma rhynchophora Prout, 1924

Species of moth

Avatha rhynchophora is a species of moth of the family Erebidae first described by Prout in 1924. It is found in Papua, where it has been recorded from Mount Kunupi, Langda and the Utakwa River.
