= Avatha heterographa =

Scientific classification
- Kingdom: Animalia
- Phylum: Arthropoda
- Class: Insecta
- Order: Lepidoptera
- Superfamily: Noctuoidea
- Family: Erebidae
- Genus: Avatha
- Species: A. heterographa

Binomial name
- Avatha heterographa (Hampson, 1912)

Synonyms
- Athyrma heterographa Hampson, 1912

Species of moth

Avatha heterographa is a species of moth of the family Erebidae. It is found in Myanmar and on Sumatra and Borneo. The habitat consists of montane forests.
