= Avatha subumbra =

Scientific classification
- Domain: Eukaryota
- Kingdom: Animalia
- Phylum: Arthropoda
- Class: Insecta
- Order: Lepidoptera
- Superfamily: Noctuoidea
- Family: Erebidae
- Genus: Avatha
- Species: A. subumbra

Binomial name
- Avatha subumbra (Bethune-Baker, 1906)

Synonyms
- Ophiusa subumbra Bethune-Baker, 1906; Athyrma subumbra; Serrodes subumbra

Species of moth

Avatha subumbra is a species of moth of the family Erebidae. It is found on New Guinea and Australia, where it has been recorded from Queensland.
