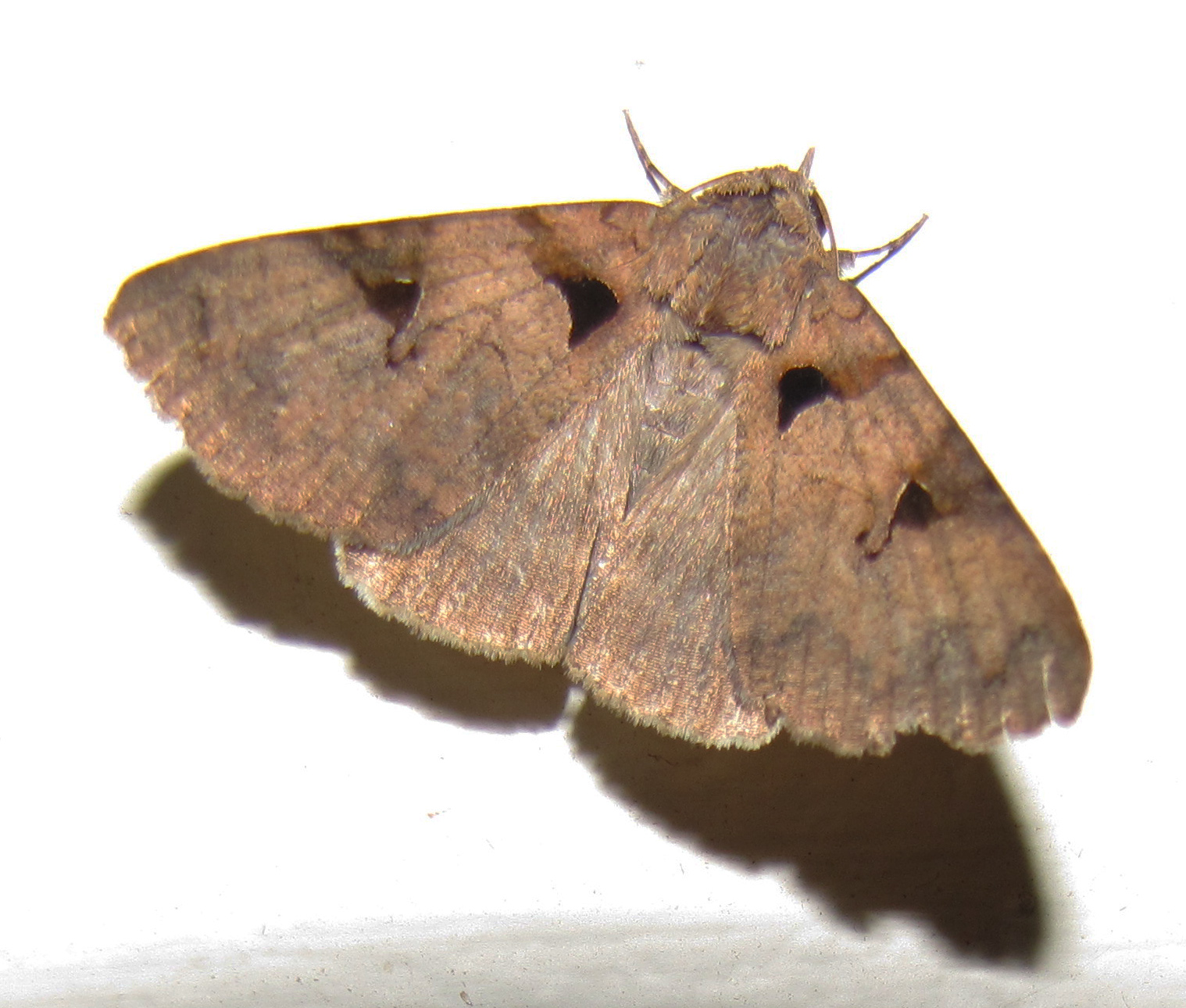

Scientific classification
- Domain: Eukaryota
- Kingdom: Animalia
- Phylum: Arthropoda
- Class: Insecta
- Order: Lepidoptera
- Superfamily: Noctuoidea
- Family: Erebidae
- Genus: Avatha
- Species: A. discolor

Binomial name
- Avatha discolor (Fabricius, 1794)

Synonyms
- Noctua discolor Fabricius, 1794; Avatha includens Walker, 1857; Hypaetra trigonifera Walker, 1858; Hypaetra curvifera Walker, 1858; Hypaetra complacens Walker, 1858; Ophiusa frontalis Walker, 1858; Achaea expectans Walker, 1858; Avatha complacens (Walker, 1858); Avatha curvifera (Walker, 1858); Avatha frontalis (Walker, 1858); Avatha trigonifera (Walker, 1858); Avatha caunindana (Strand, 1920); Hypaetra delunaris Strand, 1917; Hypaetra devittalis Strand, 1917; Hypaetra discoloralis Strand, 1917; Hypaetra subdiscoloralis Strand, 1917; Hypaetra thursdayensis Strand, 1917

= Avatha discolor =

Species of moth

Avatha discolor is a species of moth of the family Erebidae. It is found from the Indo-Australian and Pacific tropics to as far east as Henderson Island.

== Description ==
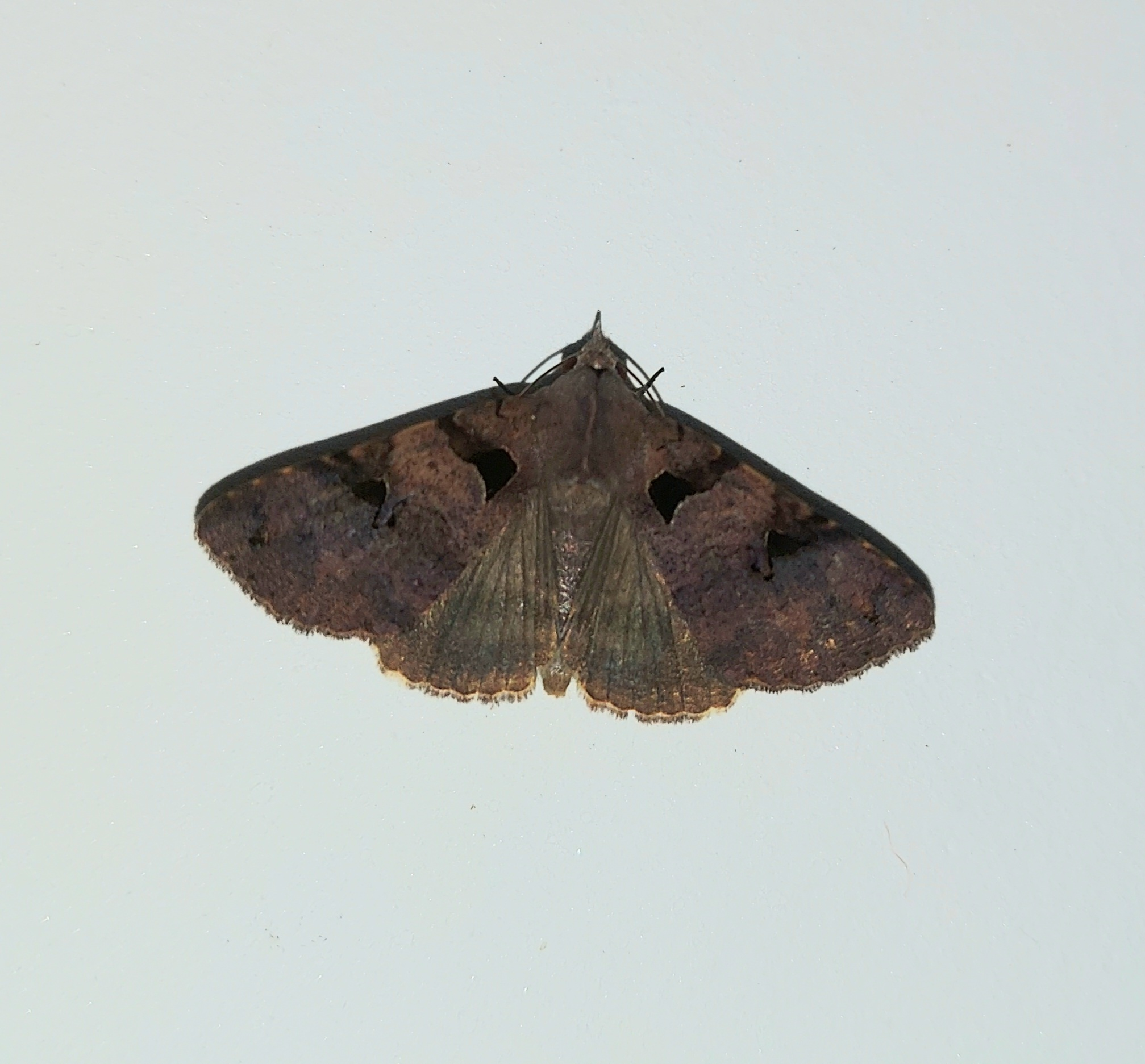
from Sri Lanka

Its wingspan is about 40–46 mm. Males with minutely ciliated antennae and subcostal neuration of forewings not distorted and without sexual patches on forewings and hindwings. Forewings are greyish and fuscous suffused. No spots on costa. The lunule on the antemedial line sometimes obsolescent. A dark spot found in the cell. The postmedial line "S-shaped" beyond the cell with a blackish patch in its upper curve. Hindwings with whitish cilia at apex and near anal angle.

Recorded food plants are Nephelium, Sapindus, and Callicarpa.
