= Focillidia texana =

Scientific classification
- Kingdom: Animalia
- Phylum: Arthropoda
- Class: Insecta
- Order: Lepidoptera
- Superfamily: Noctuoidea
- Family: Erebidae
- Tribe: Poaphilini
- Genus: Focillidia
- Species: F. texana

Binomial name
- Focillidia texana Hampson, 1913

Species of moth

Focillidia texana, the southern focillidia moth, is a species of moth in the family Erebidae. It is found in North America.

The MONA or Hodges number for Focillidia texana is 8730.
