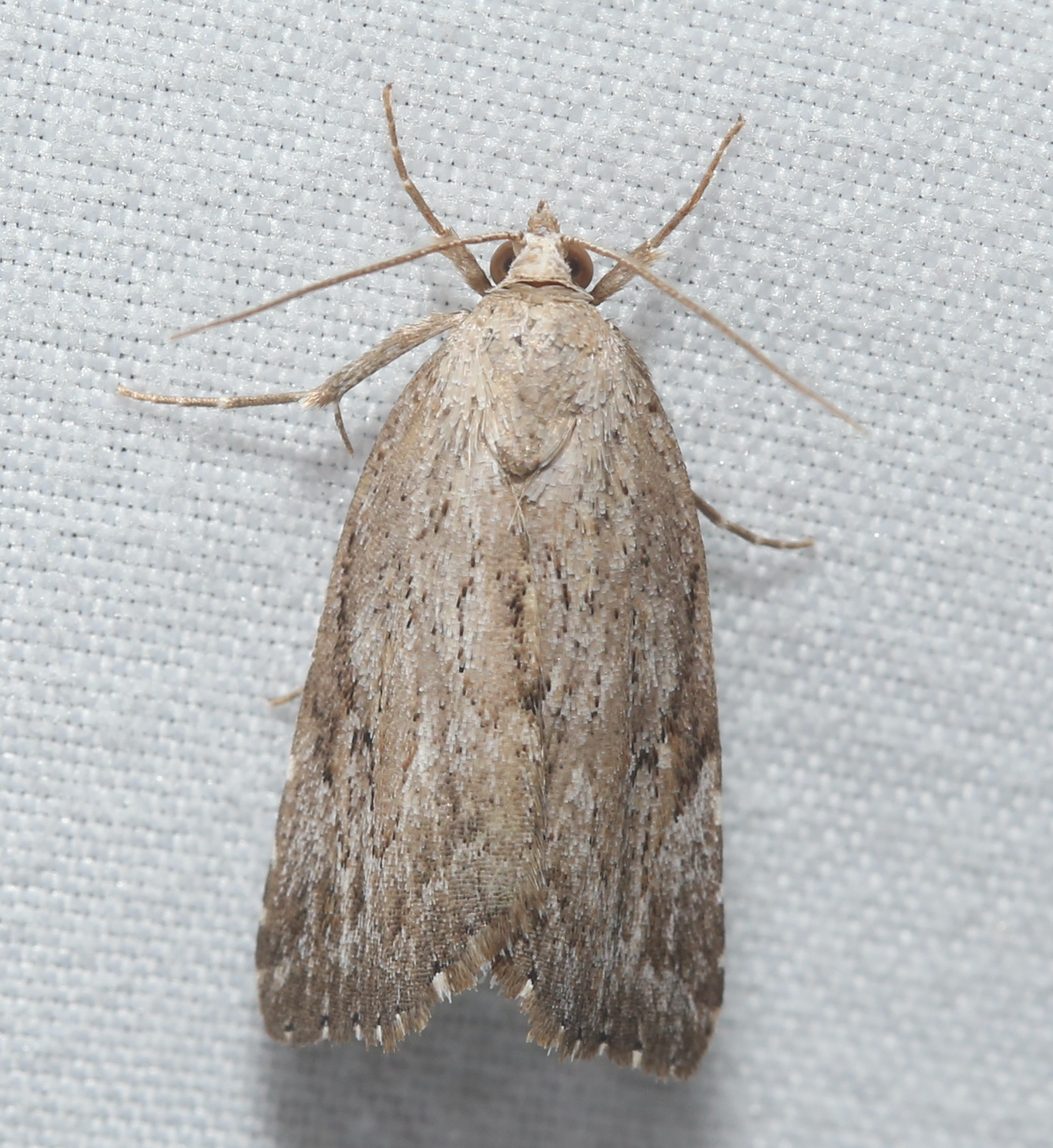

Scientific classification
- Kingdom: Animalia
- Phylum: Arthropoda
- Class: Insecta
- Order: Lepidoptera
- Superfamily: Noctuoidea
- Family: Erebidae
- Tribe: Poaphilini
- Genus: Cutina
- Species: C. albopunctella

Binomial name
- Cutina albopunctella Walker, 1866

= Cutina albopunctella =

Species of moth

Cutina albopunctella, the cypress looper or white-spotted cutina moth, is a species of moth in the family Erebidae. It is found in North America.

The MONA or Hodges number for Cutina albopunctella is 8728.
