= Cutina arcuata =

Scientific classification
- Domain: Eukaryota
- Kingdom: Animalia
- Phylum: Arthropoda
- Class: Insecta
- Order: Lepidoptera
- Superfamily: Noctuoidea
- Family: Erebidae
- Tribe: Poaphilini
- Genus: Cutina
- Species: C. arcuata

Binomial name
- Cutina arcuata Pogue & Ferguson, 1998

Species of moth

Cutina arcuata, the curve-lined cutina moth, is a species of moth in the family Erebidae. It is found in North America.

The MONA or Hodges number for Cutina arcuata is 8729.2.
