= O. nobilis =

O. nobilis may refer to:

- Oedemera nobilis, a beetle species found in Western Europe including the south of England
- Ophisma nobilis, a moth species found in Costa Rica
- Oreonympha nobilis, the bearded mountaineer, a hummingbird species found only in Peru
- Orthonevra nobilis, a hoverfly species
- Ostryopsis nobilis, a plant species found in China
- Otidiphaps nobilis, the pheasant pigeon, a large terrestrial pigeon species found in the primary rainforests of New Guinea and nearby islands

== See also ==
- Nobilis (disambiguation)
