= Cutina aluticolor =

Scientific classification
- Domain: Eukaryota
- Kingdom: Animalia
- Phylum: Arthropoda
- Class: Insecta
- Order: Lepidoptera
- Superfamily: Noctuoidea
- Family: Erebidae
- Tribe: Poaphilini
- Genus: Cutina
- Species: C. aluticolor

Binomial name
- Cutina aluticolor Pogue & Ferguson, 1998

Species of moth

Cutina aluticolor, the leathery cutina moth, is a species of moth in the family Erebidae. It is found in North America.

The MONA or Hodges number for Cutina aluticolor is 8729.1.
