= C. erecta =

C. erecta may refer to:

- Chalciope erecta, a moth species found in Africa
- Commelina erecta, the white mouth dayflower or slender dayflower, a perennial herb species native throughout the Americas

== See also ==
- Erecta
