= O. tropicalis =

O. tropicalis may refer to:

- Ophisma tropicalis, a moth species found in tropical and subtropical America
- Otomys tropicalis, the tropical Vlei rat, a rodent species found in Burundi, Democratic Republic of the Congo, Kenya, Rwanda, Sudan and Uganda
