= Ophisma =

- O. tropicalis, Brazil

Scientific classification
- Kingdom: Animalia
- Phylum: Arthropoda
- Clade: Pancrustacea
- Class: Insecta
- Order: Lepidoptera
- Superfamily: Noctuoidea
- Family: Erebidae
- Tribe: Poaphilini
- Genus: Ophisma; Guenée, 1852

Genus of moths

Ophisma is a genus of moths in the family Erebidae. The genus was erected by Achille Guenée in 1852.

== Species ==
- Ophisma aeolida Druce, 1890
- Ophisma albitermia Hampson, 1910
- Ophisma basigutta Felder & Rogenhofer, 1874
- Ophisma cuprizonea Hampson, 1913
- Ophisma despagnesi Guenée, 1852
- Ophisma diatonica Möschler, 1880
- Ophisma exuleata Möschler, 1883
- Ophisma fulvipuncta Schaus, 1911
- Ophisma gravata Guenée, 1852
- Ophisma ibona Plötz, 1880
- Ophisma lunulifera Walker, 1865
- Ophisma minna Guenée, 1852
- Ophisma ningi Plötz, 1880
- Ophisma nobilis Schaus, 1911
- Ophisma pallescens (Walker, 1864)
- Ophisma pyrosticha Druce, 1912
- Ophisma sinuata Schaus, 1901
- Ophisma tecta Schaus, 1894
- Ophisma teterrima Hampson, 1913
- Ophisma tropicalis Guenée, 1852
- Ophisma turturoides Walker, 1858
- Ophisma variata Schaus, 1901
