= Mimophisma =

Scientific classification
- Kingdom: Animalia
- Phylum: Arthropoda
- Class: Insecta
- Order: Lepidoptera
- Superfamily: Noctuoidea
- Family: Erebidae
- Tribe: Poaphilini
- Genus: Mimophisma; Hampson, 1926

Genus of moths

Mimophisma is a genus of moths in the family Erebidae. The genus was erected by George Hampson in 1926.

== Species ==
- Mimophisma albifimbria Hampson, 1926
- Mimophisma delunaris (Guenee, 1852)
- Mimophisma forbesi Schaus, 1940
