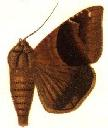

Scientific classification
- Kingdom: Animalia
- Phylum: Arthropoda
- Class: Insecta
- Order: Lepidoptera
- Superfamily: Noctuoidea
- Family: Erebidae
- Genus: Ophisma
- Species: O. tecta

Binomial name
- Ophisma tecta Schaus, 1894

= Ophisma tecta =

Species of moth

Ophisma tecta is a moth of the family Noctuidae first described by William Schaus in 1894. It is found in South America, including Brazil, French Guiana and Costa Rica.

The wingspan is about 40 mm.
