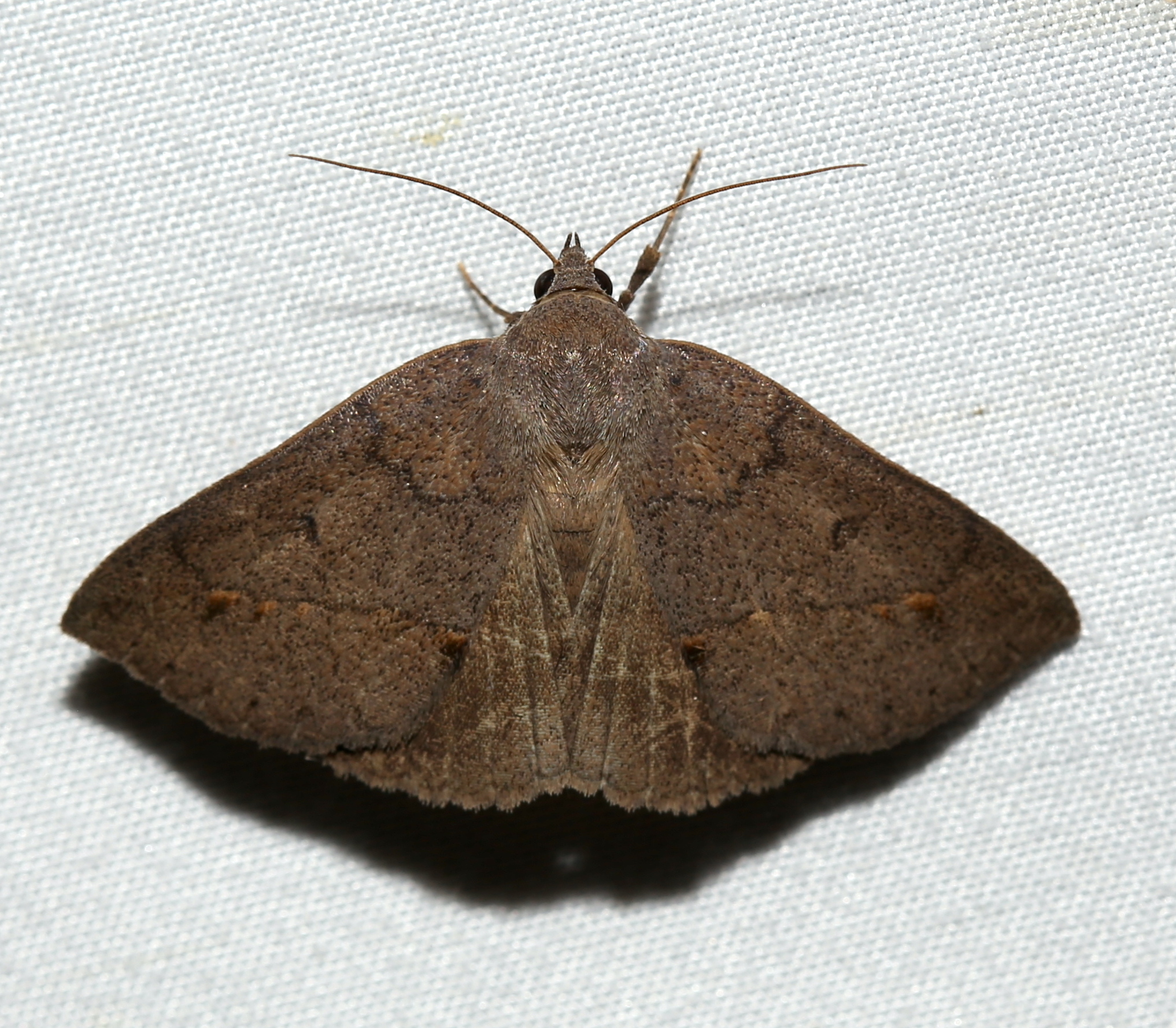

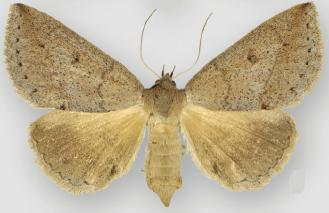
- Female

Scientific classification
- Kingdom: Animalia
- Phylum: Arthropoda
- Clade: Pancrustacea
- Class: Insecta
- Order: Lepidoptera
- Superfamily: Noctuoidea
- Family: Erebidae
- Genus: Argyrostrotis
- Species: A. flavistriaria

Binomial name
- Argyrostrotis flavistriaria (Hübner, [1831])

Synonyms
- Crochiphora flavistriaria Hübner, [1831]; Poaphila herbicola Guenée, 1852; Poaphila contempta Guenée, 1852; Poaphila perplexa Guenée, 1852; Poaphila perspicua Walker, 1858; Mocis diffundens Walker, 1858; Phurys glans Grote, 1876; Phurys carolina Smith, 1905

= Argyrostrotis flavistriaria =

Yellow-lined chocolate moth

Species of moth

Argyrostrotis flavistriaria, the yellow-lined chocolate moth, is a moth of the family Noctuidae. The species was first described by Jacob Hübner in 1831. It is found in the US from North Carolina south to Florida and Texas.

The larvae feed on Cyrilla racemiflora.
