= Focillidia =

Scientific classification
- Kingdom: Animalia
- Phylum: Arthropoda
- Class: Insecta
- Order: Lepidoptera
- Superfamily: Noctuoidea
- Family: Erebidae
- Tribe: Poaphilini
- Genus: Focillidia; Hampson, 1913

Genus of moths

Focillidia is a genus of moths in the family Erebidae first described by George Hampson in 1913.

== Species ==
- Focillidia grenadensis Hampson, 1913
- Focillidia texana Hampson, 1913
