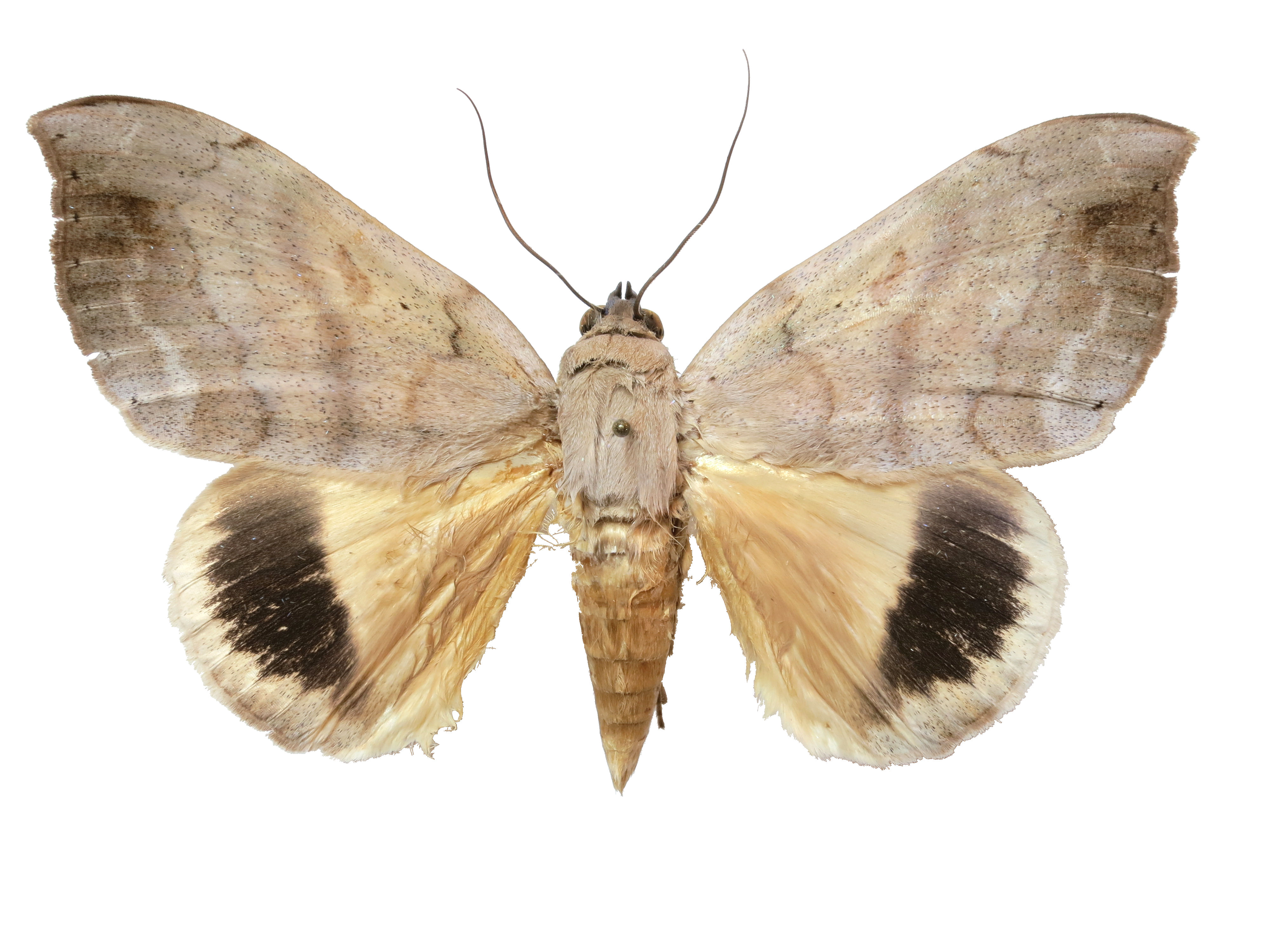
- Ophisma pallescens, Ngoc Linh, Vietnam

Scientific classification
- Kingdom: Animalia
- Phylum: Arthropoda
- Class: Insecta
- Order: Lepidoptera
- Superfamily: Noctuoidea
- Family: Erebidae
- Genus: Ophisma
- Species: O. pallescens

Binomial name
- Ophisma pallescens (Walker, 1864)

Synonyms
- Lagoptera pallescens Walker, 1864; Lagoptera violetta Pagenstecher, 1897; Ophisma intermedia (A. E. Prout, 1922); Ophisma subplaga (Bethune-Baker, 1906); Ophisma violetta (Pagenstecher, 1896); Ophiusa pallescens subplaga Bethune-Baker, 1906; Ophisma pallescens intermedia Prout, 1922

= Ophisma pallescens =

Species of moth

Ophisma pallescens is a moth of the family Noctuidae first described by Francis Walker in 1864. It is found in Thailand, Peninsular Malaysia, Sumatra, Borneo, Sulawesi, Seram and New Guinea.
