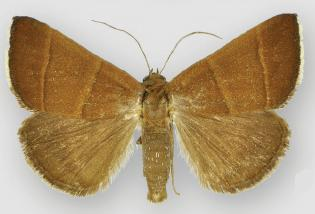
- Argyrostrotis quadrifilaris

Scientific classification
- Kingdom: Animalia
- Phylum: Arthropoda
- Clade: Pancrustacea
- Class: Insecta
- Order: Lepidoptera
- Superfamily: Noctuoidea
- Family: Erebidae
- Tribe: Poaphilini
- Genus: Argyrostrotis; Hübner, [1821]

Synonyms
- Agnomonia Hübner, [1831]; Crochiphora Hübner, [1831]; Argyrostrotus Agassiz, [1847]; Poaphila Guenée, 1852

= Argyrostrotis =

Genus of moths

Argyrostrotis is a genus of moths in the family Erebidae. The genus was erected by Jacob Hübner in 1821.

== Species ==
- Argyrostrotis anilis Drury, 1773
- Argyrostrotis deleta Guenée, 1852
- Argyrostrotis erasa Guenée, 1852
- Argyrostrotis flavistriaria Hübner, 1831
- Argyrostrotis quadrifilaris Hübner, 1831
- Argyrostrotis sylvarum Guenée, 1852
