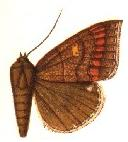

Scientific classification
- Kingdom: Animalia
- Phylum: Arthropoda
- Class: Insecta
- Order: Lepidoptera
- Superfamily: Noctuoidea
- Family: Erebidae
- Genus: Ophisma
- Species: O. cuprizonea

Binomial name
- Ophisma cuprizonea Hampson, 1913

= Ophisma cuprizonea =

Species of moth

Ophisma cuprizonea is a moth of the family Erebidae. It is found in Madagascar.
