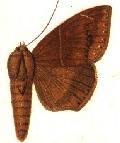

Scientific classification
- Kingdom: Animalia
- Phylum: Arthropoda
- Class: Insecta
- Order: Lepidoptera
- Superfamily: Noctuoidea
- Family: Erebidae
- Genus: Ophisma
- Species: O. variata

Binomial name
- Ophisma variata Schaus, 1901

= Ophisma variata =

Species of moth

Ophisma variata is a moth of the family Noctuidae first described by William Schaus in 1901. It is found in South America, including Costa Rica and Brazil.
