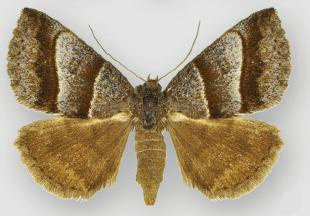

Scientific classification
- Kingdom: Animalia
- Phylum: Arthropoda
- Class: Insecta
- Order: Lepidoptera
- Superfamily: Noctuoidea
- Family: Erebidae
- Genus: Argyrostrotis
- Species: A. sylvarum

Binomial name
- Argyrostrotis sylvarum (Guenée, 1852)

Synonyms
- Poaphila sylvarum Guenée, 1852

= Argyrostrotis sylvarum =

Species of moth

Argyrostrotis sylvarum, the woodland chocolate moth or brown wavy line argyrostrotis, is a moth of the family Noctuidae. The species was first described by Achille Guenée in 1852. It is found in the US from Virginia south to Florida and Texas.

The wingspan is about 28 mm.
