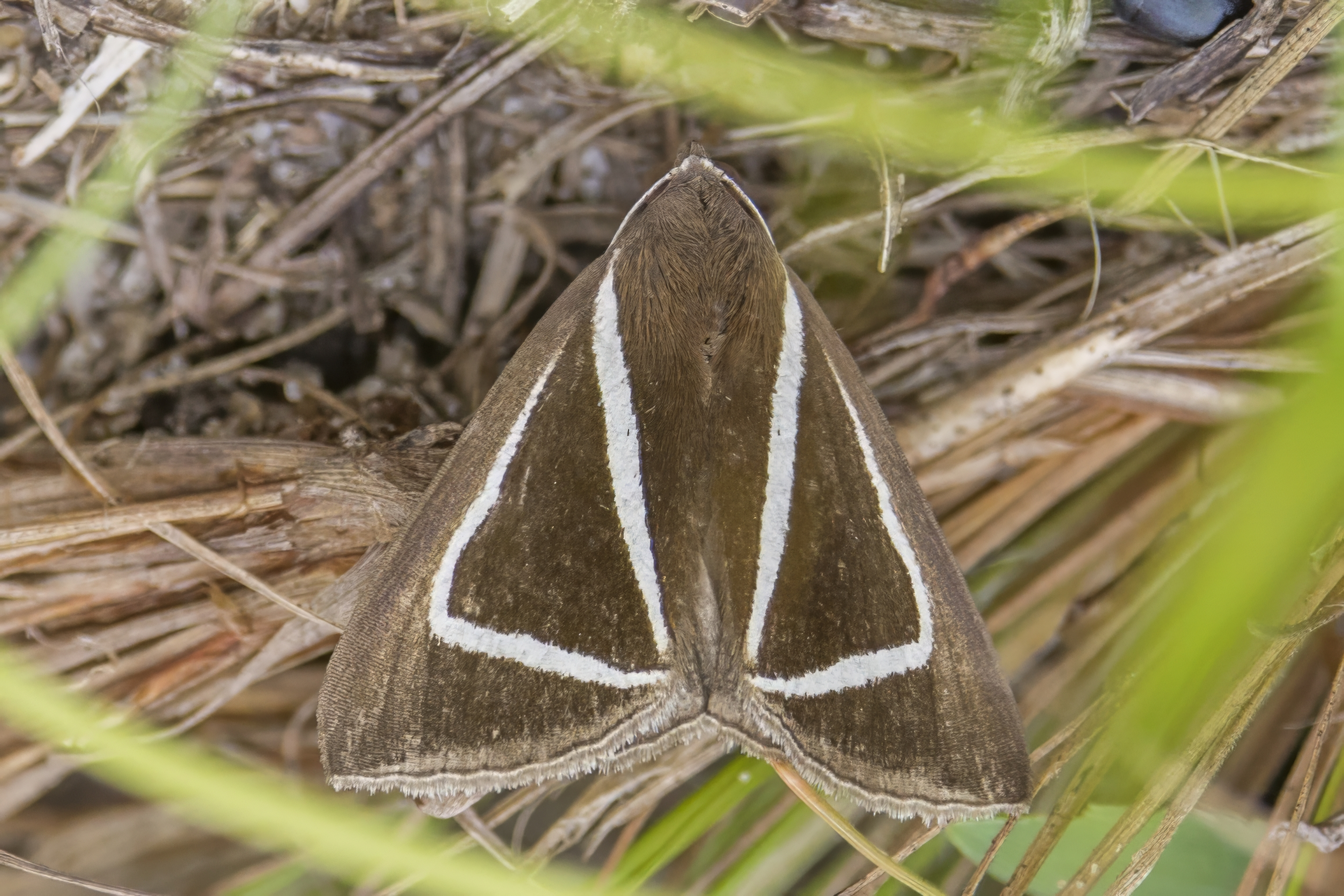
- C. delta, Mozambique

Scientific classification
- Kingdom: Animalia
- Phylum: Arthropoda
- Clade: Pancrustacea
- Class: Insecta
- Order: Lepidoptera
- Superfamily: Noctuoidea
- Family: Erebidae
- Tribe: Poaphilini
- Genus: Chalciope; Hübner, [1823]

Synonyms
- Euclidisema Hampson

= Chalciope (moth) =

Genus of moths

Chalciope is a genus of moths in the family Erebidae.

== Species ==
- Chalciope alcyona Druce, 1888
- Chalciope bisinuata Snellen, 1880
- Chalciope delta (Boisduval, 1833) (= Chalciope crestonion (Snellen, 1902))
- Chalciope emathion Snellen, 1902
- Chalciope erecta Hampson, 1902
- Chalciope imminua Snellen, 1902
- Chalciope mygdon Cramer, [1777]
- Chalciope pusilla (Holland, 1894)
- Chalciope trigonodesia Strand, 1915
