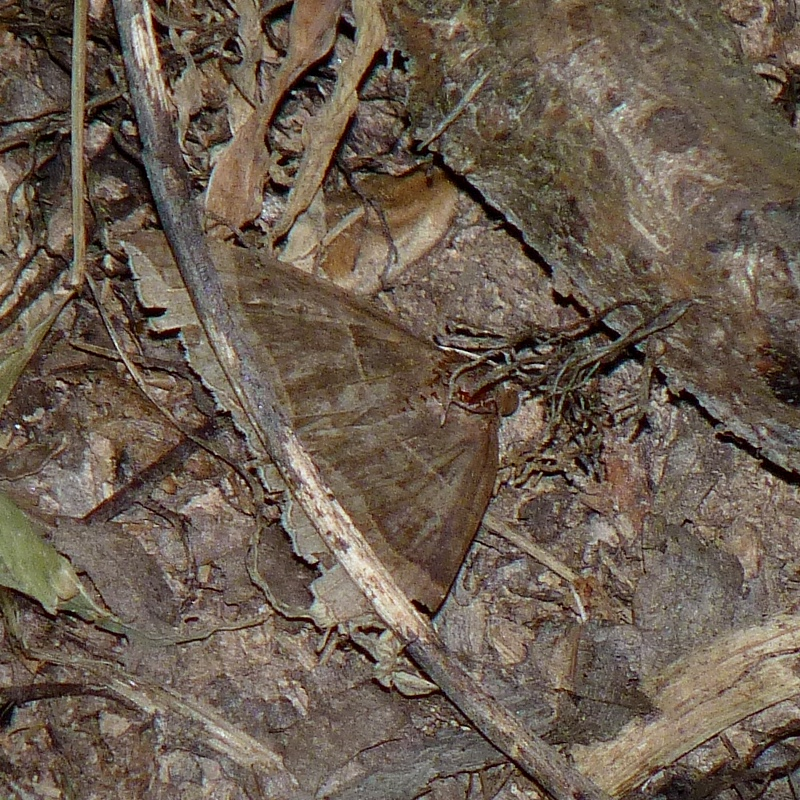

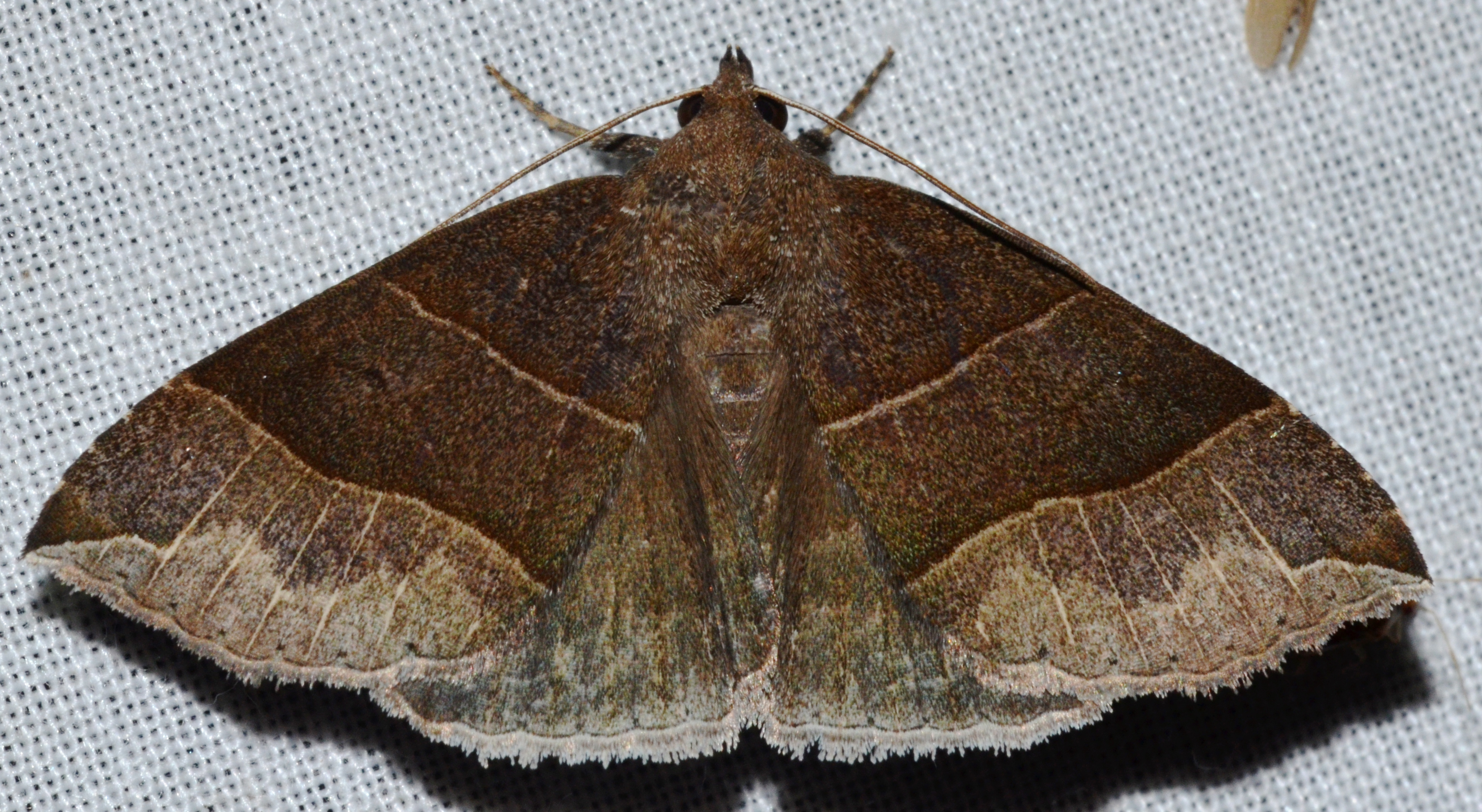

Scientific classification
- Kingdom: Animalia
- Phylum: Arthropoda
- Clade: Pancrustacea
- Class: Insecta
- Order: Lepidoptera
- Superfamily: Noctuoidea
- Family: Erebidae
- Genus: Parallelia
- Species: P. bistriaris

Binomial name
- Parallelia bistriaris Hübner, 1818

Synonyms
- Parallelia amplissima (Walker, 1858); Poaphila amplissima Walker, 1858

= Parallelia bistriaris =

Species of moth

Parallelia bistriaris, the maple looper moth, is a moth of the family Erebidae. The species was first described by Jacob Hübner in 1818. It is found in eastern North America.

The wingspan is 33–43 mm (1.3–1.7 in). Adults are on wing from April to September. There is one generation per year.

The larvae feed on various trees, including birch, maple, and walnut.

This species utilizes camouflage in both its larval and adult forms, resembling twigs and dead leaves, respectively.

This species as an adult is most readily identified by its dark brown body, two parallel lighter lines going down the length of the body, and a grey edge that extends to the edge of the forewing, resembling fallen leaves.
