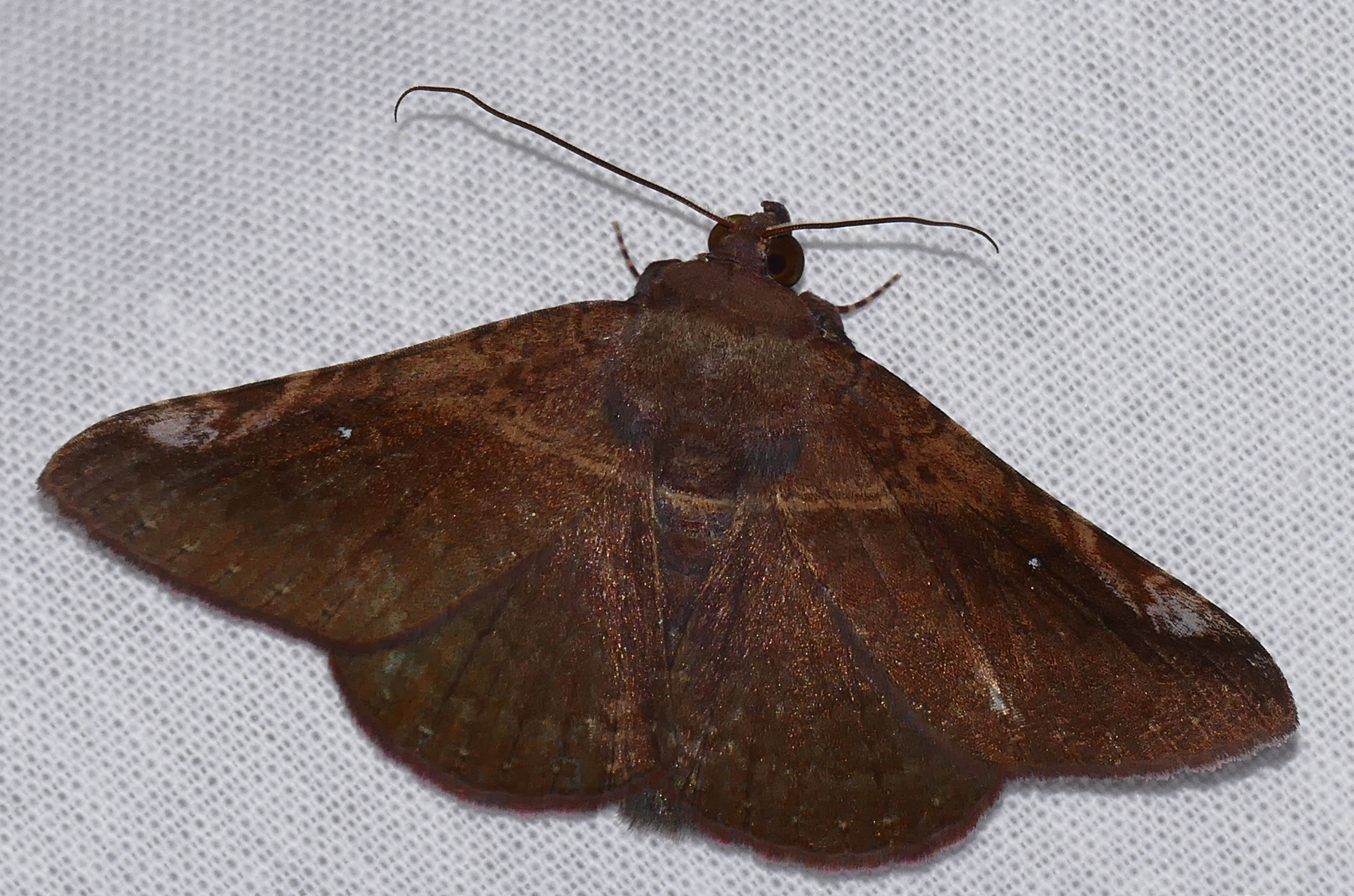

Scientific classification
- Kingdom: Animalia
- Phylum: Arthropoda
- Class: Insecta
- Order: Lepidoptera
- Superfamily: Noctuoidea
- Family: Erebidae
- Genus: Ophisma
- Species: O. minna

Binomial name
- Ophisma minna Guenée, 1852

= Ophisma minna =

Species of moth

Ophisma minna is a moth of the family Noctuidae first described by Achille Guenée in 1852. It is found in South America, including Costa Rica and French Guiana.
