= Cutina =

Scientific classification
- Kingdom: Animalia
- Phylum: Arthropoda
- Class: Insecta
- Order: Lepidoptera
- Superfamily: Noctuoidea
- Family: Erebidae
- Tribe: Poaphilini
- Genus: Cutina; Walker, 1866

Genus of moths

Cutina is a genus of moths in the family Erebidae.This cladogram follows the Catalogue of Life.

== Species ==
- Cutina albopunctella Walker, 1866
- Cutina aluticolor Pogue & Ferguson, 1998
- Cutina arcuata Pogue & Ferguson, 1998
- Cutina distincta Grote, 1883
