= Chalciope alcyona =

Scientific classification
- Domain: Eukaryota
- Kingdom: Animalia
- Phylum: Arthropoda
- Class: Insecta
- Order: Lepidoptera
- Superfamily: Noctuoidea
- Family: Erebidae
- Genus: Chalciope
- Species: C. alcyona

Binomial name
- Chalciope alcyona H. Druce, 1888

Synonyms
- Euclidisema alcyona (H. Druce, 1888); Grammodes alcyona H. Druce, 1888; Grammodes hoplitis Meyrick, 1902; Trigonodes isosceles Warren, 1903; Chalciope hoplitis (Meyrick, 1902); Chalciope isosceles (Warren, 1903)

Species of moth

Chalciope alcyona is a moth of the family Noctuidae first described by Herbert Druce in 1888. It is found in the south Pacific, including Fiji, New Guinea, New Caledonia and Australia.

The larvae can become a pest on Oryza sativa.
