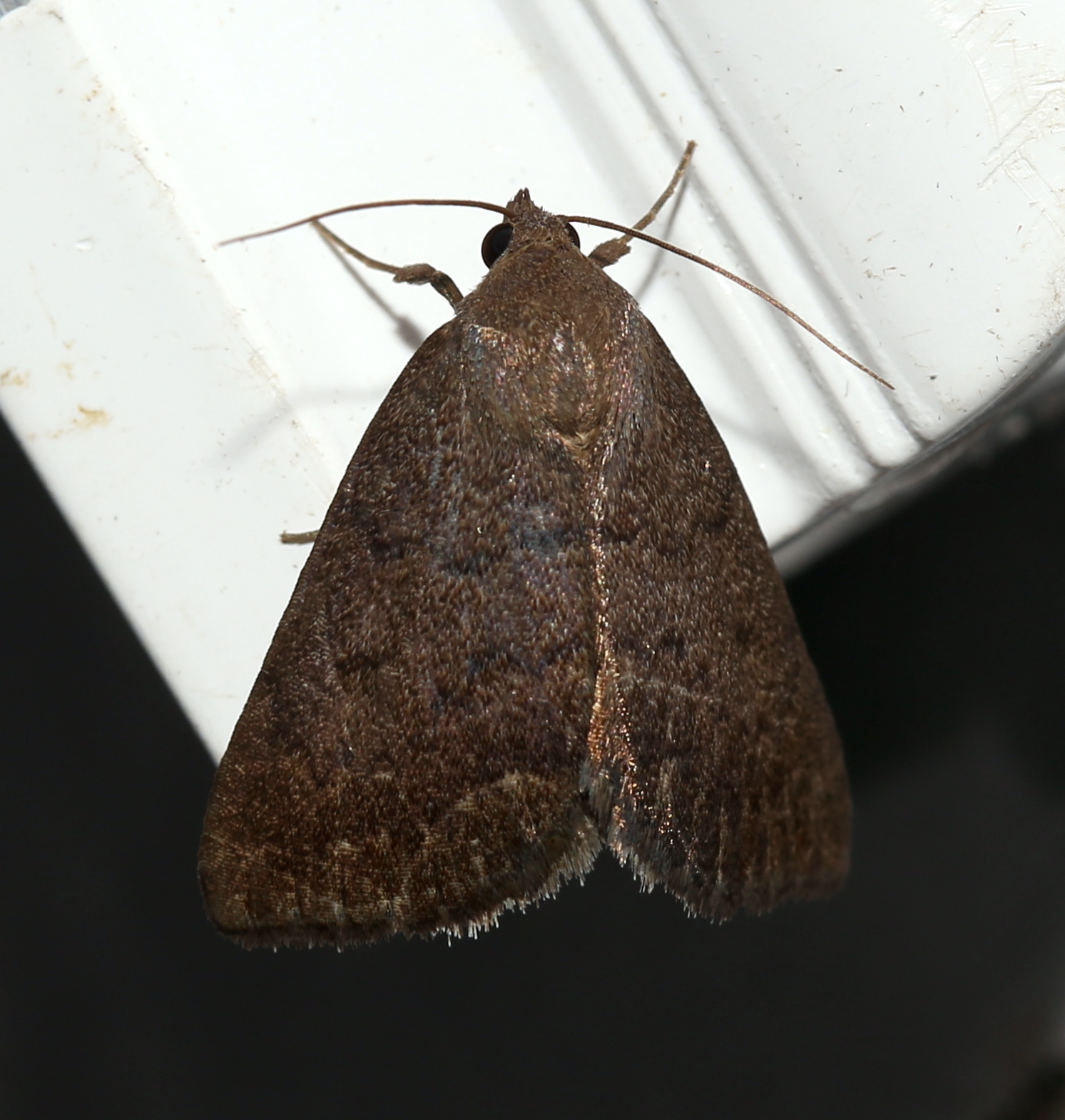

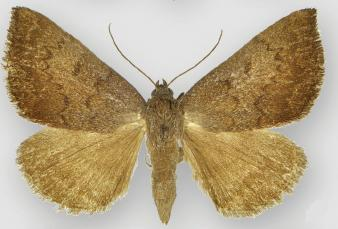

Scientific classification
- Kingdom: Animalia
- Phylum: Arthropoda
- Class: Insecta
- Order: Lepidoptera
- Superfamily: Noctuoidea
- Family: Erebidae
- Genus: Argyrostrotis
- Species: A. erasa

Binomial name
- Argyrostrotis erasa (Guenée, 1852

Synonyms
- Poaphila erasa Guenée, 1852

= Argyrostrotis erasa =

Erasa chocolate moth

Species of moth

Argyrostrotis erasa, the erasa chocolate moth, is a moth of the family Noctuidae. The species was first described by Achille Guenée in 1852.) It is found in the US from North Carolina south to Florida and Texas.

The wingspan is about 30 mm.
