= Ophisma exuleata =

Scientific classification
- Kingdom: Animalia
- Phylum: Arthropoda
- Class: Insecta
- Order: Lepidoptera
- Superfamily: Noctuoidea
- Family: Erebidae
- Genus: Ophisma
- Species: O. exuleata

Binomial name
- Ophisma exuleata Möschler, 1883

Synonyms
- Ophisma esculeata

Species of moth

Ophisma exuleata is a moth of the family Erebidae. It is found in Africa, including South Africa.
