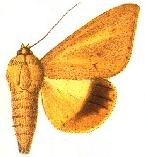

Scientific classification
- Kingdom: Animalia
- Phylum: Arthropoda
- Class: Insecta
- Order: Lepidoptera
- Superfamily: Noctuoidea
- Family: Erebidae
- Genus: Ophisma
- Species: O. gravata

Binomial name
- Ophisma gravata Guenée, 1852

Synonyms
- Ophiusa gravata Guenée, 1852; Ophisma pallens (Lucas, 1893); Grammodes pallens Lucas, 1892

= Ophisma gravata =

Species of moth

Ophisma gravata is a moth of the family Noctuidae first described by Achille Guenée in 1852. It is found from the Indo-Australian tropics of India, Sri Lanka, to Okinawa, Taiwan, the Caroline Islands, New Guinea, eastern Australia and New Caledonia.

== Description ==
Its wingspan is about 60 mm. Males without large tufts on the legs. Hindwings are not crimson or orange as other species. Body pale reddish brown. Forewings with an indistinct straight erect medial pale line with dark inner edge. A slightly curved dark postmedial line and very obscure sub-marginal line can be seen. Cilia white at tips. Hindwings brownish ochreous with a submarginal fuscous black band which is very wide at apex.

The larvae feed on Polygonum species.

== Subspecies ==
- Ophisma gravata gravata Guenée, 1852 (Indo-Australian tropics to Okinawa, the Caroline Is. and New Guinea)
- Ophisma gravata pallens (Lucas, 1892) (eastern Australia and New Caledonia)
