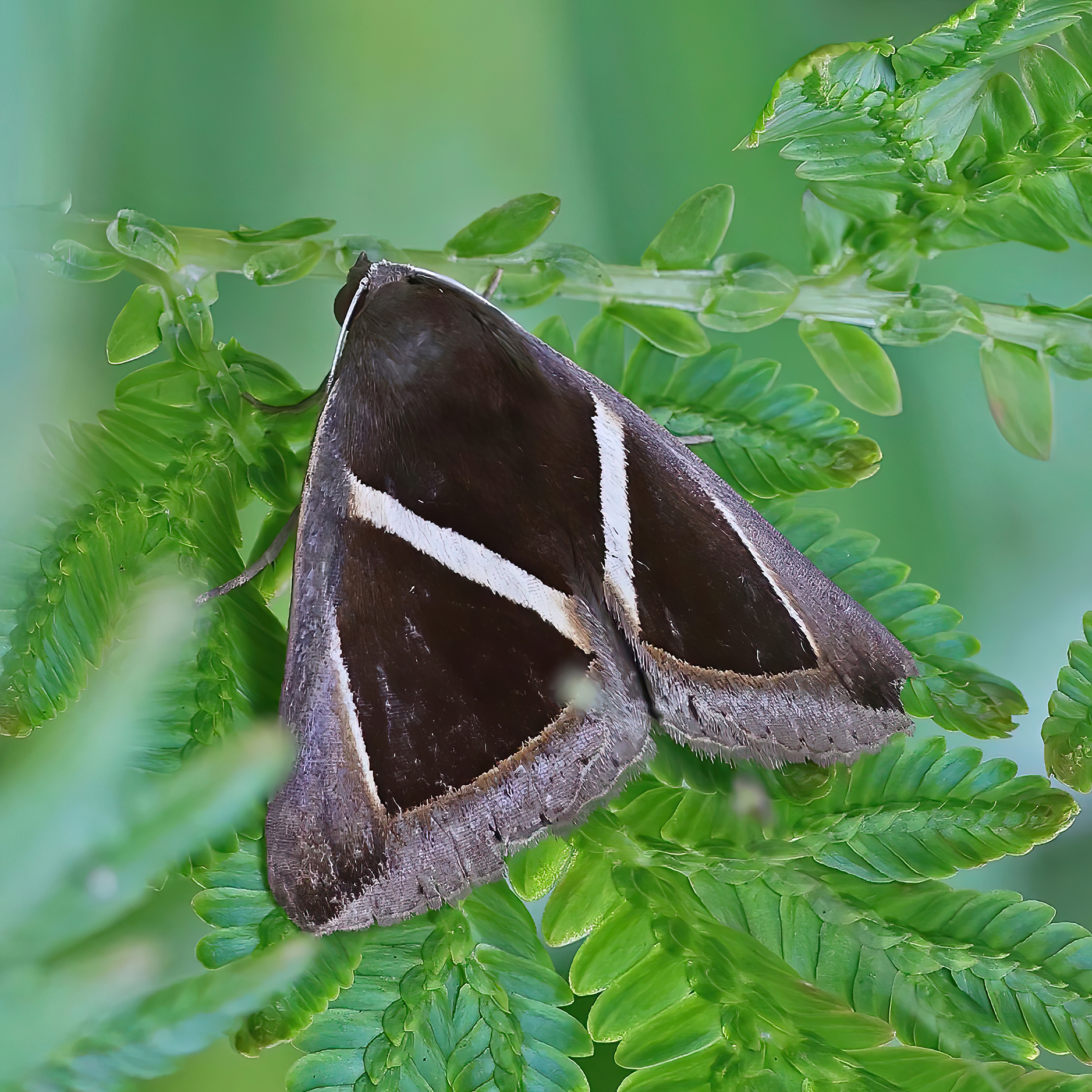

Scientific classification
- Domain: Eukaryota
- Kingdom: Animalia
- Phylum: Arthropoda
- Class: Insecta
- Order: Lepidoptera
- Superfamily: Noctuoidea
- Family: Erebidae
- Genus: Chalciope
- Species: C. mygdon

Binomial name
- Chalciope mygdon (Cramer, 1777)

Synonyms
- Grammodes mygdon Hampson, 1777; Noctua mygdon Cramer, 1777; Noctua triangulum Fabricius, 1787; Chalciope mygdonias Hübner, 1823; Chalciope triangulum (Fabricius, 1787)

= Chalciope mygdon =

Triangular-striped moth

Species of moth

Chalciope mygdon, the triangular-striped moth, is a moth of the family Noctuidae. The species was first described by Pieter Cramer in 1777. It is found from the Oriental region to Sundaland.

== Description ==
Its wingspan is about 36–40 mm. Head and thorax dark red brown. Abdomen greyish fuscous. Forewings purplish grey. Costa ochreous. A large red-brown patch occupying the white wing except the costal and outer area, and crossed by an oblique ochreous band. Its costal and outer edges bordered by reddish ochreous, and their angle almost joined by a red-brown streak from the apex. There is a sub-marginal specks series present. Hindwings fuscous. Cilia grey below apex and at outer angle.

Larva is a very slender pale bluish-grey semi-looper. Fine darker longitudinal lines present. The larvae feed on Phyllanthus species.
