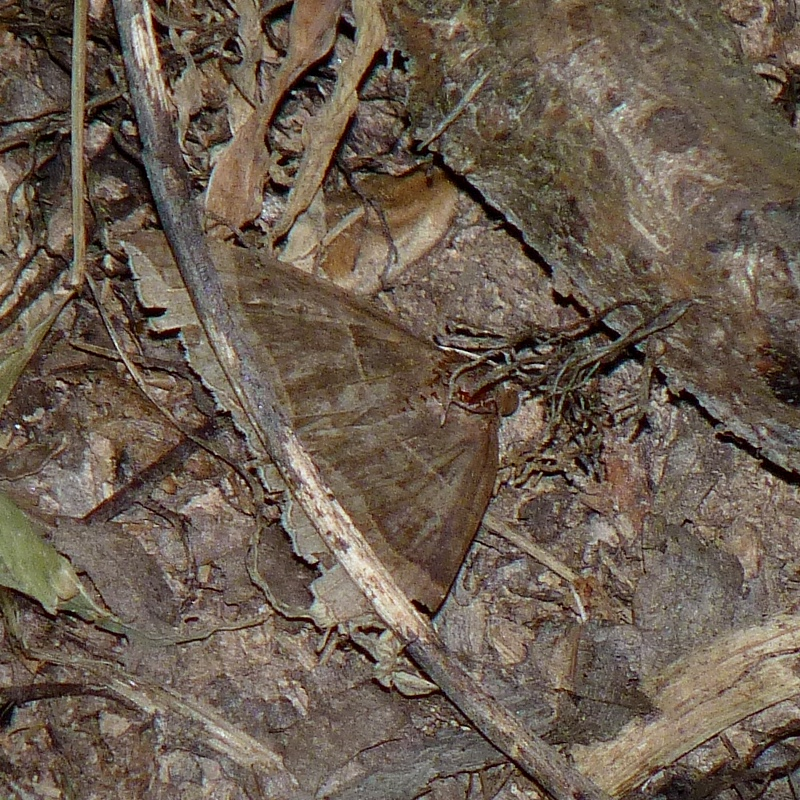
- Parallelia bistriaris

Scientific classification
- Kingdom: Animalia
- Phylum: Arthropoda
- Clade: Pancrustacea
- Class: Insecta
- Order: Lepidoptera
- Superfamily: Noctuoidea
- Family: Erebidae
- Subfamily: Erebinae
- Tribe: Poaphilini
- Genus: Parallelia; Hübner, 1818

= Parallelia =

Genus of moths

Parallelia is a genus of moths in the family Erebidae. The genus was erected by Jacob Hübner in 1818.

== Taxonomy ==
Research by Jeremy Daniel Holloway and Scott E. Miller (2003) suggests that this should be a monotypic genus, with Parallelia bistriaris as the only species. A number of species have been moved to other genera, but some were retained in Parallelia until a suitable genus is found.

== Species ==
- Parallelia bistriaris Hübner, 1818 – maple looper moth

== Temporarily places here ==
- Parallelia aviceps (Warren, 1915)
- Parallelia conspicua (Warren, 1915)
- Parallelia cuneilineata (Warren, 1915)
- Parallelia curvilimes (Warren, 1915)
