= Ophisma albitermia =

Scientific classification
- Kingdom: Animalia
- Phylum: Arthropoda
- Class: Insecta
- Order: Lepidoptera
- Superfamily: Noctuoidea
- Family: Erebidae
- Genus: Ophisma
- Species: O. albitermia

Binomial name
- Ophisma albitermia (Hampson, 1910)

Synonyms
- Ophiusa albitermia Hampson, 1910

Species of moth

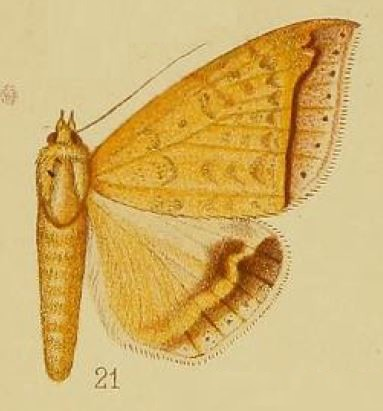
Ophisma albitermia

Ophisma albitermia is a moth of the family Erebidae.

== Distribution ==
It is found in Africa, where it is known from Eritrea and Zambia.
