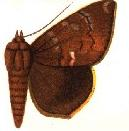

Scientific classification
- Kingdom: Animalia
- Phylum: Arthropoda
- Class: Insecta
- Order: Lepidoptera
- Superfamily: Noctuoidea
- Family: Erebidae
- Genus: Ophisma
- Species: O. pyrosticha

Binomial name
- Ophisma pyrosticha H. Druce, 1912

= Ophisma pyrosticha =

Species of moth

Ophisma pyrosticha is a moth of the family Noctuidae first described by Herbert Druce in 1912. It is found in South America, including Peru.
