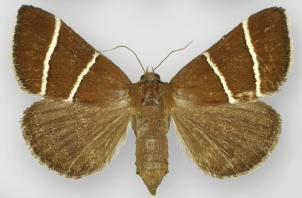

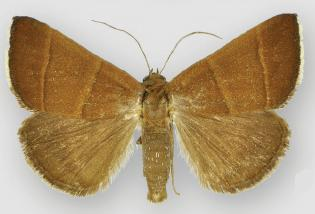

Scientific classification
- Kingdom: Animalia
- Phylum: Arthropoda
- Clade: Pancrustacea
- Class: Insecta
- Order: Lepidoptera
- Superfamily: Noctuoidea
- Family: Erebidae
- Genus: Argyrostrotis
- Species: A. quadrifilaris

Binomial name
- Argyrostrotis quadrifilaris (Hübner, [1831])

Synonyms
- Agronomia quadrifilaris Hübner, [1831]; Poaphila obsoleta Grote, 1876

= Argyrostrotis quadrifilaris =

Species of moth

Argyrostrotis quadrifilaris, the four-lined chocolate moth, is a moth of the family Noctuidae. The species was first described by Jacob Hübner in 1831. It is found in the US from New York and New Hampshire south to Florida and Texas.

The wingspan is about 27 mm.
