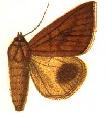

Scientific classification
- Kingdom: Animalia
- Phylum: Arthropoda
- Class: Insecta
- Order: Lepidoptera
- Superfamily: Noctuoidea
- Family: Erebidae
- Genus: Ophisma
- Species: O. teterrima

Binomial name
- Ophisma teterrima Hampson, 1913

= Ophisma teterrima =

Species of moth

Ophisma teterrima is a moth of the family Noctuidae first described by George Hampson in 1913. It is found in Africa, including Nigeria.
