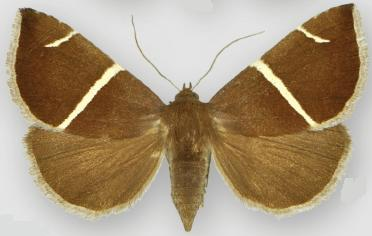

Scientific classification
- Domain: Eukaryota
- Kingdom: Animalia
- Phylum: Arthropoda
- Class: Insecta
- Order: Lepidoptera
- Superfamily: Noctuoidea
- Family: Erebidae
- Genus: Argyrostrotis
- Species: A. anilis

Binomial name
- Argyrostrotis anilis (Drury, 1773)

Synonyms
- Phalaena anilis Drury, 1773; Agronomia sequistriaris Hübner, [1831]; Argyrostrotis sesquistriaris

= Argyrostrotis anilis =

Short-lined chocolate

Species of moth

Argyrostrotis anilis, the short-lined chocolate, is a moth of the family Noctuidae. The species was first described by Dru Drury in 1773. It is found in North America from Quebec and Ontario, down through the eastern United States to Florida and Texas. It is listed as a species of special concern in the state of Connecticut.

The wingspan is about 25 mm.

The larvae feed on Prunus americana.
