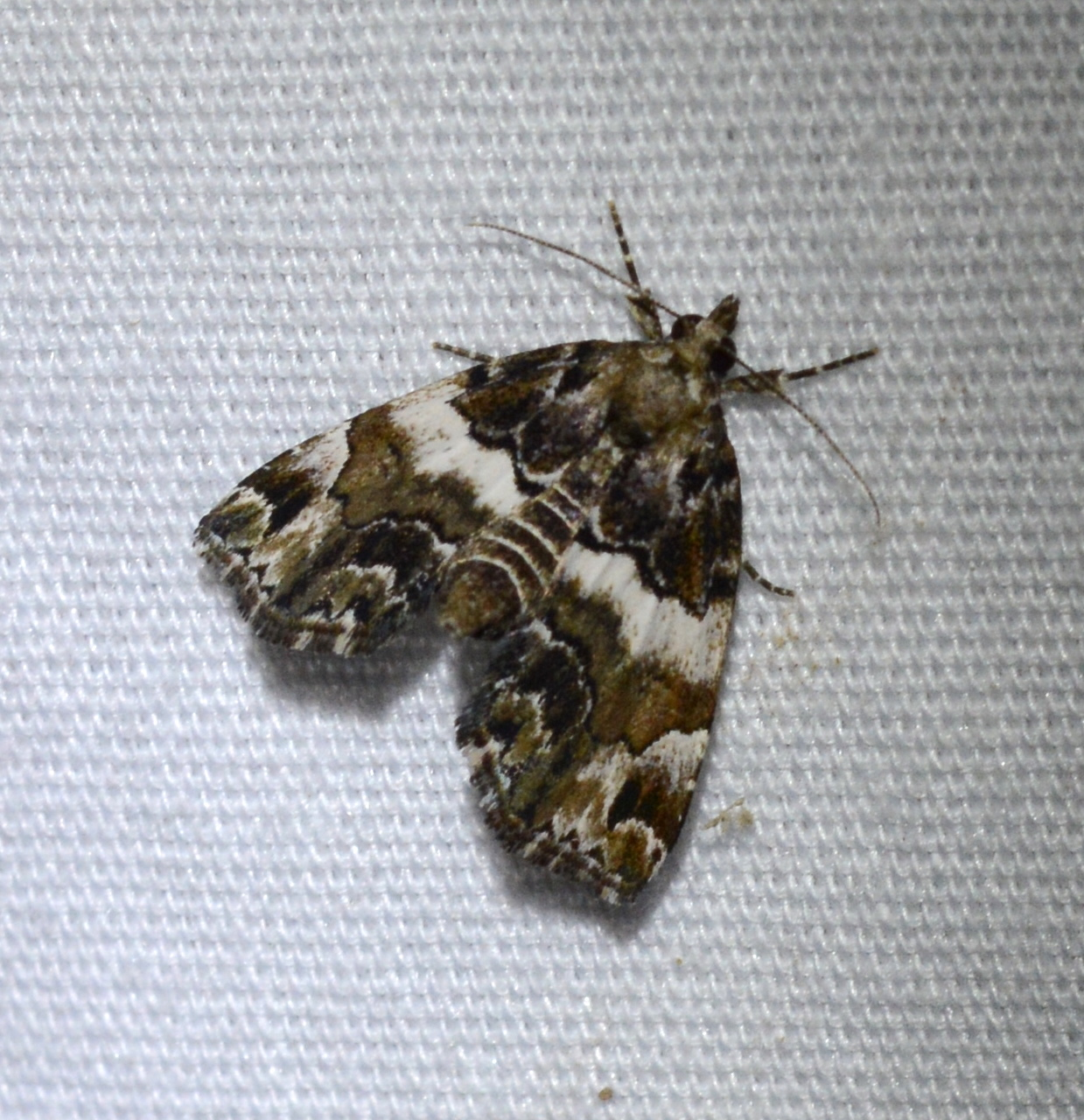

Scientific classification
- Kingdom: Animalia
- Phylum: Arthropoda
- Class: Insecta
- Order: Lepidoptera
- Superfamily: Noctuoidea
- Family: Erebidae
- Genus: Cutina
- Species: C. distincta

Binomial name
- Cutina distincta (Grote, 1883)

= Cutina distincta =

Species of moth

Cutina distincta, known generally as the distinguished cypress owlet or distinct cutina moth, is a species of moth in the family Erebidae. It is found in North America.

The MONA or Hodges number for Cutina distincta is 8729.
