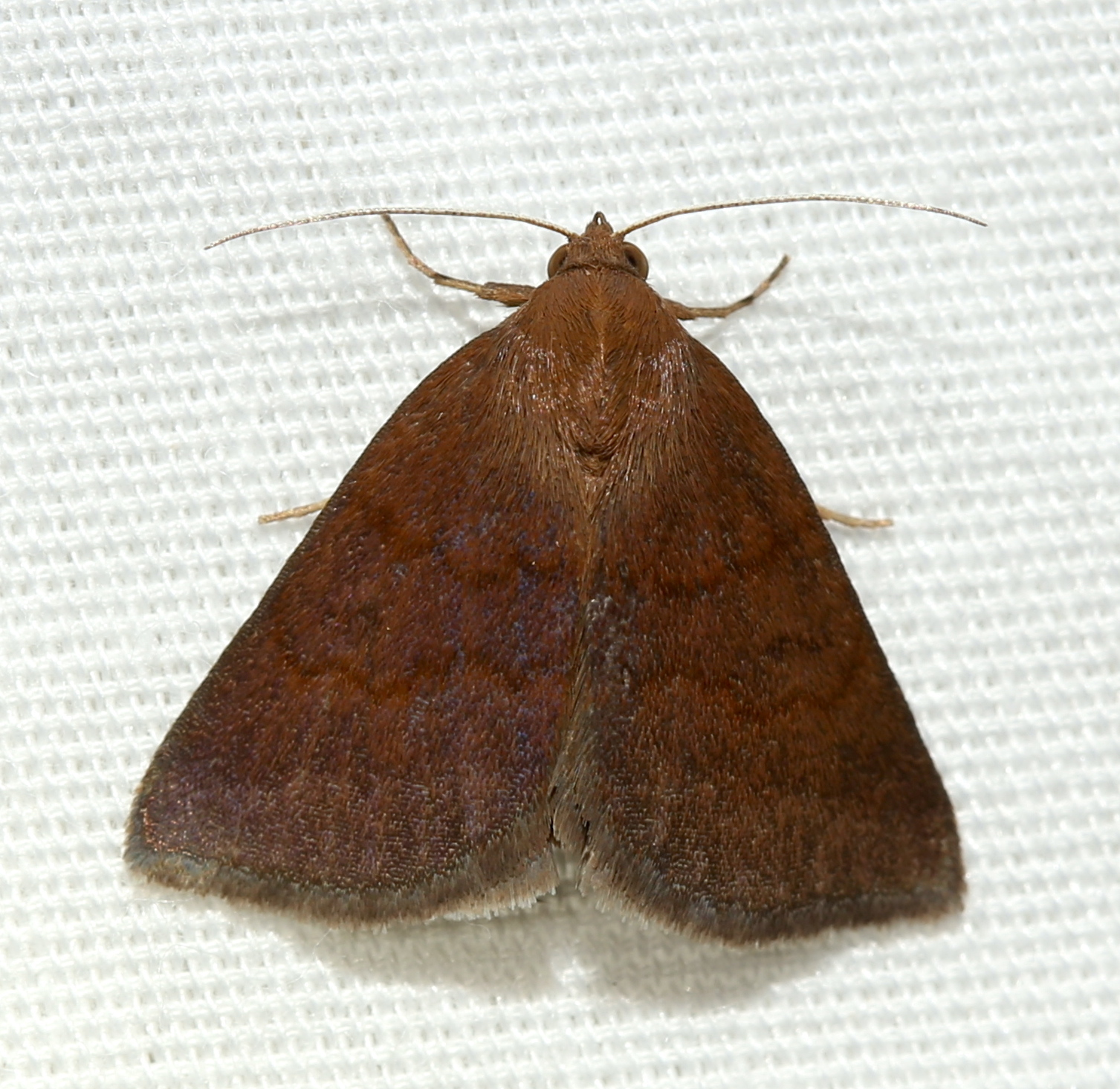

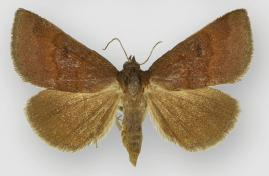

Scientific classification
- Kingdom: Animalia
- Phylum: Arthropoda
- Class: Insecta
- Order: Lepidoptera
- Superfamily: Noctuoidea
- Family: Erebidae
- Genus: Argyrostrotis
- Species: A. deleta

Binomial name
- Argyrostrotis deleta (Guenée, 1852)

Synonyms
- Poaphila deleta Guenée, 1852; Poaphila placata Grote, 1878

= Argyrostrotis deleta =

Species of moth

Argyrostrotis deleta is a moth of the family Noctuidae first described by Achille Guenée in 1852. It is found in the United States from Virginia south to Florida and Texas.

The wingspan is 20–24 mm.
