= Chalciope pusilla =

Scientific classification
- Kingdom: Animalia
- Phylum: Arthropoda
- Class: Insecta
- Order: Lepidoptera
- Superfamily: Noctuoidea
- Family: Erebidae
- Genus: Chalciope
- Species: C. pusilla

Binomial name
- Chalciope pusilla (Holland, 1894)

Synonyms
- Grammodes pusilla Holland, 1894

Species of moth

Chalciope pusilla is a moth of the family Noctuidae first described by William Jacob Holland in 1894. It is found in Gabon and South Africa.
