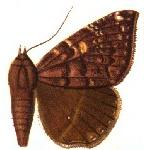

Scientific classification
- Kingdom: Animalia
- Phylum: Arthropoda
- Class: Insecta
- Order: Lepidoptera
- Superfamily: Noctuoidea
- Family: Erebidae
- Genus: Ophisma
- Species: O. fulvipuncta

Binomial name
- Ophisma fulvipuncta Schaus, 1911

= Ophisma fulvipuncta =

Species of moth

Ophisma fulvipuncta is a moth of the family Erebidae. It is found in Costa Rica.
