= Ophisma tropicalis =

Scientific classification
- Kingdom: Animalia
- Phylum: Arthropoda
- Clade: Pancrustacea
- Class: Insecta
- Order: Lepidoptera
- Superfamily: Noctuoidea
- Family: Erebidae
- Genus: Ophisma
- Species: O. tropicalis

Binomial name
- Ophisma tropicalis Guenée, 1852

Synonyms
- Ophisma ardosiata Draudt, 1940; Ophisma bilineata Draudt, 1940; Ophisma confudens Walker 1858; Ophisma crocimacula Guenée, 1852; Ophisma detrahens Walker 1858; Ophisma dimidiata Draudt, 1940; Ophisma fugiens Walker 1858; Ophisma luteiplaga Walker 1858; Ophisma stigmatifera Walker 1858; Ophisma morbillosa Felder & Rogenhofer 1874

Species of moth

Ophisma tropicalis is a moth of the family Erebidae first described by Achille Guenée in 1852. It is found in tropical and subtropical America, from the south of the United States to Uruguay, including Brazil, Guadeloupe, Martinique, Saint Kitts, Montserrat, Saint Vincent, Grenada, the Greater Antilles, Cuba, the Dominican Republic, Jamaica and Colombia.

The larvae feed on Cupania americana.
