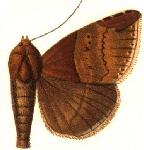

Scientific classification
- Kingdom: Animalia
- Phylum: Arthropoda
- Class: Insecta
- Order: Lepidoptera
- Superfamily: Noctuoidea
- Family: Erebidae
- Genus: Ophisma
- Species: O. nobilis

Binomial name
- Ophisma nobilis Schaus, 1911

= Ophisma nobilis =

Species of moth

Ophisma nobilis is a moth of the family Noctuidae first described by William Schaus in 1911. It is found in Costa Rica.
