= Chalciope erecta =

Scientific classification
- Kingdom: Animalia
- Phylum: Arthropoda
- Class: Insecta
- Order: Lepidoptera
- Superfamily: Noctuoidea
- Family: Erebidae
- Genus: Chalciope
- Species: C. erecta

Binomial name
- Chalciope erecta Hampson, 1902

Synonyms
- Euclidisema erecta (Hampson, 1902)

Species of moth

Chalciope erecta is a moth of the family Noctuidae first described by George Hampson in 1902. It is found in South Africa, Kenya and Somalia.
