= Poaphilini =

- Achaea echo

Scientific classification
- Kingdom: Animalia
- Phylum: Arthropoda
- Class: Insecta
- Order: Lepidoptera
- Superfamily: Noctuoidea
- Family: Erebidae
- Subfamily: Erebinae
- Tribe: Poaphilini; Guenée, 1852

Tribe of moths

The Poaphilini are a tribe of moths in the family Erebidae.

== Taxonomy ==
Phylogenetic studies have shown that the tribe is most closely related to the tribe Ophiusini. Those studies indicate that the genera Achaea, Mimophisma, and Ophisma belong in the Poaphilini despite formerly being classified in the Ophiusini.

== Genera ==
- Achaea
- Allotria
- Argyrostrotis
- Bastilla
- Chalciope
- Cutina
- Focillidia
- Gondysia
- Mimophisma
- Ophisma
- Parallelia
