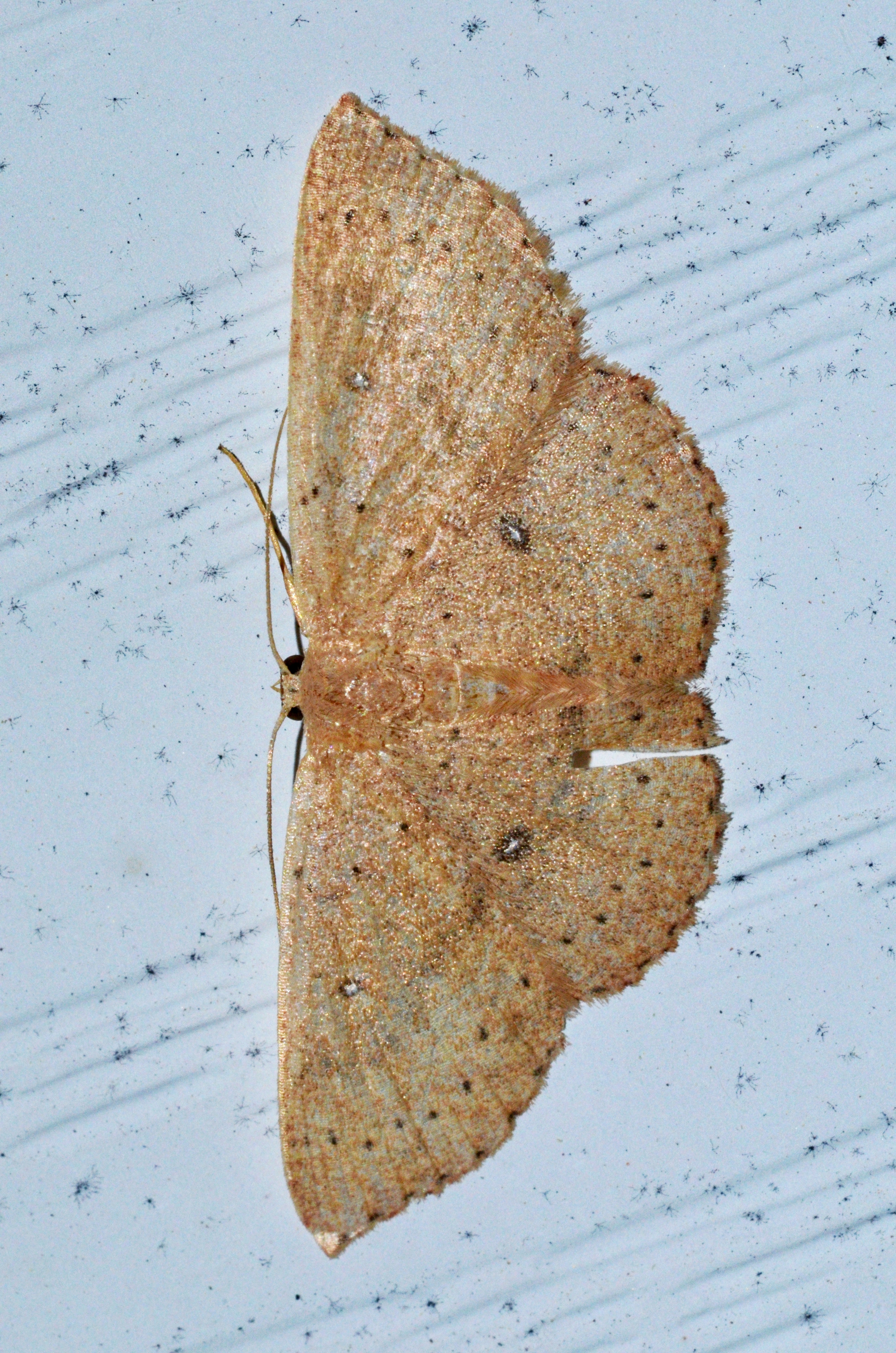
- Cyclophora packardi

Scientific classification
- Kingdom: Animalia
- Phylum: Arthropoda
- Clade: Pancrustacea
- Class: Insecta
- Order: Lepidoptera
- Family: Geometridae
- Subfamily: Sterrhinae
- Tribe: Cosymbiini; Prout, 1911

Genera
- See text

= Cosymbiini =

Tribe of moths

Cosymbiini is a tribe of the geometer moth family (Geometridae), with about 515 species in 11 genera, and 5 genera with 170 species tentatively associated with the tribe.

== Genera ==
- Anisephyra Warren, 1896
- Bytharia Walker, 1865
- Chlorerythra Warren, 1895
- Chrysocraspeda Swinhoe, 1893
- Cyclophora Hubner, 1822 (including Anisodes Guenée, 1858)
- Mesotrophe Hampson, 1893
- Perixera Meyrick, 1886
- Pleuroprucha Moschler, 1890
- Pseudosterrha Warren, 1888
- Ptomophyle Prout, 1932
- Zeugma Walker, 1862

== Uncertain association ==
- Hemipterodes Warren, 1906
- Lipotaxia Prout, 1918
- Prasinochrysa Warren, 1900
- Semaeopus Herrich-Schaffer, 1855
- Trygodes Guenee, 1857

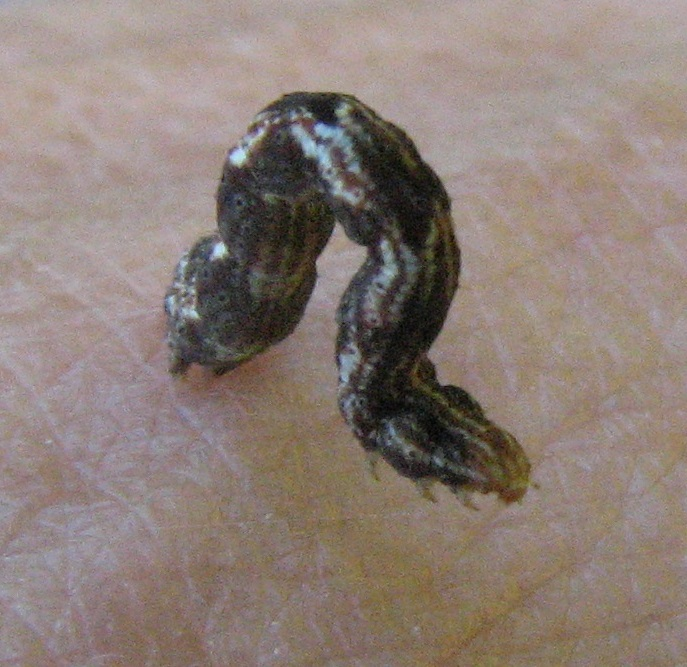
Cyclophora sp. caterpillar
