= Apostasy (disambiguation) =

Apostasy is the formal disaffiliation from, or abandonment or renunciation of, a religion by a person.

- Apostasy in Christianity
- Apostasy in Islam
- Apostasy in Judaism

Apostasy may also refer to:

- Apostasia of 1965 (Apostasy of 1965), often called the Apostacy (Apostasia), a Greek coup
- Apostasy (1948 film), Japanese film by Keisuke Kinoshita
- Apostasy (1979 film), Australian film by Zbigniew Friedrich
- Apostasy (2017 film), 2017 British drama film directed by Daniel Kokotajlo
- Apostasy (band), a Swedish black metal band
- The Apostasy, a 2007 album by Polish band Behemoth

== See also ==
- Apostate (disambiguation)
- Apostasia (disambiguation)
