= Anisephyra ocularia =

Scientific classification
- Kingdom: Animalia
- Phylum: Arthropoda
- Class: Insecta
- Order: Lepidoptera
- Family: Geometridae
- Subfamily: Sterrhinae
- Tribe: Cosymbiini
- Genus: Anisephyra
- Species: A. ocularia

Binomial name
- Anisephyra ocularia (Fabricius, 1775)

Species of moth

Anisephyra ocularia is a species of moth in the family Geometridae. It is found in South and Eastern Asia.
