= Semaeopus cantona =

Scientific classification
- Kingdom: Animalia
- Phylum: Arthropoda
- Class: Insecta
- Order: Lepidoptera
- Family: Geometridae
- Tribe: Cosymbiini
- Genus: Semaeopus
- Species: S. cantona

Binomial name
- Semaeopus cantona (Schaus, 1901)

Species of moth

Semaeopus cantona is a species of geometrid moth in the family Geometridae. It is found in Central America.

The MONA or Hodges number for Semaeopus cantona is 7143.
