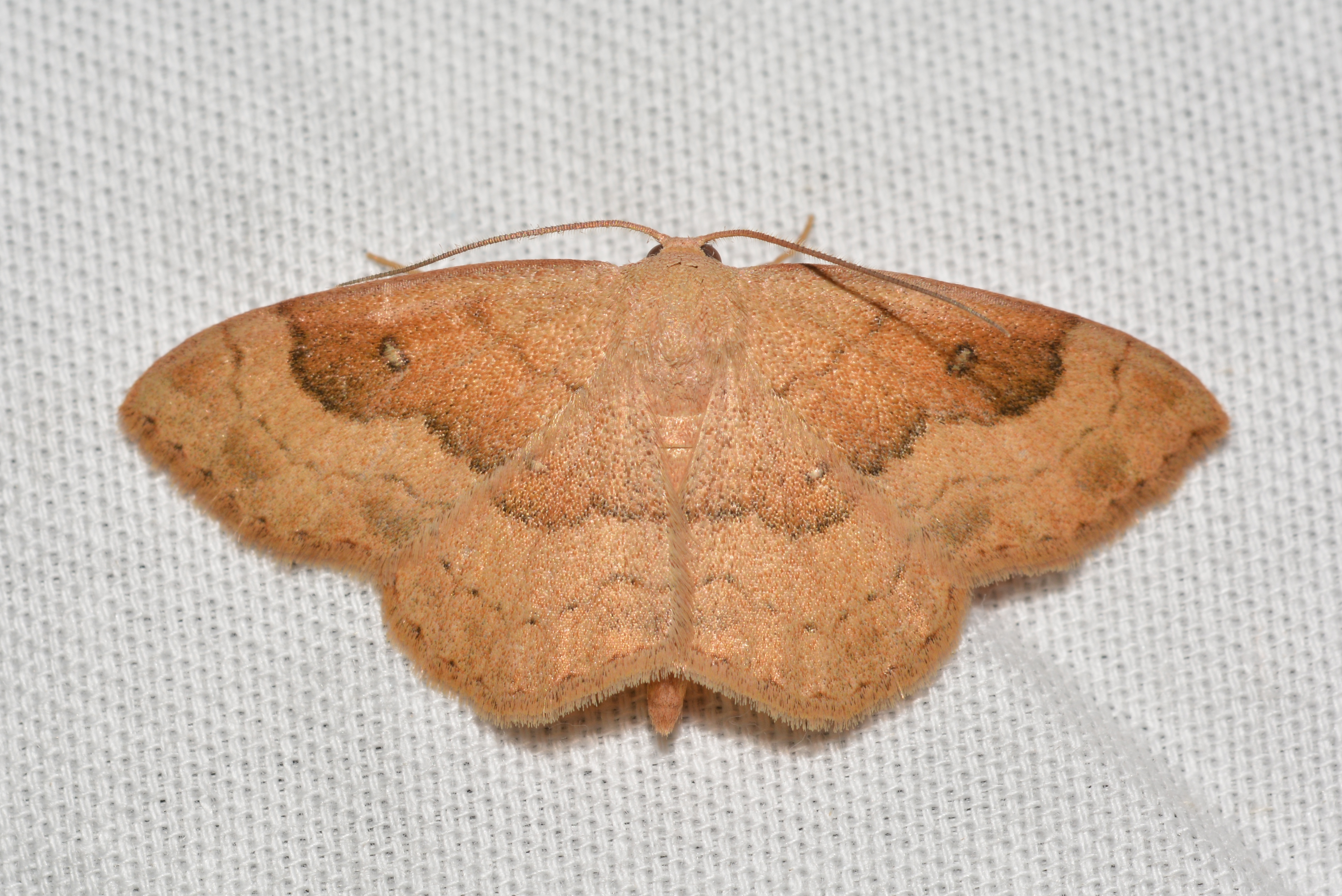

Scientific classification
- Kingdom: Animalia
- Phylum: Arthropoda
- Class: Insecta
- Order: Lepidoptera
- Family: Geometridae
- Tribe: Cosymbiini
- Genus: Semaeopus
- Species: S. gracilata

Binomial name
- Semaeopus gracilata (Grossbeck, 1912)

= Semaeopus gracilata =

Species of moth

Semaeopus gracilata is a species of geometrid moth in the family Geometridae. It is found in North America.

The MONA or Hodges number for Semaeopus gracilata is 7142.
