= Necula =

Necula is a Romanian surname. Notable people with the name include:

- Cătălin Necula (born 1969), Romanian footballer
- Dorin Necula (born 1943), Romanian footballer
- Emilian Necula (born 1960), Romanian rugby union player
- George Necula, Romanian computer scientist
- Iulia Necula (born 1986), Romanian table tennis player
- Răducanu Necula (born 1946), Romanian footballer
- Rebeca Necula (born 2003), Romanian handball player
- Veronica Necula (born 1967), Romanian rower

== See also ==
- Tricentra necula, a species of moth
