= Apostate (disambiguation) =

An apostate is one who renounces their religion.

Apostate or Apostates may also refer to:

== Literature ==
- The Apostate, a story by Jack London
- The Apostate, a novel by Vladimir Lidin
- The Apostate (play), a play by Richard Lalor Sheil

== Music ==
- The Apostate (album), a 2016 musical release
- "The Apostate", a song by Swans from the 2012 album The Seer
- "The Apostate", a song by Rotting Christ from the 2024 album Pro Xristoy

== Film and television ==
- The Apostate (film), a 2015 Uruguayan film
- "Chapter 17: The Apostate", an episode of The Mandalorian

== Biology ==
- Apostates (plant), a genus of flowering plants in the daisy family
- Apostates (moth), a genus of geometer moths

== See also ==
- Apostasy (disambiguation)
