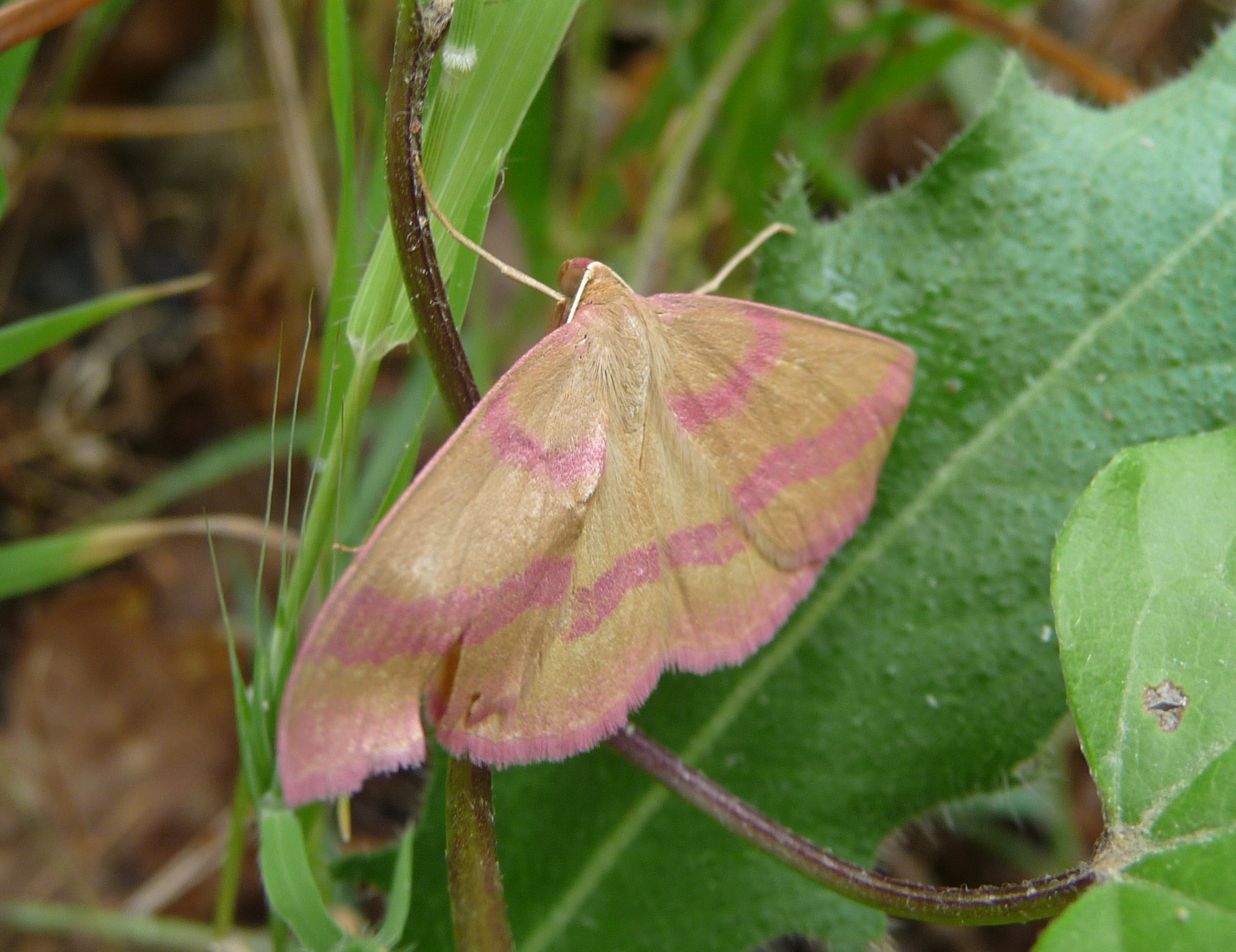
- Rhodostrophia calabra

Scientific classification
- Kingdom: Animalia
- Phylum: Arthropoda
- Clade: Pancrustacea
- Class: Insecta
- Order: Lepidoptera
- Family: Geometridae
- Tribe: Rhodostrophiini
- Genus: Rhodostrophia; Hübner, [1823]

= Rhodostrophia =

Genus of moths

Rhodostrophia is a genus of moths in the family Geometridae erected by Jacob Hübner in 1823.

== Species ==
- Rhodostrophia abcisaria Brandt, 1941
- Rhodostrophia acidaria Staudinger, 1892
- Rhodostrophia adauctata Staudinger, 1892
- Rhodostrophia anjumana Wiltshire, 1967
- Rhodostrophia anomala Warren, 1895
- Rhodostrophia auctata Staudinger, 1887
- Rhodostrophia badiaria (Freyer, 1841)
- Rhodostrophia bahara Brandt, 1938
- Rhodostrophia bicolor Warren, 1895
- Rhodostrophia bisinuata Warren, 1895
- Rhodostrophia calabra (Petagna, 1786)
- Rhodostrophia cretacearia Rebel, 1916
- Rhodostrophia cuprinaria Christoph, 1887
- Rhodostrophia dispar Staudinger, 1892
- Rhodostrophia ferruginaria (Blanchard, 1852)
- Rhodostrophia glaucofusa (Hampson 1907)
- Rhodostrophia inconspicua Butler, 1886
- Rhodostrophia jacularia (Hübner, 1813)
- Rhodostrophia lanceolata Kaila & Viidalepp, 1996
- Rhodostrophia olivacea Warren, 1895
- Rhodostrophia philolaches (Oberthür, 1891)
- Rhodostrophia praecisaria Staudinger, 1892
- Rhodostrophia pudorata (Fabricius, 1794)
- Rhodostrophia rueckbeili Sheljuzhko, 1955
- Rhodostrophia serraginaria Kaila & Viidalepp, 1996
- Rhodostrophia sieversi Christoph, 1882
- Rhodostrophia staudingeri Erschov, 1874
- Rhodostrophia tabidaria Zeller, 1847
- Rhodostrophia terrestraria Lederer, 1869
- Rhodostrophia vastaria Christoph, 1887
- Rhodostrophia vibicaria (Clerck, 1759)
- Rhodostrophia xesta Prout, 1924
