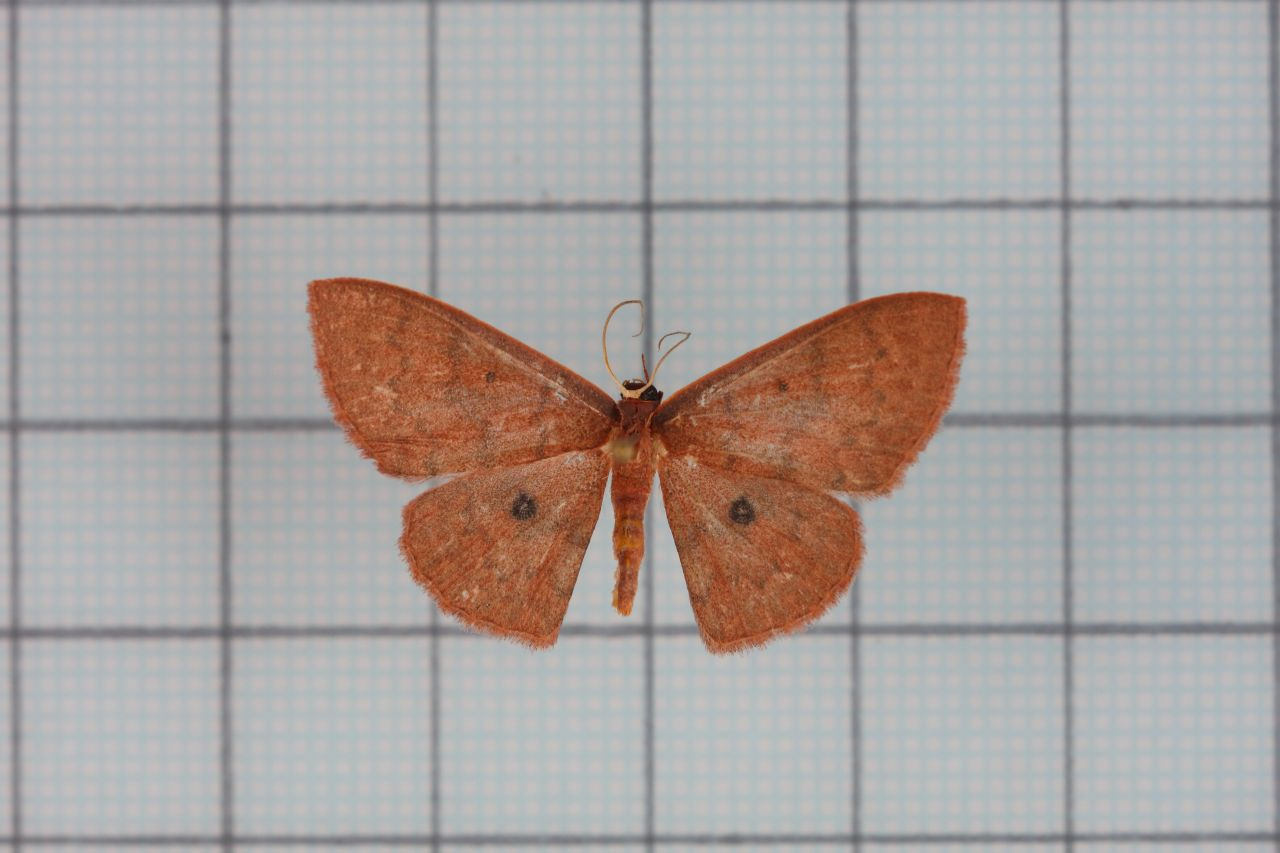
- Organopoda carnearia

Scientific classification
- Kingdom: Animalia
- Phylum: Arthropoda
- Class: Insecta
- Order: Lepidoptera
- Family: Geometridae
- Tribe: Rhodostrophiini
- Genus: Organopoda; Hampson, 1893

= Organopoda =

Genus of moths

Organopoda is a genus of moths in the family Geometridae first described by George Hampson in 1893.

== Description ==
The antennae of the male are serrate (saw-tooth shaped) and fasciculate (bundled). Forewings with vein 10 given off from veins 7, 8 and 9 anastomosing (fusing) with vein 11, and then again with veins 8 and 9 to form a double areole. Hind tibia of male much aborted and modified as a sensory organ. A large tuft of long hair from base of tibia, the distal portion of which is much modified in shape and has only the terminal spur pairs. The inner spur taking the form of a hollow vesicle which is black inside, with an aperture near its base. The first two joints of tarsi bent, and produced outwards into a thin curved corneous (horn-like) wing, forming a shield overlying and protecting the modified spur, the terminal joint of tarsus and ungues very minute.

== Species ==
- Organopoda acerbata Prout, 1938 Peninsular Malaysia, Borneo
- Organopoda acmaea Prout, 1938 Peninsular Malaysia, Sumatra, Borneo
- Organopoda acutula Cui, Xue & Jiang 2019 China
- Organopoda annulifera (Butler, 1889) India, China
- Organopoda atrisparsaria Wehrli, 1924 China
- Organopoda brevipalpis Prout, 1926 Myanmar, China
- Organopoda carnearia (Walker, 1861) Sri Lanka, India, China
- Organopoda cnecosticta Prout, 1932 Borneo
- Organopoda deltaformis Cui, Xue & Jiang 2019 China
- Organopoda hadra Prout, 1938 Papua New Guinea
- Organopoda megiste Cui, Xue & Jiang 2019 China
- Organopoda olivescens Warren, 1896 Papua New Guinea, Australia
- Organopoda orbata Warren, 1907 Papua New Guinea
- Organopoda perorbata Prout, 1937 Bali, Borneo
- Organopoda subbrunnea Warren, 1897 Indonesia
