= Chrysocraspeda aurantibasis =

Scientific classification
- Kingdom: Animalia
- Phylum: Arthropoda
- Clade: Pancrustacea
- Class: Insecta
- Order: Lepidoptera
- Family: Geometridae
- Genus: Chrysocraspeda
- Species: C. aurantibasis

Binomial name
- Chrysocraspeda aurantibasis (Herbulot, 1970)

Synonyms
- Ptochophyle aurantibasis Herbulot, 1970

Species of moth

Chrysocraspeda aurantibasis is a species of moth of the family Geometridae. It is found in North Madagascar.

The length of the forewings is 9mm.

The holotype had been collected at the route d'Anosibe, Ampitameloka, altitude 840 m.
