= Tanaotrichia =

Scientific classification
- Domain: Eukaryota
- Kingdom: Animalia
- Phylum: Arthropoda
- Class: Insecta
- Order: Lepidoptera
- Family: Geometridae
- Tribe: Rhodostrophiini
- Genus: Tanaotrichia

Genus of moths

Tanaotrichia is a genus of moths in the family Geometridae.
