= Mesotrophe alienaria =

Scientific classification
- Kingdom: Animalia
- Phylum: Arthropoda
- Class: Insecta
- Order: Lepidoptera
- Family: Geometridae
- Genus: Mesotrophe
- Species: M. alienaria

Binomial name
- Mesotrophe alienaria (Walker, 1863)

Synonyms
- Anisodes alienaria Walker, 1863; Cyclophora alienaria

Species of moth

Mesotrophe alienaria is a moth in the family Geometridae. It is found on Borneo, Peninsular Malaysia and Sumatra. The habitat consists of lowland areas.
