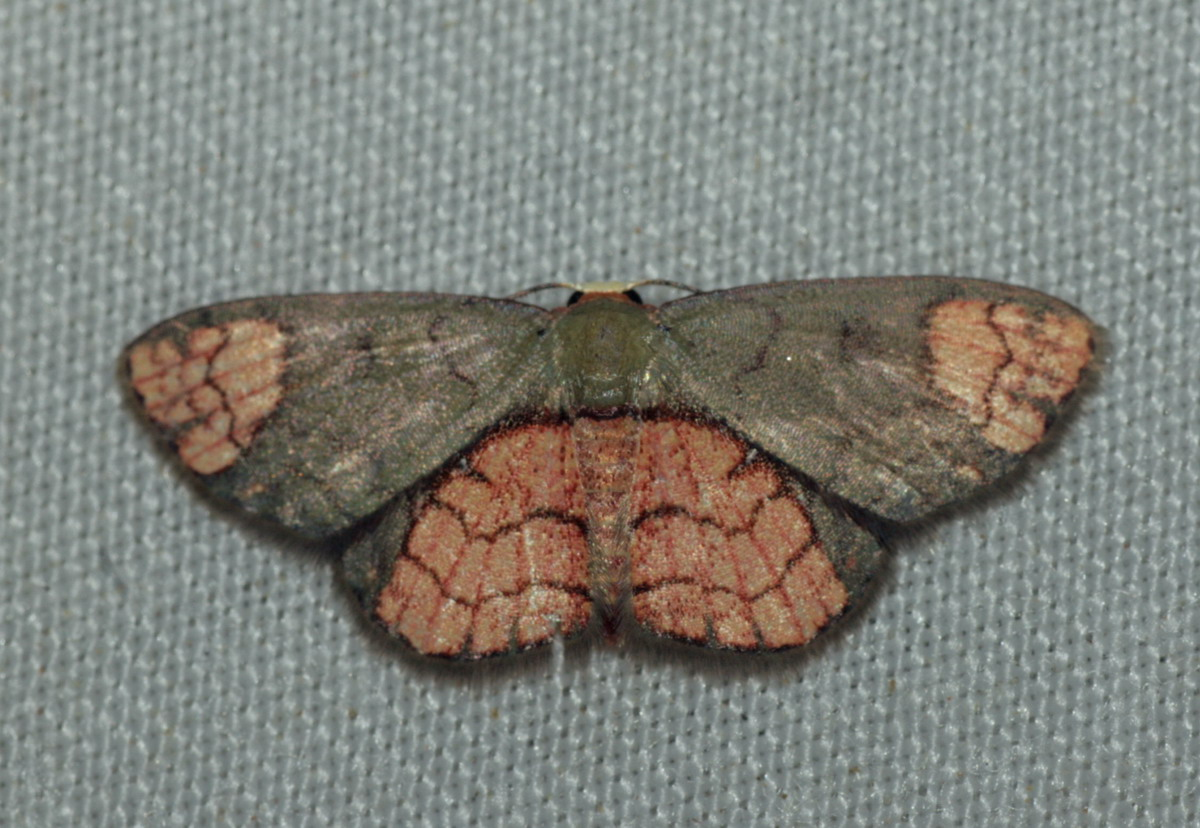
- Borneo, Crocker Range National Park

Scientific classification
- Kingdom: Animalia
- Phylum: Arthropoda
- Clade: Pancrustacea
- Class: Insecta
- Order: Lepidoptera
- Family: Geometridae
- Genus: Metallaxis
- Species: M. semiustus

Binomial name
- Metallaxis semiustus (C. Swinhoe, 1894)

Synonyms
- Erithrolophus semiustus C. Swinhoe, 1894; Erythrolophus semiustus C. Swinhoe, 1894

= Metallaxis semiustus =

Species of moth

Metallaxis semiustus is a species of moth in the family Geometridae. It was first described by Charles Swinhoe in 1894. It is known from Northeast India (type locality: Cherrapunji) and from Borneo.

== Description ==
The wingspan is about 25 mm (1 in). The wings have contrasting grey and pale orange areas.
