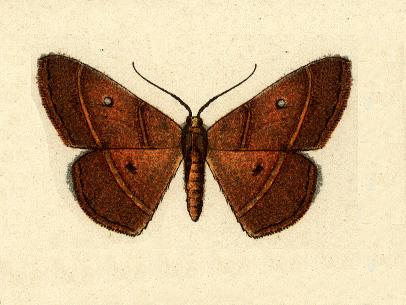

Scientific classification
- Kingdom: Animalia
- Phylum: Arthropoda
- Clade: Pancrustacea
- Class: Insecta
- Order: Lepidoptera
- Family: Geometridae
- Genus: Semaeopus
- Species: S. callichroa

Binomial name
- Semaeopus callichroa L. B. Prout, 1938

= Semaeopus callichroa =

Species of moth

Semaeopus callichroa is a moth of the family Geometridae first described by Louis Beethoven Prout in 1938. It is found on Jamaica.
