= Chrysocraspeda corallina =

Scientific classification
- Kingdom: Animalia
- Phylum: Arthropoda
- Class: Insecta
- Order: Lepidoptera
- Family: Geometridae
- Genus: Chrysocraspeda
- Species: C. corallina

Binomial name
- Chrysocraspeda corallina (Herbulot, 1970)

Synonyms
- Ptochophyle corallina Herbulot, 1970

Species of moth

Chrysocraspeda corallina is a species of moth of the family Geometridae. It is found in North Madagascar.

The length of the forewings is 16 mm (female). The holotype had been collected in the Massif du Tsaratanana, altitude 2500 m.
