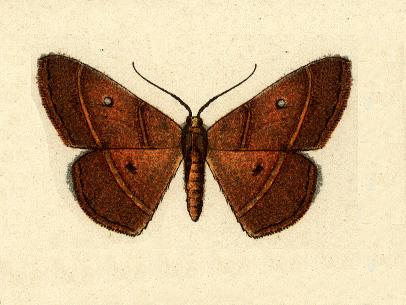
- Semaeopus callichroa

Scientific classification
- Kingdom: Animalia
- Phylum: Arthropoda
- Class: Insecta
- Order: Lepidoptera
- Family: Geometridae
- Tribe: Cosymbiini
- Genus: Semaeopus; Herrich-Schäffer, [1855]

Synonyms
- Charommataea Hulst, 1896; Cnemodes Guenée, 1858; Cyphopteryx Guenée, 1858; Dasycosymbia Grossbeck, 1912; Dichromatopodia Warren, 1895; Dysephyra Warren, 1895; Issa Walker, 1867; Ligonia Möschler, 1881; Paradmeta Warren, 1907; Parazeuxis Warren, 1907; Schistocolpia Warren, 1906; Xenostigma Warren, 1900

= Semaeopus =

Genus of moths

Semaeopus is a genus of moths in the family Geometridae erected by Gottlieb August Wilhelm Herrich-Schäffer in 1855.

== Species ==
- Semaeopus argocosma
- Semaeopus callichroa
- Semaeopus cantona
- Semaeopus castaria
- Semaeopus ella
- Semaeopus gracilata
- Semaeopus indignaria
- Semaeopus marginata
- Semaeopus vincentii
