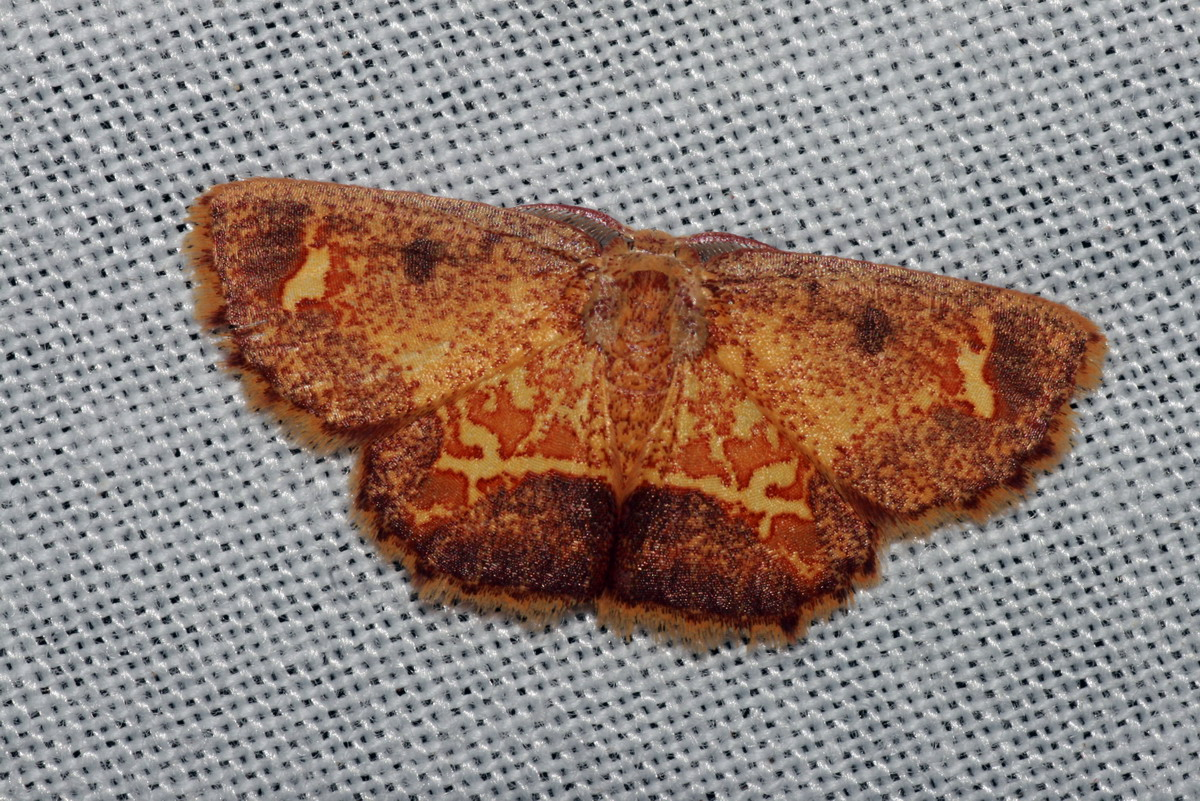

Scientific classification
- Kingdom: Animalia
- Phylum: Arthropoda
- Clade: Pancrustacea
- Class: Insecta
- Order: Lepidoptera
- Family: Geometridae
- Genus: Chrysocraspeda
- Species: C. ozophanes

Binomial name
- Chrysocraspeda ozophanes L. B. Prout, 1918

Synonyms
- Ptochophyle ozophanes Prout, 1918

= Chrysocraspeda ozophanes =

Species of moth

Chrysocraspeda ozophanes is a species of moth in the family Geometridae first described by Louis Beethoven Prout in 1918. It is found in Peninsular Malaysia and Borneo.
