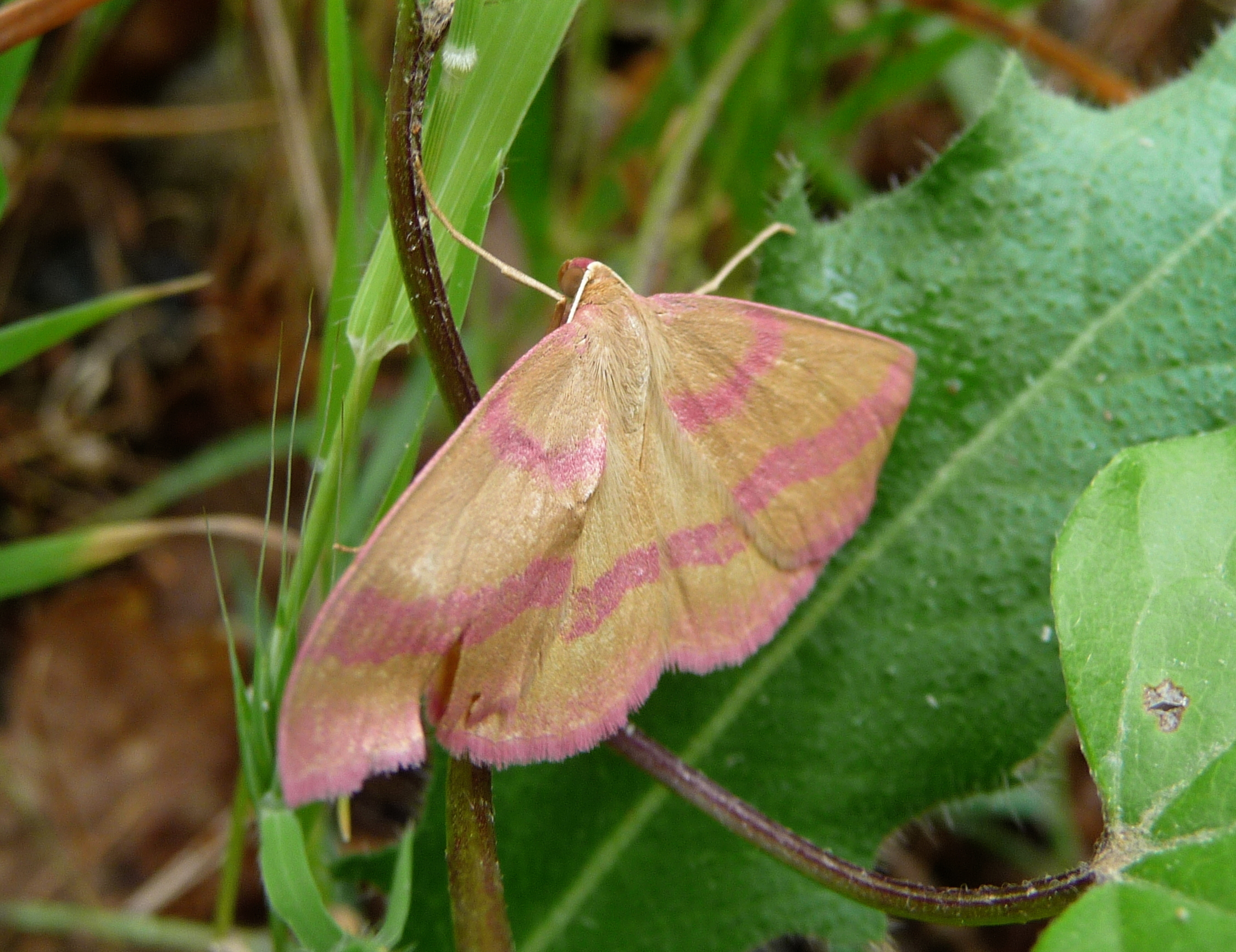

Scientific classification
- Kingdom: Animalia
- Phylum: Arthropoda
- Clade: Pancrustacea
- Class: Insecta
- Order: Lepidoptera
- Family: Geometridae
- Genus: Rhodostrophia
- Species: R. calabra

Binomial name
- Rhodostrophia calabra (Petagna, 1786)

Synonyms
- Phalaena calabra Petagna, 1786; Phalaena calabraria Hübner, 1790; Phalaena trifasciata Cyrillo, 1787; Aspilates taeniaria Freyer, 1834; Rhodostrophia calabraria var. muscosa Bastelberger, 1908

= Rhodostrophia calabra =

Species of moth

Rhodostrophia calabra is a moth of the family Geometridae first described by Vincenzo Petagna in 1786. It is found from the Iberian Peninsula and a small isolated population in Morocco, through southern France, the western and southern Alps, Italy, the eastern coast of the Adriatic Sea to the southern parts of the Balkan Peninsula. In central Europe it is only found as an isolated population in central France and Rheinland-Pfalz. It is not found on the islands in the Mediterranean Sea (Corsica, Sardinia, the Balearic Islands, Sicily and Crete). In the Balkans there is an isolated population in the border region of northern Bulgaria and Serbia. Furthermore, it is present on the eastern shores of the Black Sea in Turkey and in the Caucasus.

The wingspan is 28–33 mm for males and 28–35 mm for females. The moths fly in one generation from May to June.

The larvae feed on various Fabaceae species, including Cytisus scoparius, Genista (mainly Genista tinctoria), Dorycnium, Scabiosa, Rumex, Polygonum, Thymus and Asperula.

== Subspecies ==
- Rhodostrophia calabra calabra
- Rhodostrophia calabra separata (Iberian Peninsula, North Africa)
- Rhodostrophia calabra transcaucasica (Caucasus, Turkey)
