= Pseudosterrha =

Scientific classification
- Kingdom: Animalia
- Phylum: Arthropoda
- Class: Insecta
- Order: Lepidoptera
- Family: Geometridae
- Tribe: Cosymbiini
- Genus: Pseudosterrha; Warren, 1888

Genus of moths

Pseudosterrha is a genus of moths in the family Geometridae described by Warren in 1888.

== African species ==
- Pseudosterrha colettae (Hausmann, 2006)
- Pseudosterrha paulula (Swinhoe, 1886)
- Pseudosterrha rufistrigata (Hampson, 1896)
