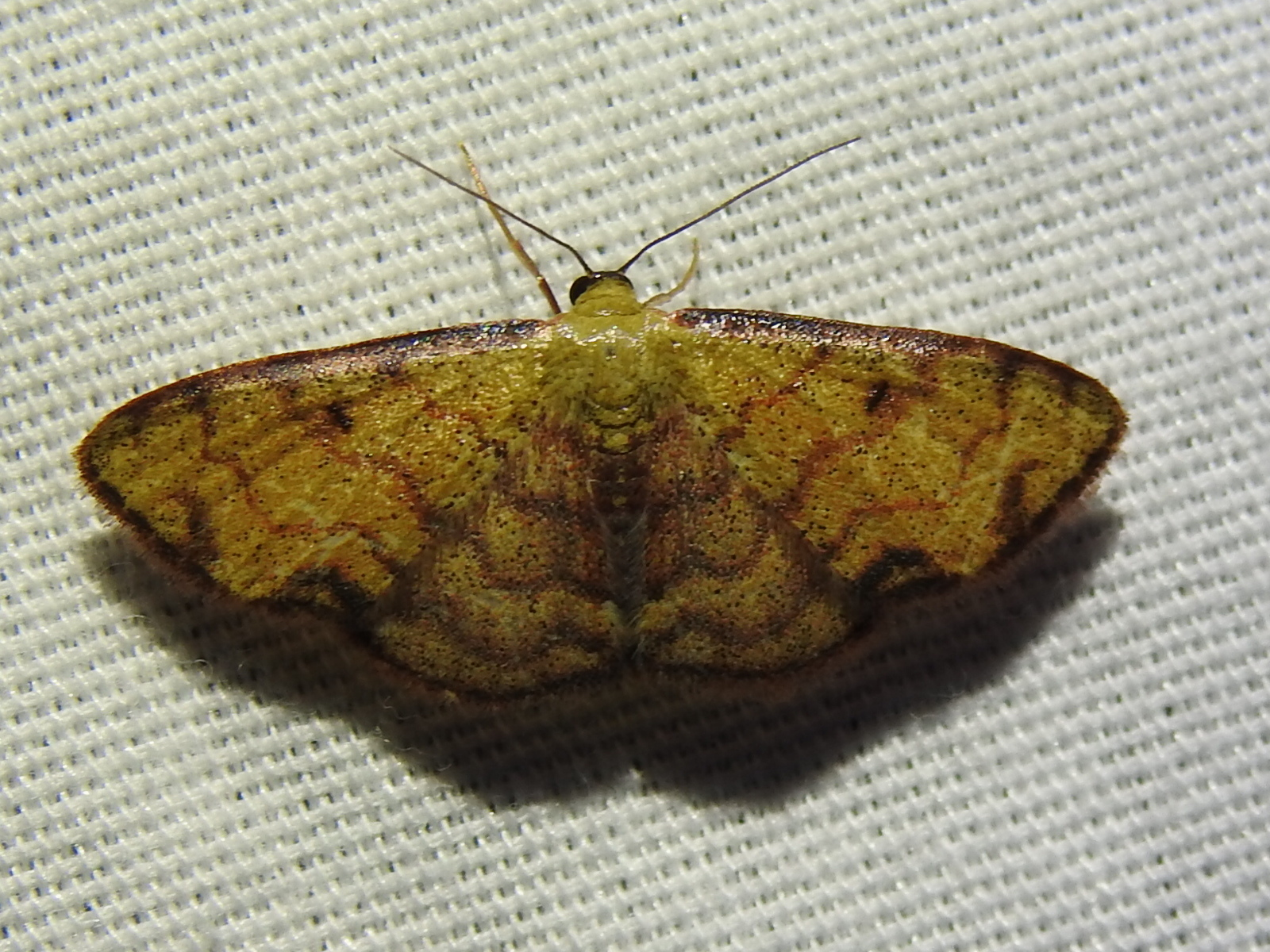

Scientific classification
- Kingdom: Animalia
- Phylum: Arthropoda
- Clade: Pancrustacea
- Class: Insecta
- Order: Lepidoptera
- Family: Geometridae
- Genus: Semaeopus
- Species: S. marginata

Binomial name
- Semaeopus marginata (Schaus, 1901)

= Semaeopus marginata =

Species of moth

Semaeopus marginata is a species of geometrid moth in the family Geometridae. It is found in Central America.
