= Palaeaspilates =

Scientific classification
- Kingdom: Animalia
- Phylum: Arthropoda
- Class: Insecta
- Order: Lepidoptera
- Family: Geometridae
- Tribe: Rhodostrophiini
- Genus: Palaeaspilates; Warren, 1894

Synonyms
- Anisephyra Warren, 1896 (disputed)

Genus of moths

Palaeaspilates is a genus of moths in the family Geometridae. The genus was described by Warren in 1894.

== Species ==
- Palaeaspilates carnea (Warren, 1914)
- Palaeaspilates inoffensa Warren, 1894
- Palaeaspilates reducta (Wiltshire, 1981)
- Palaeaspilates sublutearia (Wiltshire, 1977)
