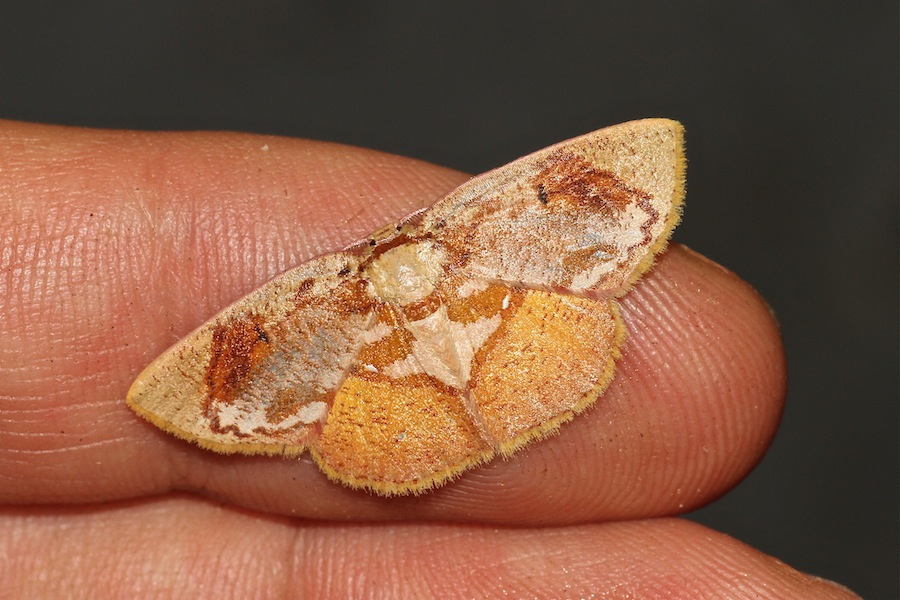
- Chrysocraspeda plumbeofusa from Borneo

Scientific classification
- Domain: Eukaryota
- Kingdom: Animalia
- Phylum: Arthropoda
- Class: Insecta
- Order: Lepidoptera
- Family: Geometridae
- Tribe: Cosymbiini
- Genus: Chrysocraspeda; C. Swinhoe, 1893

Synonyms
- Heteroctenis Prout, 1916; Chrysocraspeda Hampson, 1895; Chrysolene Warren, 1897; Ptochophyle Warren, 1896

= Chrysocraspeda =

Genus of moths

Chrysocraspeda is a genus of moths in the family Geometridae described by Charles Swinhoe in 1893.

== Description ==
Palpi minute and hardly reaching the frons. Forewings with vein 3 from before angle of cell. Veins 7, 8, 9, 10 and 11 stalked. Hindwings with veins 3 and 4 from angle of cell or on a short stalk.

== Species ==
- Chrysocraspeda abdominalis Herbulot, 1984
- Chrysocraspeda abhadraca Walker, 1861
- Chrysocraspeda albidisca Warren, 1907
- Chrysocraspeda altegradia Prout, 1931
- Chrysocraspeda ambolosy Viette, 1978
- Chrysocraspeda ambrensis Viette, 1970
- Chrysocraspeda anala Viette, 1970
- Chrysocraspeda analiplaga Warren, 1907
- Chrysocraspeda anamale Viette, 1970
- Chrysocraspeda angulosa Herbulot, 1970
- Chrysocraspeda anisocosma Prout, 1918
- Chrysocraspeda anosibe Viette, 1978
- Chrysocraspeda anthocroca Prout, 1925
- Chrysocraspeda apicirubra Prout, 1917
- Chrysocraspeda apseogramma Prout, 1932
- Chrysocraspeda argentimacula Holloway, 1997
- Chrysocraspeda aurantibasis Herbulot, 1970
- Chrysocraspeda aurimargo Warren, 1897
- Chrysocraspeda auristigma Prout, 1918
- Chrysocraspeda autarces Prout, 1938
- Chrysocraspeda baderi Herbulot, 1987
- Chrysocraspeda bradyspila Prout, 1934
- Chrysocraspeda cadorelae Herbulot, 1999
- Chrysocraspeda callichroa Prout, 1934
- Chrysocraspeda callima Bethune-Baker, 1915
- Chrysocraspeda cambogiodes Prout, 1916
- Chrysocraspeda carioni Viette, 1972
- Chrysocraspeda charites Oberthür, 1916
- Chrysocraspeda comptaria C. Swinhoe, 1902
- Chrysocraspeda concentrica Warren, 1899
- Chrysocraspeda conspicuaria C. Swinhoe, 1905
- Chrysocraspeda convergens Holloway, 1997
- Chrysocraspeda conversata Walker, 1861
- Chrysocraspeda corallina Herbulot, 1970
- Chrysocraspeda cosymbia Viette, 1983
- Chrysocraspeda croceomarginata Warren, 1896
- Chrysocraspeda cruoraria Warren, 1897
- Chrysocraspeda crypsaurea Bastelberger, 1908
- Chrysocraspeda cyphosticha Turner, 1908
- Chrysocraspeda dargei Herbulot, 1978
- Chrysocraspeda definita Prout, 1922
- Chrysocraspeda deltalutea Holloway, 1997
- Chrysocraspeda dilucida Warren, 1897
- Chrysocraspeda dinawa Bethune-Baker, 1915
- Chrysocraspeda dipyramida Prout, 1918
- Chrysocraspeda dischista Prout, 1938
- Chrysocraspeda dollmani Prout, 1932
- Chrysocraspeda doricaria C. Swinhoe, 1904
- Chrysocraspeda dracontias Meyrick, 1897
- Chrysocraspeda dramaturgia Holloway, 1997
- Chrysocraspeda dubiefi Viette, 1978
- Chrysocraspeda dujardini Viette, 1972
- Chrysocraspeda dysmothauma Prout, 1932
- Chrysocraspeda eclipsis Prout, 1932
- Chrysocraspeda elaeophragma Prout, 1917
- Chrysocraspeda erythraria Mabille, 1893
- Chrysocraspeda eumeles Turner, 1936
- Chrysocraspeda euryodia Prout, 1918
- Chrysocraspeda eutmeta Prout, 1916
- Chrysocraspeda exitela Prout, 1918
- Chrysocraspeda faganaria Guenée, 1858
- Chrysocraspeda flavimacula Prout, 1916
- Chrysocraspeda flavimedia Prout, 1916
- Chrysocraspeda flavipuncta Warren, 1899
- Chrysocraspeda flavisparsa Prout, 1916
- Chrysocraspeda fruhstorferi Prout, 1938
- Chrysocraspeda fulviplaga C. Swinhoe, 1905
- Chrysocraspeda gibbosa Warren, 1896
- Chrysocraspeda gnamptoloma Prout, 1925
- Chrysocraspeda herbuloti Viette, 1970
- Chrysocraspeda heringi Prout, 1932
- Chrysocraspeda hiaraka Viette, 1978
- Chrysocraspeda hilaris Warren, 1898
- Chrysocraspeda hyalotypa Prout, 1932
- Chrysocraspeda ignita Warren, 1907
- Chrysocraspeda indopurpurea Prout, 1916
- Chrysocraspeda innotata Warren, 1896
- Chrysocraspeda inornata Warren, 1896
- Chrysocraspeda iole C. Swinhoe, 1892
- Chrysocraspeda jabaina Viette, 1978
- Chrysocraspeda juriae Holloway, 1997
- Chrysocraspeda kastilla Expósito, 2006
- Chrysocraspeda kenricki Prout, 1925
- Chrysocraspeda lakato Viette, 1978
- Chrysocraspeda leighata Warren, 1904
- Chrysocraspeda leucotoca Prout, 1938
- Chrysocraspeda lilacina Warren, 1903
- Chrysocraspeda lineata Warren, 1896
- Chrysocraspeda lunulata C. Swinhoe, 1902
- Chrysocraspeda madecassa Viette, 1972
- Chrysocraspeda marginata Warren, 1897
- Chrysocraspeda medioplaga C. Swinhoe, 1902
- Chrysocraspeda miniosa Warren, 1899
- Chrysocraspeda mitigata Walker, 1861
- Chrysocraspeda moramanga Viette, 1978
- Chrysocraspeda nasuta Prout, 1934
- Chrysocraspeda nebulifera Prout, 1920
- Chrysocraspeda neurina Prout, 1934
- Chrysocraspeda nigribasalis Warren, 1909
- Chrysocraspeda niobe Viette, 1970
- Chrysocraspeda notata Warren, 1896
- Chrysocraspeda olearia Guenée, 1858
- Chrysocraspeda oophora Prout, 1916
- Chrysocraspeda ophthalmica Viette, 1983
- Chrysocraspeda orana Viette, 1978
- Chrysocraspeda orgalea Meyrick, 1897
- Chrysocraspeda orthogramma Prout, 1925
- Chrysocraspeda ozophanes Prout, 1918
- Chrysocraspeda pagon Holloway, 1997
- Chrysocraspeda peristoecha Prout, 1925
- Chrysocraspeda permutans Hampson, 1891
- Chrysocraspeda perpicta Warren, 1896
- Chrysocraspeda phaedra Prout, 1918
- Chrysocraspeda phanoptica Prout, 1934
- Chrysocraspeda philoterpes Prout, 1938
- Chrysocraspeda phlogea Prout, 1938
- Chrysocraspeda phrureta Prout, 1938
- Chrysocraspeda planaria C. Swinhoe, 1904
- Chrysocraspeda planctogramma Prout, 1938
- Chrysocraspeda plumbeofusa C. Swinhoe, 1894
- Chrysocraspeda polyniphes Prout, 1925
- Chrysocraspeda porphyrochlamys Prout, 1931
- Chrysocraspeda praegriseata Warren, 1907
- Chrysocraspeda prouti Bethune-Baker, 1915
- Chrysocraspeda pryeri Holloway, 1997
- Chrysocraspeda ptolegens Viette, 1972
- Chrysocraspeda pulverulenta Warren, 1897
- Chrysocraspeda remutans Prout, 1938
- Chrysocraspeda rosina Warren, 1898
- Chrysocraspeda rothschildi Warren, 1903
- Chrysocraspeda rubida C. Swinhoe, 1904
- Chrysocraspeda rubraspersa Holloway, 1997
- Chrysocraspeda rubricata C. Swinhoe, 1903
- Chrysocraspeda rubripennis Warren, 1898
- Chrysocraspeda sanguinea Warren, 1896
- Chrysocraspeda sanguinipuncta C. Swinhoe, 1902
- Chrysocraspeda saturniina Viette, 1972
- Chrysocraspeda semiocellata Prout, 1916
- Chrysocraspeda silvatica Viette, 1970
- Chrysocraspeda sogai Viette, 1970
- Chrysocraspeda sparsipuncta Viette, 1970
- Chrysocraspeda strigata Warren, 1902
- Chrysocraspeda subangulata Warren, 1896
- Chrysocraspeda subdefinita Viette, 1970
- Chrysocraspeda subminiosa Prout, 1932
- Chrysocraspeda tanala Herbulot, 1999
- Chrysocraspeda tantale Viette, 1970
- Chrysocraspeda tigrina Meyrick, 1897
- Chrysocraspeda tricolora Bethune-Baker, 1915
- Chrysocraspeda tristicula C. Swinhoe, 1886
- Chrysocraspeda truncipennis Prout, 1938
- Chrysocraspeda uncimargo Warren, 1907
- Chrysocraspeda vadoni Viette, 1972
- Chrysocraspeda vinosa Prout, 1918
- Chrysocraspeda virgata West, 1930
- Chrysocraspeda vitrata Herbulot, 1965
- Chrysocraspeda vola Viette, 1970
- Chrysocraspeda volutaria C. Swinhoe, 1886
- Chrysocraspeda volutisignata Prout, 1925
- Chrysocraspeda zaphleges Prout, 1925
- Chrysocraspeda zearia C. Swinhoe, 1904
- Chrysocraspeda zombensis Prout, 1932
