= Chrysocraspeda tristicula =

Scientific classification
- Domain: Eukaryota
- Kingdom: Animalia
- Phylum: Arthropoda
- Class: Insecta
- Order: Lepidoptera
- Family: Geometridae
- Genus: Chrysocraspeda
- Species: C. tristicula

Binomial name
- Chrysocraspeda tristicula (Swinhoe, 1885)

Synonyms
- Ptochophyle tristicula Swinhoe, 1885; Asthena tristicula Swinhoe, 1885; Ptochophyle laeta Warren, 1899

Species of moth

Chrysocraspeda tristicula is a moth of the family Geometridae first described by Swinhoe in 1885. It is found in Sri Lanka. India, Myanmar, Borneo, Philippines and Sumbawa.

Pale greyish banded on fawn of wings. A broad marginal band found on both wings, which is interrupted by fawn bands.
