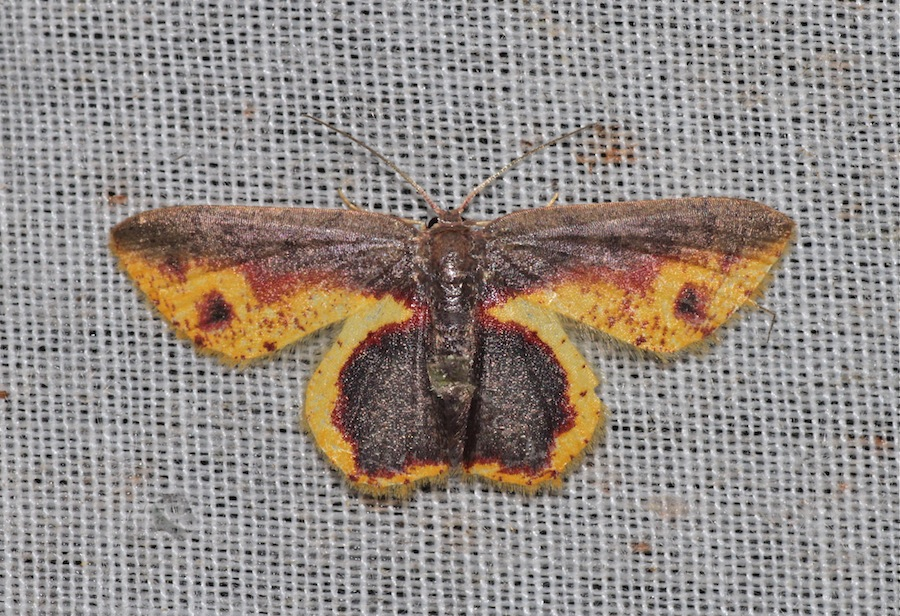
- From dipterocarp forest on Mount Trusmadi, Borneo,

Scientific classification
- Kingdom: Animalia
- Phylum: Arthropoda
- Class: Insecta
- Order: Lepidoptera
- Family: Geometridae
- Genus: Chrysocraspeda
- Species: C. mitigata

Binomial name
- Chrysocraspeda mitigata Walker, 1861

Synonyms
- Hyria mitigata Walker, 1861

= Chrysocraspeda mitigata =

Species of moth

Chrysocraspeda mitigata is a species of moth in the family Geometridae first described by Francis Walker in 1861. It is found in India, Myanmar and Borneo.
