= Chrysocraspeda convergens =

Scientific classification
- Kingdom: Animalia
- Phylum: Arthropoda
- Clade: Pancrustacea
- Class: Insecta
- Order: Lepidoptera
- Family: Geometridae
- Genus: Chrysocraspeda
- Species: C. convergens

Binomial name
- Chrysocraspeda convergens Holloway, 1997

Species of moth

Chrysocraspeda convergens is a species of moth in the family Geometridae first described by Jeremy Daniel Holloway in 1997. It is endemic to Borneo.
