= Anisephyra =

Scientific classification
- Kingdom: Animalia
- Phylum: Arthropoda
- Class: Insecta
- Order: Lepidoptera
- Family: Geometridae
- Tribe: Cosymbiini
- Genus: Anisephyra; Warren, 1896

Genus of geometer moths

Anisephyra is a genus of moths in the family Geometridae. It was previously considered a synonym of Palaeaspilates.

== Species ==
- Anisephyra ocularia (Fabricius, 1775)
- Anisephyra rufaria Warren, 1896
