= Semaeopus ella =

Scientific classification
- Kingdom: Animalia
- Phylum: Arthropoda
- Class: Insecta
- Order: Lepidoptera
- Family: Geometridae
- Genus: Semaeopus
- Species: S. ella

Binomial name
- Semaeopus ella (Hulst, 1896)

Species of moth

Semaeopus ella is a species of geometrid moth in the family Geometridae. It is found in North America.

The MONA or Hodges number for Semaeopus ella is 7141.

== Subspecies ==
These two subspecies belong to the species Semaeopus ella:

- Semaeopus ella ella
- Semaeopus ella ellatina Hulst, 1896
