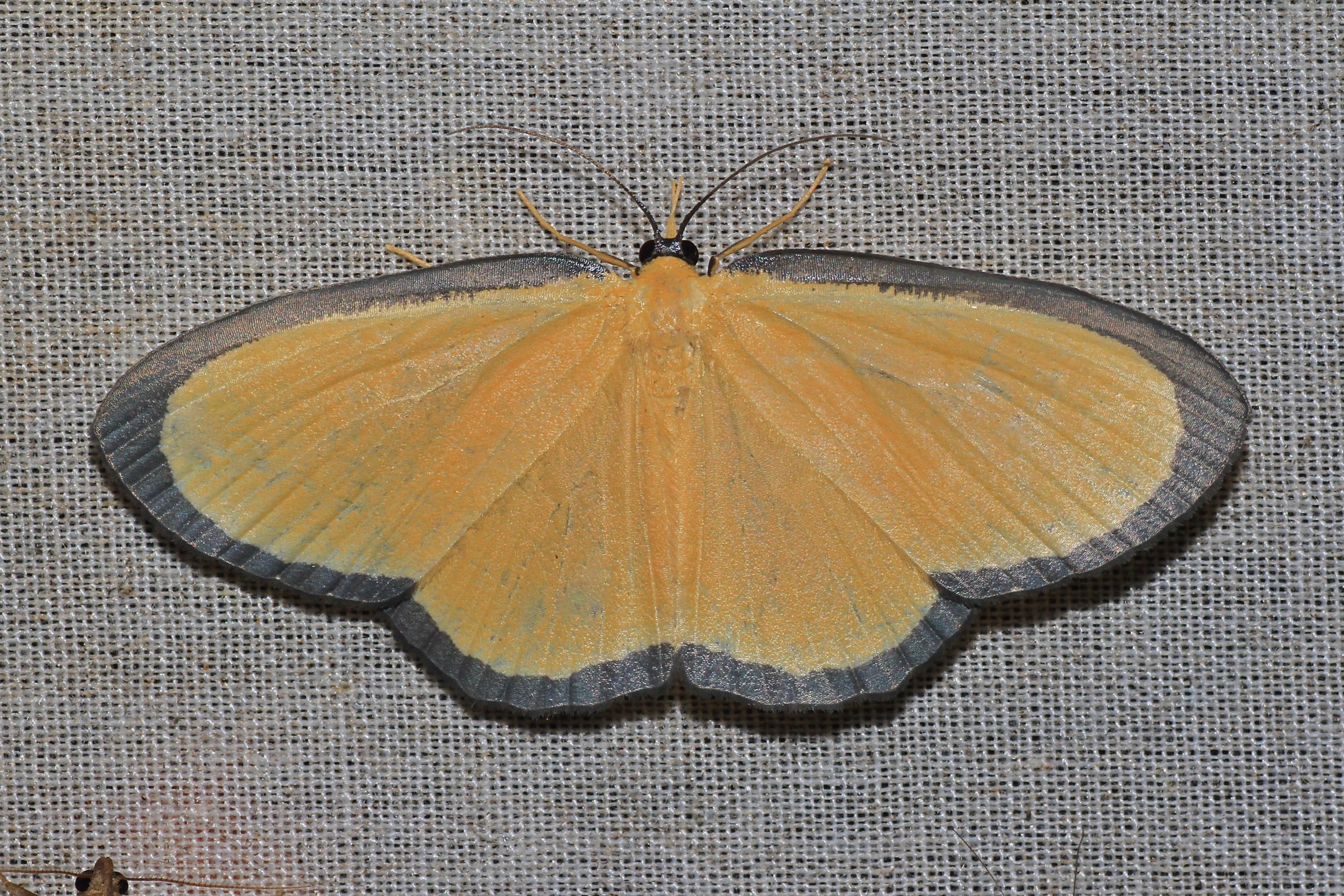
- Bytharia uniformis in Mount Trusmadi, Borneo, lowland mixed dipterocarp forest

Scientific classification
- Kingdom: Animalia
- Phylum: Arthropoda
- Class: Insecta
- Order: Lepidoptera
- Family: Geometridae
- Tribe: Cosymbiini
- Genus: Bytharia; Walker, 1865

Type species
- Bytharia marginata Walker, 1864

Synonyms
- Longipalpa Pagenstecher, 1900; Silvaspica Schultze, 1925

= Bytharia =

Genus of moths

Bytharia is a genus of moths in the family Geometridae erected by Francis Walker in 1865. The species which are relatively large for subfamily Sterrhinae and are characterized by pale yellow wings with uniform gray margins and, on the forewing, gray along the costa.

== Species ==
- Bytharia angusticincta Prout, 1920
- Bytharia atrimargo Warren, 1896
- Bytharia baletensis Schultze, 1925
- Bytharia circumdata Swinhoe, 1902
- Bytharia circumducta Pagenstecher, 1900
- Bytharia latimargo Warren
- Bytharia lucida Warren, 1899
- Bytharia marginata Walker, 1864
- Bytharia uniformis Swinhoe, 1902
