= Chrysocraspeda zearia =

Scientific classification
- Kingdom: Animalia
- Phylum: Arthropoda
- Class: Insecta
- Order: Lepidoptera
- Family: Geometridae
- Genus: Chrysocraspeda
- Species: C. zearia

Binomial name
- Chrysocraspeda zearia C. Swinhoe, 1904

Species of moth

Chrysocraspeda zearia is a species of moth of the family Geometridae first described by Charles Swinhoe in 1904. It is found on Madagascar.

This species has a wingspan of 25 millimetres (0.98 in).
