= Metallaxis amandae =

Scientific classification
- Kingdom: Animalia
- Phylum: Arthropoda
- Clade: Pancrustacea
- Class: Insecta
- Order: Lepidoptera
- Family: Geometridae
- Genus: Metallaxis
- Species: M. amandae

Binomial name
- Metallaxis amandae Holloway, 1997

Species of moth

Metallaxis amandae is a species of moth of the family Geometridae. It is found in Borneo in lower montane forest. Its ground colour is grey with pale markings.
