= Apostegania =

Scientific classification
- Kingdom: Animalia
- Phylum: Arthropoda
- Clade: Pancrustacea
- Class: Insecta
- Order: Lepidoptera
- Family: Geometridae
- Subfamily: Sterrhinae
- Tribe: Rhodostrophiini
- Genus: Apostegania; Prout, 1932

Genus of geometer moths

Apostegania is a genus of moths in the family Geometridae.

There are two species assigned to this genus:

- Apostegania crina (Swinhoe, 1892)
- Apostegania rectilineata (Swinhoe, 1906)
