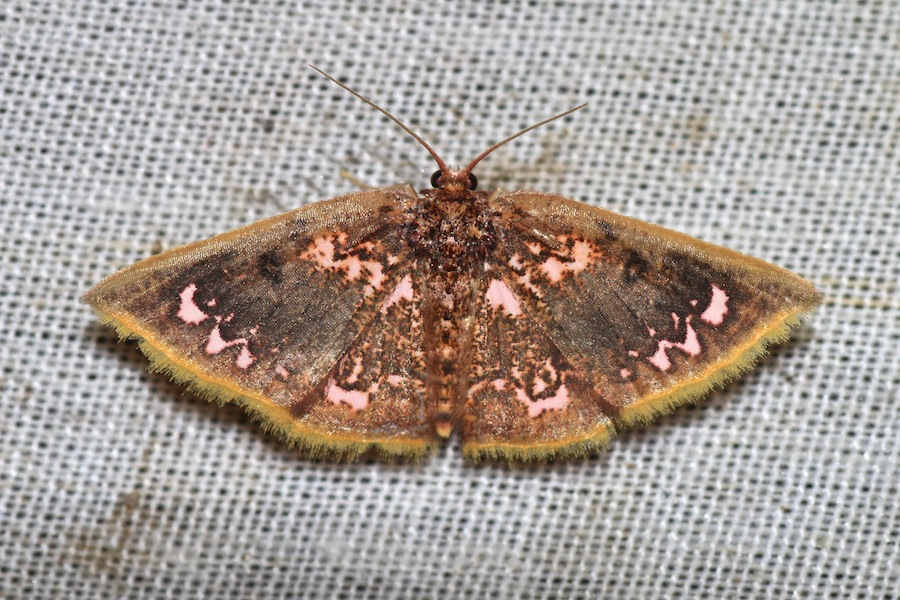

Scientific classification
- Kingdom: Animalia
- Phylum: Arthropoda
- Class: Insecta
- Order: Lepidoptera
- Family: Geometridae
- Genus: Chrysocraspeda
- Species: C. abhadraca

Binomial name
- Chrysocraspeda abhadraca (Walker, 1861)

Synonyms
- Ephyra abhadraca Walker, 1861

= Chrysocraspeda abhadraca =

Species of moth

Chrysocraspeda abhadraca is a species of moth in the family Geometridae described by Francis Walker in 1861. It is found in the Indian subregion including India and Sri Lanka, Peninsular Malaysia, Sumatra and Borneo.

== Description ==
The wingspan is about 20 mm in the male and 26 mm in the female. Antennae of the male are bipectinate (comb like on both sides) to three-fourths length. Hind tibia with two spur pairs. Hindwings with veins 6 and 7 from angle of cell or on a short stalk. Wings with evenly rounded outer margin. Forewings with produced and acute apex. It is generally brownish, but the head, thorax and abdomen are suffused with crimson and the metathorax has two white specks. The forewings have a diffused sub-basal band of pale pink not reaching the costa and with some dark specks on it. A small dark annulus at end of the cell. A submarginal diffused pink band with ill-defined waved dark line on it. Hindwings with sub-basal pink dark-edged band. It has a silvery-white discocellular spot. A diffused postmedial band of pink blotches with some darker marks found on it. Cilia of both wings orange, whereas the ventral side is bright pinkish.

The larva is yellowish green and unmarked. Black setae found on reddish-black pinacula. A darker dorsal line and rose-brown patches can be seen ventrally. Pupa typically grass green. Larvae are found on Eugenia species.
