= Metallaxis teledapa =

Scientific classification
- Kingdom: Animalia
- Phylum: Arthropoda
- Clade: Pancrustacea
- Class: Insecta
- Order: Lepidoptera
- Family: Geometridae
- Genus: Metallaxis
- Species: M. teledapa

Binomial name
- Metallaxis teledapa Prout, 1932

Species of moth

Metallaxis teledapa is a species of moth of the family Geometridae. It is found in northern Madagascar.

This species has a wingspan of 18–21 millimetres (0.71–0.83 in).
