= Chrysocraspeda nasuta =

Scientific classification
- Kingdom: Animalia
- Phylum: Arthropoda
- Clade: Pancrustacea
- Class: Insecta
- Order: Lepidoptera
- Family: Geometridae
- Genus: Chrysocraspeda
- Species: C. nasuta

Binomial name
- Chrysocraspeda nasuta (Prout, 1934)

Synonyms
- Ptochophyle nasuta Prout, 1934

Species of moth

Chrysocraspeda nasuta is a species of moth of the family Geometridae. It is found in Madagascar.

This species has a wingspan of 24 mm.
