= Chrysocraspeda neurina =

Scientific classification
- Kingdom: Animalia
- Phylum: Arthropoda
- Clade: Pancrustacea
- Class: Insecta
- Order: Lepidoptera
- Family: Geometridae
- Genus: Chrysocraspeda
- Species: C. neurina

Binomial name
- Chrysocraspeda neurina (Prout, 1934)

Synonyms
- Ptochophyle neurina Prout, 1934

Species of moth

Chrysocraspeda neurina is a species of moth of the family Geometridae. It is found in Madagascar.

This species has a wingspan of 27 mm. Face and palpus are reddish: Wings, vertex, thorax and abdomen are purplish-grey. There are 2 transversal yellow lines on the fore- and hindwings.
