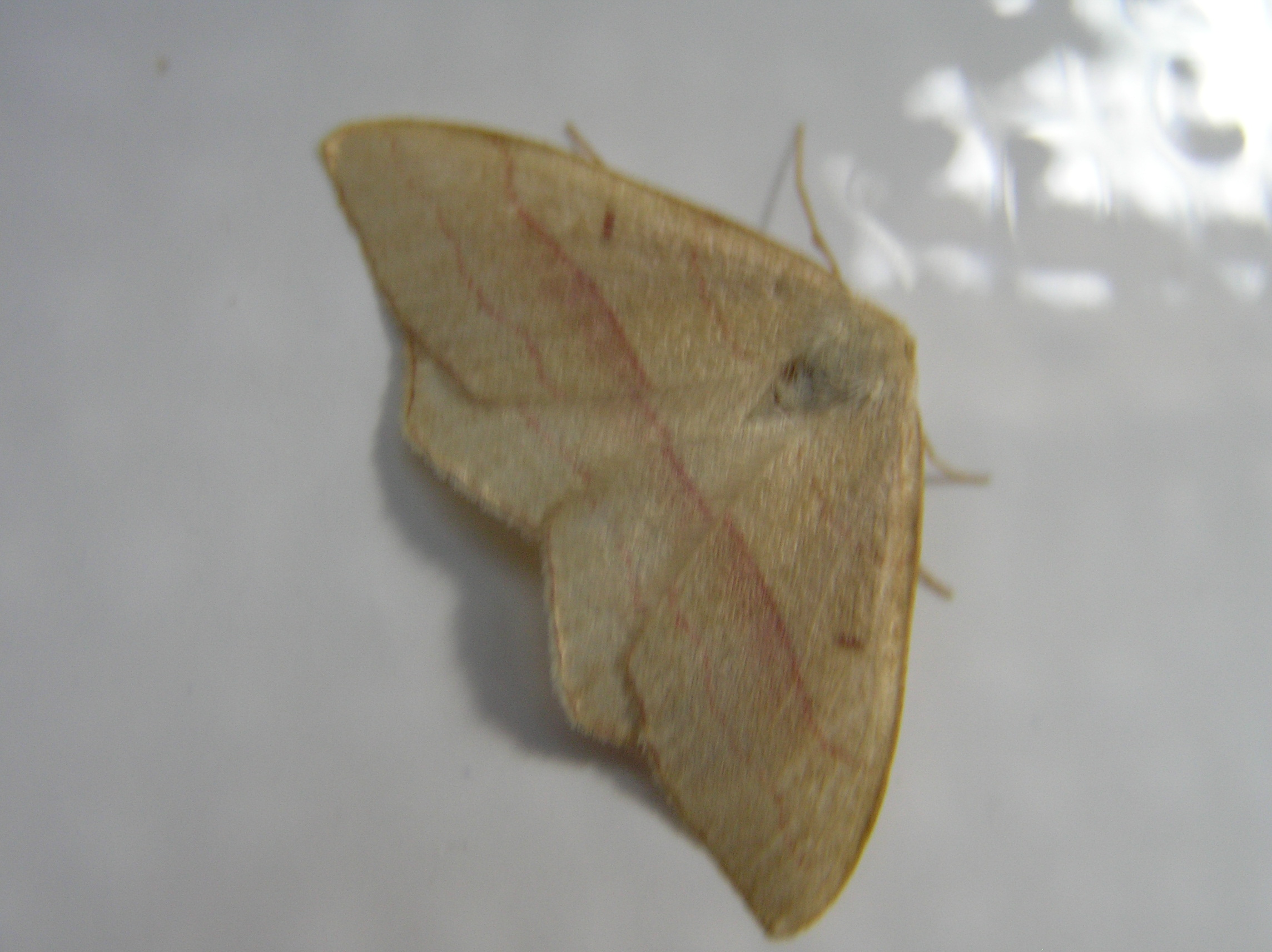

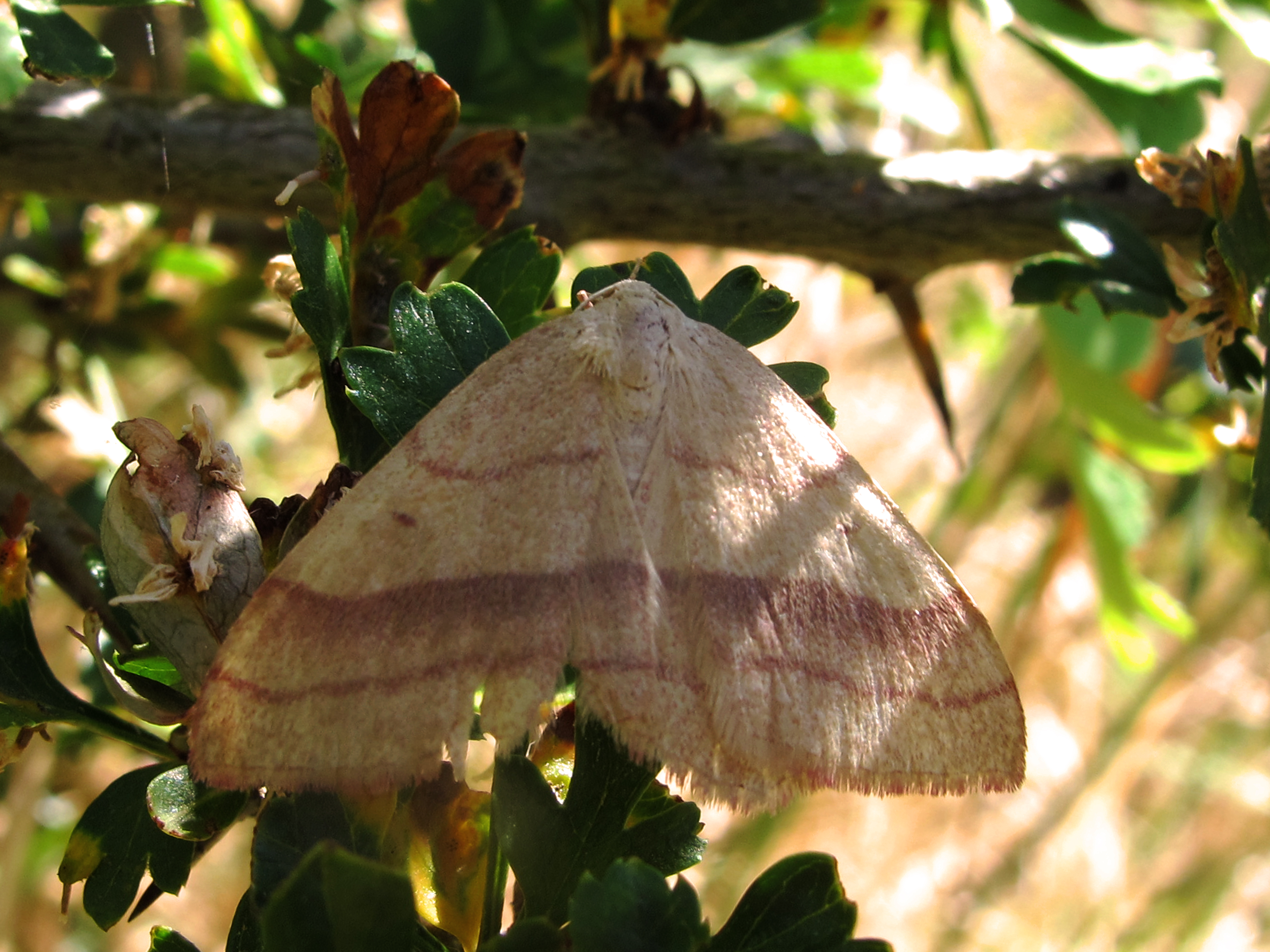

Scientific classification
- Domain: Eukaryota
- Kingdom: Animalia
- Phylum: Arthropoda
- Class: Insecta
- Order: Lepidoptera
- Family: Geometridae
- Genus: Rhodostrophia
- Species: R. vibicaria

Binomial name
- Rhodostrophia vibicaria (Clerck, 1759)

Synonyms
- Phalaena vibicaria Clerck, 1759; Phalaena cruentata Scopoli, 1763; Rhodostrophia minuta Heydemann, 1933

= Rhodostrophia vibicaria =

Species of moth

Rhodostrophia vibicaria, the common pink-barred, is a moth of the family Geometridae. The species can be found in the Palearctic realm, including North Africa and most of Europe.

== Description ==
The length of the forewings is 14–16 mm. In the Netherlands, the moths fly in one or two generations from the end of May to early September.

The larvae feed on various plants and shrubs, such as species of Cytisus, Genista, Prunus, Calluna, and Viscaria.

== Subspecies ==
There are three subspecies:

- Rhodostrophia vibicaria vibicaria (Clerck, 1759)
- Rhodostrophia vibicaria strigata (Staudinger, 1871)
- Rhodostrophia vibicaria unicolorata (Staudinger, 1871)
