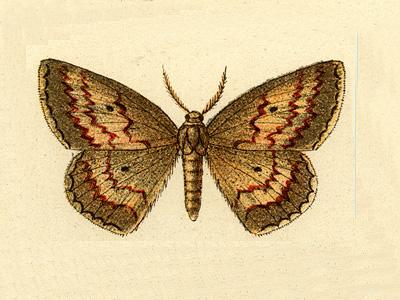

Scientific classification
- Kingdom: Animalia
- Phylum: Arthropoda
- Class: Insecta
- Order: Lepidoptera
- Family: Geometridae
- Genus: Semaeopus
- Species: S. castaria

Binomial name
- Semaeopus castaria (Guenee, 1858)

Synonyms
- Cnemodes castaria Guenee, 1858; Acidalia concinnata Felder & Rogenhofer, 1875; Acidalia solitaria Walker, 1861

= Semaeopus castaria =

Species of moth

Semaeopus castaria is a moth of the family Geometridae first described by Achille Guenée in 1858. It is found on Hispaniola and Jamaica.
