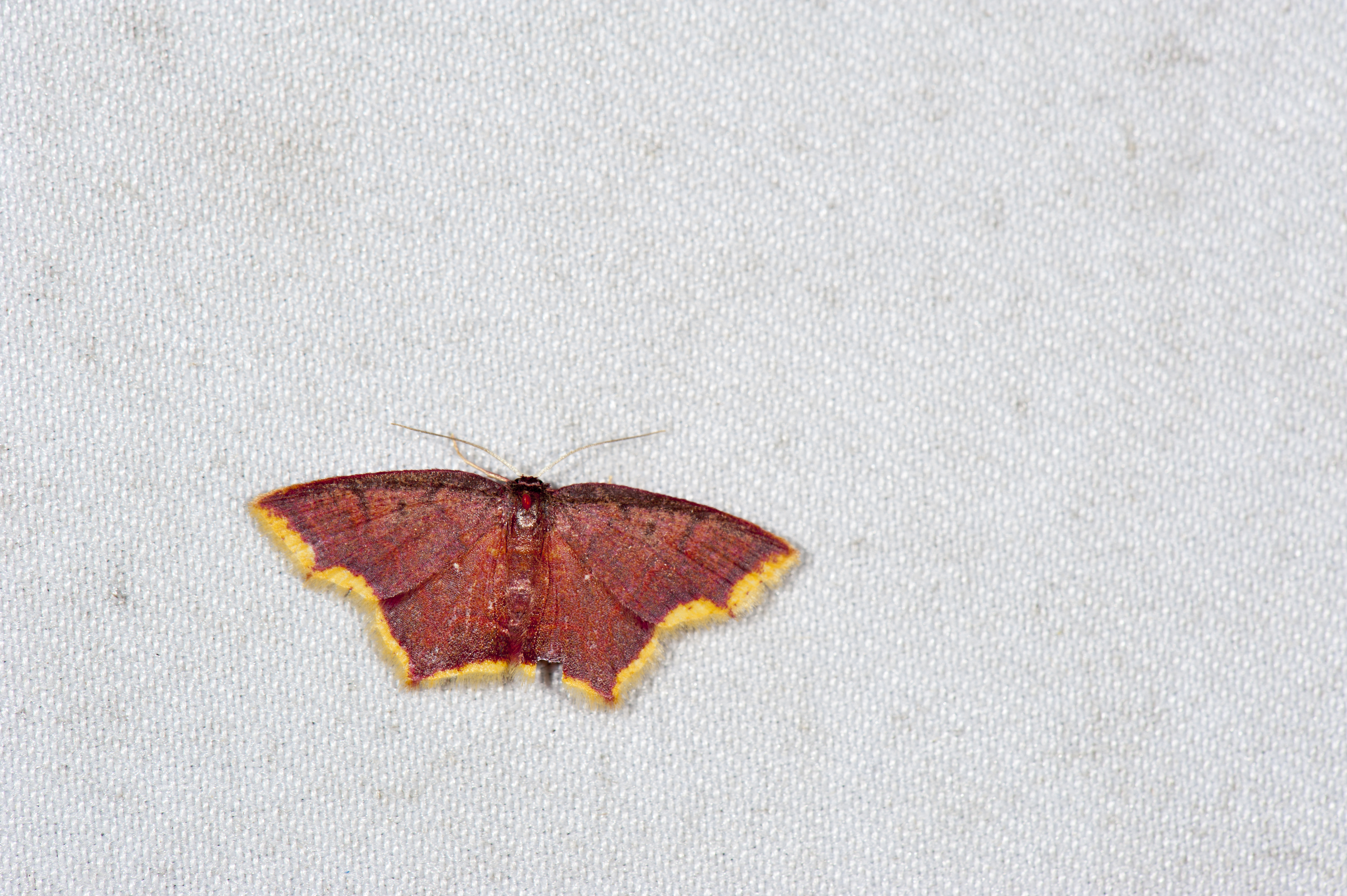
- Female
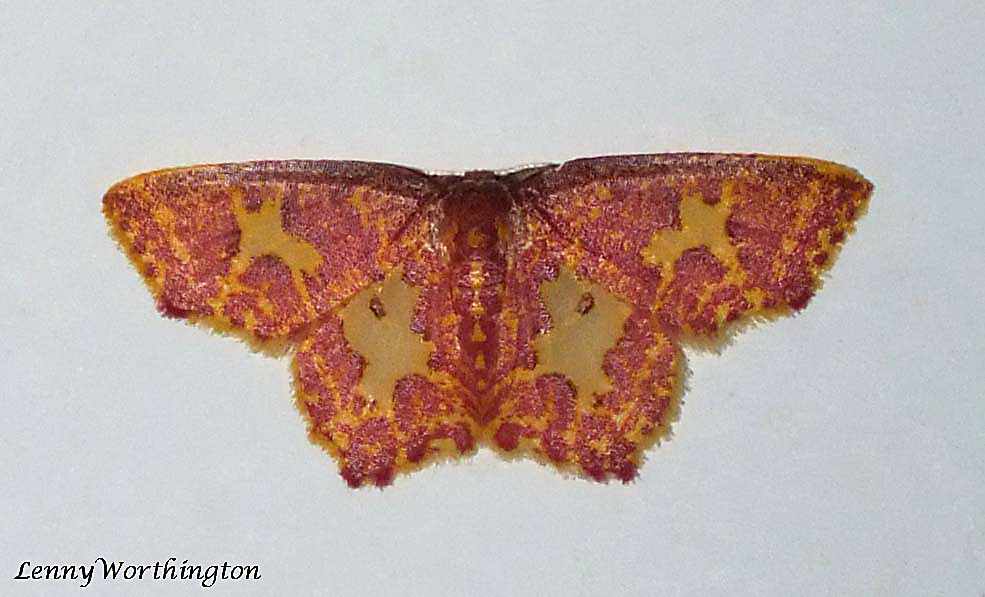
- Male

Scientific classification
- Kingdom: Animalia
- Phylum: Arthropoda
- Clade: Pancrustacea
- Class: Insecta
- Order: Lepidoptera
- Family: Geometridae
- Genus: Chrysocraspeda
- Species: C. faganaria

Binomial name
- Chrysocraspeda faganaria (Guenée, [1858])

= Chrysocraspeda faganaria =

Species of moth

Chrysocraspeda faganaria is a moth of the family Geometridae first described by Achille Guenée in 1858. It is found in Japan, Java, Sumatra, Singapore, Borneo, Taiwan, and Sri Lanka.
