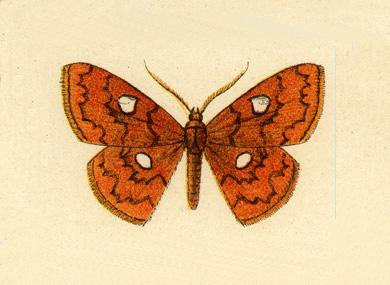

Scientific classification
- Kingdom: Animalia
- Phylum: Arthropoda
- Clade: Pancrustacea
- Class: Insecta
- Order: Lepidoptera
- Family: Geometridae
- Genus: Semaeopus
- Species: S. argocosma

Binomial name
- Semaeopus argocosma L. B. Prout, 1935

= Semaeopus argocosma =

Species of moth

Semaeopus argocosma is a moth of the family Geometridae first described by Louis Beethoven Prout in 1935. It is found on Jamaica.
