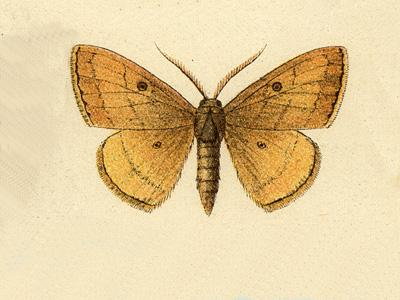

Scientific classification
- Kingdom: Animalia
- Phylum: Arthropoda
- Class: Insecta
- Order: Lepidoptera
- Family: Geometridae
- Genus: Semaeopus
- Species: S. indignaria

Binomial name
- Semaeopus indignaria (Guenee, 1857)

Synonyms
- Cnemodes indignaria Guenee, 1857; Ephyra filiferata Walker, 1863; Drepanodes absconditaria Walker, 1863

= Semaeopus indignaria =

Species of moth

Semaeopus indignaria is a moth of the family Geometridae first described by Achille Guenée in 1857. It is found in South America and on the Greater Antilles.

== Subspecies ==
- Semaeopus indignaria indignaria (South America)
- Semaeopus indignaria filiferata Walker, 1863 (Greater Antilles)
