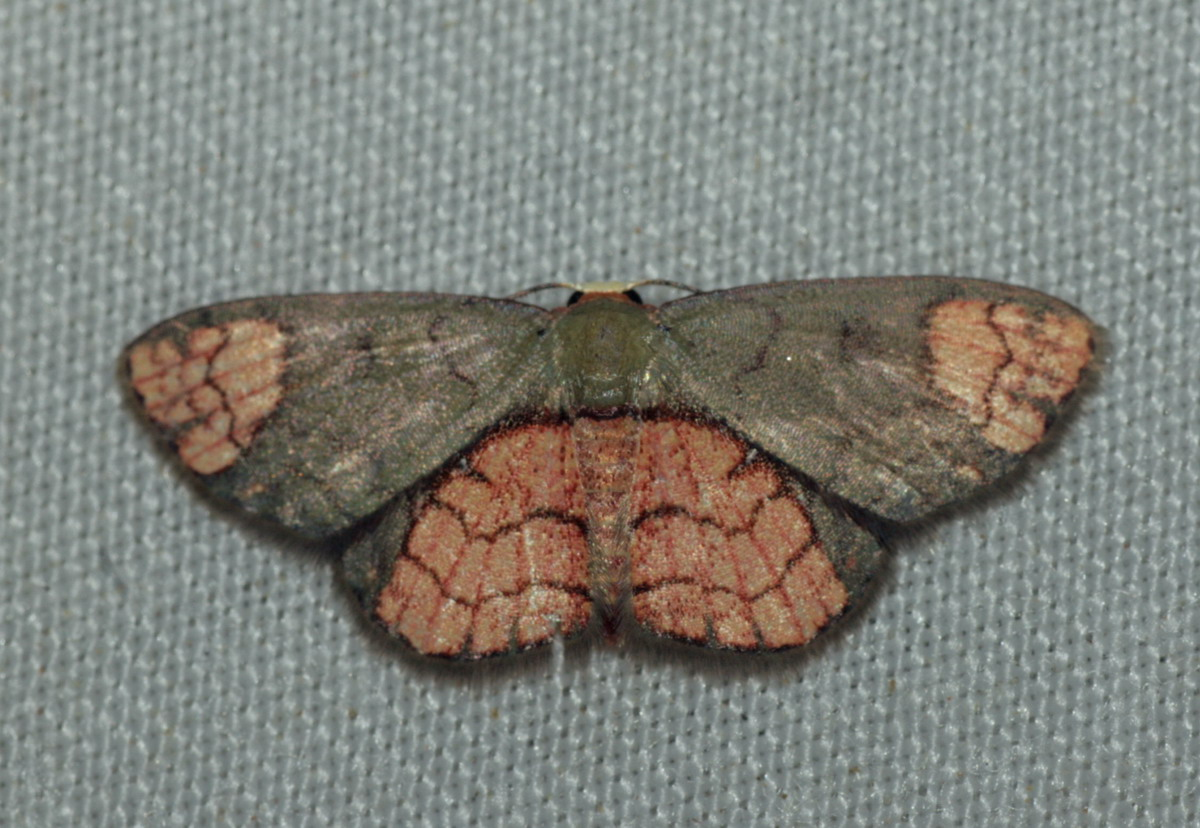
- Metallaxis semiustus from Borneo

Scientific classification
- Kingdom: Animalia
- Phylum: Arthropoda
- Clade: Pancrustacea
- Class: Insecta
- Order: Lepidoptera
- Family: Geometridae
- Tribe: Rhodostrophiini
- Genus: Metallaxis; Prout, 1932

Type species
- Metallaxis semiustus Swinhoe, 1894

= Metallaxis =

Genus of moths

Metallaxis is a genus of moths in the family Geometridae first described by Louis Beethoven Prout in 1932.

== Species ==
- Metallaxis amandae Holloway, 1997
- Metallaxis herbuloti Viette, 1978
- Metallaxis miniata Yazaki & M. Wang, 2004
- Metallaxis semipurpurascens Hampson, 1896
- Metallaxis semiustus Swinhoe, 1894
- Metallaxis sogai Viette, 1979
- Metallaxis teledapa L. B. Prout, 1932
