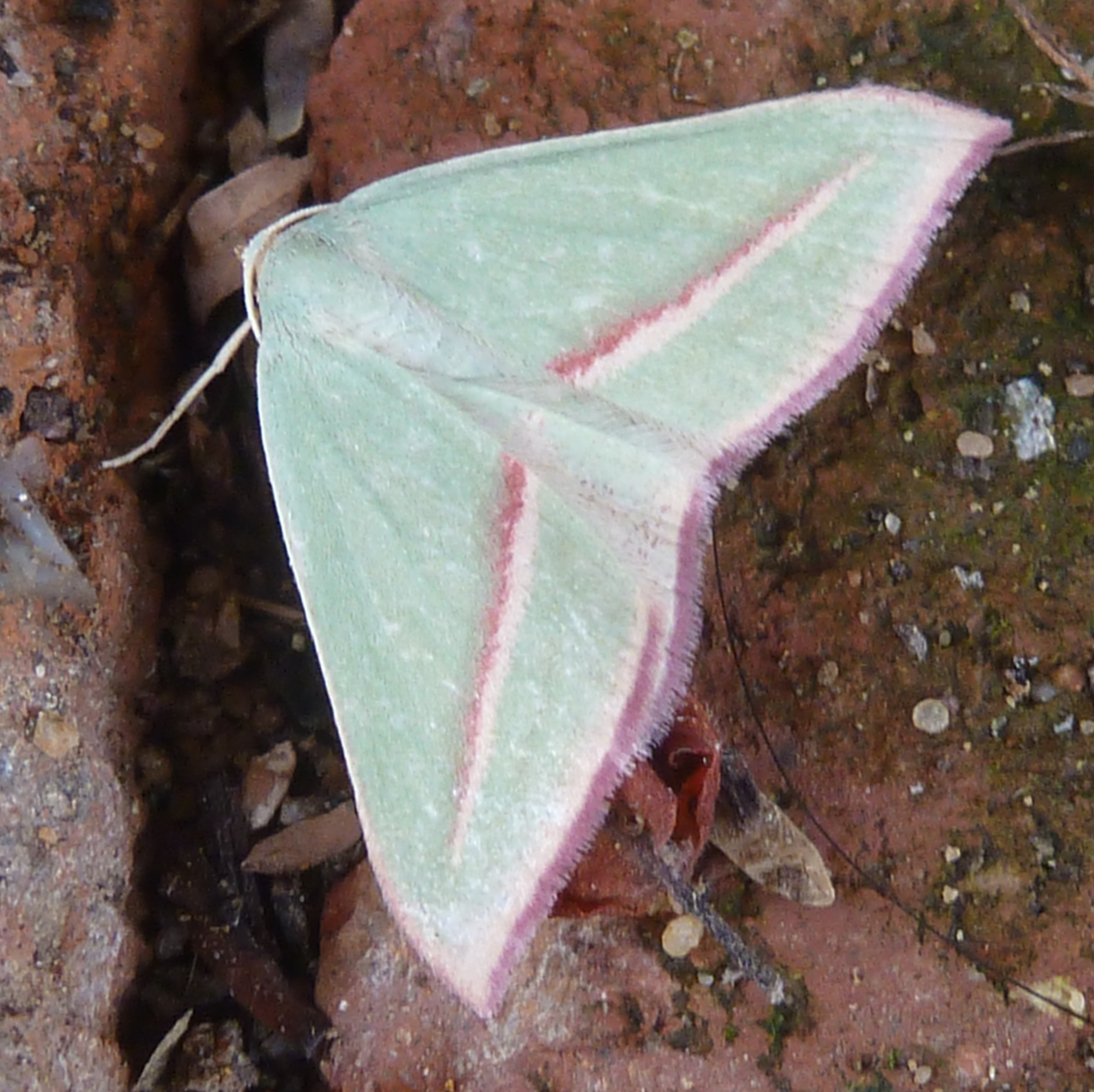
- Chlorerythra rubriplaga

Scientific classification
- Kingdom: Animalia
- Phylum: Arthropoda
- Clade: Pancrustacea
- Class: Insecta
- Order: Lepidoptera
- Family: Geometridae
- Tribe: Cosymbiini
- Genus: Chlorerythra; Warren, 1895

= Chlorerythra =

Genus of moths

Chlorerythra is a genus of moths in the family Geometridae.

== Species ==
- Chlorerythra borbonica Guillermet, 2004
- Chlorerythra rubriplaga Warren, 1895
