= Chrysocraspeda angulosa =

Scientific classification
- Domain: Eukaryota
- Kingdom: Animalia
- Phylum: Arthropoda
- Class: Insecta
- Order: Lepidoptera
- Family: Geometridae
- Genus: Chrysocraspeda
- Species: C. angulosa

Binomial name
- Chrysocraspeda angulosa Herbulot, 1970

Synonyms
- Ptochophyle angulosa, Herbulot, 1970

Species of moth

Chrysocraspeda angulosa is a species of moth of the family Geometridae first described by Claude Herbulot in 1970. It is found in northern Madagascar.

The head is reddish brown with white antennas, the upperside of the thorax is reddish brown mixed with grey, the underside and the legs are clear yellow. The length of its forewings is 13.5 mm.
