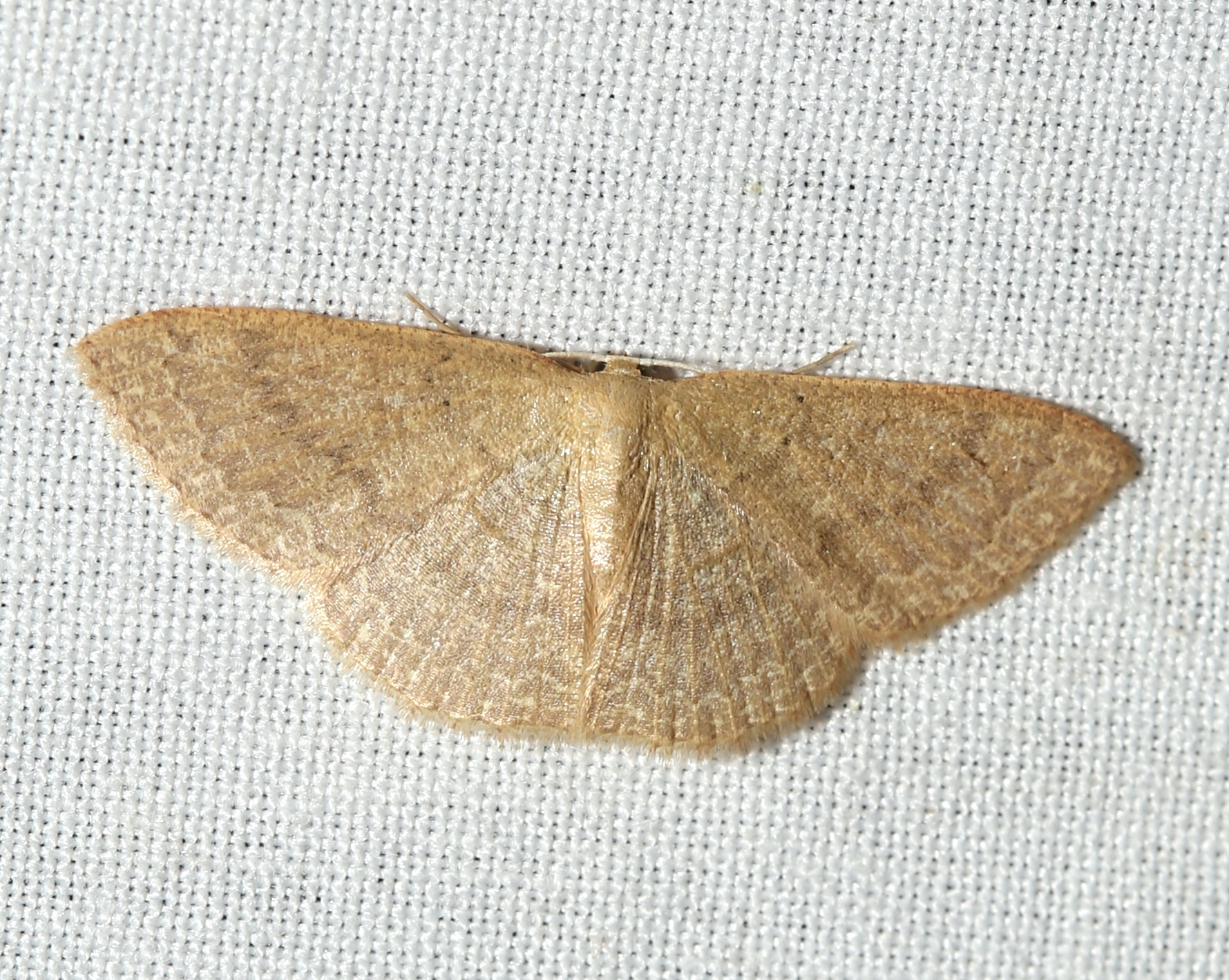
- Adult
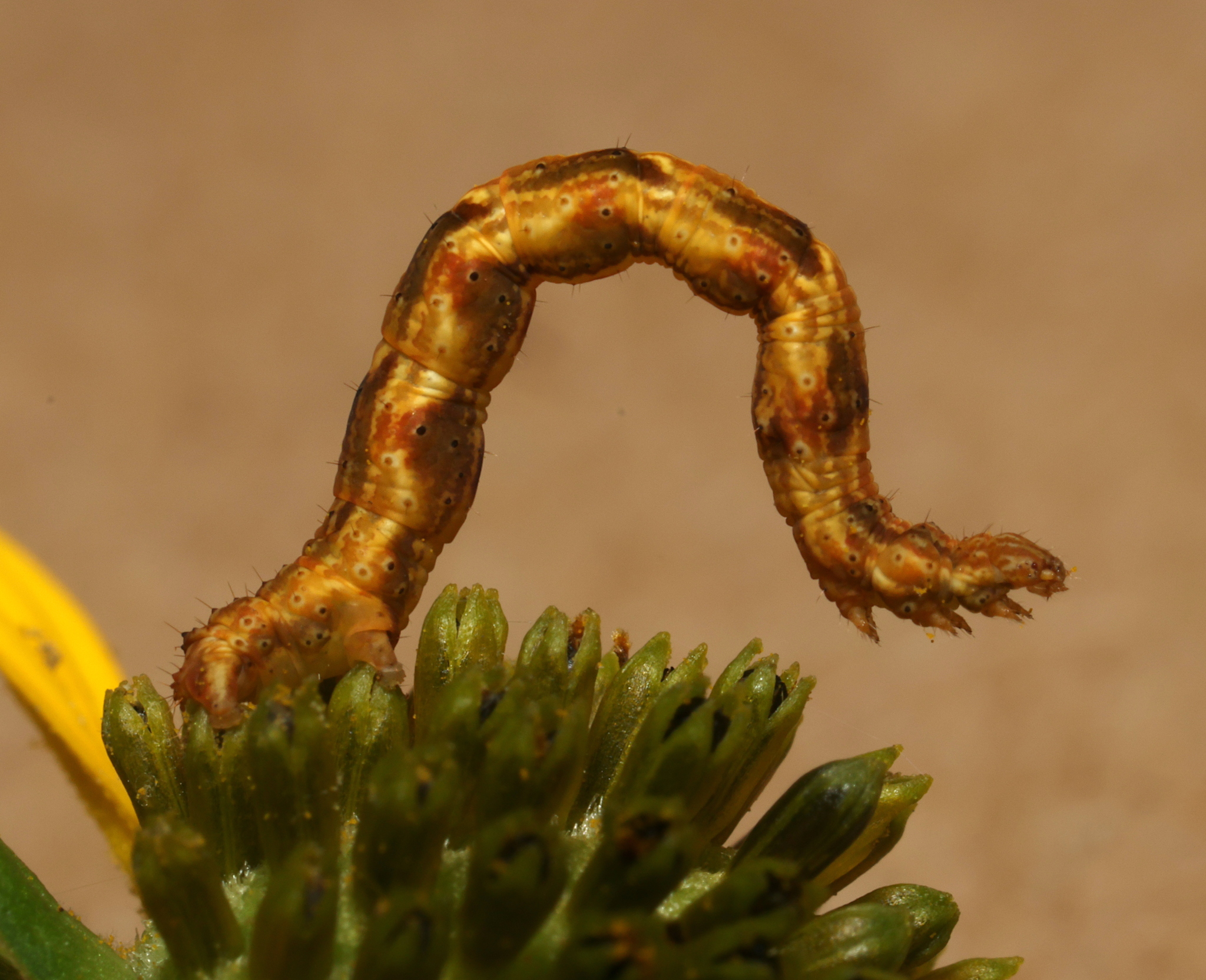
- Larva on Rudbeckia laciniata

Scientific classification
- Kingdom: Animalia
- Phylum: Arthropoda
- Class: Insecta
- Order: Lepidoptera
- Family: Geometridae
- Genus: Pleuroprucha
- Species: P. insulsaria

Binomial name
- Pleuroprucha insulsaria (Guenée, 1857)

Synonyms
- Acidalia insulsaria Guenée, 1857; Deptalia insulsaria; Deptatta insulsaria; Acidalia asthenaria Walker, 1861; Acidalia nivariata Walker, 1862; Acidalia persimilata Grote, 1863; Pleuroprucha placidaria (Guenée, 1857); Pleuroprucha invariata (Walker, 1863)

= Pleuroprucha insulsaria =

Common tan wave moth

Species of moth

Pleuroprucha insulsaria, the common tan wave moth, is a moth of the family Geometridae that was first described by Achille Guenée in 1857. It is found in eastern North America, from Nova Scotia to Florida, west to Texas and Colorado and north to Ontario. It ranges south through Mexico and Central America into South America (including Venezuela) and has been recorded as far south as the Galápagos Islands. It has also been recorded from the West Indies, including Jamaica.

The wingspan is 14-21 mm. Adults are on wing from March or April to October in the southern part of the range. In the north, adults have been recorded from June to October.

The larvae feed on a wide range of plants, including Solanum dulcamara, Galium, Zea mays, Solidago, Castanea, Quercus and Salix species.
