= Discomiosis =

Scientific classification
- Kingdom: Animalia
- Phylum: Arthropoda
- Clade: Pancrustacea
- Class: Insecta
- Order: Lepidoptera
- Family: Geometridae
- Tribe: Rhodostrophiini
- Genus: Discomiosis; Prout, 1915

Genus of moths

Discomiosis is a genus of moths in the family Geometridae.

== Species ==
- Discomiosis anfractilinea Prout, 1915
- Discomiosis crescentifera (Warren, 1902)
- Discomiosis synnephes Prout, 1915
