= Chrysocraspeda olearia =

Scientific classification
- Kingdom: Animalia
- Phylum: Arthropoda
- Class: Insecta
- Order: Lepidoptera
- Family: Geometridae
- Genus: Chrysocraspeda
- Species: C. olearia

Binomial name
- Chrysocraspeda olearia Guenée, 1857

Species of moth

Chrysocraspeda olearia is a moth of the family Geometridae first described by Achille Guenée in 1857. It is found in oriental regions such as India, Sri Lanka, and some Far-East Asian countries.

The host plant of the caterpillar is Syzygium cumini.

One subspecies is recognized.

- Chrysocraspeda olearia ecteles Prout, 1938
