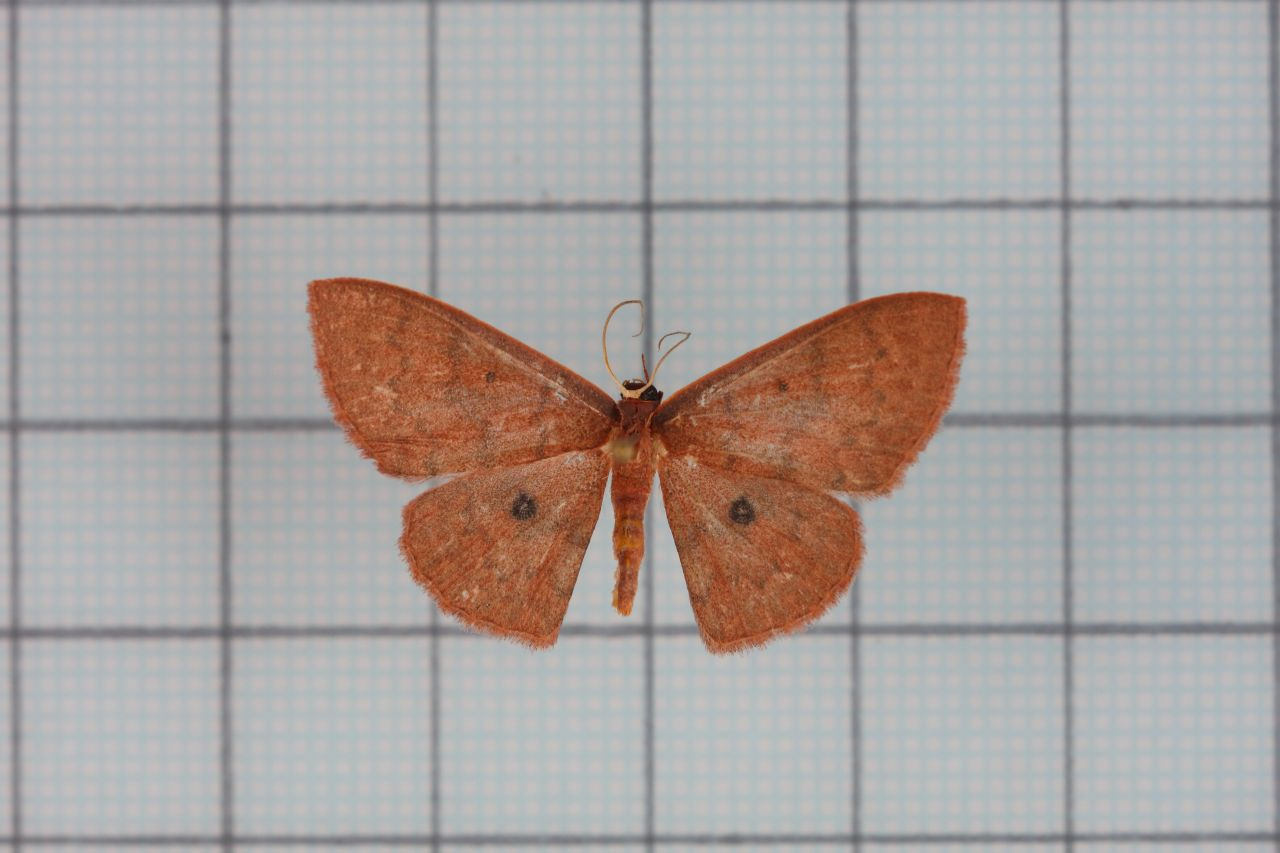

Scientific classification
- Kingdom: Animalia
- Phylum: Arthropoda
- Class: Insecta
- Order: Lepidoptera
- Family: Geometridae
- Genus: Organopoda
- Species: O. carnearia

Binomial name
- Organopoda carnearia (Walker, 1861)

Synonyms
- Anisodes carnearia Walker, 1861; Organopoda himalaica Prout, 1938

= Organopoda carnearia =

Species of moth

Organopoda carnearia is a species of moth of the family Geometridae. It is found in Japan, Indonesia, Sri Lanka and Taiwan.

== Description ==
The wingspan is about 27–36 mm. Pinkish-rufous moth with a fuscous tinge. Frons bright chestnut colored. Vertex of head and shaft of antennae whitish. Forewings with a fuscous fascia below costa. There are irregularly waved fuscous antemedial, postmedial, and submarginal lines, where the two latter bent inwards below vein 2. A dark discocellular speck present. Hindwings with fuscous edged white annulus at end of cell. An irregularly waved postmedial line present. Ventral side pinkish.
