= Chrysocraspeda eclipsis =

Scientific classification
- Kingdom: Animalia
- Phylum: Arthropoda
- Clade: Pancrustacea
- Class: Insecta
- Order: Lepidoptera
- Family: Geometridae
- Genus: Chrysocraspeda
- Species: C. eclipsis

Binomial name
- Chrysocraspeda eclipsis (Prout, 1932)

Synonyms
- Ptochophyle eclipsis Prout, 1932

Species of moth

Chrysocraspeda eclipsis is a species of moth of the family Geometridae. It is found in eastern Madagascar.

This species has a wingspan of 29 mm. Forewings are dark grey, tinged with vinaceous, head and body are concolorous with the wings.
