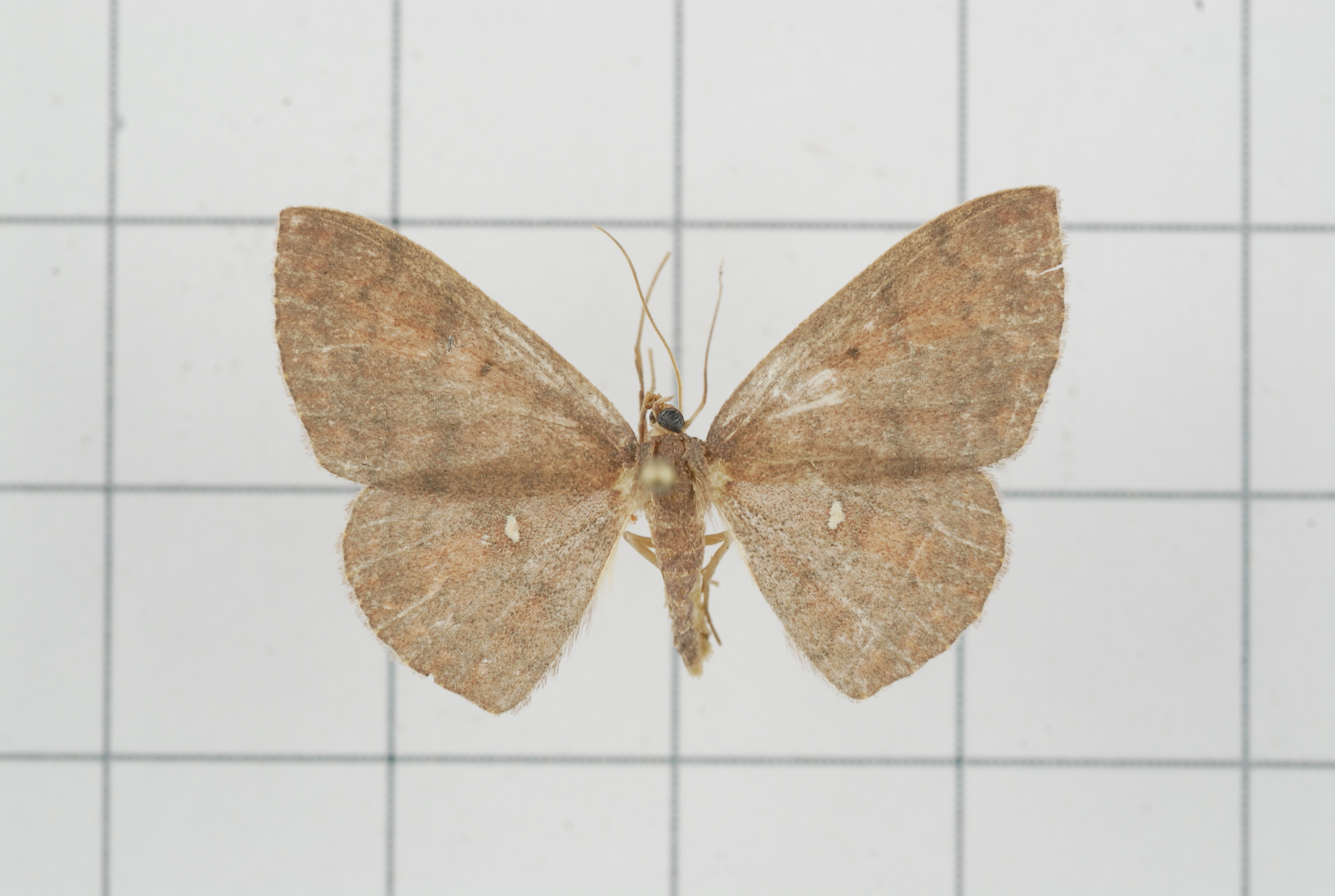
- Discoglypha hampsoni

Scientific classification
- Kingdom: Animalia
- Phylum: Arthropoda
- Class: Insecta
- Order: Lepidoptera
- Family: Geometridae
- Tribe: Rhodostrophiini
- Genus: Discoglypha

= Discoglypha =

Genus of moths

Discoglypha is a genus of moths in the family Geometridae.
