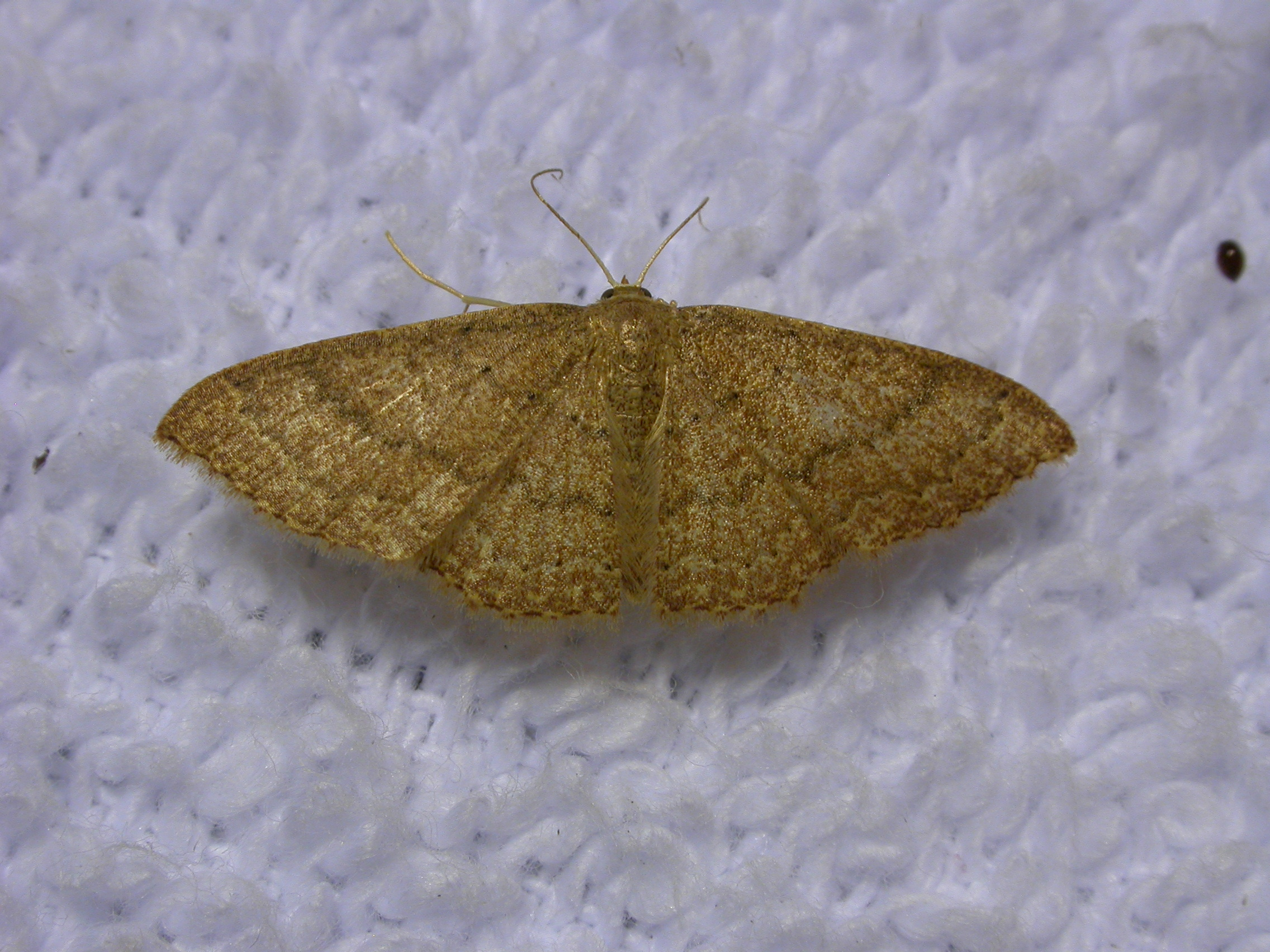

Scientific classification
- Kingdom: Animalia
- Phylum: Arthropoda
- Class: Insecta
- Order: Lepidoptera
- Family: Geometridae
- Genus: Pleuroprucha
- Species: P. asthenaria

Binomial name
- Pleuroprucha asthenaria (Walker, 1861)

Synonyms
- Acidalia imparata Walker 1863

= Pleuroprucha asthenaria =

Asthene wave moth

Species of moth

Pleuroprucha asthenaria, the asthene wave moth, is a moth of the family Geometridae. It is found in the United States, Cuba and Jamaica.
