= Mesotrophe intortaria =

Scientific classification
- Kingdom: Animalia
- Phylum: Arthropoda
- Class: Insecta
- Order: Lepidoptera
- Family: Geometridae
- Genus: Mesotrophe
- Species: M. intortaria

Binomial name
- Mesotrophe intortaria (Guenée, 1858)

Synonyms
- Anisodes intortaria Guenée, 1858; Anisodes expunctaria Walker, 1859; Anisodes responsaria Walker, 1861; Anisodes ovisignata Moore, 1887

Species of moth

Mesotrophe intortaria is a moth of the family Geometridae first described by Achille Guenée in 1858. It is found in the Oriental tropics of India, Sri Lanka to Borneo, Singapore, Sumatra and Sulawesi.

Host plants include Eucalyptus deglupta.
