= Rhodostrophia sieversi =

Scientific classification
- Domain: Eukaryota
- Kingdom: Animalia
- Phylum: Arthropoda
- Class: Insecta
- Order: Lepidoptera
- Family: Geometridae
- Genus: Rhodostrophia
- Species: R. sieversi

Binomial name
- Rhodostrophia sieversi (Christoph, 1882)

Synonyms
- Aspilates sieversi Christoph, 1882

Species of moth

Rhodostrophia sieversi is a species of geometer moth, which is found in Turkey, Iran, and several other countries in the region. The records from Europe are doubtful.
