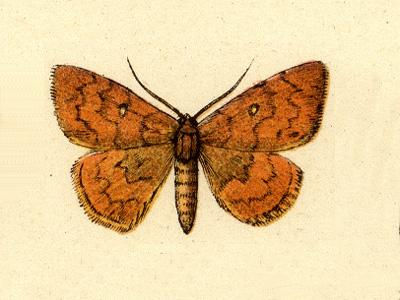

Scientific classification
- Kingdom: Animalia
- Phylum: Arthropoda
- Clade: Pancrustacea
- Class: Insecta
- Order: Lepidoptera
- Family: Geometridae
- Genus: Semaeopus
- Species: S. vincentii

Binomial name
- Semaeopus vincentii L. B. Prout, 1938

Synonyms
- Semaeopus luciae Prout, 1938

= Semaeopus vincentii =

Species of moth

Semaeopus vincentii is a moth of the family Geometridae first described by Louis Beethoven Prout in 1938. It is found on the Lesser Antilles.

== Subspecies ==
- Semaeopus vincentii vincentii (St. Vincent, Bequia)
- Semaeopus vincentii luciae Prout, 1938 (St. Lucia)
