= Rhodostrophia ferruginaria =

Scientific classification
- Kingdom: Animalia
- Phylum: Arthropoda
- Class: Insecta
- Order: Lepidoptera
- Family: Geometridae
- Genus: Rhodostrophia
- Species: R. ferruginaria

Binomial name
- Rhodostrophia ferruginaria (Blanchard, 1852)

Synonyms
- Acidalia ferruginaria Blanchard, 1852; Formiana ferruginaria; Scopula ferruginaria

Species of moth

Rhodostrophia ferruginaria is a moth of the family Geometridae. It is found in Chile.
