= Pseudosterrha paulula =

Scientific classification
- Domain: Eukaryota
- Kingdom: Animalia
- Phylum: Arthropoda
- Class: Insecta
- Order: Lepidoptera
- Family: Geometridae
- Genus: Pseudosterrha
- Species: P. paulula

Binomial name
- Pseudosterrha paulula (C. Swinhoe, 1886)

Synonyms
- Oligochroa gayneri Rothschild, 1901; Pseudosterrha ochrea (Warren, 1888); Sterha philaearia Brabant, 1896

Species of moth

Pseudosterrha paulula is a moth of the family Geometridae first described by Charles Swinhoe in 1886.

== Distribution ==
It known from Algeria, Chad, Egypt, India, Iran, Kenya, Saudi Arabia, Senegal, Somalia, Sudan, Tanzania and the United Arab Emirates.
