= Rhodostrophiini =

Scientific classification
- Kingdom: Animalia
- Phylum: Arthropoda
- Clade: Pancrustacea
- Class: Insecta
- Order: Lepidoptera
- Family: Geometridae
- Subfamily: Sterrhinae
- Tribe: Rhodostrophiini; Prout, 1935

Genera
- See text

Tribe of moths

Rhodostrophiini is a tribe of the geometer moth family (Geometridae), with about 200 species in 17 genera and five genera tentatively associated with the tribe.

== Genera ==
- Anthemoctena Warren, 1895
- Apostates Warren, 1897
- Apostegania Prout, 1932
- Discoglypha Warren, 1896
- Discomiosis Prout, 1915
- Dithecodes Warren, 1900
- Erythrolophus Swinhoe, 1892
- Metallaxis Prout, 1932
- Neonemoria Warren, 1904
- Organopoda Hampson, 1893
- Pseuderythrolophus Prout, 1932
- Pylargosceles Prout, 1930
- Rhodostrophia Hübner, 1823
- Symmacra Warren, 1896
- Tanaotrichia Warren, 1893
- Tricentra Warren, 1900
- Zalissolepis Warren, 1895

== Uncertain association ==
- Craspediopsis Warren, 1895
- Lissoblemma Warren, 1902
- Orthoserica Warren, 1896
- Palaeaspilates Warren, 1894
- Tricentroscelis Prout, 1916
