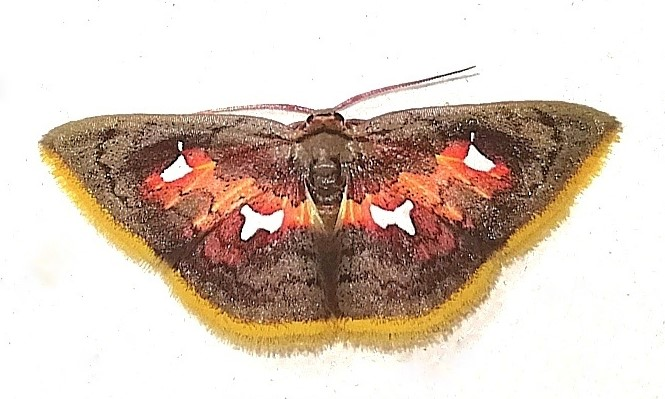
- Tricentra quadrigata

Scientific classification
- Domain: Eukaryota
- Kingdom: Animalia
- Phylum: Arthropoda
- Class: Insecta
- Order: Lepidoptera
- Family: Geometridae
- Tribe: Rhodostrophiini
- Genus: Tricentra; Warren, 1900

Synonyms
- Pammeris Warren, 1906

= Tricentra =

Genus of moths

Tricentra is a genus of moths in the family Geometridae.

== Species ==
- Tricentra acuta Herbulot, 1993
- Tricentra aequilobata Herbulot, 1993
- Tricentra albiguttata (Warren, 1906)
- Tricentra allotmeta Prout, 1917
- Tricentra amibomena Prout, 1918
- Tricentra angulisigna Dognin, 1908
- Tricentra apicata Dognin, 1910
- Tricentra argentipuncta (Warren, 1897)
- Tricentra ascantia (Druce, 1892)
- Tricentra auctidisca Prout, 1918
- Tricentra aurata (Warren, 1906)
- Tricentra aurilimbata Warren, 1906
- Tricentra benevisio Prout, 1932
- Tricentra biguttata Warren, 1906
- Tricentra bisignata Warren, 1907
- Tricentra brunneomarginata Warren, 1906
- Tricentra cambogiata (Warren, 1897)
- Tricentra carnaria (Herrich-Schaffer, 1854)
- Tricentra citrinaria Warren, 1907
- Tricentra commixta Warren, 1905
- Tricentra computaria (Snellen, 1874)
- Tricentra concava Herbulot, 1993
- Tricentra consequens Warren, 1906
- Tricentra debilis Dognin, 1906
- Tricentra decorata Warren, 1905
- Tricentra devigescens Prout, 1917
- Tricentra ellima (Schaus, 1901)
- Tricentra euriopis (Dyar, 1914)
- Tricentra flavicurvata Dognin, 1910
- Tricentra flavifigurata Prout, 1917
- Tricentra flavimarginata Warren, 1900
- Tricentra flavimargo Warren, 1905
- Tricentra flavitornata Prout, 1922
- Tricentra fulvifera Dognin, 1908
- Tricentra fumata (Warren, 1906)
- Tricentra gavisata (Walker, 1863)
- Tricentra gibbimargo Prout, 1918
- Tricentra ignefumosa Warren, 1906
- Tricentra irregularis Prout, 1935
- Tricentra kindli Herbulot, 1993
- Tricentra lalannei Herbulot, 1993
- Tricentra mimula Warren, 1907
- Tricentra navatteae Herbulot, 1993
- Tricentra necula Druce, 1892
- Tricentra neomysta Prout, 1935
- Tricentra ocrisia (Druce, 1892)
- Tricentra oeno (Druce, 1892)
- Tricentra percrocea Warren, 1906
- Tricentra protuberans Dognin, 1910
- Tricentra quadrigata (Felder & Rogenhofer, 1875)
- Tricentra spilopera Prout, 1935
- Tricentra subnexa Prout, 1935
- Tricentra subplumbea Bastelberger, 1908
- Tricentra unimacula Dognin, 1911
- Tricentra vinosata Warren, 1906
