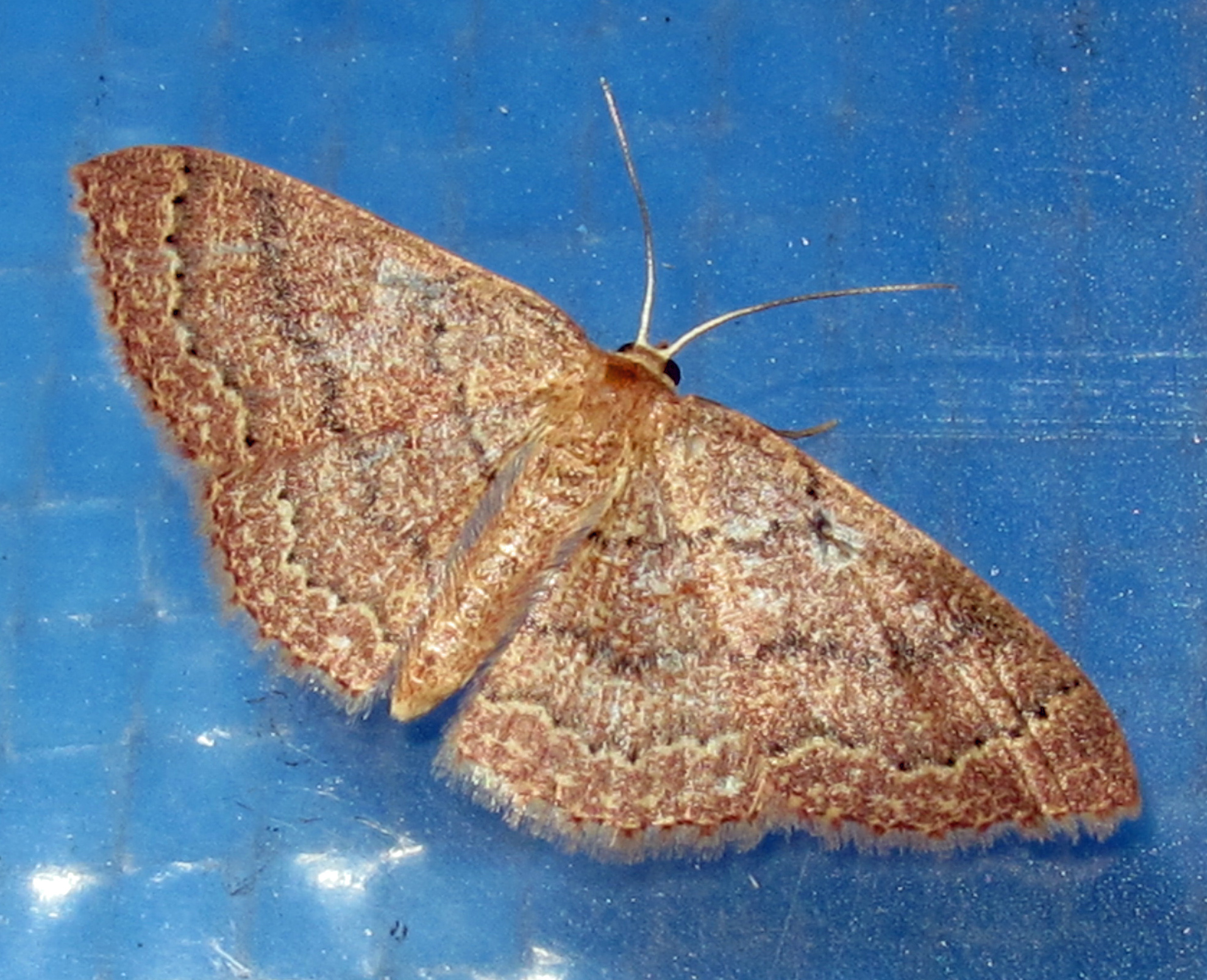
- Pleuroprucha insulsaria

Scientific classification
- Kingdom: Animalia
- Phylum: Arthropoda
- Class: Insecta
- Order: Lepidoptera
- Family: Geometridae
- Subfamily: Sterrhinae
- Genus: Pleuroprucha; Möschler, 1890

Synonyms
- Apallacta Möschler, 1890; Deptalia Hulst, 1896

= Pleuroprucha =

Genus of moths

Pleuroprucha is a genus of moths in the family Geometridae first described by Heinrich Benno Möschler in 1890.

== Species ==
- Pleuroprucha asthenaria (Walker, 1861)
- Pleuroprucha insulsaria (Guenée, 1857)
