= Lipotaxia =

Scientific classification
- Kingdom: Animalia
- Phylum: Arthropoda
- Class: Insecta
- Order: Lepidoptera
- Family: Geometridae
- Subfamily: Sterrhinae
- Genus: Lipotaxia

Genus of moths

Lipotaxia is a genus of moths in the family Geometridae.
