= Apostasia =

Apostasia may refer to:

- Apostasia of 1965, a series of political events in Greece, which toppled the legally elected government of George Papandreou, senior
- Apostasia (plant), a genus of primitive orchids (family Orchidaceae), comprising 7 terrestrial species

== See also ==
- Apostasy, abandonment of one's religion
