= Apostates solitaria =

Scientific classification
- Domain: Eukaryota
- Kingdom: Animalia
- Phylum: Arthropoda
- Class: Insecta
- Order: Lepidoptera
- Family: Geometridae
- Subfamily: Sterrhinae
- Tribe: Rhodostrophiini
- Genus: Apostates; Warren, 1897
- Species: A. solitaria

Binomial name
- Apostates solitaria (Christoph, 1887)

Monotypic genus of geometer moths

Apostates is a monotypic moth genus in the family Geometridae described by Warren in 1897. Its only species, Apostates solitaria, was first described by Hugo Theodor Christoph in 1887. It was found in Transcaspia, then an oblast of the Russian Empire.
