= Trygodes =

Scientific classification
- Kingdom: Animalia
- Phylum: Arthropoda
- Class: Insecta
- Order: Lepidoptera
- Family: Geometridae
- Subfamily: Sterrhinae
- Genus: Trygodes

Genus of moths

Trygodes is a genus of moths in the family Geometridae.

== Description ==
Palpi slender and reaching just beyond the frons. Antennae of male ciliated. Hindlegs much reduced, tibia dilated with a large tuft of long hair from base and without spurs. Abdomen with lateral tufts of hair towards extremity. Forewings with vein 3 from angle of cell and vein 5 from somewhat above middle of discocellulars. Veins 7, 8, 9 and 10 stalked, and vein 11 anastomosing (fusing) slightly with them to form the areole. Hindwings with vein 3 from angle of cell. Vein 5 from somewhat above middle of discocellulars.
