= Tricentra necula =

Scientific classification
- Domain: Eukaryota
- Kingdom: Animalia
- Phylum: Arthropoda
- Class: Insecta
- Order: Lepidoptera
- Family: Geometridae
- Genus: Tricentra
- Species: T. necula

Binomial name
- Tricentra necula H. Druce, 1892

Synonyms
- Cambogia necula; Eois necula

Species of moth

Tricentra necula is a moth in the family Geometridae first described by Herbert Druce in 1892. It is found in Panama.
