= Mesotrophe =

Scientific classification
- Kingdom: Animalia
- Phylum: Arthropoda
- Clade: Pancrustacea
- Class: Insecta
- Order: Lepidoptera
- Family: Geometridae
- Subfamily: Sterrhinae
- Genus: Mesotrophe; Hampson, 1893

Genus of moths

Mesotrophe is a genus of moths in the family Geometridae erected by George Hampson in 1893. Lepidoptera and Some Other Life Forms regards it as a synonym of Anisodes.

== Species ==
- Mesotrophe alienaria (Walker, 1863)
- Mesotrophe curtisi Prout 1920
- Mesotrophe harrietae Robinson 1975
- Mesotrophe impavida Prout 1938
- Mesotrophe intortaria Guenée [1858]
- Mesotrophe maximaria Guenée [1858]
- Mesotrophe nephelospila Meyrick 1889
- Mesotrophe rudis Prout 1920
