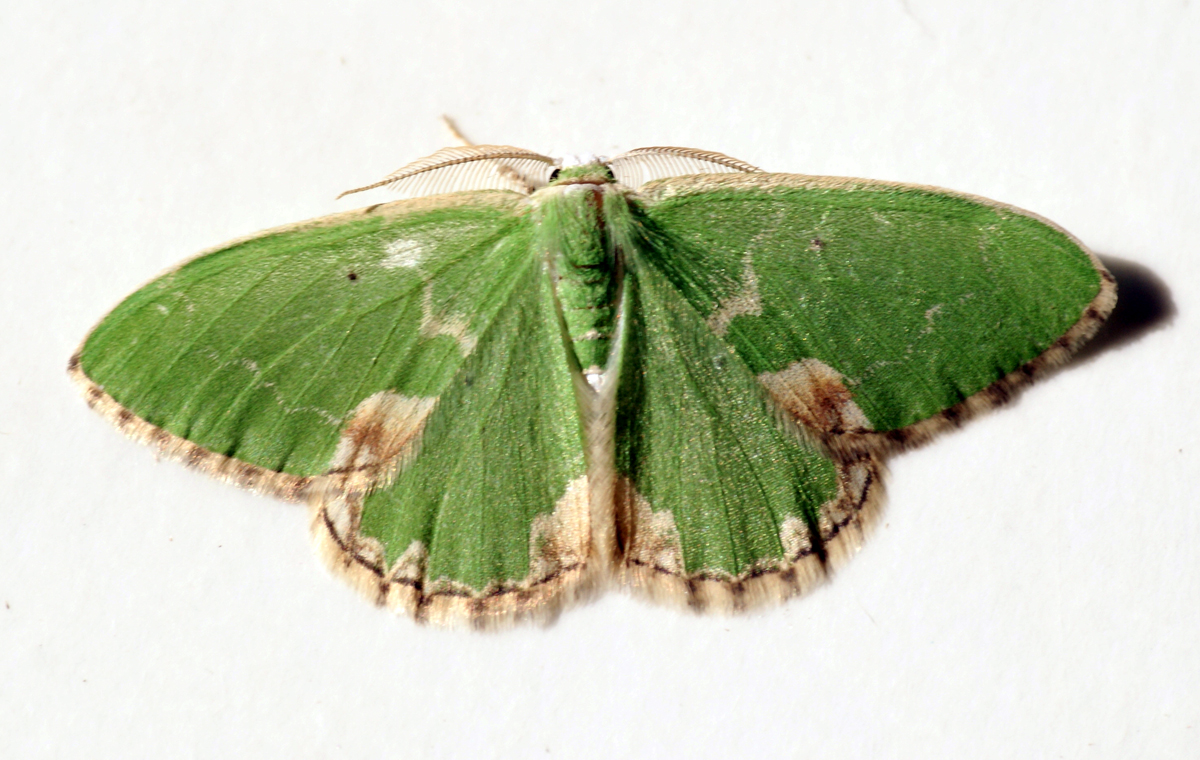

Scientific classification
- Domain: Eukaryota
- Kingdom: Animalia
- Phylum: Arthropoda
- Class: Insecta
- Order: Lepidoptera
- Family: Geometridae
- Subfamily: Geometrinae
- Tribe: Comibaenini
- Genus: Comibaena
- Species: C. bajularia

Binomial name
- Comibaena bajularia (Denis & Schiffermüller, 1775)

Synonyms
- Euchloris pustulata (Hufnagel, 1767)

= Blotched emerald =

Species of moth

The blotched emerald (Comibaena bajularia) is a moth of the family Geometridae. The species was first described by Michael Denis and Ignaz Schiffermüller in 1775. It is found throughout Europe and the Near East. It has a scattered distribution in England and Wales, but is absent from Scotland and Ireland. In the southern Alps it rises up to 1000 metres.It is mainly found in oak forests.

== Adult ==
The wings are green with brown and white chequered fringes and prominent buff and white blotches at the tornus. The forewings are marked with two narrow, white fascia. The wingspan is 30–35 mm. In the southern part of the British Isles it flies in June and July, where it may be common in some oakwoods. It flies at night and is attracted to light, the male more so than the female.

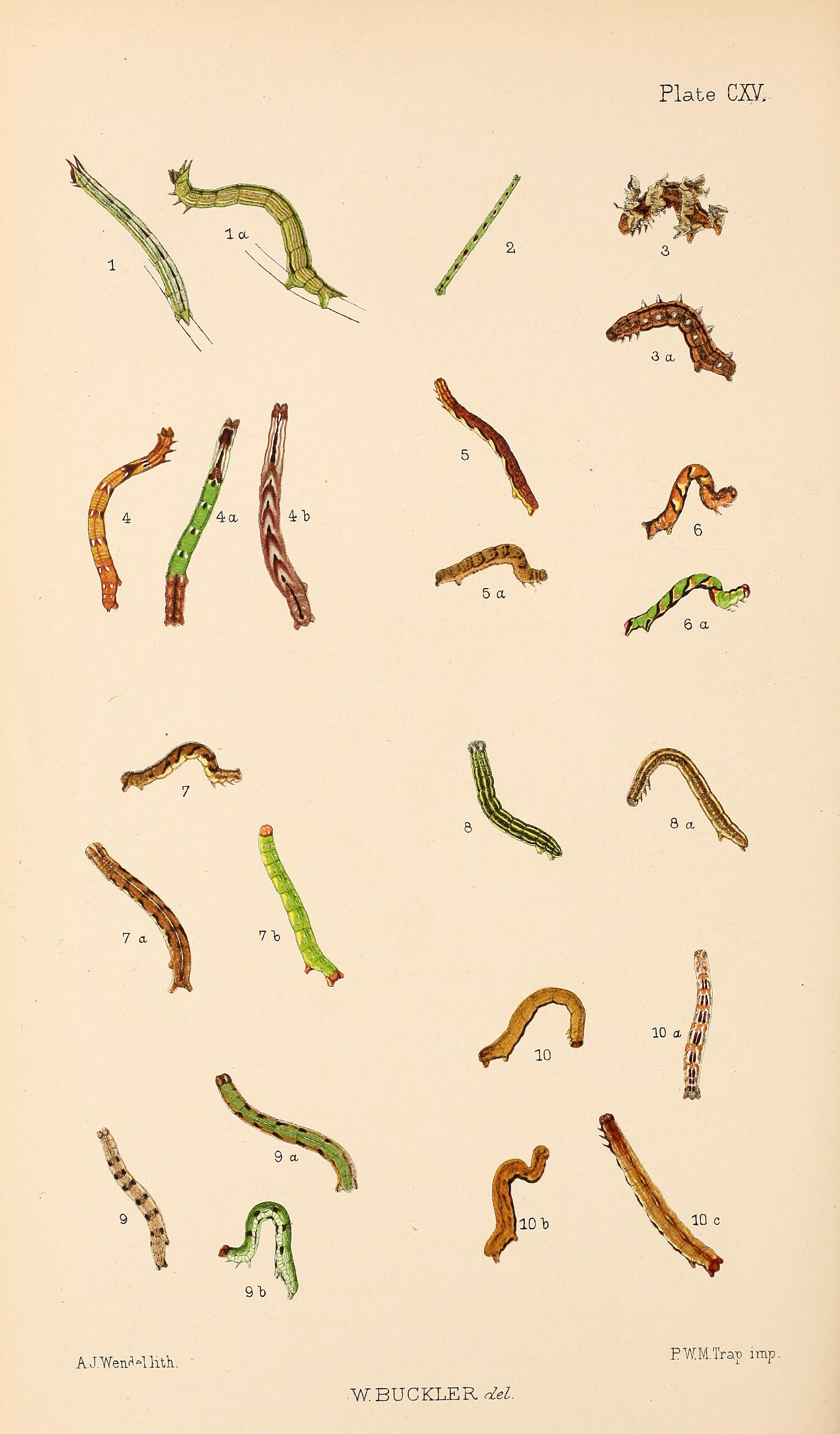
Figs 3, 3a "clothed and unclothed"

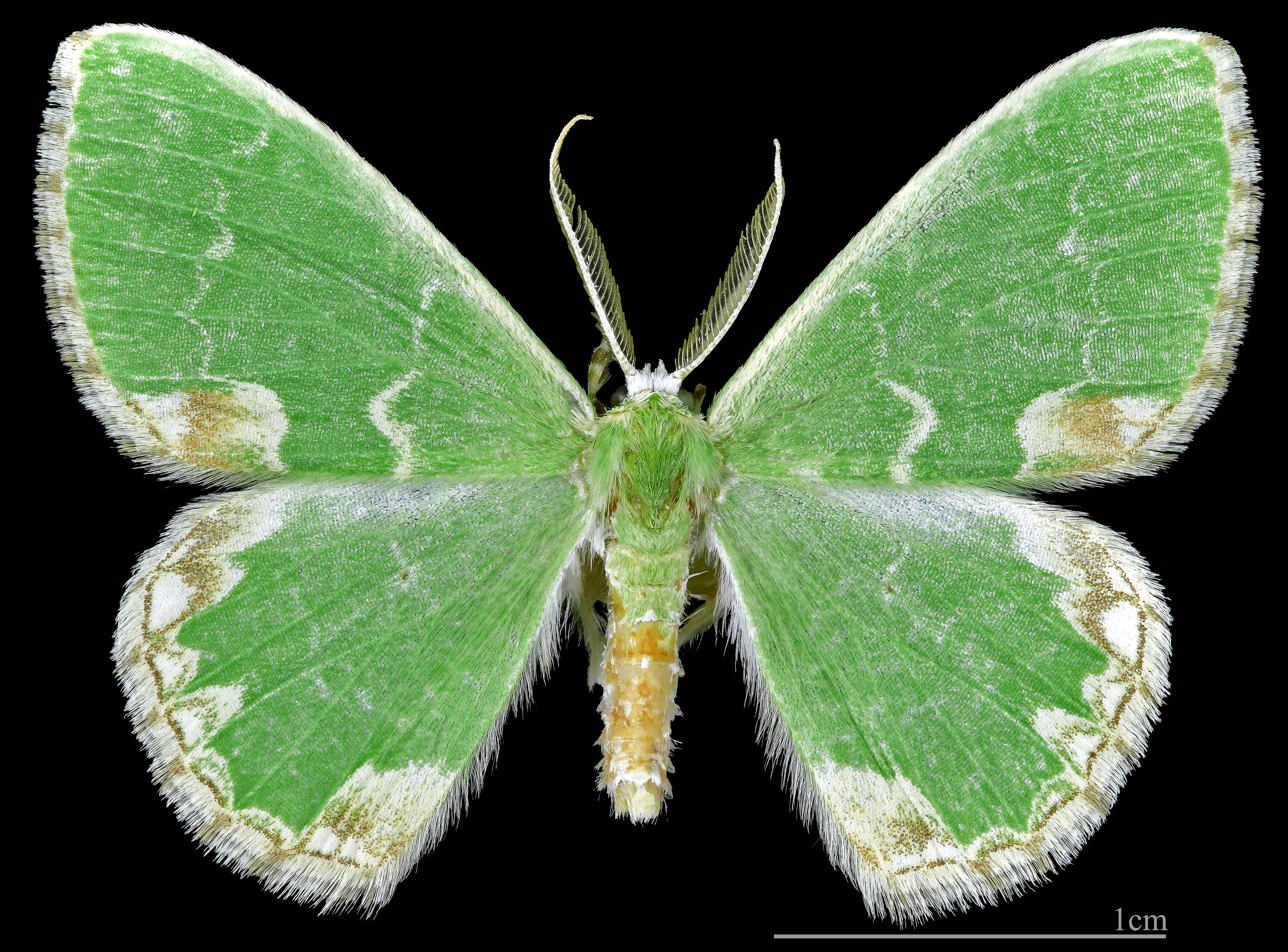
♂

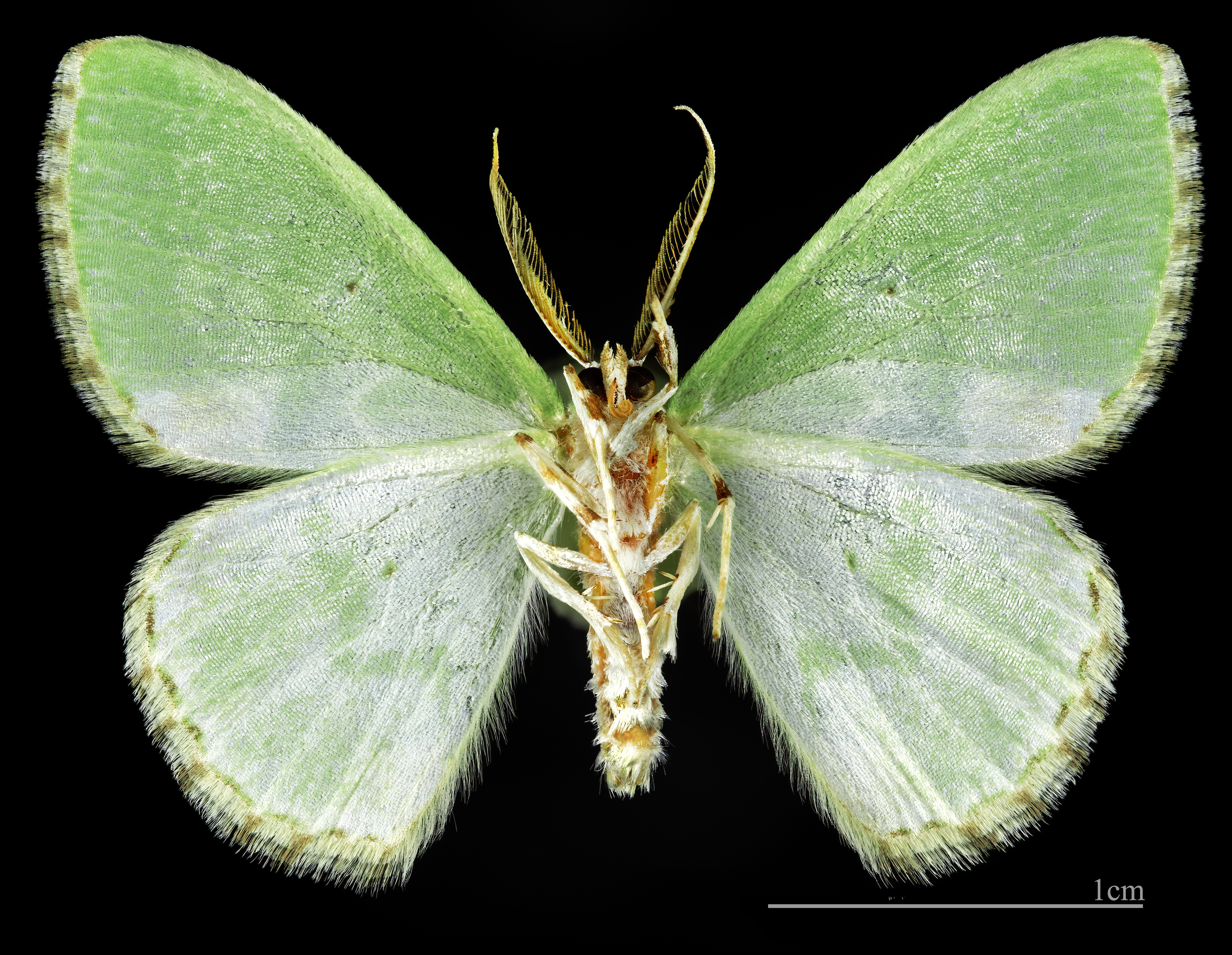
♂ △

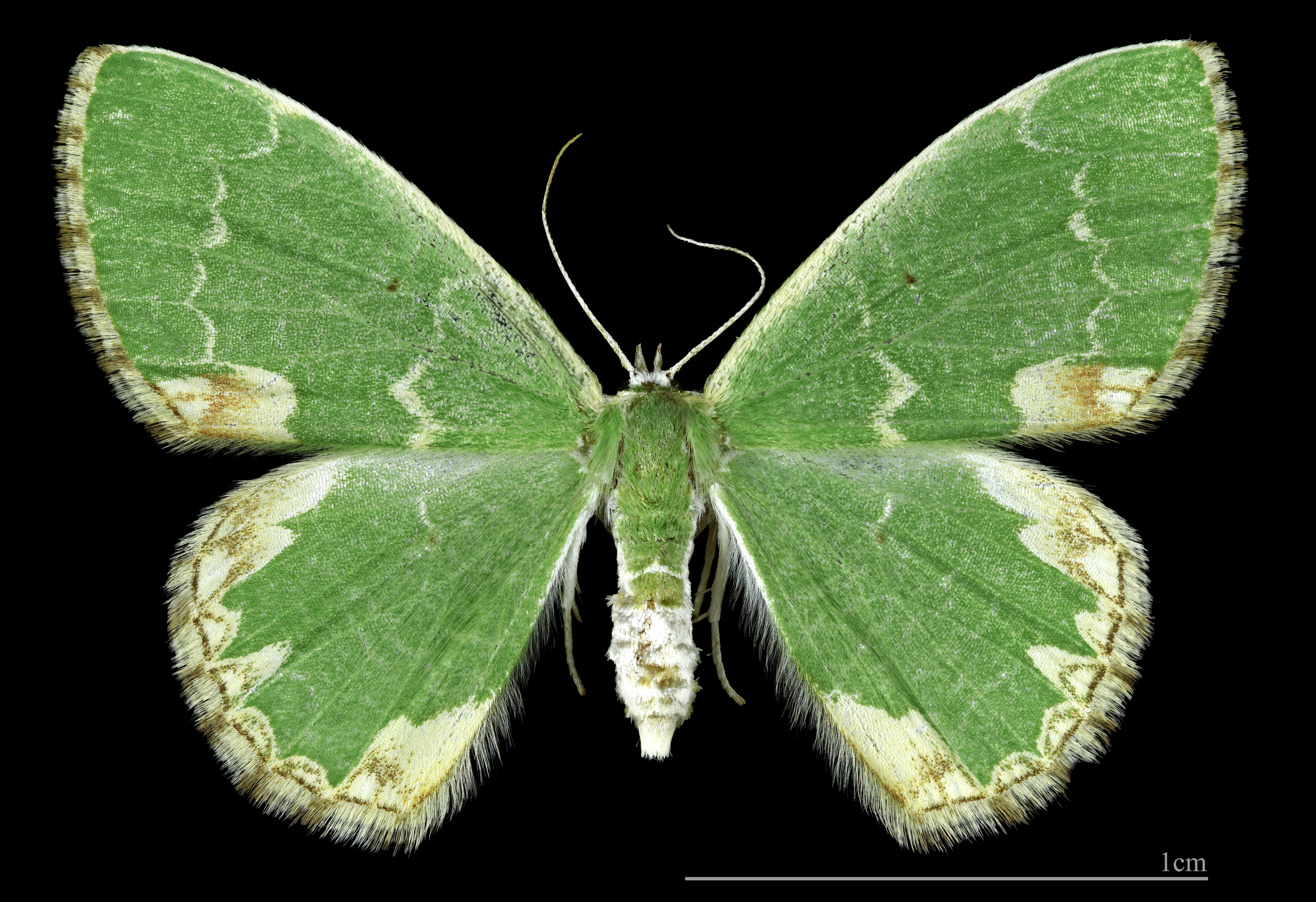
♀

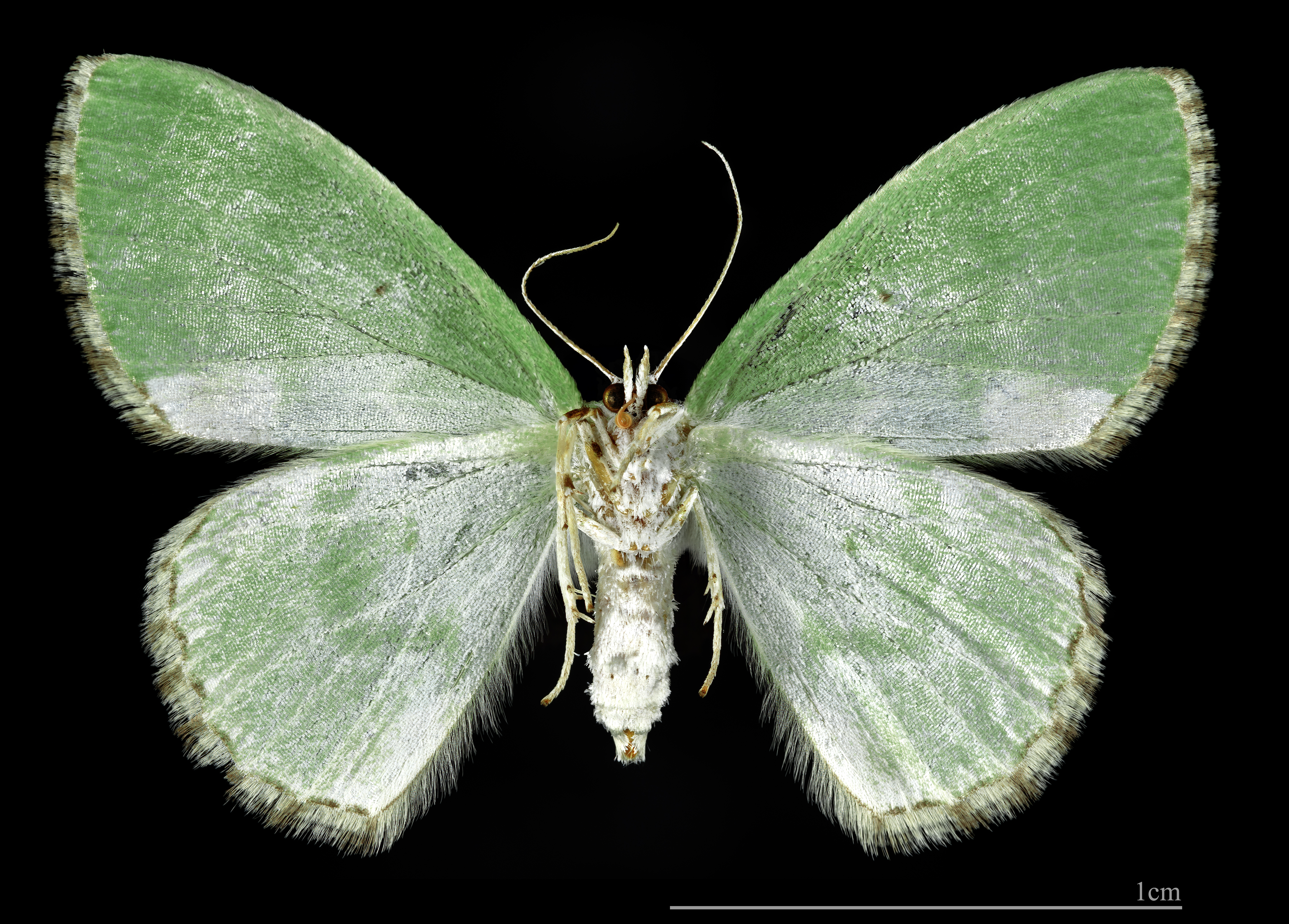
♀ △

== Larva ==
The larval food plant is oak. The insect overwinters as a larva. The body of the caterpillar larva is red brown, but it camouflages itself by attaching a screen of oak leaf fragments to its specially hooked bristles.

After overwintering, the attached camouflage changes and consists of bud scales from the oak tree. Hugh Cott compared the larva's use of "concealment afforded by masks of adventitious material" to military camouflage, pointing out that the "device is, of course, essentially the same as one widely practised during World War I for the concealment, not of caterpillars, but of caterpillar-tractors, [gun] battery positions, observation posts and so forth." The larva spins silk over one side of each piece to be attached, and then hooks the silk onto its bristles to keep the camouflage in place.

== Bibliography ==
- Chinery, Michael Collins Guide to the Insects of Britain and Western Europe 1986 (reprinted 1991)
- Skinner, Bernard The Colour Identification Guide to Moths of the British Isles 1984
