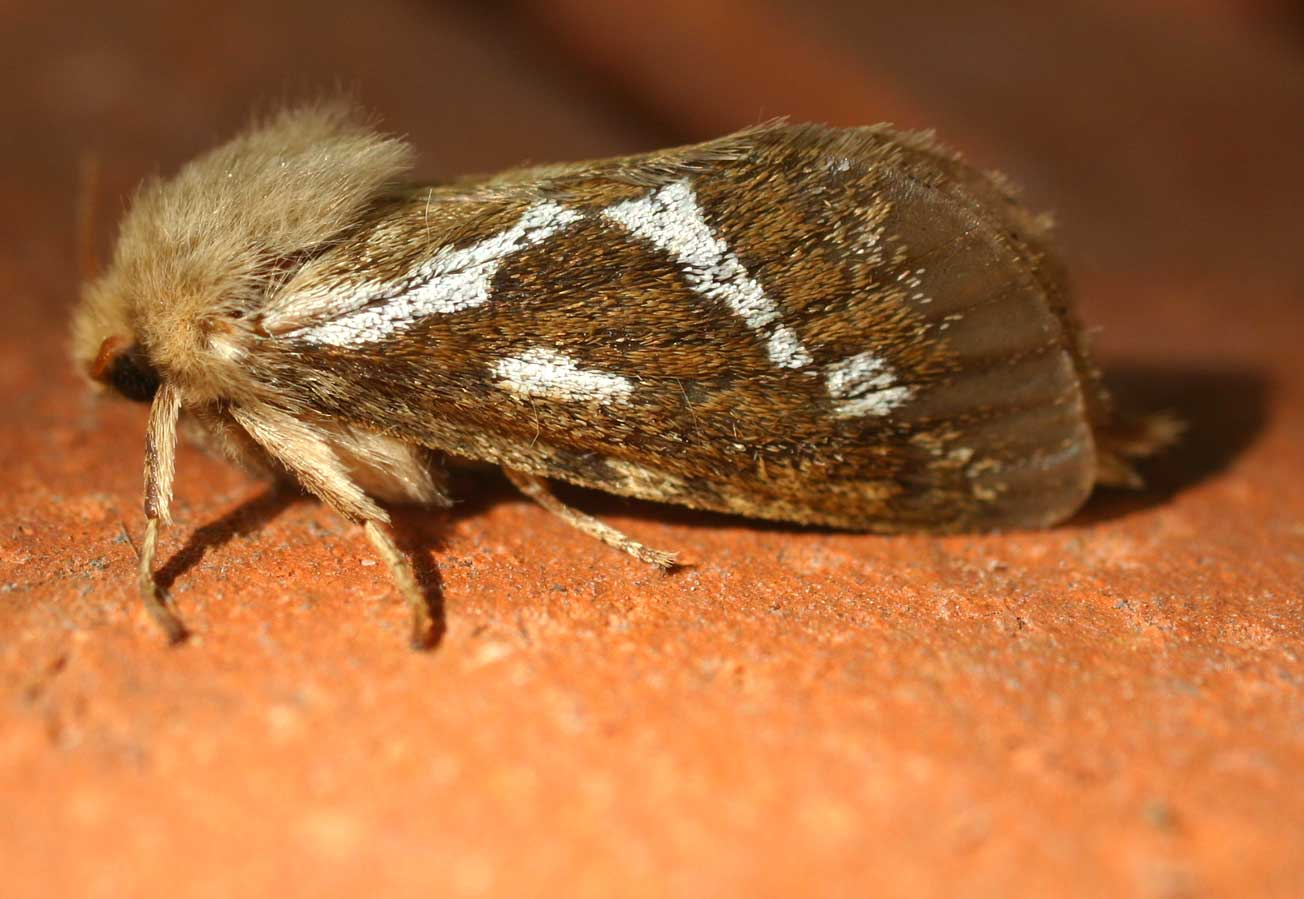

Scientific classification
- Kingdom: Animalia
- Phylum: Arthropoda
- Clade: Pancrustacea
- Class: Insecta
- Order: Lepidoptera
- Family: Hepialidae
- Genus: Korscheltellus
- Species: K. lupulina

Binomial name
- Korscheltellus lupulina (Linnaeus, 1758)

Synonyms
- Noctua lupulinus Linnaeus, 1758; Hepialus lupulinus (Linnaeus, 1758); Pharmacis lupulina (Linnaeus, 1758)

= Common swift moth =

Common swift

Species of moth

The common swift (Korscheltellus lupulina) is a moth of the family Hepialidae. It was previously placed in the genus Hepialus. It is a common, often abundant European species. The species was described by Carl Linnaeus in his 1758 10th edition of Systema Naturae.

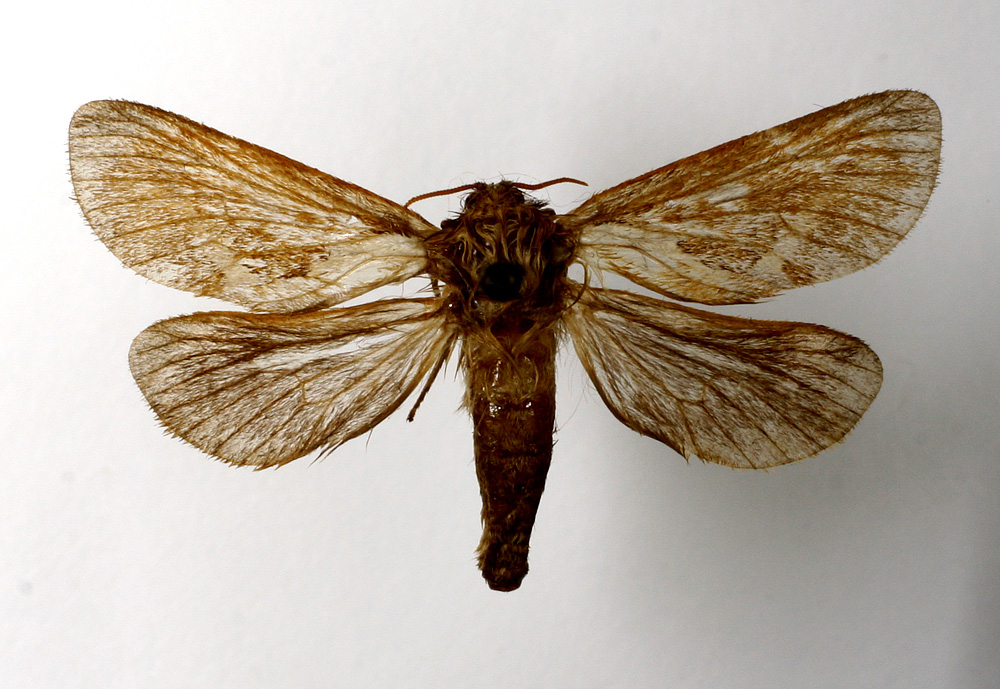
Mounted

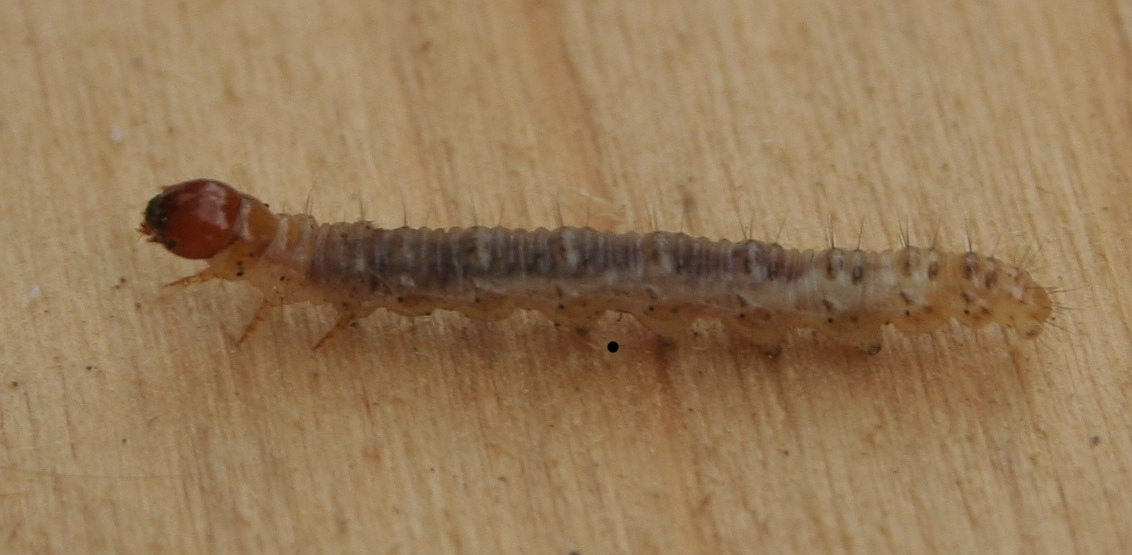
Caterpillar

== Description ==
The male has a wingspan of about 30 mm with dark brown forewings with white apical and basal streaks meeting to make a "V" shape with another spot close to the costa. The hindwings are plain brown. The female is larger (wingspan about 40 mm) with similar patterning to the male but generally paler and less distinct. Patterns on the moths are highly variable, ranging from whitish to grey to pale brown with the females slightly larger and less strongly marked. Some individuals of both sexes are plain buff or brown with no pattern. The moths do not have a proboscis, are unable to feed, and therefore, are not usually found at flowers.

The adults fly at dusk in May and June and the females broadcast the eggs, in a hovering flight, just above the vegetation. Males have a hovering flight. The species overwinters as a larva.

The orange swift (Triodia sylvina) and gold swift (Phymatopus hecta) look similar, although the orange swift flies later in the year.

=== Larvae ===
The larvae feed underground on the roots of a wide variety of plants (see list below) and can be an agricultural pest. They feed from July to April and when fully fed are 20 mm long with a shiny white body and brown head, prothoracic plate and pinacula. It pupates in a tunnel amongst the roots and uses the spines of the pupa to migrate to the surface, before emergence.

==== Recorded food plants ====
- Allium – garlic
- Apium - celery
- Brassica
- Chrysanthemum
- Dahlia
- Daucus – carrot
- Fragaria – strawberry
- Helianthus – Jerusalem artichoke
- Humulus – hop
- Lactuca – lettuce
- Lycopersicon – tomato
- Medicago – alfalfa
- Narcissus – daffodil
- Pastinaca – parsnip
- Phaseolus – bean
- Pisum – pea
- Poaceae – grasses
- Ribes – currant
- Rubus – berries
- Solanum – potato

== Etymology ==
Previously placed in the genus Hepialus – from the Greek; hēpialos – meaning a fever, as in 'the fitful, alternating flight' of the moth. It has since been allocated to the genus Korscheltellus. Carl Linnaeus originally gave the moth the specific name lupulinus in affinity with the ghost moth (Hepialus humuli). Humulus is the genus for hops and Linnaeus knew that the ghost moth fed on the roots of hops; he was not aware of the actual foodplant of the common swift.

== Notes ==
1. The flight season refers to the British Isles. This may vary in other parts of the range.

== Bibliography ==
- "Narcissus pests, 6th ed" (PDF). Ministry of Agriculture, Fisheries and Food Bulletin (51). 1970.
- Chinery, Michael (1986, reprinted 1991). Collins Guide to the Insects of Britain and Western Europe.
- Skinner, Bernard (1984). The Colour Identification Guide to Moths of the British Isles.
