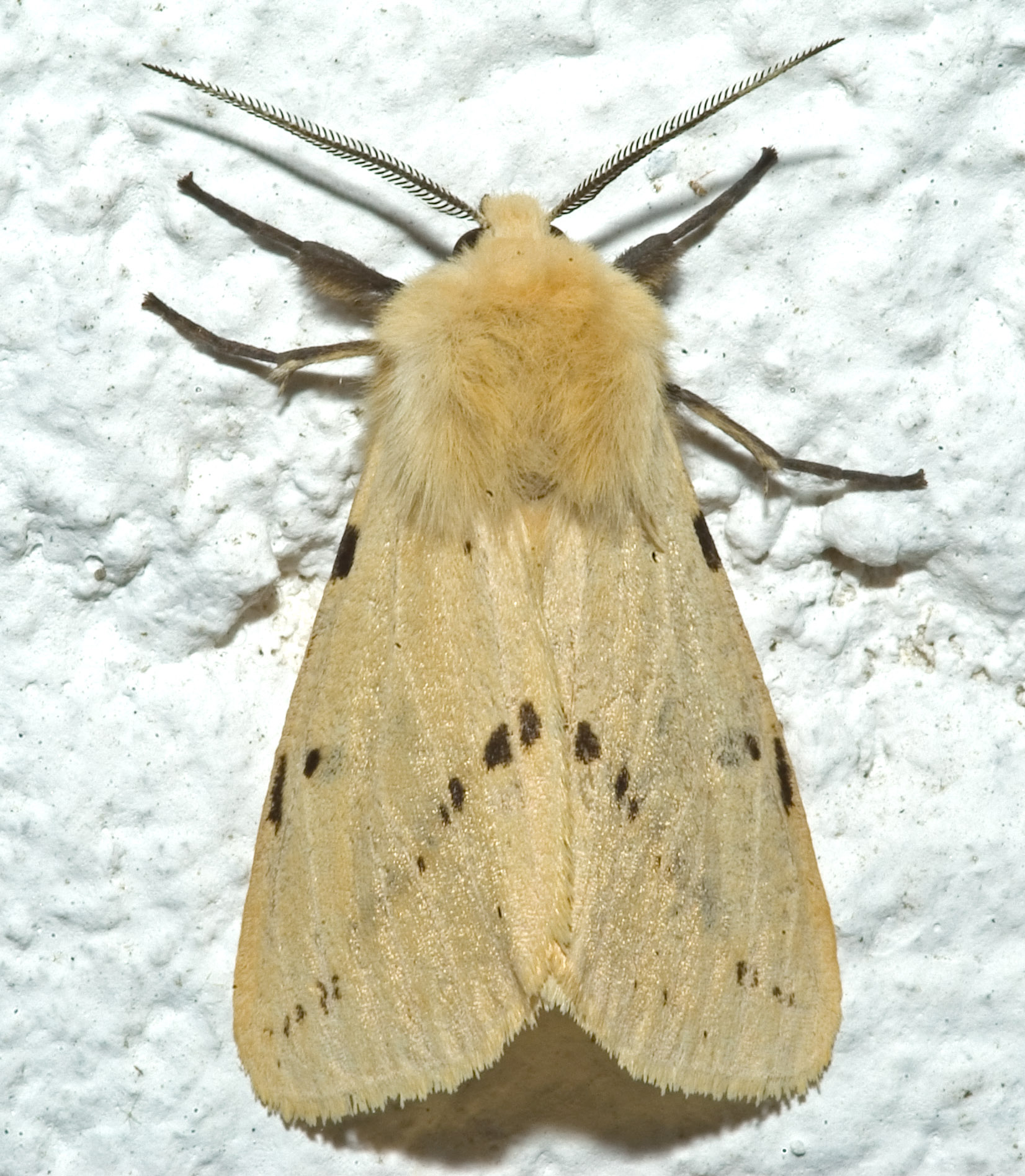

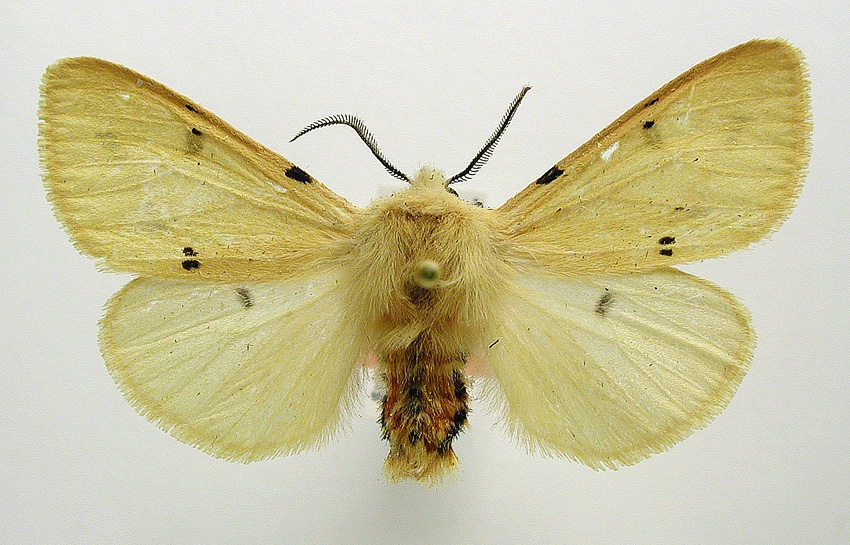

Scientific classification
- Domain: Eukaryota
- Kingdom: Animalia
- Phylum: Arthropoda
- Class: Insecta
- Order: Lepidoptera
- Superfamily: Noctuoidea
- Family: Erebidae
- Subfamily: Arctiinae
- Genus: Spilarctia
- Species: S. luteum

Binomial name
- Spilarctia luteum (Hufnagel, 1766)

Synonyms
- List: Phalaena lubricipeda lutea Hufnagel, 1766; Phalaena Bombyx zatima Stoll, 1782; Bombyx radiatus Haworth, 1812; Spilosoma lubricipeda hartigi Dannehl, 1928; Spilosoma lubricipedum reisseri Koutsaftikis, 1973; Diacrisia lutea japonica Rothschild, 1910; Spilarctia obliqua bergmani Bryk, 1942; Spilarctia obliqua ursulina Bryk, 1942; Diacrisia lutea rhododaktyla Bryk, 1948 [1949]; Spilosoma rhodosoma Turati, 1907; Spilosoma lutea; Spilosoma luteum

= Buff ermine =

Species of moth

The buff ermine (Spilarctia luteum) is a moth of the family Erebidae. It is sometimes placed in the genus Spilosoma. The species was first described by Johann Siegfried Hufnagel in 1766. It is found throughout the temperate belt of the Palearctic region south to northern Turkey, Georgia, Kazakhstan, southern Siberia (excluding Buryatia), eastern Mongolia, Amur Region, China, Korea and Japan.

The wings of this species are buffish yellow (the males tend to be more yellow than the females) and are typically marked with a diagonal row of dark spots on the forewing and a few other scattered spots on both forewings and hindwings. The extent of black markings varies considerably, however, from almost spotless examples to largely black melanic forms. The wingspan is 34–42 mm. The species flies from May to July in the British Isles. This may vary in other parts of the range. It is attracted to light.

The larva is pale brown and very hairy. It is polyphagous, feeding on a wide variety of trees, shrubs and herbaceous plants (see list). This species overwinters as a pupa.

== Recorded food plants ==
Some larval food plants include:

- Alnus – alder
- Mentha – mint
- Plantago – plantain
- Quercus – oak
- Rheum – rhubarb
- Ribes – currant
- Rubus – raspberry
- Rumex – dock/sorrel
- Senecio – ragwort
- Urtica – nettle
- Lonicera – honeysuckle
- Humulus – hops

== Subspecies ==
- Spilarctia lutea lutea
- Spilarctia lutea adzharica Dubatolov, 2007 (Georgia)
- Spilarctia lutea japonica (Rothschild, 1910) (Middle Amur, Primorye, southern Sakhalin, southern Kuril Islands, eastern China, Korea, Japan)
- Spilarctia lutea rhodosoma (Turati, 1907) Sicily, the black of the upperside is increased by a larger number of the spots; but especially distinguished by the bright red abdomen.

== Gallery ==
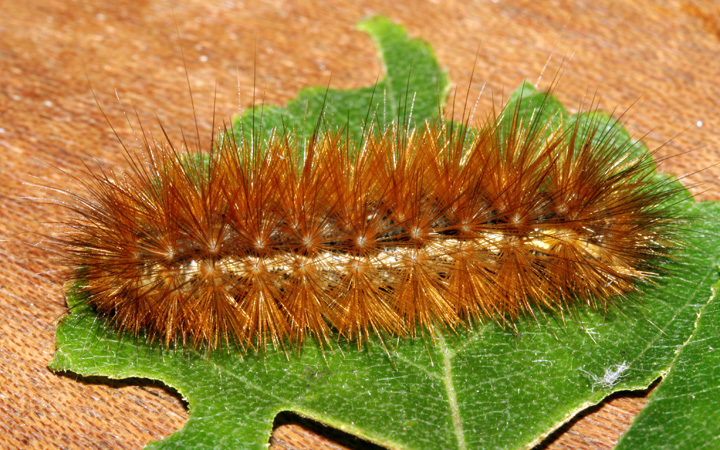
Buff ermine moth (Spilarctia luteum) caterpillar

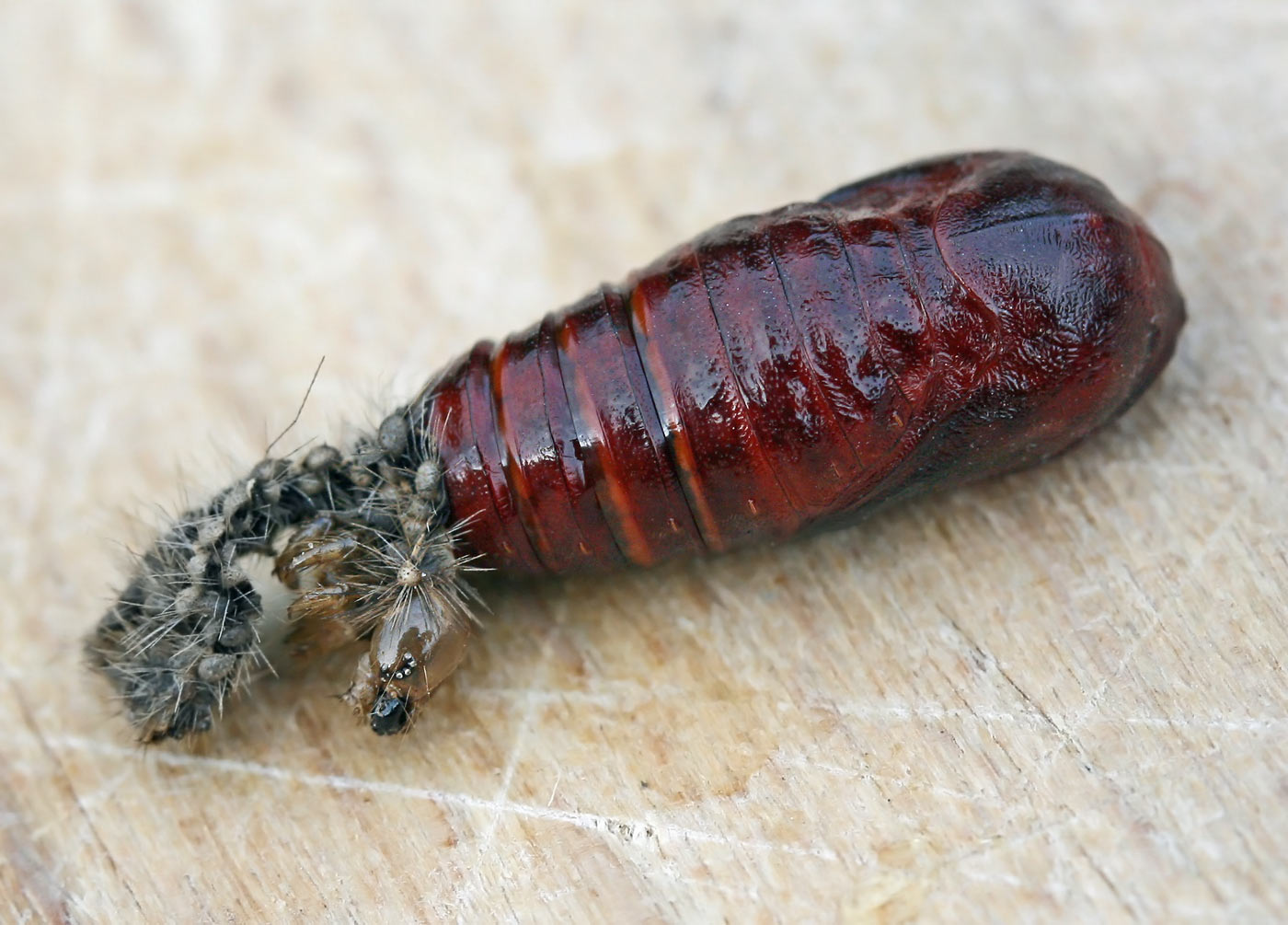
Pupa

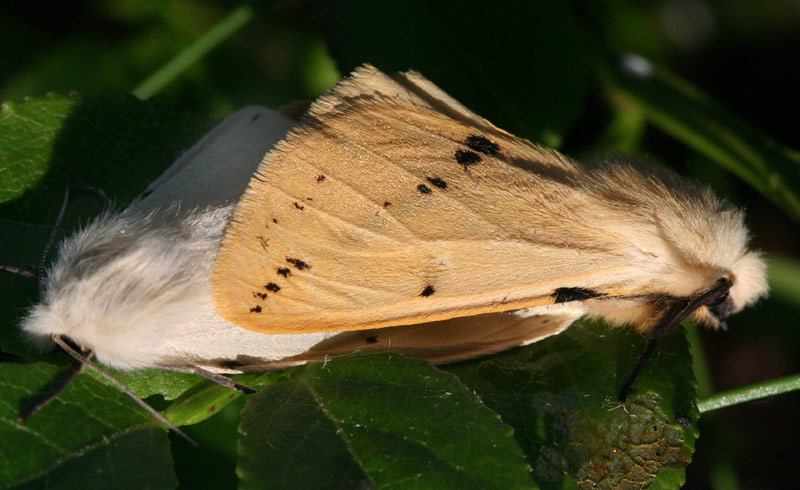
Pair of buff ermine moths

== References and notes ==
- Chinery, Michael (1991). Collins Guide to the Insects of Britain and Western Europe.
- Skinner, Bernard (1984). The Colour Identification Guide to Moths of the British Isles.
