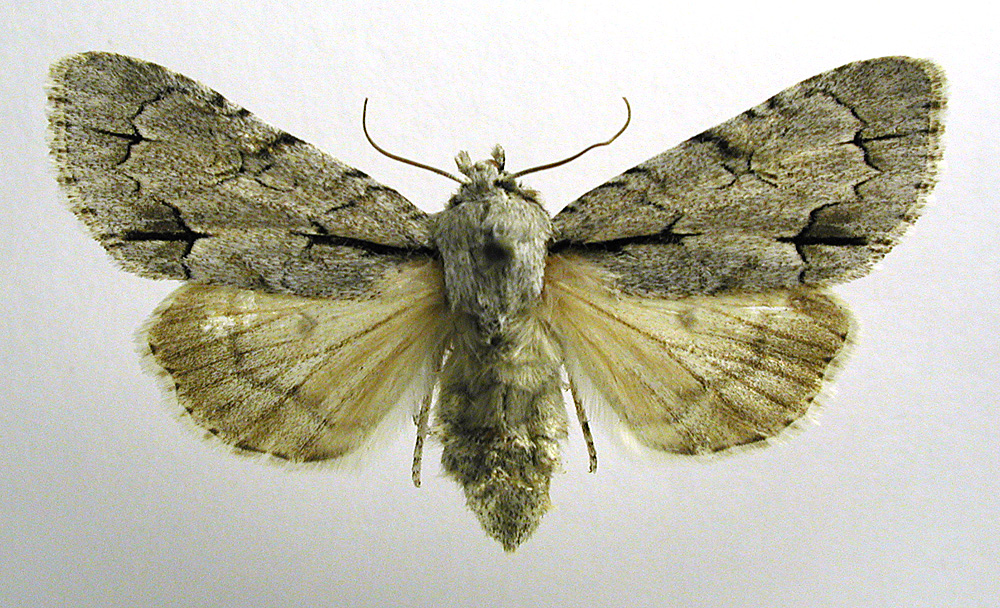

Scientific classification
- Kingdom: Animalia
- Phylum: Arthropoda
- Clade: Pancrustacea
- Class: Insecta
- Order: Lepidoptera
- Superfamily: Noctuoidea
- Family: Noctuidae
- Genus: Acronicta
- Species: A. tridens

Binomial name
- Acronicta tridens (Denis & Schiffermüller, 1775)

= Dark dagger =

Species of moth

The dark dagger (Acronicta tridens) is a moth of the family Noctuidae. The species was first described by Michael Denis and Ignaz Schiffermüller in 1775. It is distributed throughout Europe (from southern Fennoscandia to the Balkans and Italy), Turkey, the Near East, the European part of Russia, southern Siberia, the Ural, the Russian Far East (Primorye, southern Khabarovsk, southern Amur region and Sakhalin), the Korean Peninsula, China and Japan (Hokkaido).

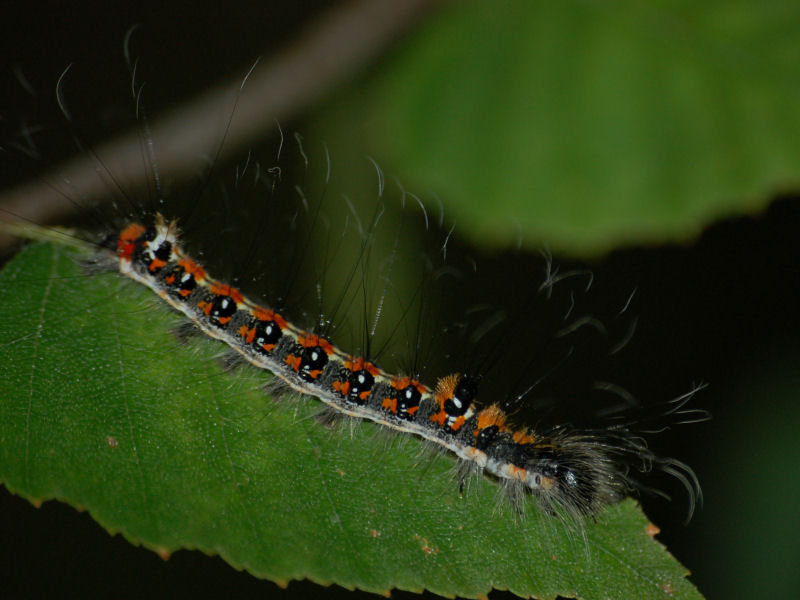

This species has grey forewings marked with bold black "daggers". The hindwings of the males are white, those of the females dirty grey. The wingspan is 35–43 mm (1.4–1.7 in). Adults of this species are extremely similar to the grey dagger (Acronicta psi). Despite the common name, the dark dagger is usually the paler of the two species and the white hindwings of the male are usually diagnostic. However, the only reliable way of distinguishing adults of the two species is by examination of the genitalia. The larvae, however, are very different. This species flies at night in June and July (Note: The flight season refers to the British Isles. This may vary in other parts of the range.) and is attracted to light and sometimes to sugar.

The larva is black, marked with red and white stripes, without the bold yellow markings and prominent horn of the larva of the grey dagger. It feeds on a variety of plants. The species overwinters as a pupa, sometimes spending two winters in this form.

== Recorded food plants ==
- Betula (birch)
- Caragana
- Crataegus (hawthorn)
- Malus (apple)
- Prunus
- Pyrus (pear)
- Rhamnus (buckthorn)
- Rosa (rose)
- Salix (willow)
- Sorbus (rowan)

== Bibliography ==
- Chinery, Michael (1991). Collins Guide to the Insects of Britain and Western Europe.
- Skinner, Bernard (1984). The Colour Identification Guide to Moths of the British Isles.
