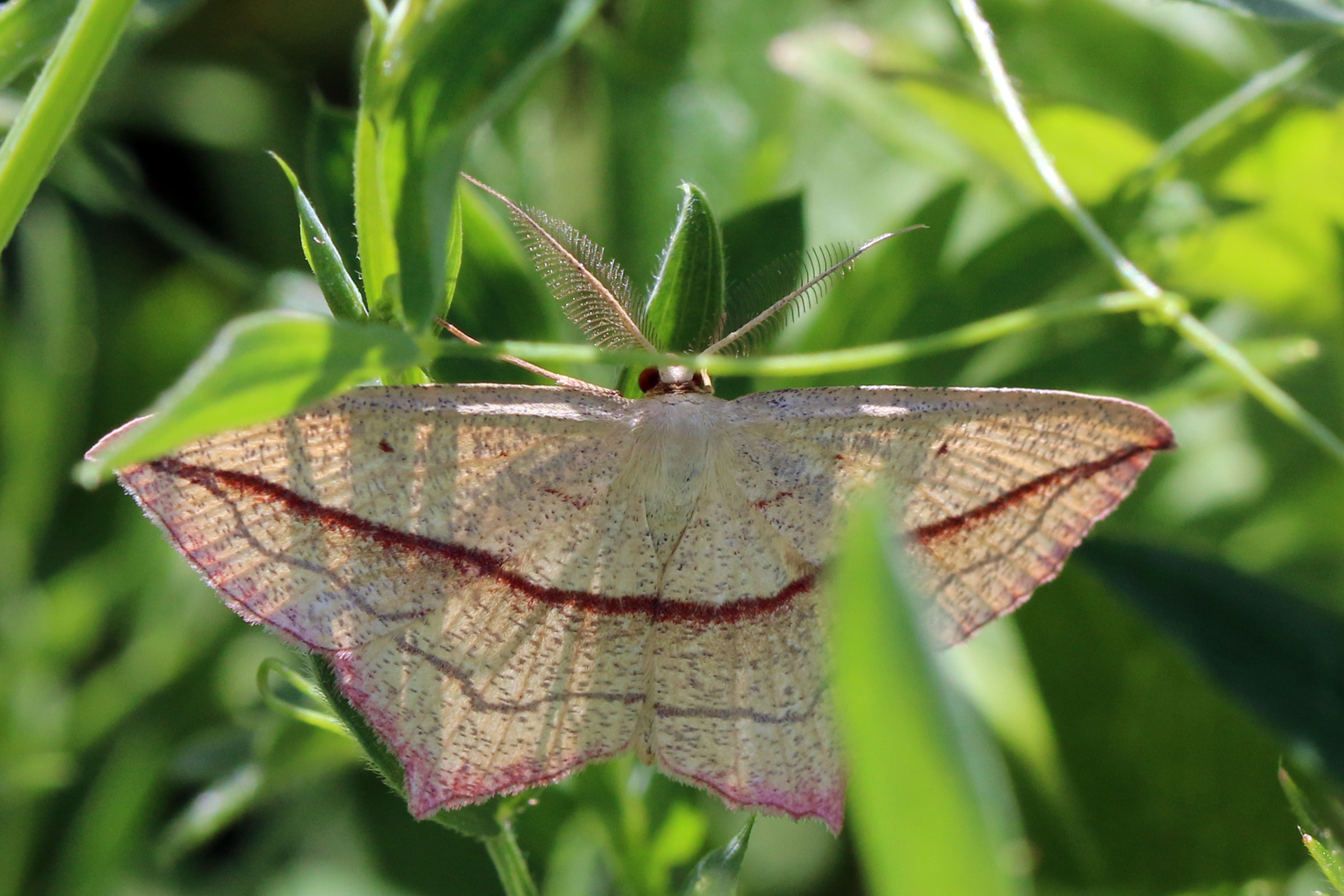

Scientific classification
- Domain: Eukaryota
- Kingdom: Animalia
- Phylum: Arthropoda
- Class: Insecta
- Order: Lepidoptera
- Family: Geometridae
- Genus: Timandra
- Species: T. comae

Binomial name
- Timandra comae Schmidt, 1931

= Blood-vein =

Species of moth

The blood-vein (Timandra comae) is a moth of the family Geometridae. The species was first described by Anton Schmidt in 1931.

== Distribution ==
It has a scattered distribution in western and central Europe north of the Alps. In the British Isles the distribution is patchy outside southern England and Wales. In far eastern Europe – east of a line running roughly from Finland through Estonia – it is replaced by its sister species Timandra griseata. The species were split in 1931, only to be subsequently re-merged by most authors. But since 1994, new research has come out in favour of treating them as distinct species.

== Description ==
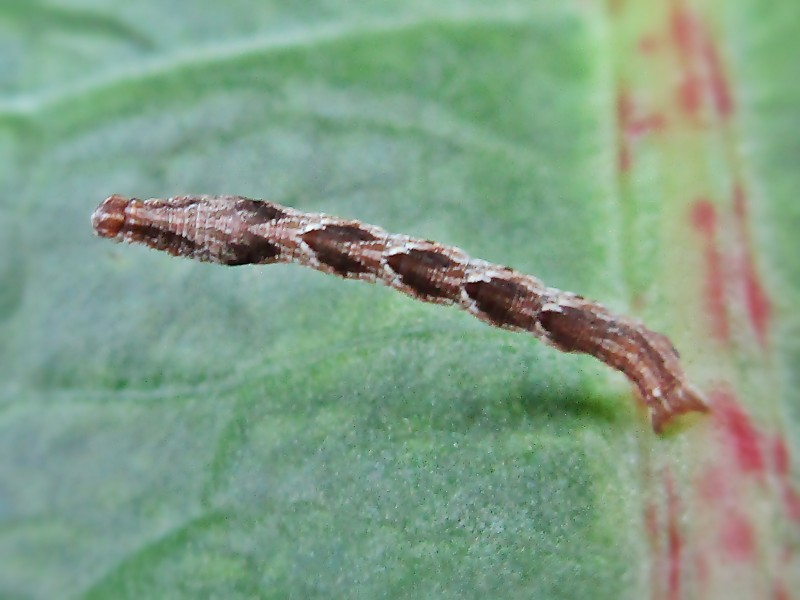
Caterpillar

The wings are cream coloured with bold red or purple fascia forming a diagonal stripe across forewings and hindwings. All wings are fringed with the same colour. The tornus of the hindwing is sharply angled giving a distinctive shape. The wingspan is 30–35 mm.

== Biology ==
Two broods are produced each year with the adults flying in May and June and again in August and September. (Note: The flight season refers to the British Isles. This varies in other parts of the range.) It flies at night and is attracted to light.

The larva is grey brown with darker spots on the back. In the UK, it feeds on the leaves of a variety of plants including dock, knotgrass, sorrel and various species of Atriplex. It overwinters as a larva.

== Bibliography ==
- Chinery, Michael (1986). Collins Guide to the Insects of Britain and Western Europe 1986 (Reprinted 1991)
- Õunap, Erki; Viidalepp, Jaan & Saarma, Urmas (2005). "Phylogenetic evaluation of the taxonomic status of Timandra griseata and T. comae (Lepidoptera: Geometridae: Sterrhinae)". European Journal of Entomology, 102: 607–615.
- Skinner, Bernard (1984). Colour Identification Guide to Moths of the British Isles 1984
