= Murder of Jermaine Goupall =

Murder of St. Joseph College student in London

Jermaine Goupall
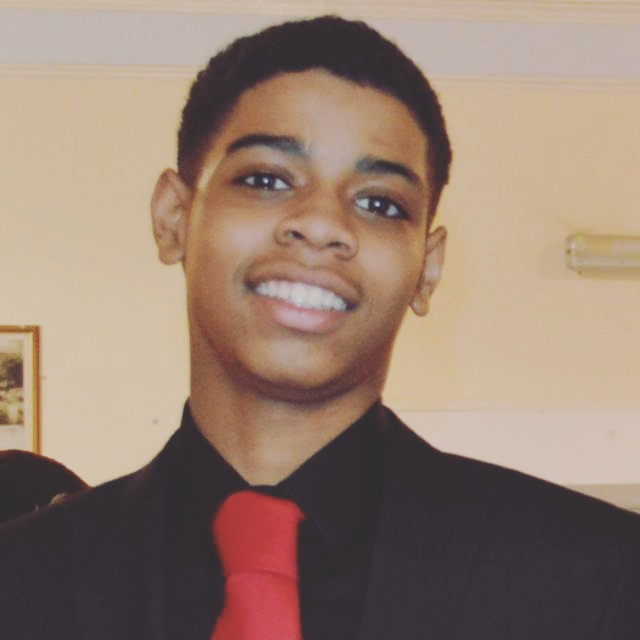
- Jermaine in 2017
- Born: 31 December 2001; Islington, London, England
- Died: 8 August 2017 (aged 15); Croydon, London, England
- Cause of death: Stabbing
- Known for: Murder victim by a gang
- Parent: Stanley Goupall
- Relatives: Tilisha Goupall

The murder of Jermaine Goupall occurred in South London on the evening of 8 August 2017. Jermaine, a 15-year-old student at St. Joseph's College, was stabbed by a group of teenagers in a premeditated attack. The crime was considered to be one of the worst incidents involving the use of knives and has been linked to drill music. The death was also 'foreshadowed' in a drill music video.

== Background ==
An aspiring architect and engineer, Jermaine Goupall who was also known as “Jetz” was a 15-year-old student at St. Joseph's College and attended Saturday school at Croydon Supplementary Education Project. He loved his cat, Happy, and was a member of a local swim club, where he was noted for his love of swimming.

During the summer holidays, after an evening with friends at a cinema, the group was ambushed by masked youths of the CR0 gang armed with knives in the Thornton Heath area of London.

Jermaine was stabbed seven times, with a fatal wound to the femoral artery of his right thigh. Despite efforts from bystanders and emergency and air ambulance service, Jermaine bled to death and was pronounced dead at the scene. The crime occurred less than 100 yards from his home.

Jermaine's court case gained heavy global and national attention due to the nature of his death and his age.

He was laid to rest on 29 September, 2017.

== Trial ==
On 8 January 2018, the trial for Jermaine's murder took place at the Old Bailey. Four out of the five youths were convicted on 14 February 2018, resulting in three of the offenders – Adam Benzahi, Samuel Oliver-Rowland and Junior Simpson – being sentenced to a total of 72 years for premeditated murder.

Jermaine's case set precedence as the court case was one of the first cases using YouTube and Snapchat videos as evidence against perpetrators.

On the first day of the trial, the court was told that Saskia Haye-Elliot – another female youth charged for the murder – said she thought the group were only going to "annoy or irate" members of the CR7 gang by taking videos of them to post on Snapchat and YouTube. Haye-Elliot contributed substantially to Jermaine's murder, it was evidenced in court that she had coordinated the pre-mediated attack on anyone they found. The court case highlighted the links between social media and knife crime.

Though Jermaine was not a member of the CR7 gang, he was assumed to be a member by the offenders because he lived in the area.

During the trial, Simpson said he was not aware that anyone was hurt until the three other passengers in the car returned. He also denied prior knowledge of a planned attack, stating he was unaware of the presence of knives, masks or balaclavas in the car. All of the offenders stated that they never knew who he was and never had an issue with him. Extensive details about what happened to Jermaine that fatal night were highlighted in court, bringing to light that the offenders were looking for anyone they believed to be in the opposing gang.

== Aftermath ==
Jermaine's death received international attention and opened a conversation on the impact of drill music and the increase of knife crime across London. Jermaine Goupall's case was influential since it was one of the first cases to highlight YouTube and drill music as evidence for murder. After Jermaine's trial, Director of Public Prosecutions Max Hill stated that "violent social media posts must be used by prosecutors to crack down on gangs." Goupall's death has been a point of reference for calls to ban and sanction music that may initiate a threat of violence.

Jermaine's death is covered in the Channel 5 show Gangland, a show that covers London's gangs and their recruitment of minors. Another documentary which highlighted the murder was the 5Star series When Teens Kill. In addition, the BBC produced two videos covering Jermaine's death.

In April 2018, the Goupall family criticized YouTube because videos by the gang that killed Jermaine were still accessible.

In October 2019, Jermaine's father, Stanley Goupall, was invited on the Victoria Derbyshire show, along with other men who had lost a son or brother to knife crime. The episode included a short film entitled "Men who lost loved ones to knife crime", which was nominated for a BAFTA Award in 2020.

His family have started a knife crime awareness charity, the JFJ Foundation, who work in educating young people across the United Kingdom about the dangers of knife and gang violence.
