= Acratodes =

Scientific classification
- Kingdom: Animalia
- Phylum: Arthropoda
- Class: Insecta
- Order: Lepidoptera
- Family: Geometridae
- Tribe: Timandrini
- Genus: Acratodes; Guenée, 1857

Genus of geometer moths

Acratodes is a genus of moths in the family Geometridae erected by Achille Guenée in 1857. It is considered a synonym of Xystrota by some sources.

== Species ==
- Acratodes phakellurata Guenée, 1857
- Acratodes suavata (Hulst, 1900)
- Acratodes virgotus (Schaus)
