= K. gracilis =

K. gracilis may refer to:

- Kniphofia gracilis, a flowering plant species in the genus Kniphofia
- Korscheltellus gracilis, the conifer swift, a moth species

== See also ==
- Gracilis (disambiguation)
