= British Plant Gall Society =

- Formation: 1985; 41 years ago
- Type: Constituted Charity
- Location: UK
- Key people: Tommy Root, Chair
- Affiliations: British Entomological and Natural History Society
- Website: britishplantgallsociety.org

The British Plant Gall Society is a voluntary organisation which encourages cecidology, the study of plant galls, in the British Isles. It was formed in 1985. Its biannual journal, Cecidology, is currently edited by Paul Smith. Previous editors include Michael Chinery.

== Notable people ==
- Michael Chinery
- Margaret Hutchinson
- Margaret Redfern
- Peter Shirley
- Brian Spooner

== Publications ==
- Redfern, Margaret; Shirley, Peter; Bloxham, Michael (2011). British Plant Galls (2 ed.). Field Studies Council/British Plant Gall Society. ISBN 978-1851532841.
- Chinery, Michael (2011). Britain's Plant Galls a Photographic Guide. Wildguides /British Plant Gall Society. ISBN 978-190365743-0.
- Simon, Randolph (2005). The Natural History of the Rose Bedeguar Gall and Its Insect Community. British Plant Gall Society. ISBN 0-9511582-2-8.
