= Kenna Gallagher =

British Foreign Office official and diplomat

- Born: Francis George Kenna Gallagher; 25 May 1917; London, United Kingdom
- Died: 19 April 2011 (aged 93)
- Occupation: Diplomat

Francis George Kenna Gallagher CMG (25 May 1917 – 19 April 2011) was a British Foreign Office official and diplomat.

== Early life and education ==
Gallagher was born in London on 25 May 1917 to a middle-class Roman Catholic family. He attended St Joseph's College, Upper Norwood, and passed the University of London matriculation exam in 1933, gaining a place to study Law at King's College London. After graduating, Gallagher took a job as a clerical officer in the Ministry of Agriculture. He was promoted to a junior executive officer in August 1938, but then transferred to the Inland Revenue and was made an assistant examiner. After the outbreak of the Second World War, Gallagher enlisted in the RAF and joined Bomber Command as a Flight Lieutenant in 1941.

== Diplomatic career ==
Gallagher took the diplomatic service entrance exam immediately after being discharged in 1945 and joined the service in November of that year. His first overseas posting was as Vice-Consul in Marseilles (1946–1948). After this, he was promoted to Second Secretary and Grade Seven in the diplomatic service and transferred to the Paris embassy in 1948. Gallagher was moved back to the Foreign Office in London in 1950. He was promoted to First Secretary and sent to the British embassy in Damascus in 1953, acting as chargé d'affaires until 1955.

In January 1956, Gallagher was promoted to Counsellor and made Head of the Mutual Aid Department in the Foreign Office, later renamed the European Economic Organisations Department in 1960. In this capacity he was intimately involved in Britain's first unsuccessful application to join the European Common Market under Harold Macmillan. In 1963, he was transferred to the embassy in Berne, before being moved back to London in 1965 to become Head of the Western Economic Department in the Commonwealth Office. In 1967 he became Head of the Common Market Department for a year before being promoted to Assistant Under-Secretary of State for economic affairs at the Foreign and Commonwealth Office in 1968. His final posting was as British ambassador to the Organisation for Economic Co-operation and Development (OECD) in Paris, 1971–1977.

== Later life ==
After his retirement, Gallagher became a consultant on international trade policy for the Confederation of British Industry (1978–1980). He moved to the small village of Kirkwhelpington, near Morpeth in Northumberland, where he maintained his lifelong love of classical music. Gallagher never married and had no children. He died on 19 April 2011, aged 93 and was buried in the graveyard at Cambo, which is a neighbouring village to Kirkwhelpington. He was survived by his manservant, Jack Young.

== Honours ==
- Appointed Companion of the Order of St Michael and St George (CMG) in the 1963 New Year Honours.
