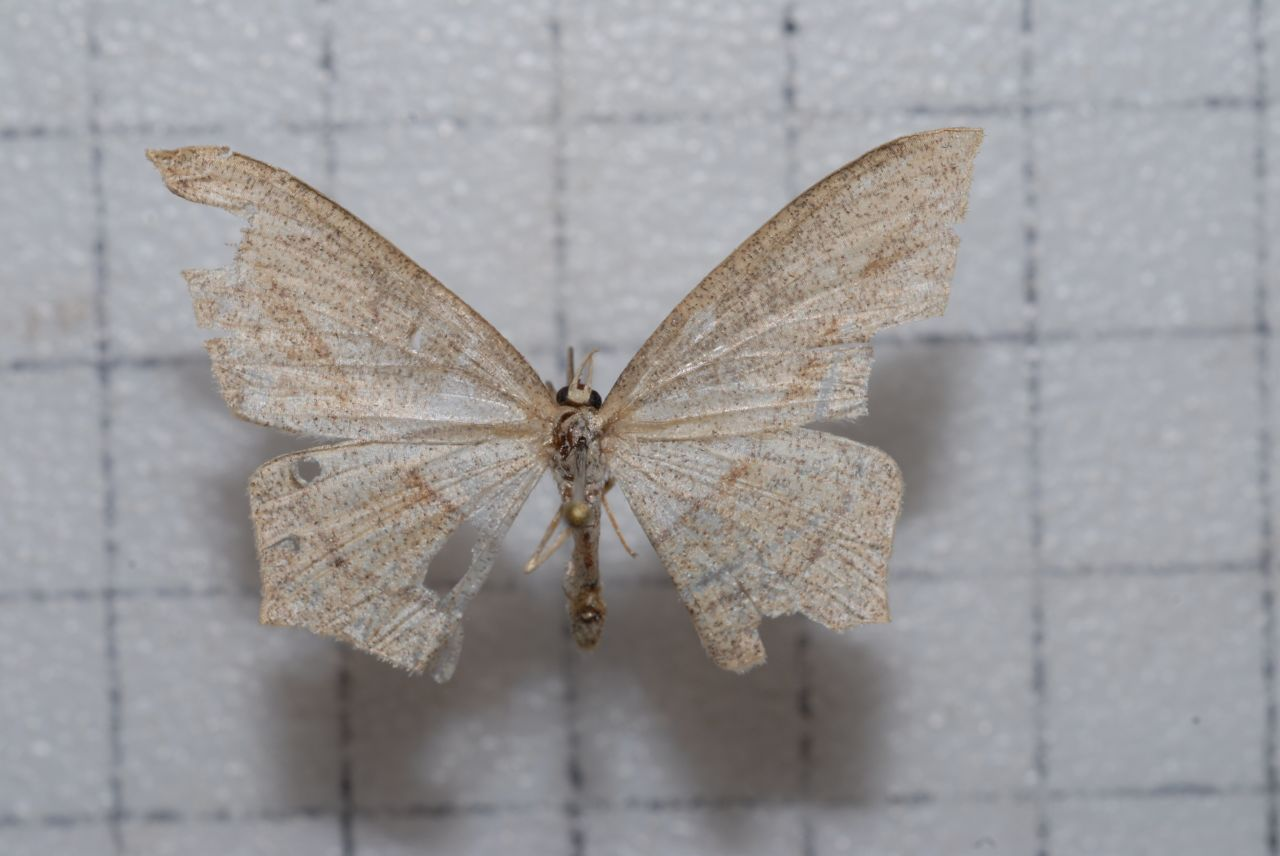

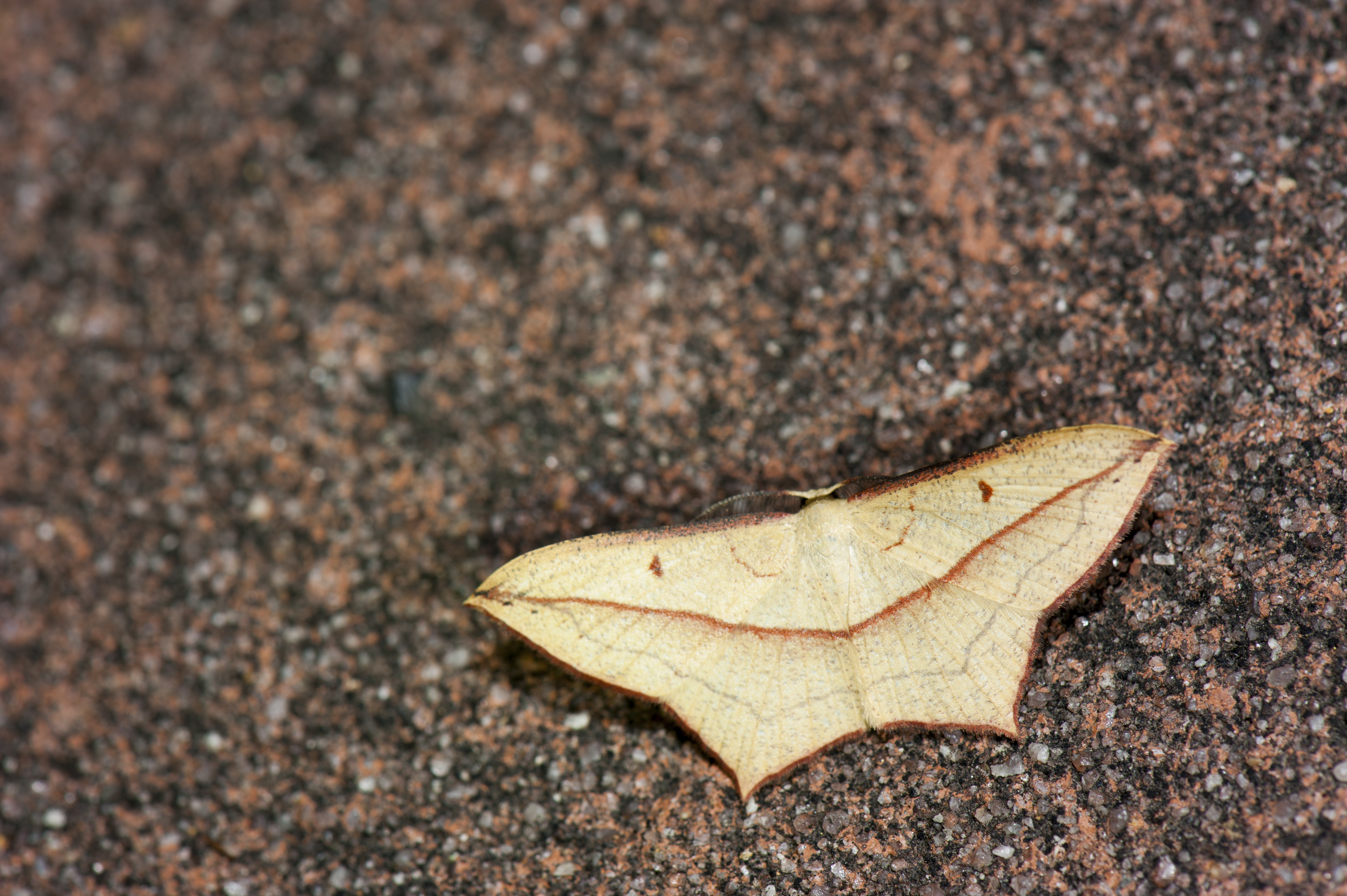

Scientific classification
- Kingdom: Animalia
- Phylum: Arthropoda
- Class: Insecta
- Order: Lepidoptera
- Family: Geometridae
- Genus: Timandra
- Species: T. convectaria

Binomial name
- Timandra convectaria Walker, 1861

Synonyms
- Calothysanis baguionis Prout, 1938

= Timandra convectaria =

Species of moth

Timandra convectaria is a species of moth of the family Geometridae first described by Francis Walker in 1861. It is found in Taiwan and China.

The larvae feed on Polygonum perfoliatum.

== Subspecies ==
- Timandra convectaria convectaria
- Timandra convectaria baguionis (Prout, 1938)
