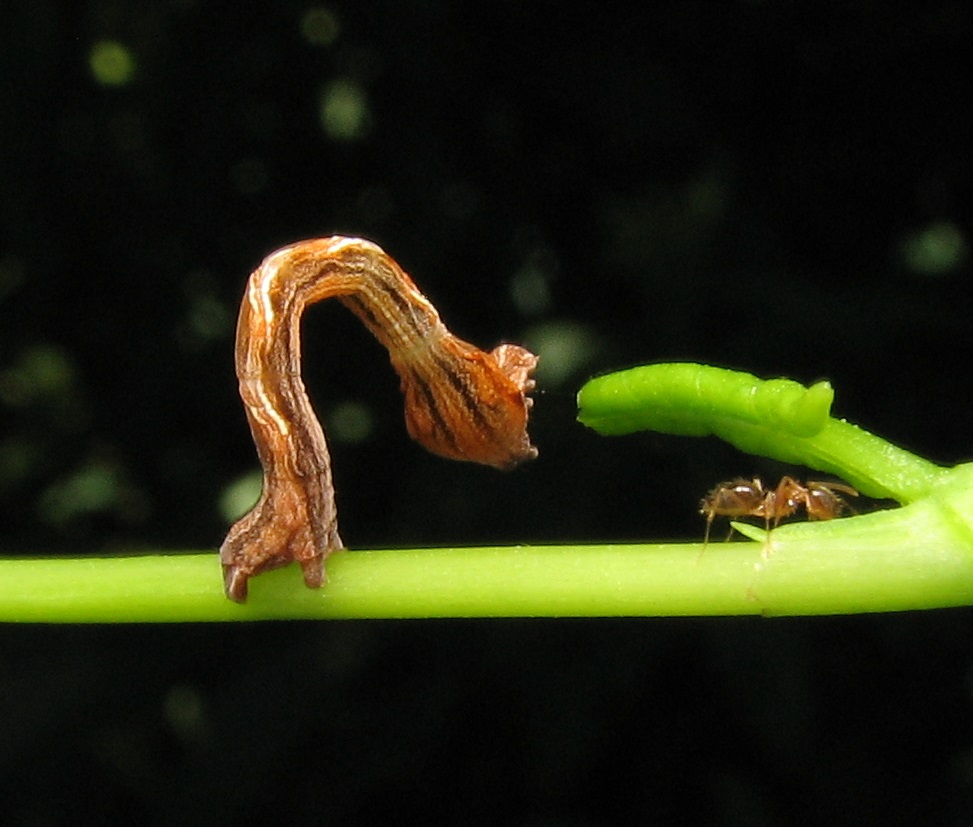
- Timandra amaturaria, caterpillar mid instar

Scientific classification
- Kingdom: Animalia
- Phylum: Arthropoda
- Clade: Pancrustacea
- Class: Insecta
- Order: Lepidoptera
- Family: Geometridae
- Subfamily: Sterrhinae
- Tribe: Timandrini; Stephens, 1850

Synonyms
- Calothysanini Herbulot, 1963

= Timandrini =

Tribe of moths

Timandrini is a tribe of geometer moths (family Geometridae), with about 45 species in four genera. It was described by Stephens in 1850.

== Genera ==
- Haematopis Hübner, 1823
- Synegiodes Swinhoe, 1892
- Timandra Duponchel, 1829
- Traminda Saalmuller, 1891
