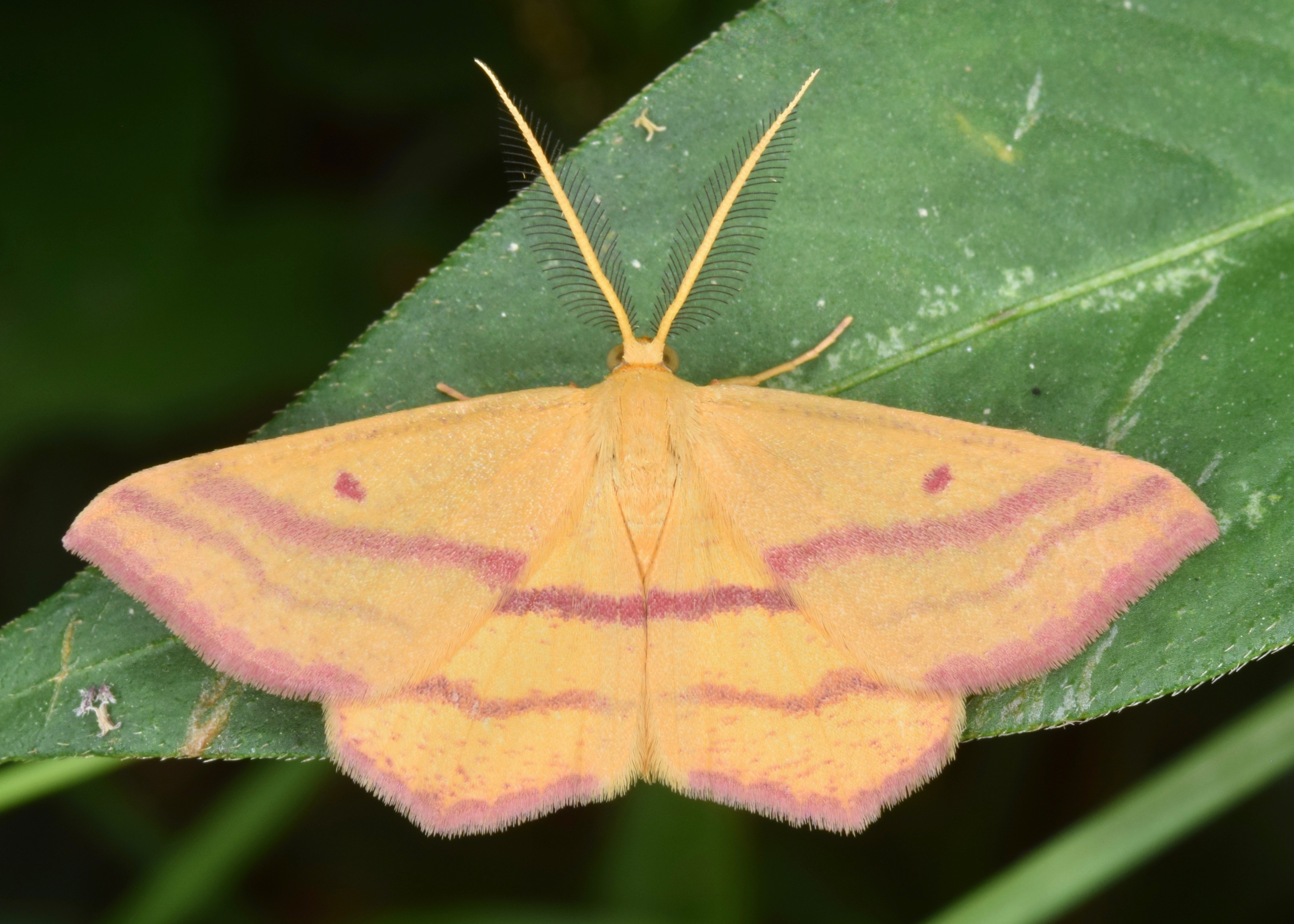

Scientific classification
- Kingdom: Animalia
- Phylum: Arthropoda
- Clade: Pancrustacea
- Class: Insecta
- Order: Lepidoptera
- Family: Geometridae
- Subfamily: Sterrhinae
- Tribe: Timandrini
- Genus: Haematopis; Hübner, 1823
- Species: H. grataria

Binomial name
- Haematopis grataria (Fabricius, 1798)

Synonyms
- Phalaena grataria Fabricius, 1798

= Haematopis =

Genus of moths

Haematopis is a monotypic moth genus in the family Geometridae erected by Jacob Hübner in 1823. Its only species, Haematopis grataria, the chickweed geometer, was first described by Johan Christian Fabricius in 1823. It is found throughout the United States. In Canada it is found from Quebec to Alberta, north to the Northwest Territories.

The wingspan is 20–25 millimeters (0.79–0.98 in). Adults are on wing from May to October. It is a day-flying species.

The larvae feed on various low-growing plants, including Stellaria, Polygonum and clover.

== Description ==
Adults of this species rest with their wings held out flat and to their sides. Their wings are a pale yellow, and their forewings each have a small red or pink spot in the center. Both the forewings and the hindwings each have two pink or red bands, which appear to be continuous across both sets of wings when the moth is in its resting position. Male chickweed geometers have feathered antennae, while females have thinner, thread-like antennae.
