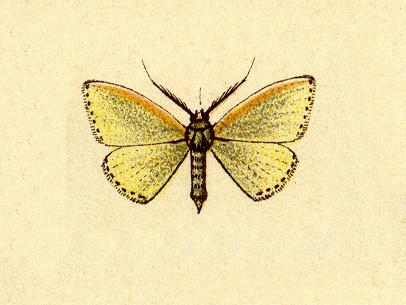

Scientific classification
- Kingdom: Animalia
- Phylum: Arthropoda
- Class: Insecta
- Order: Lepidoptera
- Family: Geometridae
- Genus: Acratodes
- Species: A. phakellurata

Binomial name
- Acratodes phakellurata Guenee, 1857

Synonyms
- Xystrota phakellurata

= Acratodes phakellurata =

Species of moth

Acratodes phakellurata is a moth of the family Geometridae first described by Achille Guenée in 1857. It is found on Hispaniola and Jamaica.
