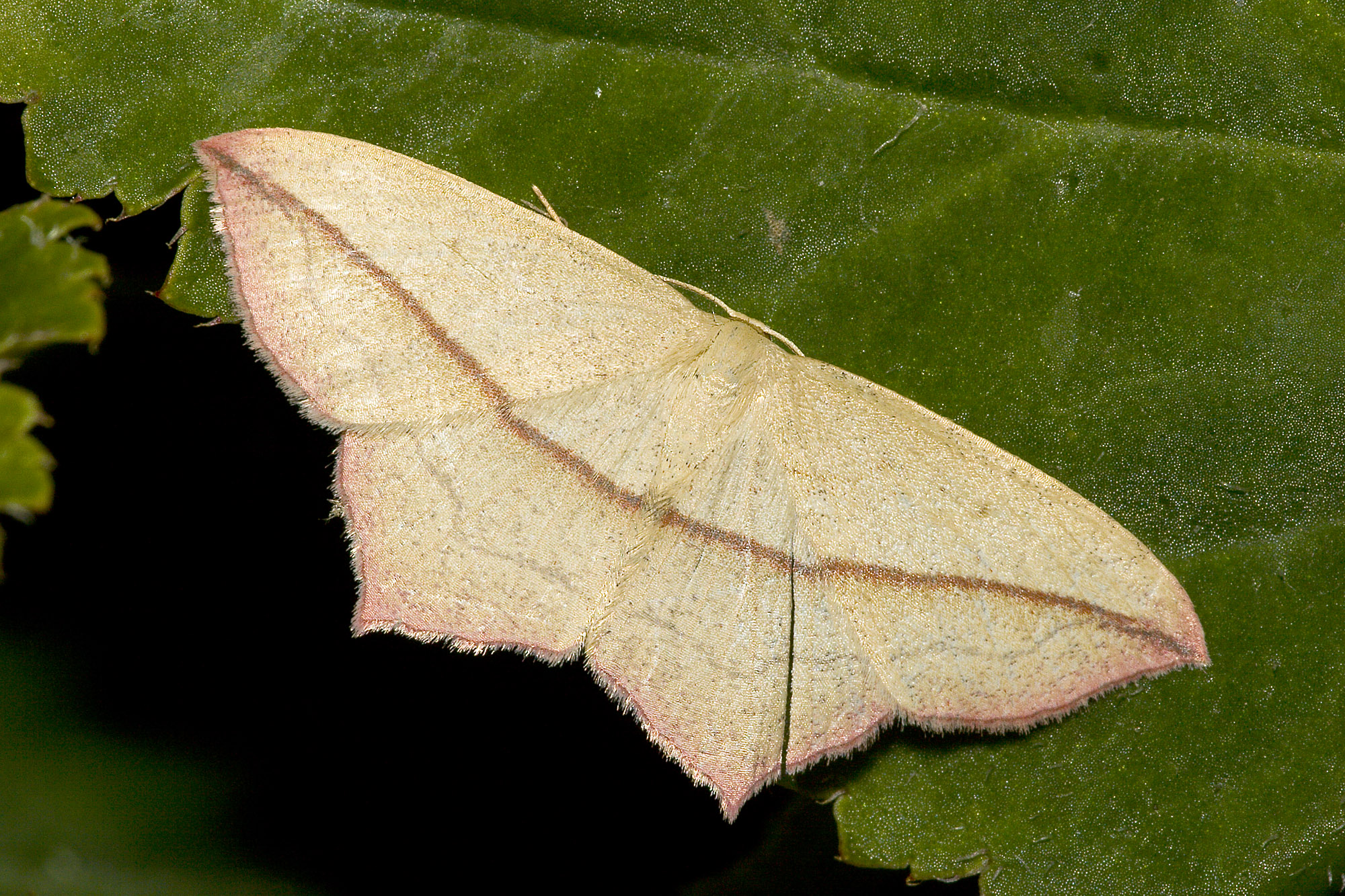
- The blood-vein moth, Timandra comae

Scientific classification
- Domain: Eukaryota
- Kingdom: Animalia
- Phylum: Arthropoda
- Class: Insecta
- Order: Lepidoptera
- Family: Geometridae
- Tribe: Timandrini
- Genus: Timandra; Duponchel, 1829

Synonyms
- Bradyepetes Stephens, 1831; Bradypetes Agassiz, 1847

= Timandra (moth) =

Genus of moths

Timandra is a genus of moths in the family Geometridae first described by Philogène Auguste Joseph Duponchel in 1829.

== Taxonomy ==
Timandra was raised by Duponchel and is taken from Greek mythology and is named after the daughter of Tyndareus and Leda.

== Description ==
Palpi not reaching beyond the frons. Antennae of male bipectinate (comb like on both sides). Apex simple. Hind tibia of male with two spur pairs. Forewings with acute and produced apex. Vein 3 from near angle of cell and vein 5 from somewhat above middle of discocellulars. Veins 7, 8 and 9 stalked. Vein 10 anastomosing (fusing) with veins 8 and 9 to form the areole. Hindwings with produced outer margin to a point at vein 4, veins 6 and 7 from angle of cell.

== Species ==
- Timandra amaturaria Walker, 1866
- Timandra apicirosea (Prout, 1935)
- Timandra comae Schmidt, 1931
- Timandra commixta Warren, 1895
- Timandra comptaria (Walker, 1863)
- Timandra convectaria Walker, 1861
- Timandra dichela (Prout, 1935)
- Timandra extremaria Walker, 1861
- Timandra griseata Petersen, 1902
- Timandra paralias (Prout, 1935)
- Timandra recompta (Prout, 1930)
- Timandra rectistrigaria (Eversmann, 1851)
- Timandra synthaca (Prout, 1938)

== Gallery of caterpillars of T. amaturaria ==
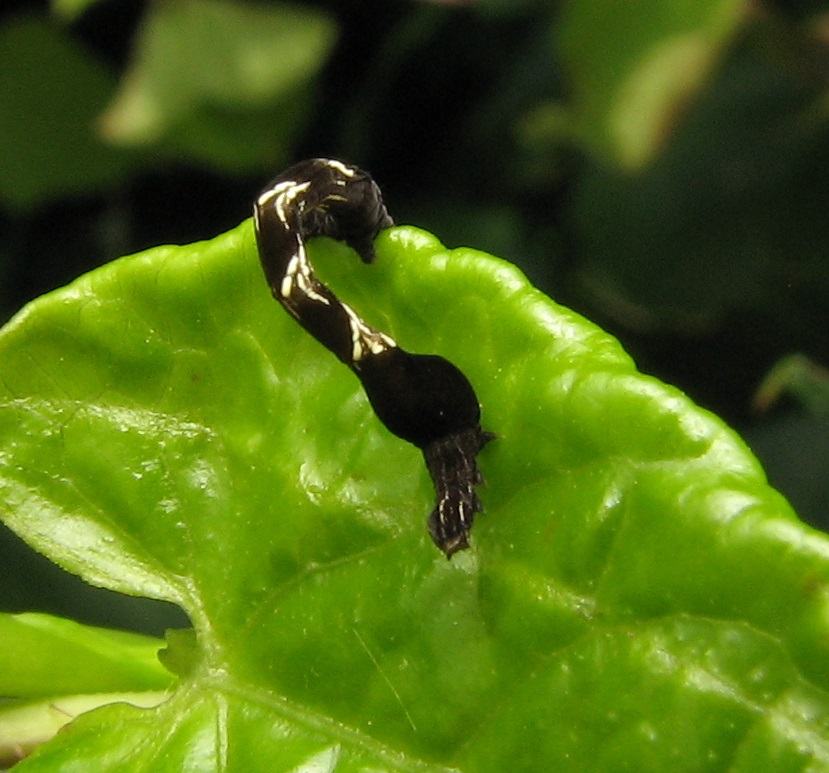
Early instar

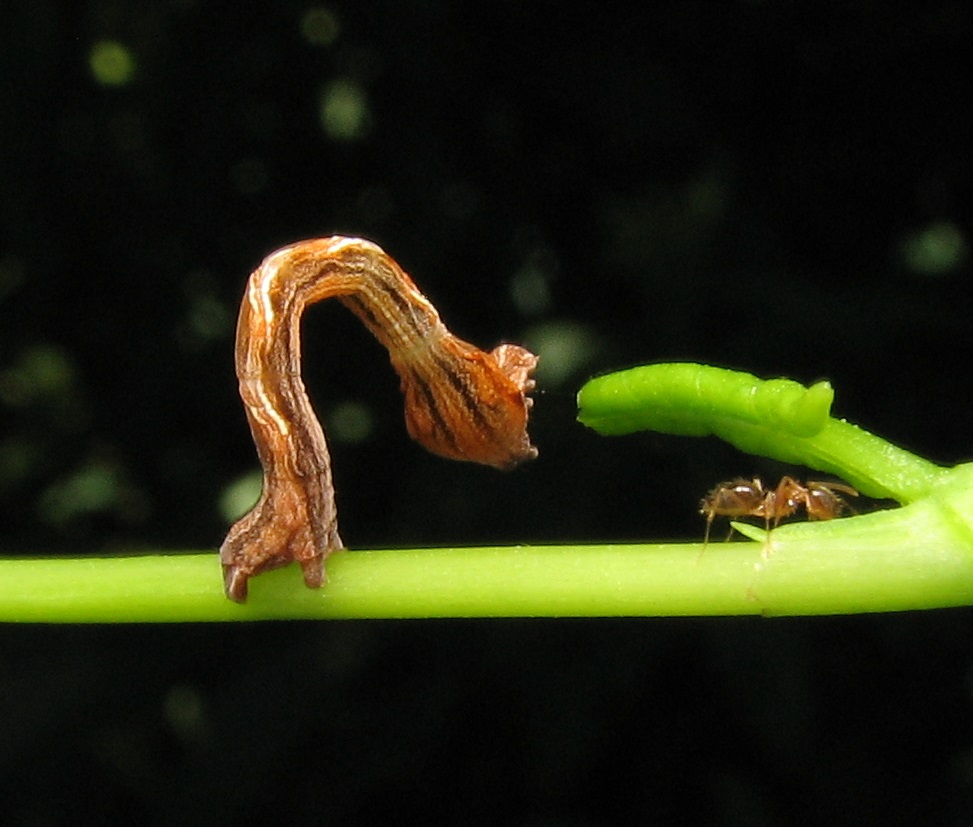
Mid instar

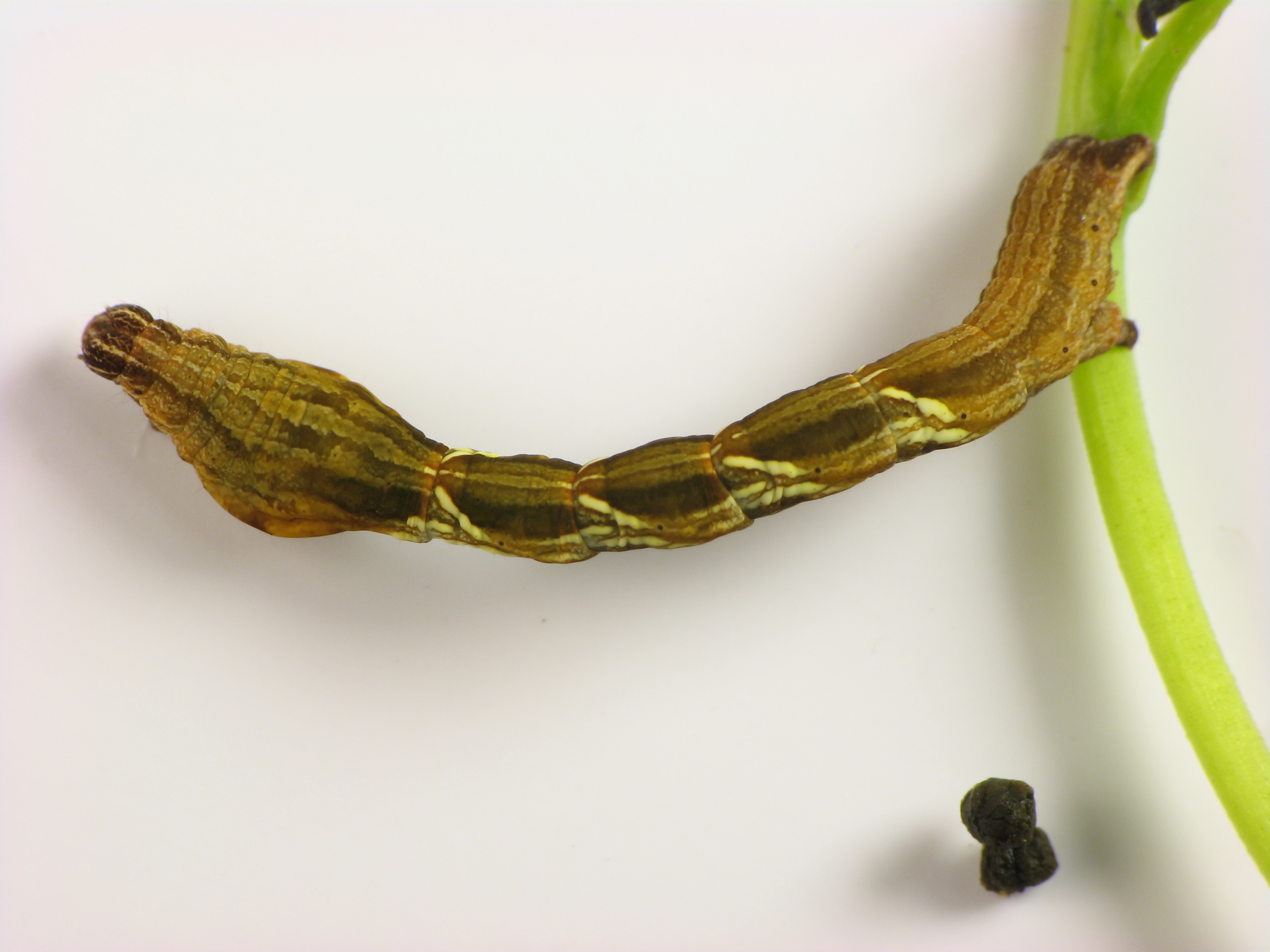
Final instar
