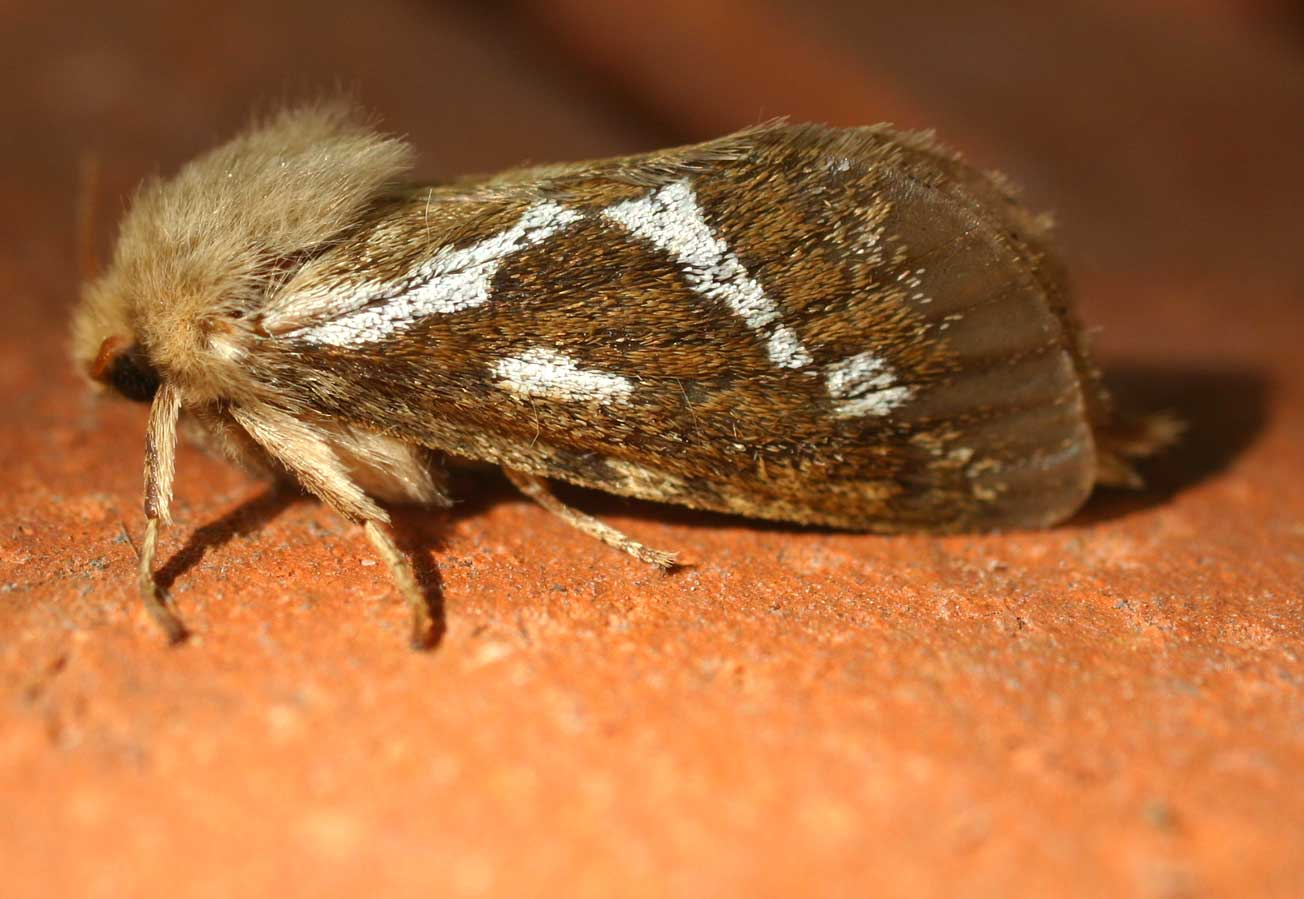
- Korscheltellus lupulina

Scientific classification
- Domain: Eukaryota
- Kingdom: Animalia
- Phylum: Arthropoda
- Class: Insecta
- Order: Lepidoptera
- Family: Hepialidae
- Genus: Korscheltellus; Börner, 1920

Species
- See text

= Korscheltellus =

Genus of moths

Korscheltellus is a genus of moths of the family Hepialidae. It consists of two widespread species, the familiar common swift (K. lupulina) of Europe and the conifer swift (K. gracilis) of Canada and the eastern United States. K. gracilis has been recorded feeding on the roots of quaking aspen, white spruce and yellow birch but is especially associated with balsam fir and red spruce. It is considered a major pest of these two species.
