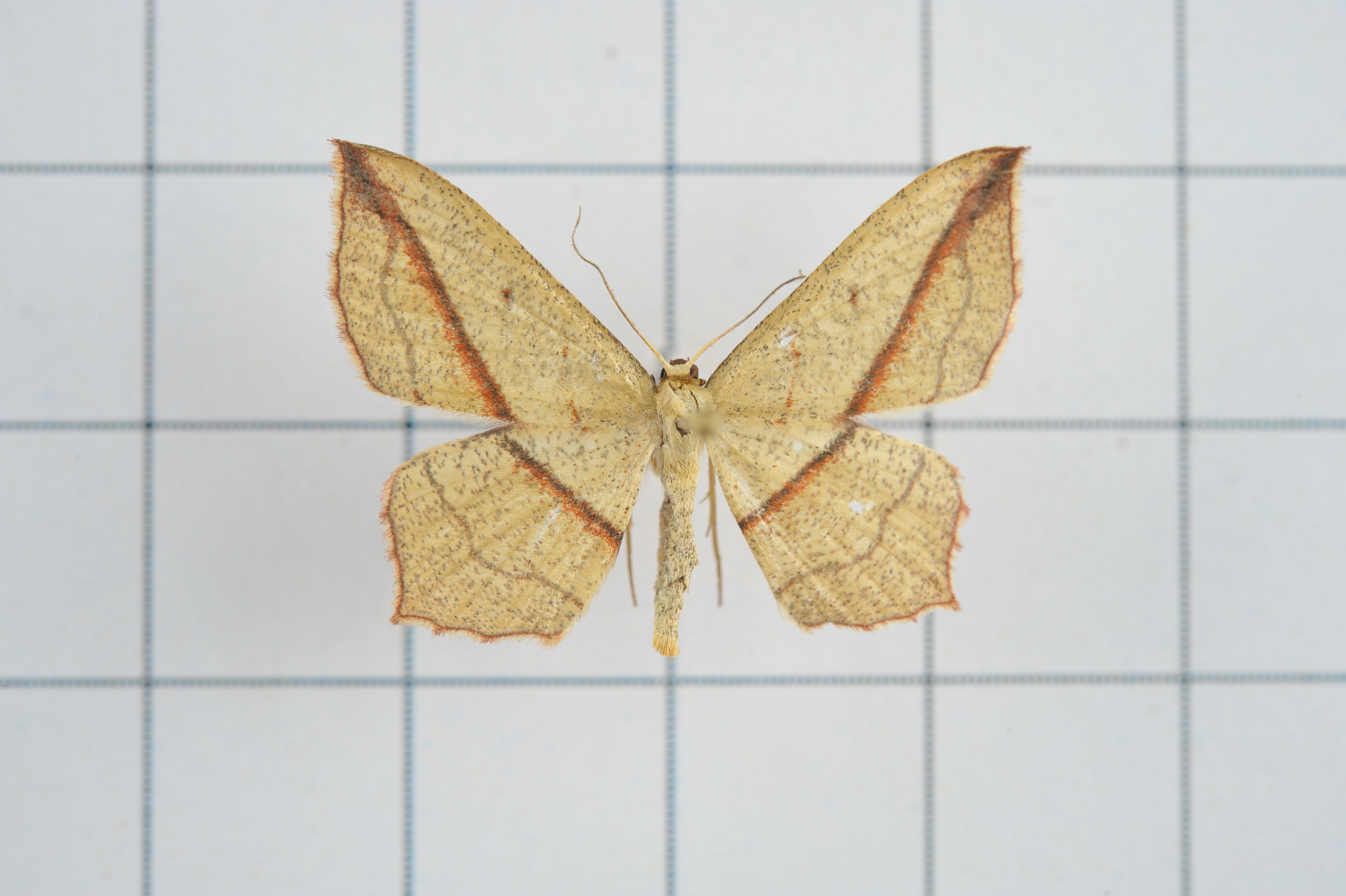

Scientific classification
- Kingdom: Animalia
- Phylum: Arthropoda
- Class: Insecta
- Order: Lepidoptera
- Family: Geometridae
- Genus: Timandra
- Species: T. comptaria

Binomial name
- Timandra comptaria Walker, 1862

= Timandra comptaria =

Species of moth

Timandra comptaria is a moth of the family Geometridae first described by Francis Walker in 1862. It is found in Sri Lanka, Japan and Taiwan.

It is a pale brownish moth with a characteristic dark brown strip which runs from the apex of the forewing to the discal margin and then runs through the middle of the hindwings. When at rest, this dark line appears as an unbroken line which runs through both forewings.
