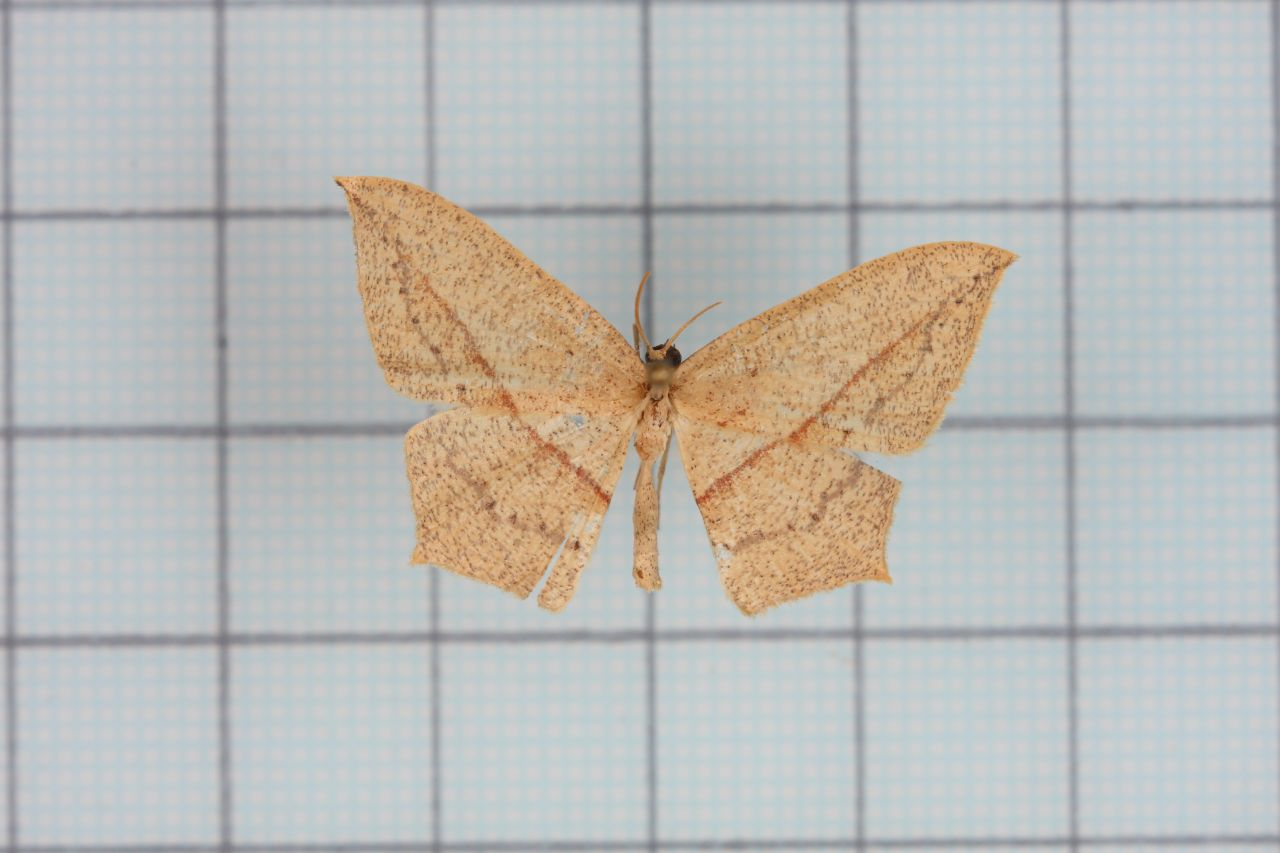

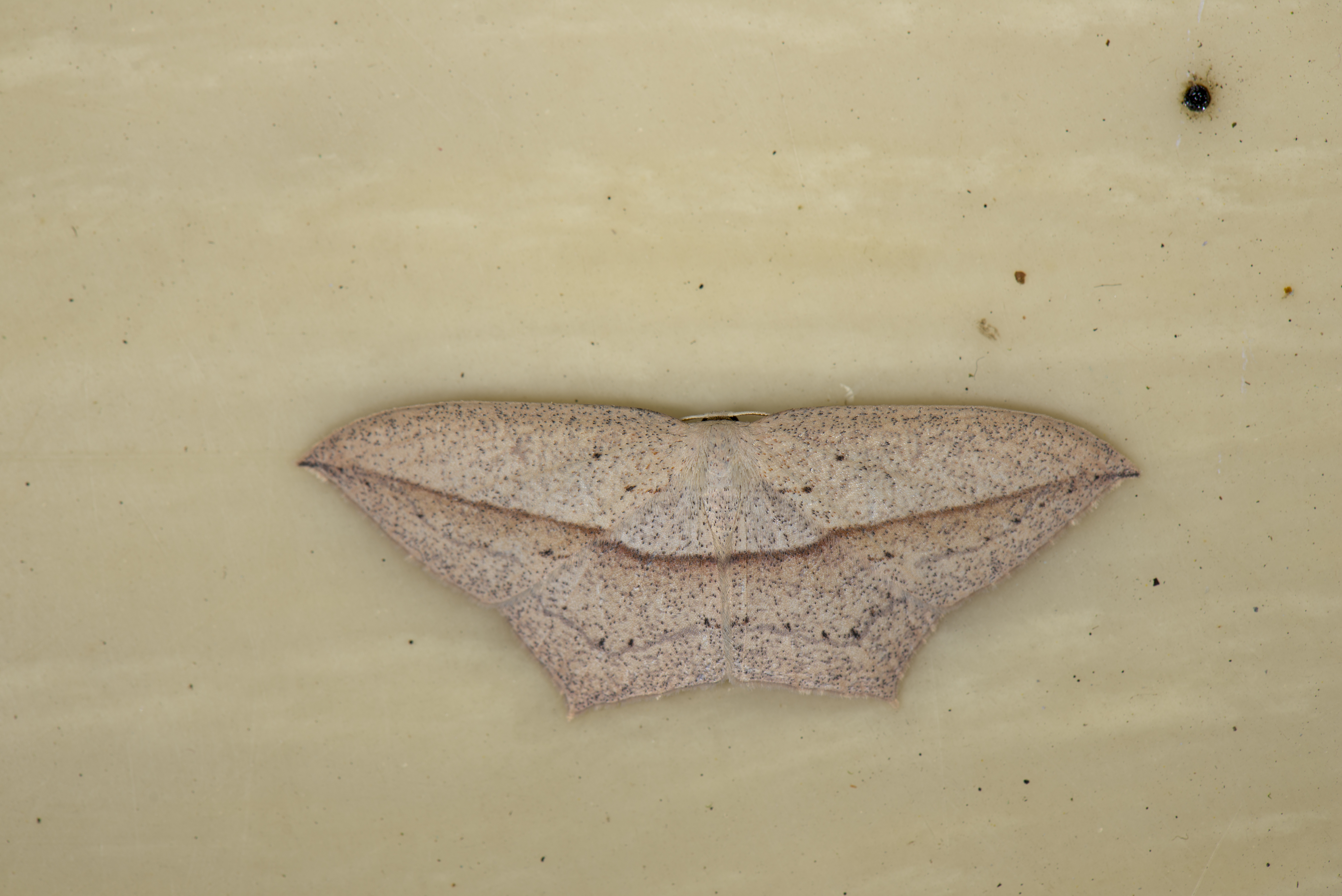

Scientific classification
- Kingdom: Animalia
- Phylum: Arthropoda
- Class: Insecta
- Order: Lepidoptera
- Family: Geometridae
- Genus: Timandra
- Species: T. extremaria

Binomial name
- Timandra extremaria Walker, 1861

Synonyms
- Timandra sordidaria Walker 1863; Calothysanis xenophyes Prout, 1935

= Timandra extremaria =

Species of moth

Timandra extremaria is a species of moth of the family Geometridae first described by Francis Walker in 1861. It is found in Taiwan.
