= Acratodes suavata =

Scientific classification
- Domain: Eukaryota
- Kingdom: Animalia
- Phylum: Arthropoda
- Class: Insecta
- Order: Lepidoptera
- Family: Geometridae
- Genus: Acratodes
- Species: A. suavata

Binomial name
- Acratodes suavata (Hulst, 1900)

Species of moth

Acratodes suavata is a species of geometrid moth in the family Geometridae. It is found in the Caribbean Sea and North America.

The MONA or Hodges number for Acratodes suavata is 7148.
