= Conifer swift =

Scientific classification
- Kingdom: Animalia
- Phylum: Arthropoda
- Clade: Pancrustacea
- Class: Insecta
- Order: Lepidoptera
- Family: Hepialidae
- Genus: Korscheltellus
- Species: K. gracilis

Binomial name
- Korscheltellus gracilis (Grote, [1865])

Species of moth

The conifer swift moth (Korscheltellus gracilis) is a swift moth considered a forest pest in eastern and central North America, from Canada south to North Carolina. Larvae feed primarily on roots of evergreen trees, and are weakly polyphagous, able to survive on deciduous trees (e.g. birches, Betula) but preferring balsam fir and red spruce. They penetrate bark, but lesions on roots are shallow. These wounds may, however, provide easy entry for pathogenic fungi and nematodes. K. gracilis has been shown to reduce survival on saplings, but adult trees have been found with more than 30 feeding scars on their roots. But trees that are weakened by air pollution or changes in soil chemistry may invite K. gracilis infestation. Adults can be found in woody areas between June and August. They are cryptically colored, but are active for 20–40 minutes each dawn and twilight, and occasionally come to light. In the conifer swift moth, courtship, mating, and egg laying occur during evening hours; only oviposition occurs in the morning. They are Exoporia, and females scatter eggs while in flight. It takes two years for the larvae to mature, so populations tend towards two-year cycles. Females emit pheromones to attract males, from organs on their hind wings.
