= St Joseph's College, Upper Norwood =

St. Joseph's College
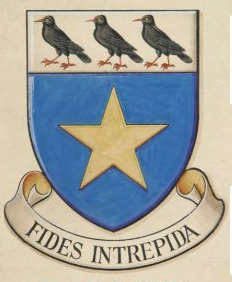

Location
- Beulah Hill; London, SE19 3HL; England; 51°25′14″N 0°06′25″W

Information
- Type: Voluntary Aided
- Motto: Fides Intrepida (Fearless Faith)
- Religious affiliation: Roman Catholic
- Established: 1855; 171 years ago
- Founder: De La Salle Brothers
- Department for Education URN: 138221 Tables
- Ofsted: Reports
- Co-Headteachers: Catherine Kane & George Mantillas
- Gender: Boys
- Age: 11 to 18
- Enrolment: 1080
- Colour: Maroon
- Publication: Beulahland
- Alumni: Old Josephians
- Website: http://www.stjosephscollege.org.uk

St Joseph's College is a 11-18 voluntary-aided, Lasallian, all boys' secondary school and sixth form with academy status, located in the Upper Norwood area of the London Borough of Croydon, England. The school is a single sex educational establishment for boys up to the age of 16 and operates a co-educational sixth-form for boys and girls aged 16 to 18.

== History ==
The college was founded in 1855 when six De La Salle brothers came from France to set up the first De La Salle school at the Redemptorist St Mary's Church Elementary school in Clapham Old Town. In 1856 the roll had expanded and the school moved to Brooklands at 49 Clapham High Street. In 1895, after just over 30 years, the school moved to The Grange in Upper Tooting. A brief stay and financial difficulty led to another move in 1897 to Dane House’in Denmark Hill. Seven years later, in 1903, the ever-transient brothers bought a property at Beulah Hill called the Grecian Villa, in which it has remained since 1904.

== Construction ==
The oldest part of the school is the Grecian Villa, which predates the school. The current Hall and Science Block were constructed in 1964, followed by a Design and Technology department in 1975, which has since been refurbished. The school features a newly built History block which includes four classrooms and an office. It has been a voluntary aided school as of 1973. In 2003, it became a Mathematics and Computing specialist school.

== Other ==
In 2011, Headmaster Eamon Connolly retired, and was succeeded by Marco Franchetti (formerly the Deputy Head and Physics teacher) who after his retirement in August 2015 was replaced in January 2016 by David Garrido. He was succeeded by Catherine Kane in September 2021, the first female headteacher in the college's 168-year history.

In 2016, a local internet company, Limetree, decided to sponsor the senior school football team at the school.

== Famous former pupils ==
- Nick Bright, radio and television presenter for BBC Radio 1Xtra and BBC Sport
- Ted Clark (b. 1937), cricketer for Middlesex C.C.C.
- Fankaty Dabo (b. 1995), footballer for Coventry City Football Club
- Francis George Kenna Gallagher (1917–2011), British Foreign Office official and diplomat
- Andrew Grima (1921–2007), British jewellery designer
- Dickie Henderson (1922–1985), British comedian, dancer and entertainer
- Myles Kenlock (b. 1996), footballer for Ipswich Town Football Club
- Martin Long (b. 1950), founder of Churchill Insurance Company, co-owner of Crystal Palace F.C.
- Roddy McDowall (1928–1998), British and American radio, stage, film, and television actor, director and photographer
- Bernard Skinner (1939-2017), author of an epoch-making book on British moths
- Peter Ventress (b. 1960), non-executive chairman of Galliford Try
- Jamael Westman (b. 1991), actor, lead role in West End production-Hamilton
- Harry Roberts (b. 1936) criminal, perpetuated the Shepards Bush murders.

== Bibliography ==
- Dillon, Terrry (2017). "Bernard Skinner: The Early Years". Atropos (58): 3–7. ISSN 1478-8128.
- Gussow, Mel (4 October 1998), "Roddy McDowall, 70, Dies; Child Star and Versatile Actor", New York Times
- Horwell, Veronica (18 January 2008). "Obituary: Andrew Grima". Theguardian.com.
