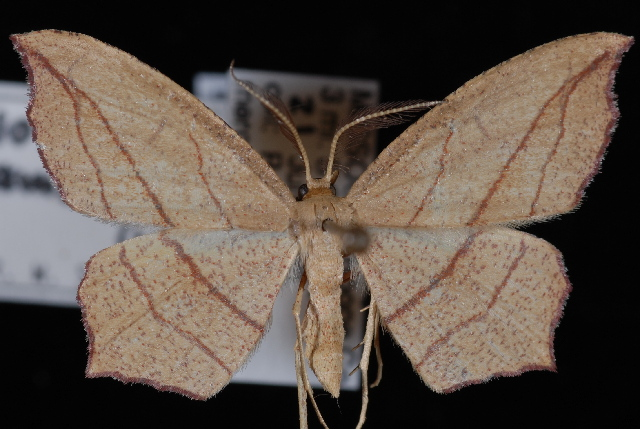

Scientific classification
- Kingdom: Animalia
- Phylum: Arthropoda
- Class: Insecta
- Order: Lepidoptera
- Family: Geometridae
- Genus: Timandra
- Species: T. amaturaria

Binomial name
- Timandra amaturaria Walker, 1866

Synonyms
- Calothysanis effusaria Prout, 1936

= Timandra amaturaria =

Species of moth

Timandra amaturaria, the cross-lined wave moth or cobra inchworm, is a species of moth of the family Geometridae. The species was first described by Francis Walker in 1866. It is found in the US from Massachusetts to Florida, west to Texas and north to Wisconsin.

The wingspan is 20–28 mm. Adults have hooked forewings. The hindwings are pointed. Adults are on wing from May to September.

The larvae feed on some species of Polygonum and Rumex.

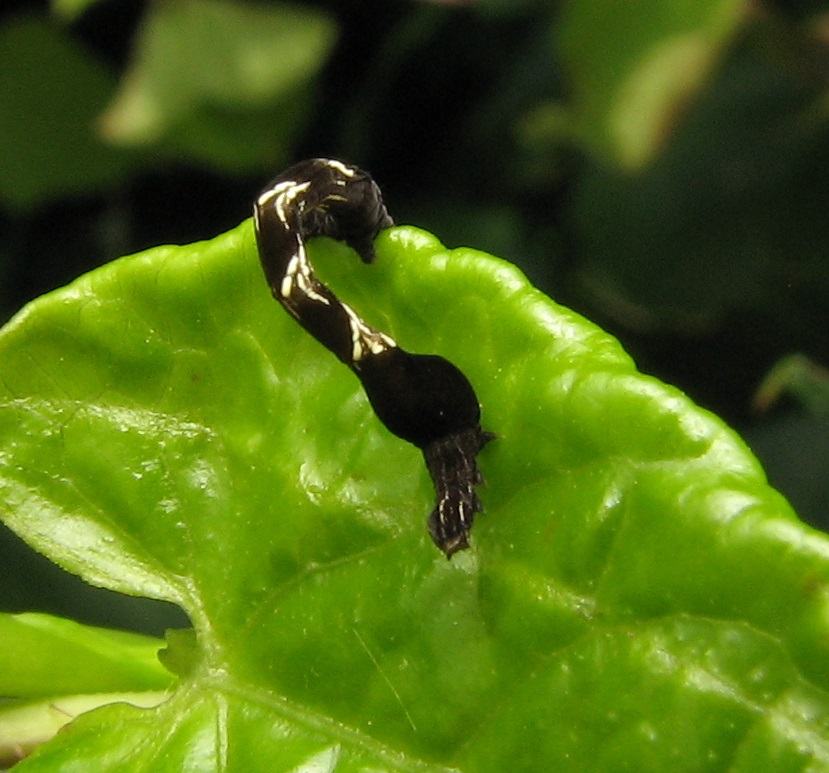
Caterpillar early instar

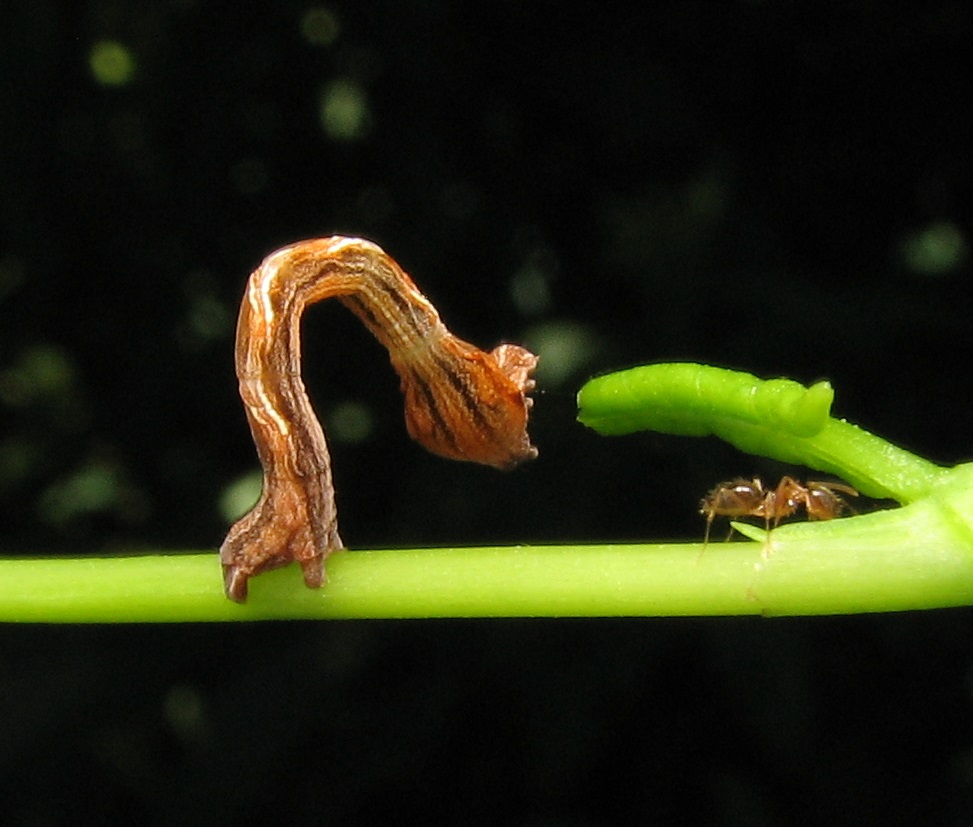
Caterpillar mid instar

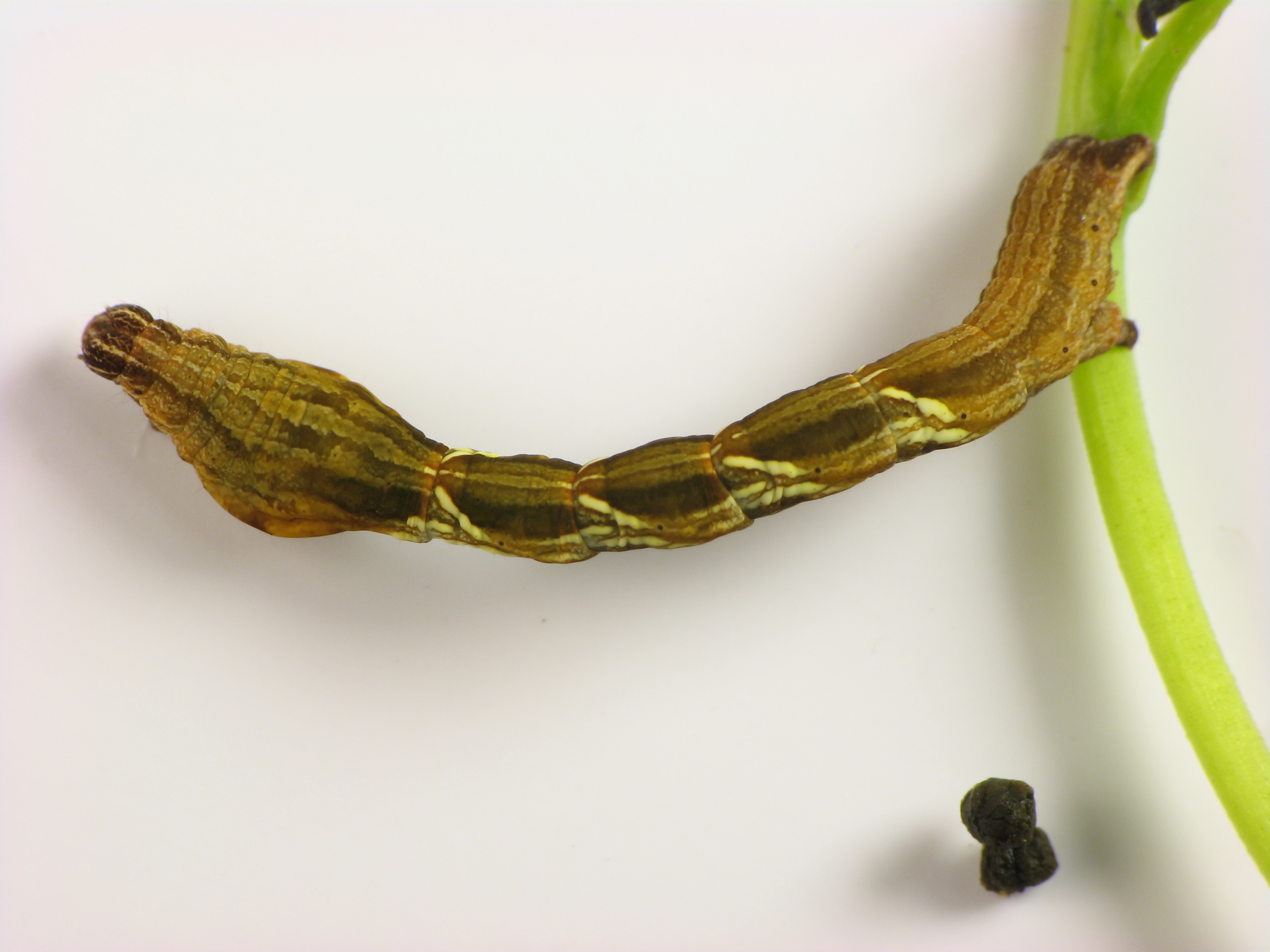
Caterpillar final instar
