= The Colour Identification Guide to Moths of the British Isles =

The Colour Identification Guide to Moths of the British Isles (second edition)

The Colour Identification Guide to Moths of the British Isles (Macrolepidoptera) by Bernard Skinner is a single volume identification guide to the macromoths of Britain and Ireland. The first edition was published in 1984, and a second, revised edition in 1998. The book became the standard guide to macromoth identification used by moth recorders in the field in Britain, and the increased popularity of moth recording in Britain in the 1990s is often attributed in large part to this book.

The first edition of the guide was illustrated by 42 colour photographic plates of pinned moth specimens, photographed by David Wilson. An extra plate by Wilson, showing additional species or aberrations was included in the second edition. For some species, additional line drawings showing specific identification features are included within the text.

A companion guide to caterpillars, The Colour Identification Guide to Caterpillars of the British Isles, by Jim Porter, was published in 2010.
