= Bernard Skinner (entomologist) =

English lepidopterist

- Born: 1939; Croydon, England
- Died: 7 February 2017 (aged 77); Croydon, London
- Education: St Joseph's College, Upper Norwood
- Known for: The Colour Identification Guide to Moths of the British Isles; The Skinner moth trap

Bernard Francis Skinner (1939 – 7 February 2017) was an English lepidopterist known for the Skinner moth trap and The Colour Identification Guide to Moths of the British Isles. The book made it easier to identify moths and the portable light trap made it easier to catch moths, thus encouraging the recording of moths as a hobby.

== Personal life ==
=== Early life ===
Bernard F Skinner was born in Croydon in the September quarter of 1939; his parents were Cecil Frank Skinner, a laundry van salesman and heavy labourer, and Ellen M. Honeybul. Following the death of his mother, when he was three years old, Bernard was brought up by two aunts in West Norwood, London. His father, who preferred to be known as Frank, lived nearby. His first school was St Joseph's College, Upper Norwood, and with a friend Terry Dillon, they visited nearby bombsites to find butterflies. Later they cycled to Streatham and Mitcham Commons and to Selsdon Bird Sanctuary. A life-long interest in moths started with the publication of R.L.E. Ford's The Observer's Book of the Larger British Moths.

== Family ==
Bernard married Jacqueline Wood (known as Jackie) at Newton Abbot in March 1967.

== Skinner trap ==
Terry Dillon and Bernard designed a wooden portable light-trap, built by a local carpenter, with Bernard dealing with the electrics. The trap later became known as the Skinner trap.

== Publications ==
The Colour Identification Guide to Moths of the British Isles revolutionised moth recording in Britain. In collaboration with David Wilson, who took the photographs for the 42 colour plates, the book provided up to date species accounts for each macro-moth found in Britain and Ireland in the last one hundred years. Before Skinner's guide was published, moth collectors had to rely on Richard South's Moths of the British Isles, which could be used for the less obvious moths only with great difficulty and expenditure of time (and preferably a reference collection).{n references needed} The layout of Skinner's book made it easier to identify moths, and was largely responsible for the increase in moth recording. It was first published in 1984, with revised editions in 1998 and 2009.
