= Michael Chinery =

- Born: 1938
- Education: University of Cambridge
- Occupation: Entomologist, naturalist, author

Michael Chinery (born 1938, in London) is an English naturalist.

He studied in Cambridge where he graduated in natural sciences and anthropology.

He edits Cecidology, the journal of the British Plant Gall Society.

== Books ==
- Animals & Plants of Britain & Europe (1991)
- Animals in the zoo,
- Animal communities,
- Britain's Plant Galls. A photographic guide (2011) WildGuides. Old Basing, Hampshire. ISBN 978 190365743 0
- The Complete Amateur Naturalist, Crescent Books, New York, 1977 ISBN 0-517-66165-9
- Forests, Kingfisher, London, 1992 ISBN 0-86272-915-7
- Purnell's concise Encyclopedia of Nature,

Chinery is well known for his books on insects :

- Insects of Britain and Northern Europe, 3rd edition, Collins field guide. ISBN 0-00-219918-1
- Insects of Britain and Western Europe, Collins Guide, 1986 (reprinted in 1991)
- Butterflies of Britain and Europe, Collins Wildlife Trust Guides.
