= Cyllopodini =

Scientific classification
- Kingdom: Animalia
- Phylum: Arthropoda
- Clade: Pancrustacea
- Class: Insecta
- Order: Lepidoptera
- Family: Geometridae
- Subfamily: Sterrhinae
- Tribe: Cyllopodini; Kirby, 1892

Genera
- See text

Synonyms
- Micropinini White, 1876

Tribe of moths

Cyllopodini is a tribe of the geometer moth family (Geometridae), with about 68 species in 7 genera and 2 genera with 7 species tentatively associated with the tribe.

== Genera ==
- Atyria Hubner, 1823
- Atyriodes Warren, 1895
- Cyllopoda Dalman, 1823
- Formiana Druce, 1885
- Paratyria Warren, 1895
- Smicropus Warren, 1895
- Xanthyris Felder & Felder, 1862

== Uncertain association ==
- Myrice Walker, 1854
- Oncopus Herrich-Schaffer, 1855
