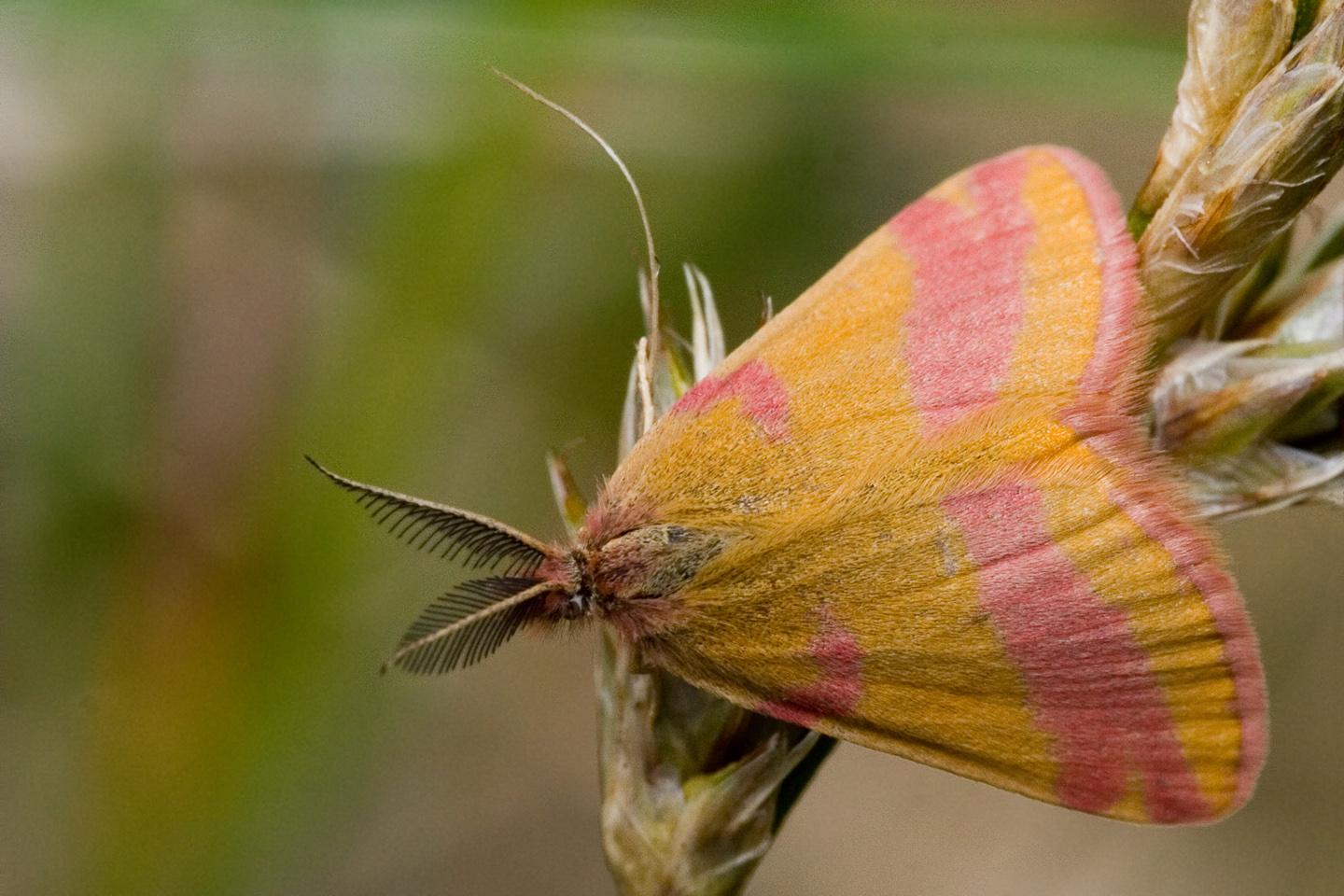
- Lythria cruentaria

Scientific classification
- Kingdom: Animalia
- Phylum: Arthropoda
- Clade: Pancrustacea
- Class: Insecta
- Order: Lepidoptera
- Family: Geometridae
- Subfamily: Sterrhinae
- Tribe: Lythriini; Herbulot, 1962
- Genus: Lythria; Hübner, 1823

= Lythria =

Genus of moths

Lythria is a genus of moths in the family Geometridae erected by Jacob Hübner in 1823. It is the only genus of the monotypic tribe Lythriini described by Claude Herbulot in 1962.

== Systematics ==
The genus Lythria consists of five species:

- Tribe Lythriini Herbulot, 1962
  - Genus Lythria Hübner, 1823
    - Lythria cruentaria (Hufnagel, 1767)
    - Lythria plumularia (Freyer, 1831)
    - Lythria purpuraria (Linnaeus, 1758)
    - Lythria sanguinaria (Duponchel, 1842)
    - Lythria venustata Staudinger, 1882

== Phylogenics ==
Within the Sterrhinae, the Lythriini are probably the sister group of the Rhodometrini, as diagrammed by the cladogram below:

- Sterrhinae
  - - Cosymbiini
    - - - Rhodometrini
        - Lythriini
      - Timandrini
  - - - Rhodostrophiini
      - - unsure
        - - Cyllopodini
          - - unsure
            - - Sterrhini
              - Scopulini
