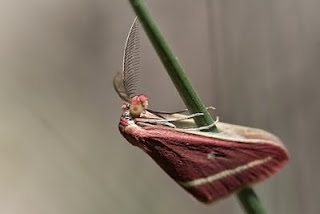

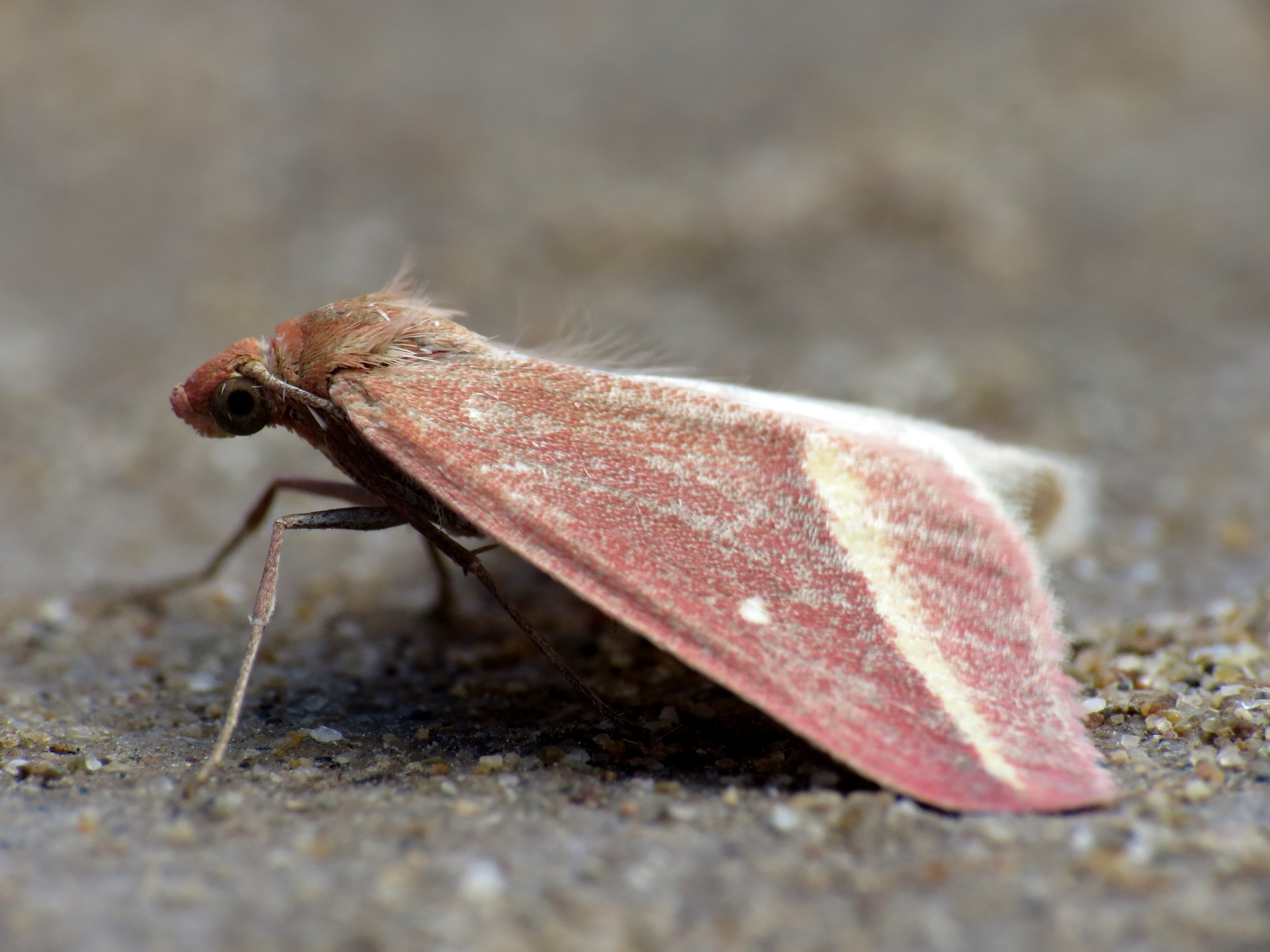

Scientific classification
- Kingdom: Animalia
- Phylum: Arthropoda
- Clade: Pancrustacea
- Class: Insecta
- Order: Lepidoptera
- Family: Geometridae
- Genus: Casilda
- Species: C. consecraria

Binomial name
- Casilda consecraria (Staudinger, 1871)

Synonyms
- Sterrha consecraria Rambur, 1858; Casilda consecraria albidaria (Erschoff, 1874)

= Casilda consecraria =

Species of moth

Casilda consecraria is a species of moth in the family Geometridae. It is a Southwest Palaearctic species associated with halophytic habitats, ranging from the Ibearian Peninsula and North Africa (Western Sahara) east to west-central Asia (Kazakhstan, Turkmenistan, Uzbekistan).

The host plants are Limonium spp. (Limonium dichotomum, Limonium sinuatum).
