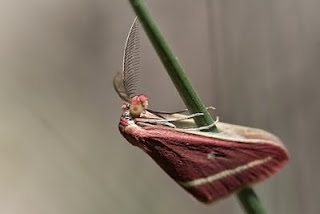
- Casilda consecraria

Scientific classification
- Domain: Eukaryota
- Kingdom: Animalia
- Phylum: Arthropoda
- Class: Insecta
- Order: Lepidoptera
- Family: Geometridae
- Tribe: Rhodometrini
- Genus: Casilda; Agenjo, 1952

= Casilda (moth) =

Genus of moths

Casilda is a genus of moths in the family Geometridae erected by Ramón Agenjo Cecilia in 1952.

== Species ==
- Casilda antophilaria (Hübner, 1813)
- Casilda consecraria (Staudinger, 1871)
- Casilda rosearia (Treitschke, 1828)
