= Chorizomena =

Scientific classification
- Kingdom: Animalia
- Phylum: Arthropoda
- Class: Insecta
- Order: Lepidoptera
- Family: Geometridae
- Subfamily: Sterrhinae
- Genus: Chorizomena; Turner, 1939
- Species: C. nivosa

Binomial name
- Chorizomena nivosa Turner, 1939

Genus of geometer moths (Geometridae) in subfamily Sterrhinae

Chorizomena is a monotypic moth genus in the family Geometridae. Its only species, Chorizomena nivosa, is found in Australia. Both the genus and species were first described by Turner in 1939.
