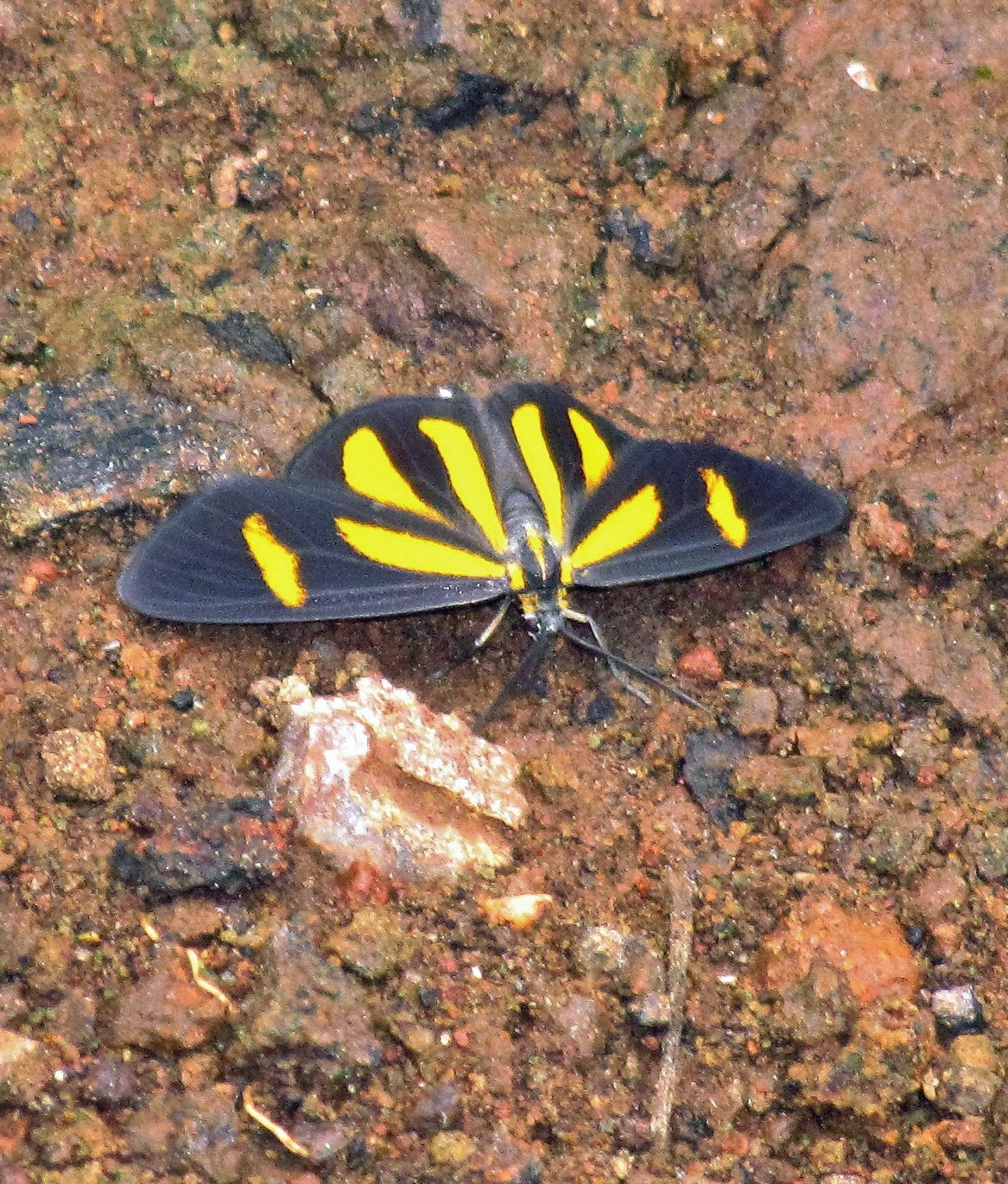
- Cyllopoda claudicula, Argentina

Scientific classification
- Kingdom: Animalia
- Phylum: Arthropoda
- Class: Insecta
- Order: Lepidoptera
- Family: Geometridae
- Subfamily: Sterrhinae
- Genus: Cyllopoda; Dalman, 1823

Synonyms
- Flavinia Walker, 1854

= Cyllopoda =

Genus of moths

Cyllopoda is a genus of moths in the family Geometridae.

== Description ==
Species of this genus have an aposematic color pattern. They are involved in an extensive mimicry complex with other moths of the tribe Cyllopodini and other Geometridae. These day-flying moths are usually very bright with black bands on a yellow or white background.

== Distribution ==
This genus is present in the Neotropical realm, mainly in South America with a few species in Central America and Trinidad and Tobago.

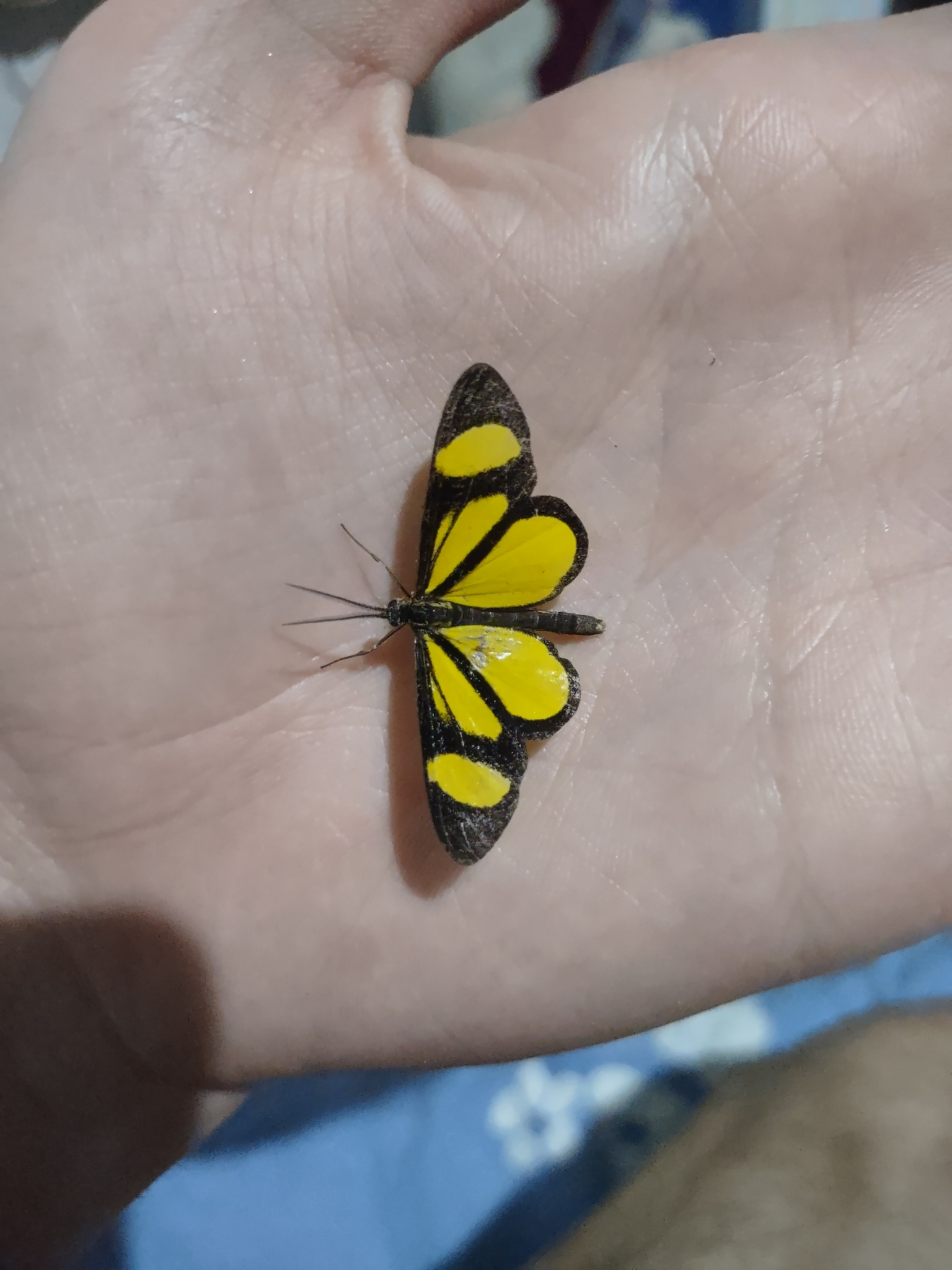
Cyllopoda nigrivena, Brasil

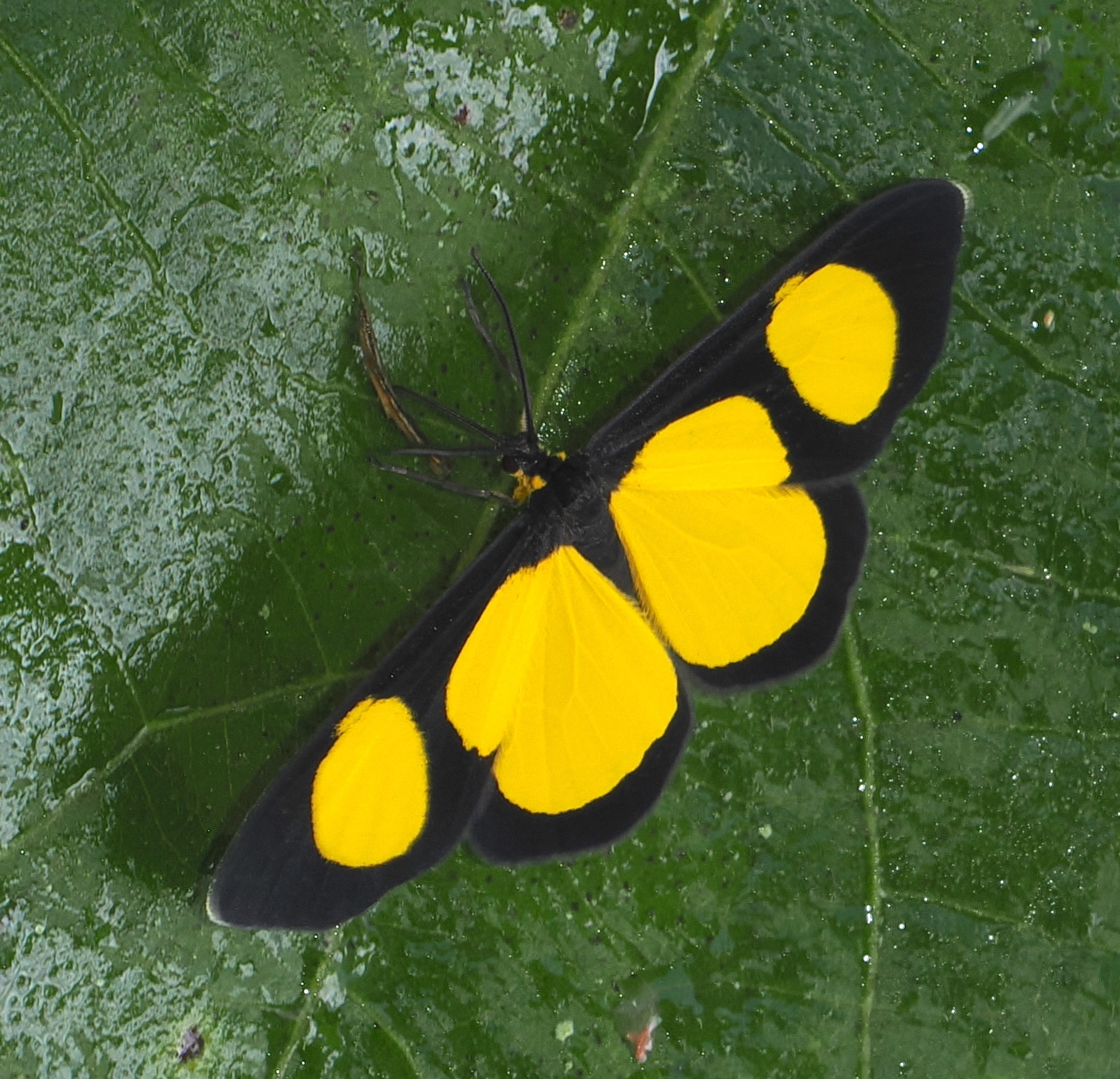
Cyllopoda jatropharia, Colombia

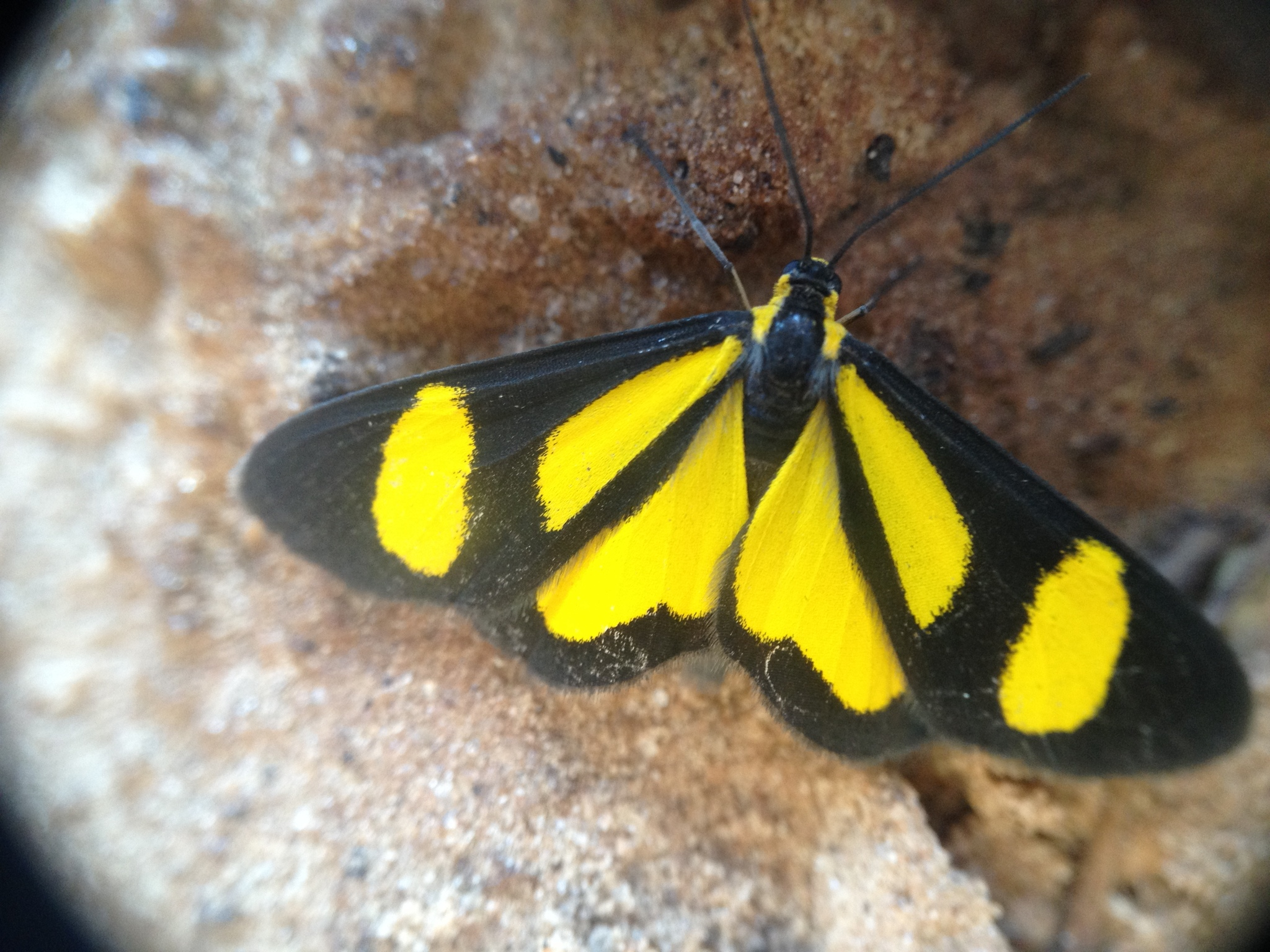
Cyllopoda bipuncta, Paraguay

== Species ==
These 14 species belong to the genus Cyllopoda:

- Cyllopoda angusta Warren, 1897
- Cyllopoda angustistriga Warren, 1904
- Cyllopoda bipuncta Warren, 1906
- Cyllopoda breviplaga (Dognin, 1906)
- Cyllopoda claudicula (Dalman, 1823)
- Cyllopoda expansifascia Prout, 1917
- Cyllopoda gibbifrons Prout, 1917
- Cyllopoda jatropharia (Linnaeus, 1758)
- Cyllopoda latiflava Warren, 1905
- Cyllopoda nigrivena Prout, 1917
- Cyllopoda osiris Cramer, 1777
- Cyllopoda postica (Walker, 1854)
- Cyllopoda radiata Warren, 1906
- Cyllopoda roxana (Druce, 1885)
