= Crypsityla =

Scientific classification
- Kingdom: Animalia
- Phylum: Arthropoda
- Class: Insecta
- Order: Lepidoptera
- Family: Geometridae
- Subfamily: Sterrhinae
- Genus: Crypsityla; Warren, 1900

Genus of geometer moths (Geometridae) in subfamily Sterrhinae

Crypsityla is a genus of moths in the family Geometridae erected by William Warren in 1900.
