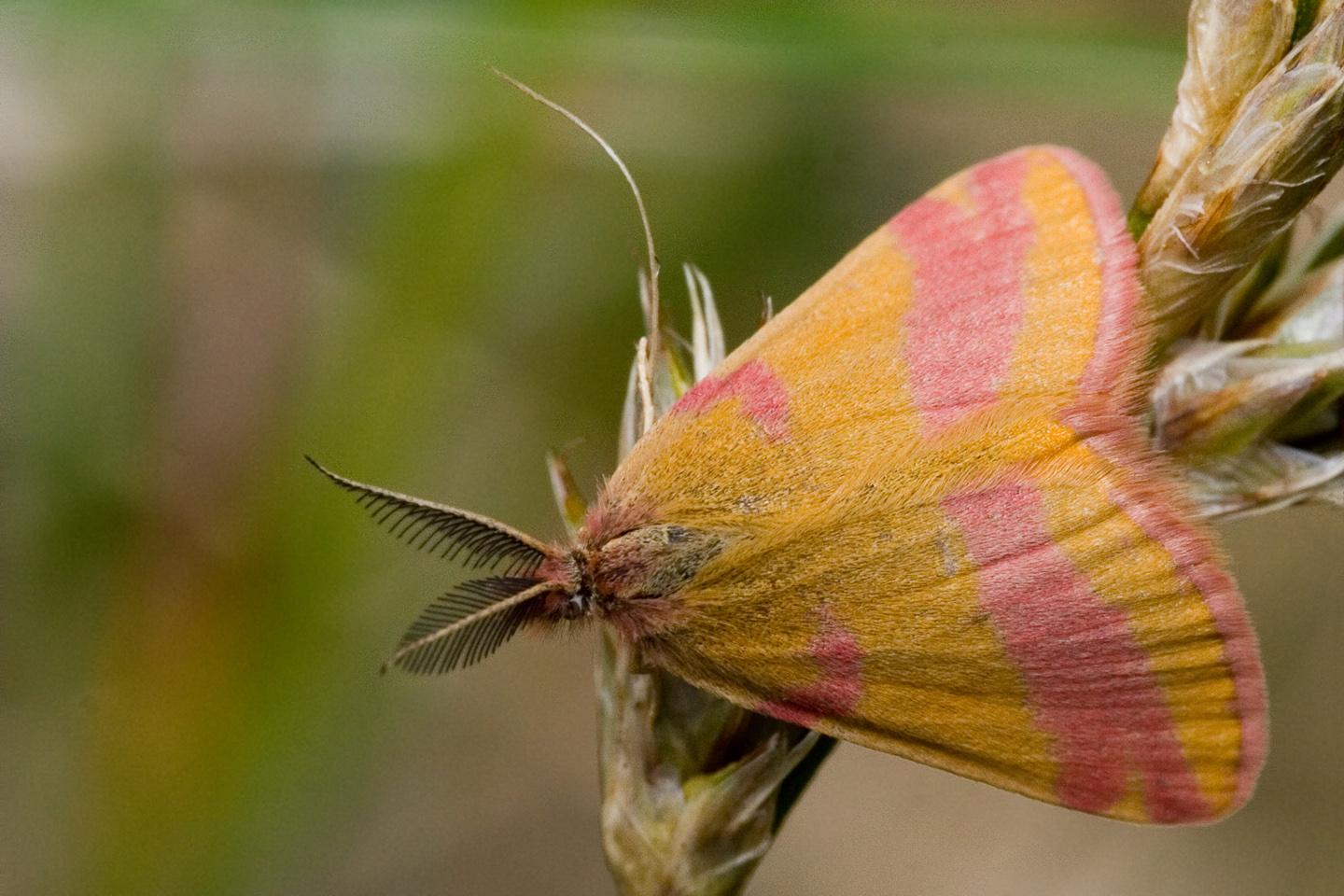

Scientific classification
- Kingdom: Animalia
- Phylum: Arthropoda
- Clade: Pancrustacea
- Class: Insecta
- Order: Lepidoptera
- Family: Geometridae
- Genus: Lythria
- Species: L. cruentaria

Binomial name
- Lythria cruentaria (Hufnagel, 1767)

Synonyms
- Lythria rotaria

= Lythria cruentaria =

Species of moth

Lythria cruentaria is a moth of the family Geometridae. The species can be found in Europe.

The length of the forewings is 9–13 mm. The moths fly in two or three generations from the end of April to the end of September..

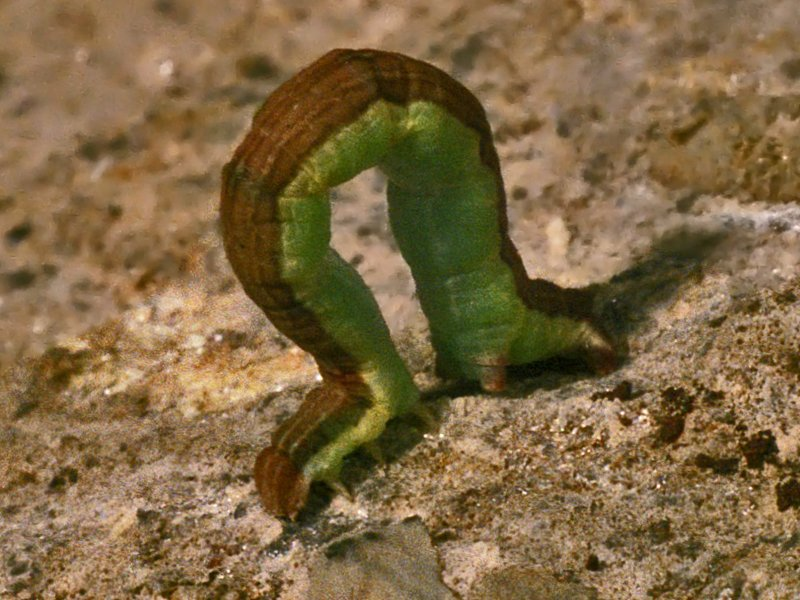
Caterpillar

The caterpillars feed on sorrel and sheep's sorrel.

== Notes ==
1. The flight season refers to the Belgium and the Netherlands. This may vary in other parts of the range.
