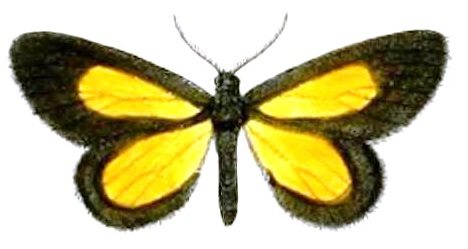

Scientific classification
- Kingdom: Animalia
- Phylum: Arthropoda
- Class: Insecta
- Order: Lepidoptera
- Family: Geometridae
- Genus: Atyria
- Species: A. lemonia

Binomial name
- Atyria lemonia (H. Druce, 1890)

Synonyms
- Flavinia lemonia H. Druce, 1890; Cyllopoda obtusimacula Warren, 1897

= Atyria lemonia =

Species of moth

Atyria lemonia is a species of moth of the family Geometridae first described by Herbert Druce in 1890. It is found in Ecuador.
