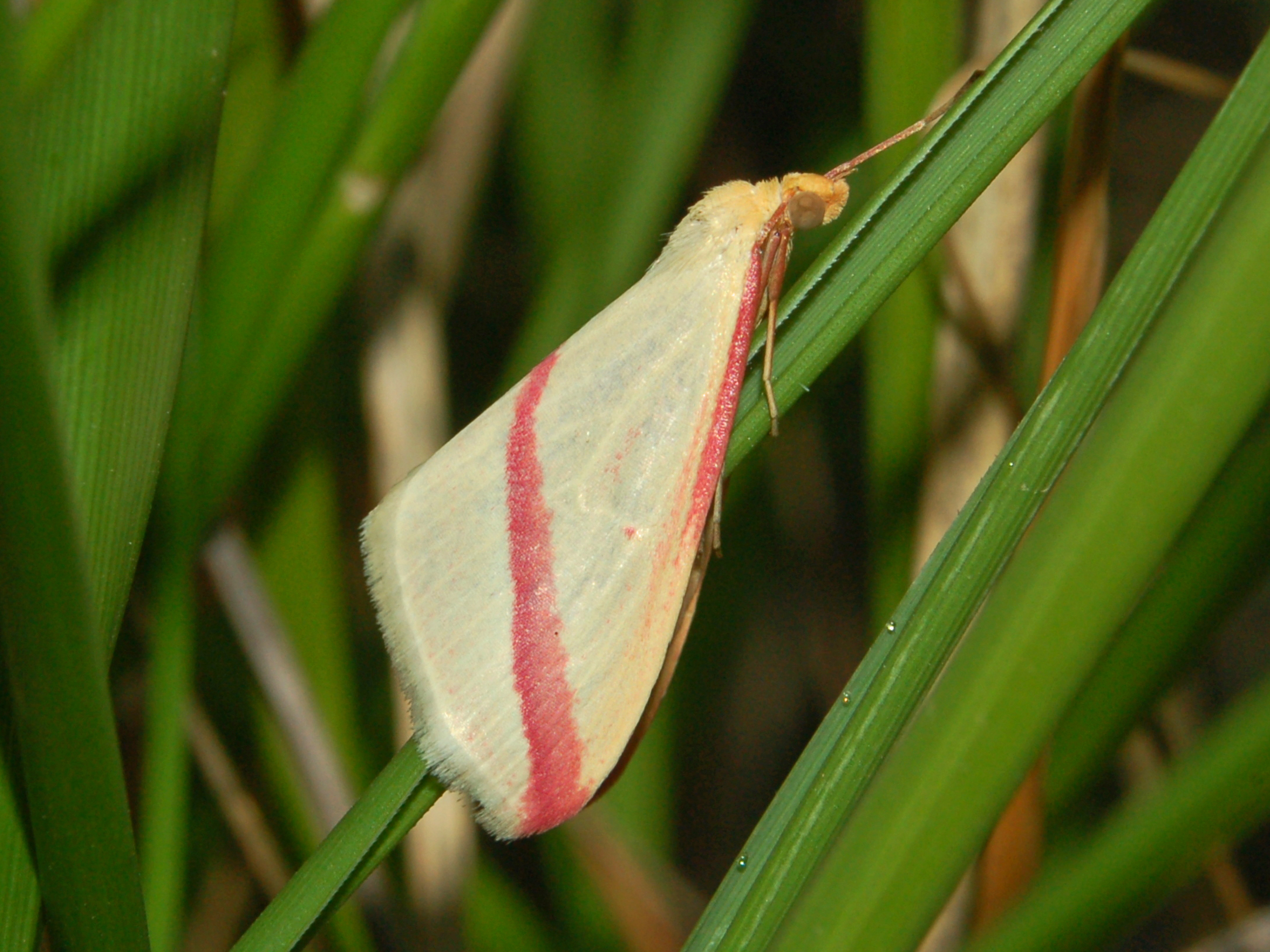
- Lateral view
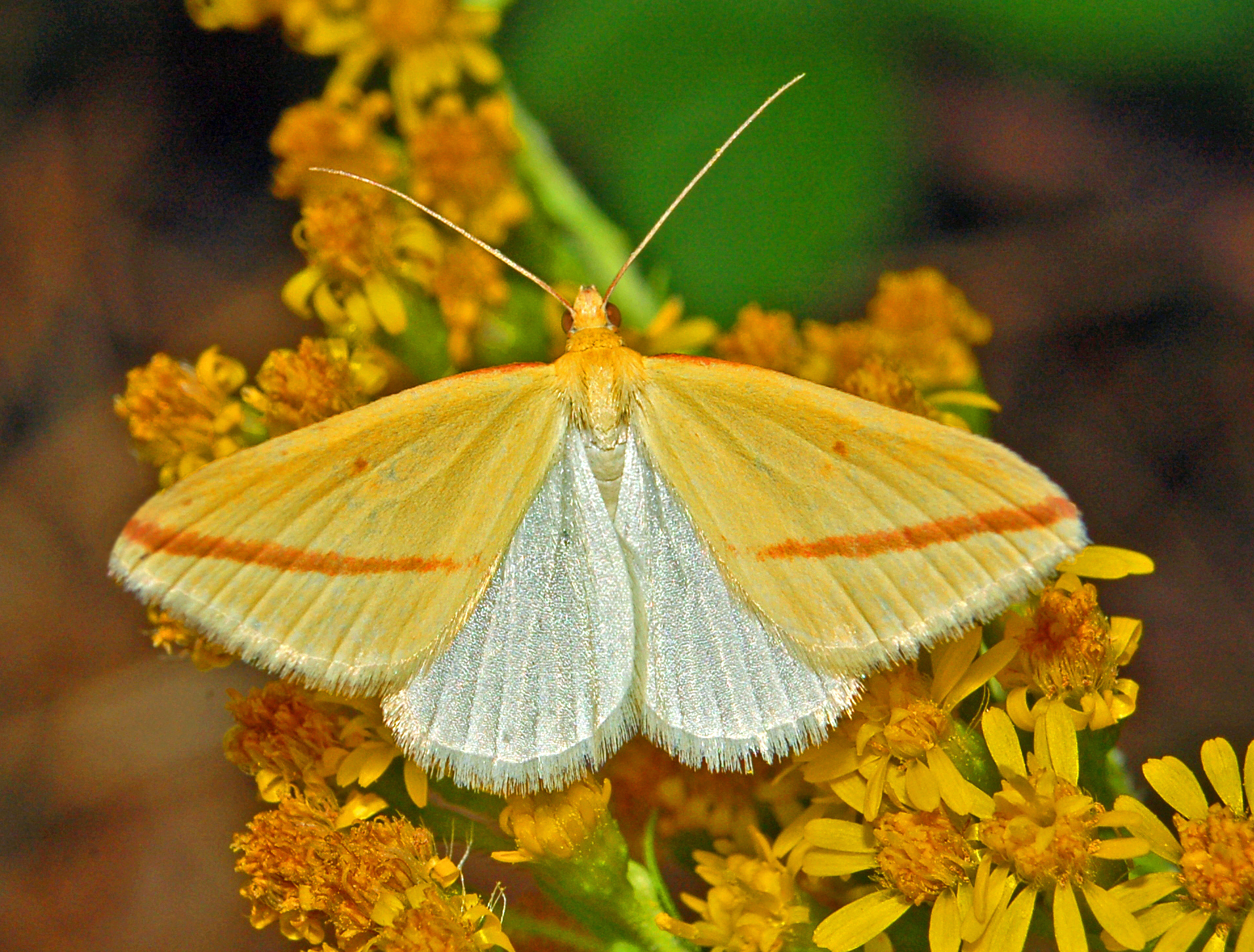
- Dorsal view of a female

Scientific classification
- Kingdom: Animalia
- Phylum: Arthropoda
- Clade: Pancrustacea
- Class: Insecta
- Order: Lepidoptera
- Family: Geometridae
- Genus: Rhodometra
- Species: R. sacraria

Binomial name
- Rhodometra sacraria (Linnaeus, 1767)

Synonyms
- List: Rhodometra fulvaria (Fabricius, 1794); Rhodometra labda (Cramer, 1777); Rhodometra minervae (Gistl, 1856); Rhodometra sacralis (Thunberg, 1784); Rhodometra sanguinaria (Esper, 1801)

= Rhodometra sacraria =

Species of moth

Rhodometra sacraria, the vestal, is a moth of the family Geometridae. The species was first described by Carl Linnaeus in his 1767 12th edition of Systema Naturae.

== Distribution ==
It can be found throughout Europe, in the Near East, in North Africa, in the Afrotropical realm and in large parts of Asia. It is also found in South America (Chile and Argentina).

== Habitat ==
Rhodometra sacraria inhabits meadows, forest clearing, paths, gardens and urban environments.

== Description ==
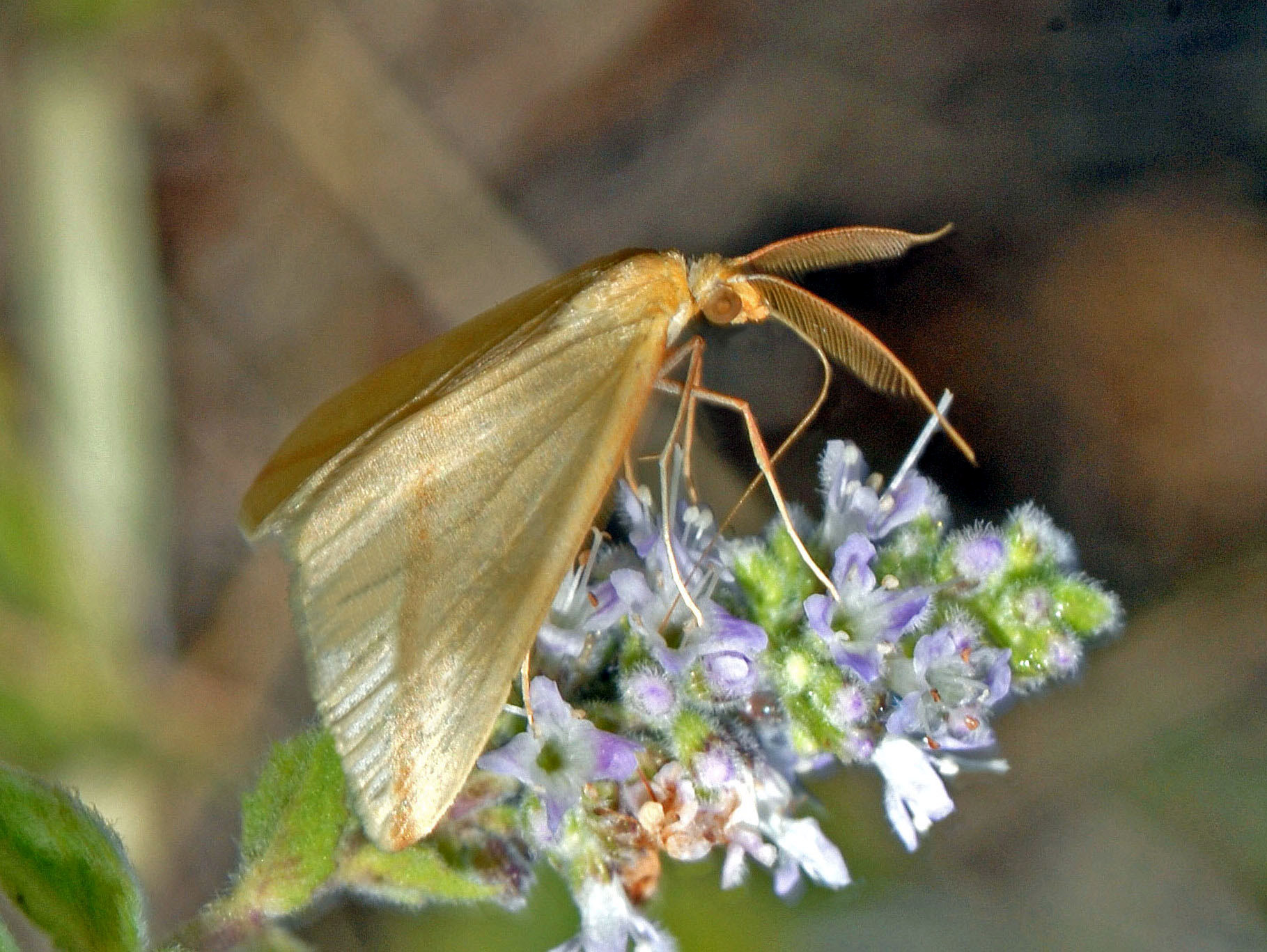
Male showing bipectinated antennae

A specimen with more intense pink pigmentation

Rhodometra sacraria has a wingspan reaching 22–28 mm, while the length of the forewings is 12–14 mm. The late generations are smaller and the wingspan has an average of 16–26 mm. These moths are easily distinguishable from the mahogany or pink stripe, located on yellowish or cream background, crossing diagonally the dorsal sides of the upperwings from the posterior margin up to the apex. Discal spots are usually present and have the same colour as the postmedial line.

The dorsal sides of the hindwings are whitish and unmarked. The fringes on the wings are mostly in the basic colour. The abdomen is pure white. Head and thorax are straw yellow. In males the antennae are bipectinated to three-fourths length. The hind tibiae bear two pairs of spurs.

The intensity and the extent of the pink pigmentation is rather variable, depending on the seasonal temperature in the development of the pupae.

== Biology ==
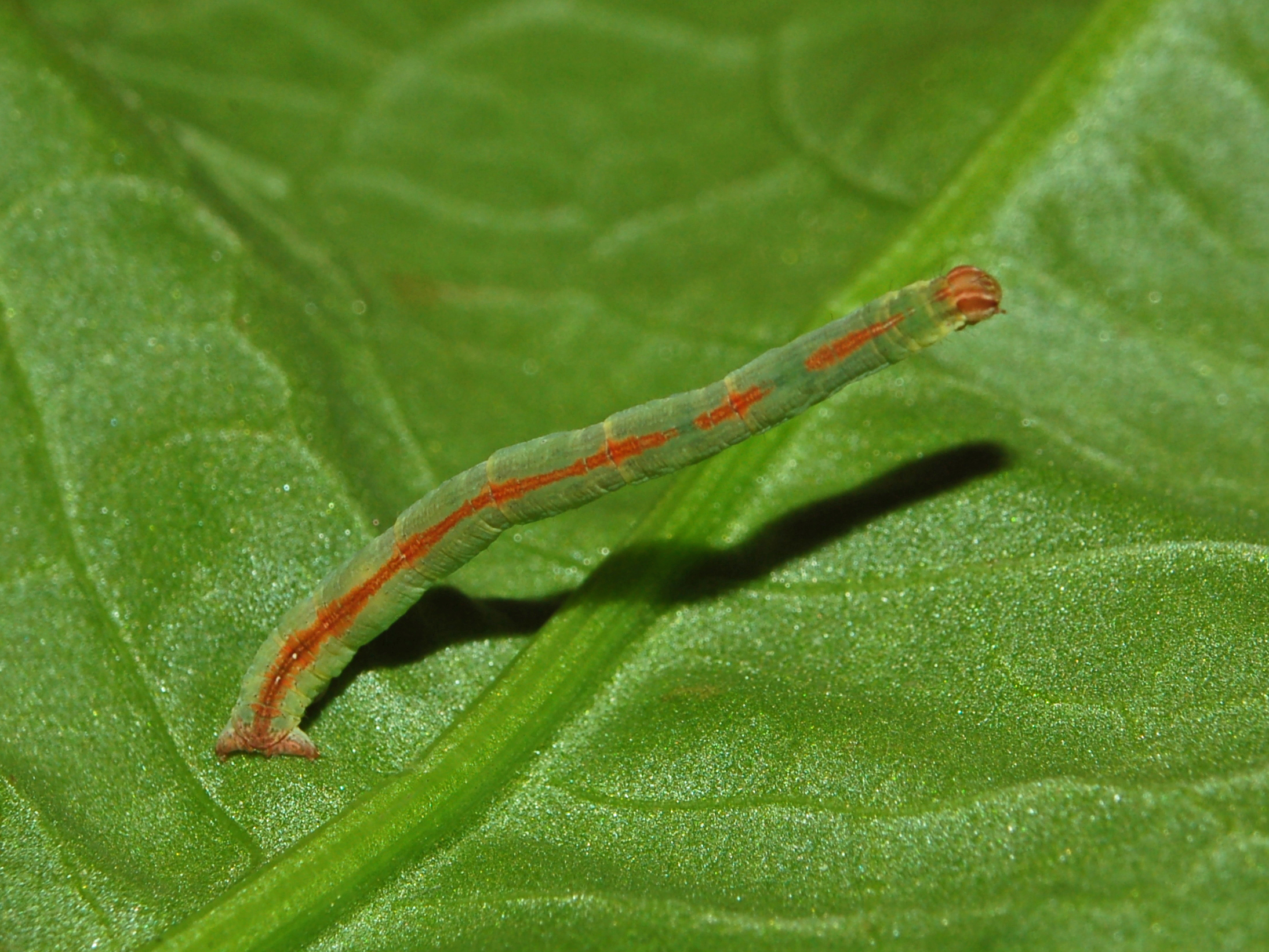
Caterpillar on a leaf of Rumex crispus

Usually these moths rest with a tent-like posture on twigs and herbs, with the wings parallel to each other. They fly from April to October in the Northern Hemisphere. They are nocturnal, attracted to light and migrant. These moths breed in North Africa and in southern Europe, since they require constant warmth. The eggs are relatively long, yellowish, with distinct red spots.

The caterpillars mimic twigs and therefore they are quite difficult to locate. They are slender and reach a length of about 25 millimetres. The basic colour is pale brown or green, with a whitish underside. The green forms usually show a dark brown or reddish irregular stripe on the back. The head is reddish brown and relatively small.

These caterpillars feed on knotgrass, dock, Anthemis, Emex, Oxygonum, Persicaria, Rhus and other low growing plants. The pupa can reach a length of 9.2 mm and a diameter of about 2.7 mm. It is yellowish brown coloured, with dark spots.

== Notes ==
1. The flight season refers to the Belgium and the Netherlands. This may vary in other parts of the range.
