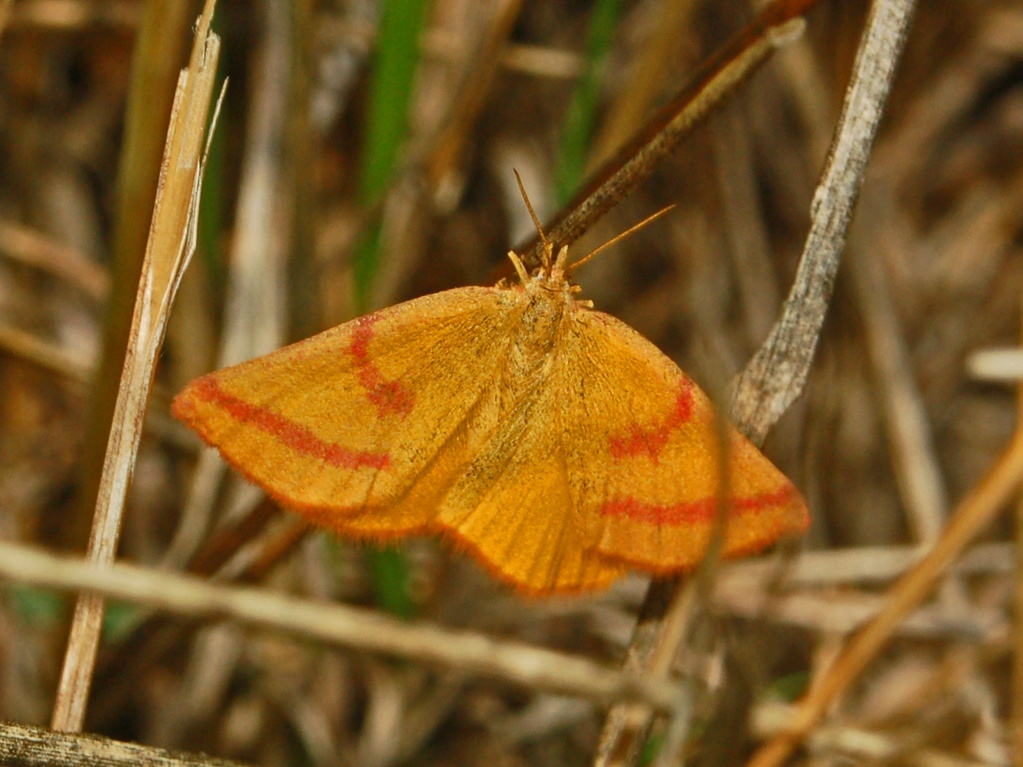

Scientific classification
- Kingdom: Animalia
- Phylum: Arthropoda
- Clade: Pancrustacea
- Class: Insecta
- Order: Lepidoptera
- Family: Geometridae
- Genus: Lythria
- Species: L. purpuraria

Binomial name
- Lythria purpuraria (Linnaeus, 1758)

= Lythria purpuraria =

Species of moth

Lythria purpuraria, the purple-barred yellow, is a species of moth of the family Geometridae. It is found from western Europe to Siberia, Russia, Ukraine, Turkmenistan and Kazakhstan.

Lythria purpuraria generally have two red-purple transverse lines in their green-yellow forewings. They are often confused with L. cruentaria, a sister species in the same family. This is because they are both available in a variety of sizes with multiple wing patterns. L. purpuraria and the other four species within the Lythria family have a very difficult genitalia structure, which is complicated to analyze and study.

Adults are on wing from April to June and again from July to September. It is a day-flying species. There are two generations per year.

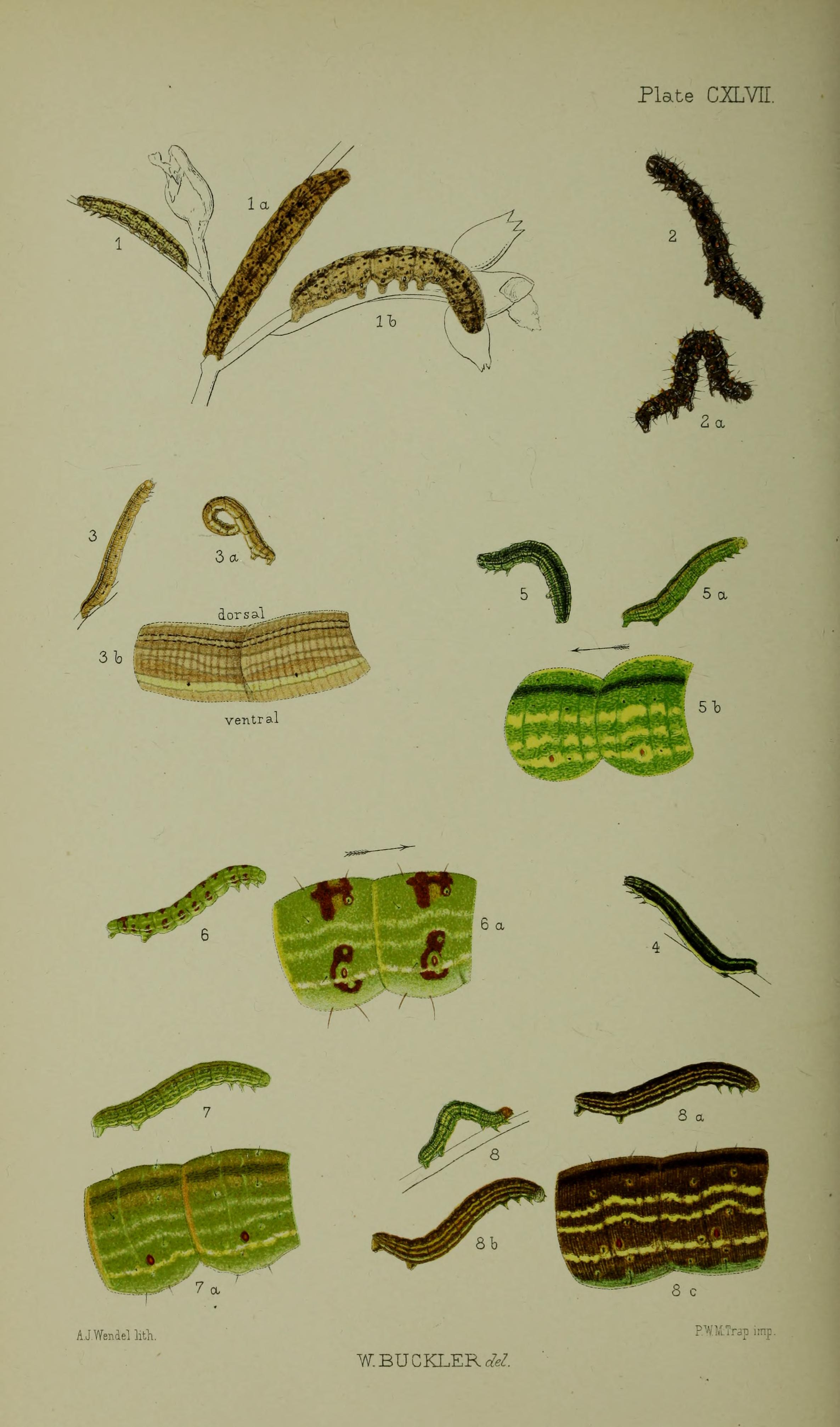
Figs.4 larvae after final moult

The larvae feed on prostrate knotweed, also known as Polygonum aviculare.
