= Oncopus =

Scientific classification
- Kingdom: Animalia
- Phylum: Arthropoda
- Class: Insecta
- Order: Lepidoptera
- Family: Geometridae
- Subfamily: Sterrhinae
- Genus: Oncopus; Herrich-Schäffer, 1855

Genus of moths

Oncopus is a genus of moths in the family Geometridae first described by Gottlieb August Wilhelm Herrich-Schäffer in 1855. It is a senior homonym of Oncopus Thorell, 1876, but since this latter genus of opilionids has been much more used in the literature, it has been proposed to the ICZN in 2006 to suppress the Lepidoptera name. The proposal was refused in 2008.
