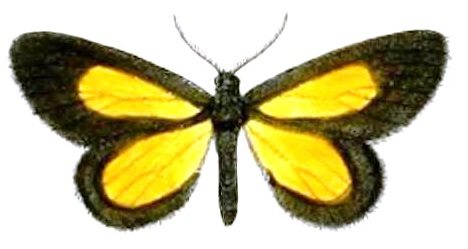
- Atyria lemonia

Scientific classification
- Kingdom: Animalia
- Phylum: Arthropoda
- Clade: Pancrustacea
- Class: Insecta
- Order: Lepidoptera
- Family: Geometridae
- Tribe: Cyllopodini
- Genus: Atyria; Hübner, 1823

= Atyria =

Genus of moths

Atyria is a genus of moths in the family Geometridae.

== Species ==
- Atyria albifrons Prout, 1916
- Atyria alcidamea (Druce, 1890)
- Atyria allogaster (Prout, 1918)
- Atyria basina (Boisduval, 1870)
- Atyria centralis (Dognin, 1911)
- Atyria chibcha (Schaus, 1892)
- Atyria circumdata (Maassen, 1890)
- Atyria commoda Prout, 1938
- Atyria compensata (Dognin, 1906)
- Atyria dichroa (Perty, 1833)
- Atyria dichroides Prout, 1916
- Atyria dubia (Schaus, 1892)
- Atyria durnfordi (Druce, 1899)
- Atyria fumosa Kohler, 1924
- Atyria gracillima (Warren, 1907)
- Atyria isis Hübner, 1823
- Atyria lemonia (Druce, 1890)
- Atyria limbata (Butler, 1873)
- Atyria matutina (Walker, 1865)
- Atyria mnemosyne Prout, 1916
- Atyria nanipennis (Warren, 1900)
- Atyria portis Prout, 1938
- Atyria quadriradiata (Weymer, 1901)
- Atyria quicha (Schaus, 1892)
- Atyria sciaulax Prout, 1938
- Atyria stenochora (Prout, 1918)
- Atyria subdichroa Dognin, 1900
- Atyria triradiata Prout, 1938
- Atyria velata (Druce, 1885)
- Atyria vespertina (Walker, [1865])
- Atyria volumnia (Druce, 1899)
