= Myrice =

Scientific classification
- Kingdom: Animalia
- Phylum: Arthropoda
- Class: Insecta
- Order: Lepidoptera
- Family: Geometridae
- Subfamily: Sterrhinae
- Genus: Myrice

Synonyms
- Asiona Walker, 1854; Hemigymnodes Warren, 1894

Genus of moths

Myrice is a genus of moths in the family Geometridae.
