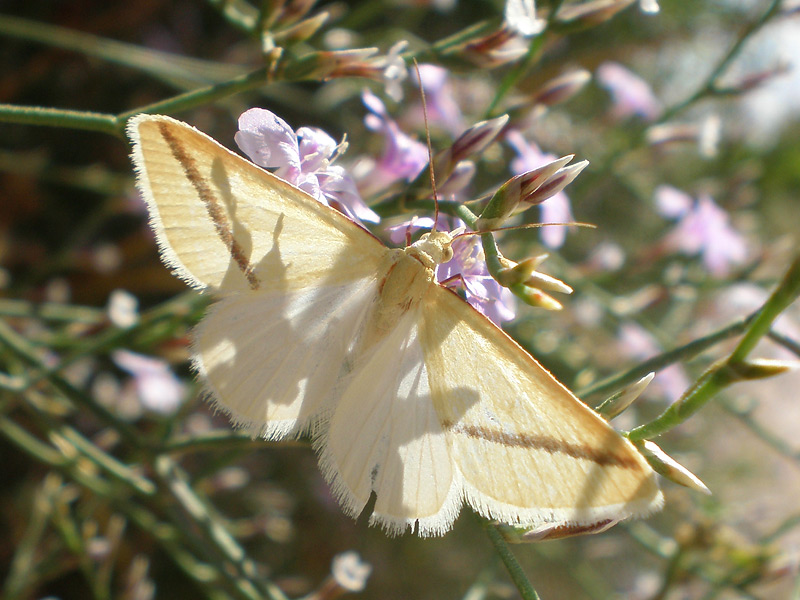
- Rhodometra sacraria

Scientific classification
- Kingdom: Animalia
- Phylum: Arthropoda
- Clade: Pancrustacea
- Class: Insecta
- Order: Lepidoptera
- Family: Geometridae
- Tribe: Rhodometrini
- Genus: Rhodometra; Meyrick, 1892

Synonyms
- Sterrhantia Butler, 1894

= Rhodometra =

Genus of moths

Rhodometra is a genus of moths in the family Geometridae erected by Edward Meyrick in 1892.

These moths have bipectinated antennae for the males; apically simple. They have relatively narrow-elongated to relatively broad forewings and a wingspan of 20–30 mm. The forewings are pale yellow, sometimes rosy and traversed by an oblique red stripe, the hindwings are plain.

== Species ==
Species include:

- Rhodometra albidaria Erschoff, 1874
- Rhodometra albipunctaria Dognin, 1917
- Rhodometra angasmarcata Hübner, 1822
- Rhodometra anthophilaria Hübner, 1809/13
- Rhodometra aucta Krausse, 1913
- Rhodometra audeoudi Prout, 1928
- Rhodometra consecraria (Boisduval, 1840)
- Rhodometra debiliaria Rothschild, 1914
- Rhodometra desertorum Staudinger, 1914
- Rhodometra elvira Thierry-Mieg, 1911
- Rhodometra excaecaria Fuchs, 1903
- Rhodometra fumosa Prout, 1937
- Rhodometra gegenaria Alphéraky, 1883
- Rhodometra incarnaria Thierry-Mieg, 1911
- Rhodometra intermediaria Turati, 1930
- Rhodometra intervenata Warren, 1902
- Rhodometra kikiae Wiltshire, 1982
- Rhodometra labdoides Herbulot, 1997
- Rhodometra lucidaria (C. Swinhoe, 1904)
- Rhodometra paralellaria Krüger, 1934
- Rhodometra participata (Walker, 1862)
- Rhodometra plectaria (Guenée, 1858)
- Rhodometra rosearia Treitschke, 1828
- Rhodometra roseata Dognin, 1917
- Rhodometra roseofimbriata Thierry-Mieg, 1911
- Rhodometra sacraria Linnaeus, 1767
- Rhodometra satura Prout, 1916
- Rhodometra sevastopuloi Carcasson, 1964
- Rhodometra subrosearia Staudinger, 1871
- Rhodometra subsacraria Staudinger, 1871
- Rhodometra virgenpamba Dognin, 1892
