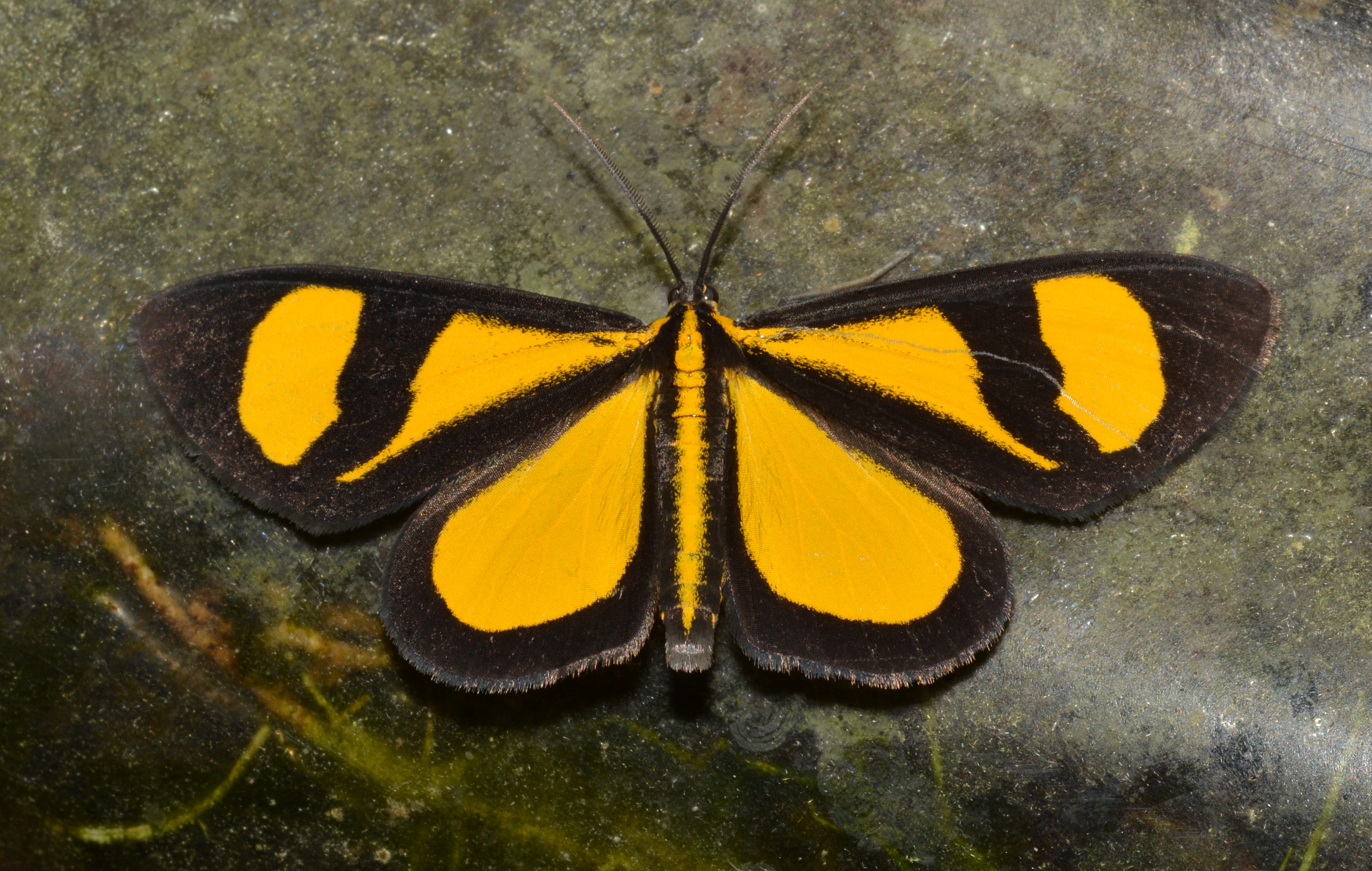
- Smicropus laeta

Scientific classification
- Kingdom: Animalia
- Phylum: Arthropoda
- Class: Insecta
- Order: Lepidoptera
- Family: Geometridae
- Tribe: Cyllopodini
- Genus: Smicropus

= Smicropus =

Genus of moths

Smicropus is a genus of moths in the family Geometridae.
