= Formiana =

Scientific classification
- Kingdom: Animalia
- Phylum: Arthropoda
- Class: Insecta
- Order: Lepidoptera
- Family: Geometridae
- Subfamily: Sterrhinae
- Genus: Formiana; Druce, 1885

Genus of moths

Formiana is a genus of moths in the family Geometridae described by Druce in 1885.
