= Atyriodes =

Scientific classification
- Kingdom: Animalia
- Phylum: Arthropoda
- Class: Insecta
- Order: Lepidoptera
- Family: Geometridae
- Subfamily: Sterrhinae
- Genus: Atyriodes; Warren, 1895

Synonyms
- Streblopoda Sick, 1937

Genus of moths

Atyriodes is a genus of moths in the family Geometridae described by Warren in 1895.

== Species ==
- Atyriodes cyrene (Druce, 1885)
- Atyriodes janeira (Schaus, 1892)
