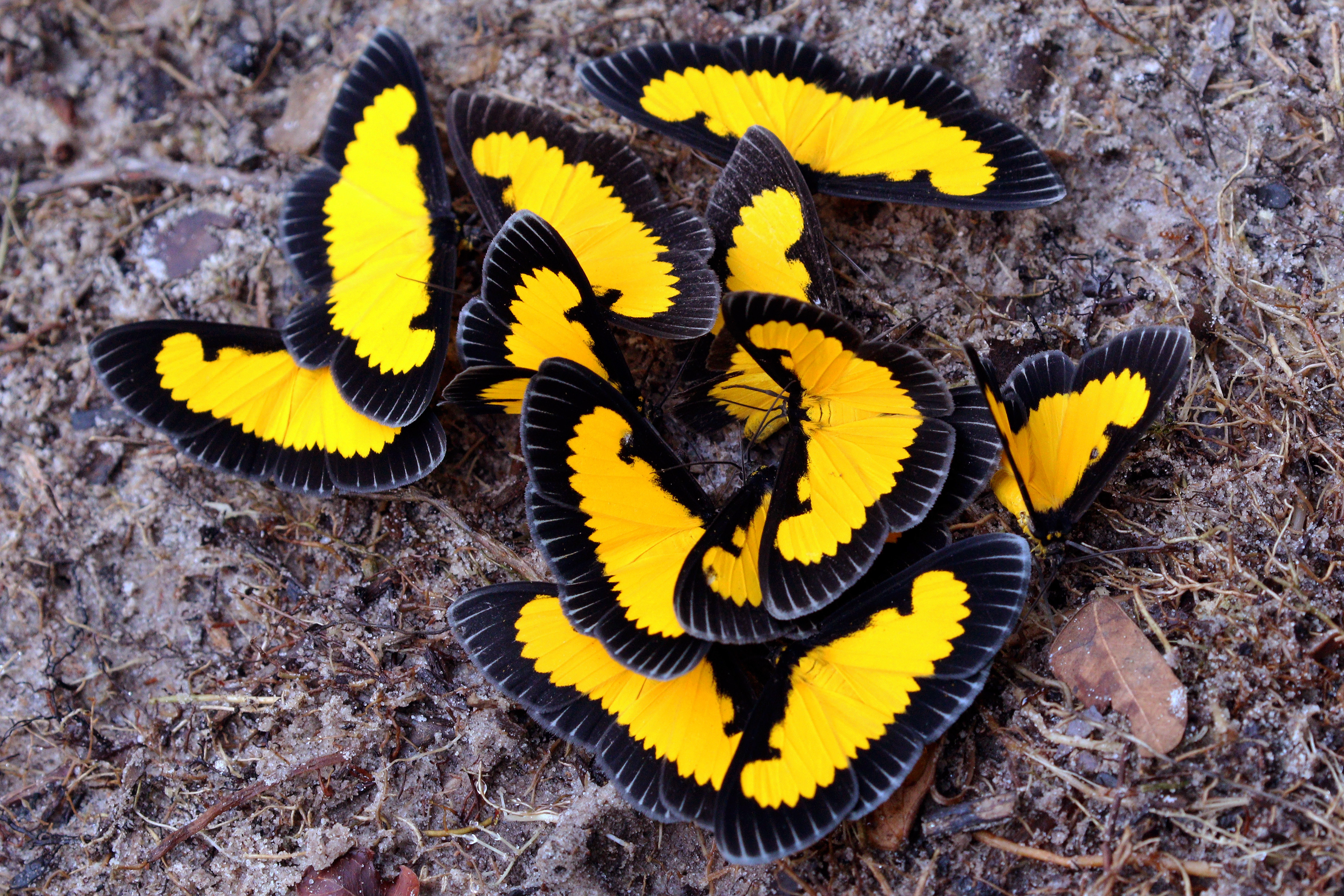
- Xanthyris flaveolata

Scientific classification
- Kingdom: Animalia
- Phylum: Arthropoda
- Class: Insecta
- Order: Lepidoptera
- Family: Geometridae
- Tribe: Rhodostrophiini
- Genus: Xanthyris; C. Felder & R. Felder, 1862

= Xanthyris =

Genus of moths

Xanthyris is a genus of moths in the family Geometridae erected by father and son entomologists Cajetan and Rudolf Felder.

== Species ==
- Xanthyris felder Felder & Felder, 1862
- Xanthyris flaveolata (Linnaeus, 1758)
- Xanthyris involuta Bastelberger, 1909
- Xanthyris planilimbata Warren, 1905
- Xanthyris superba Druce, 1903
- Xanthyris supergressa Bastelberger, 1909
