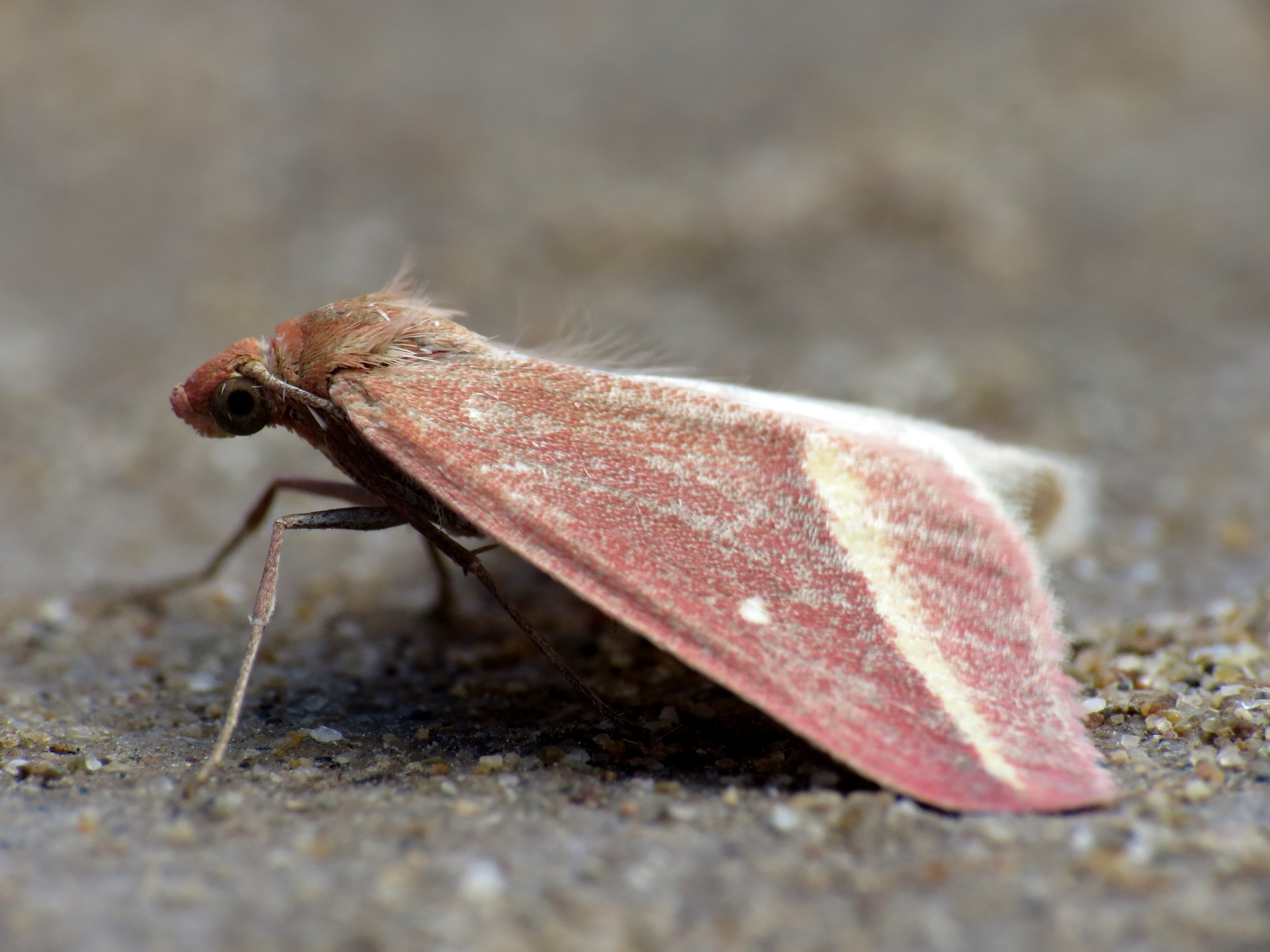
- Casilda consecraria

Scientific classification
- Kingdom: Animalia
- Phylum: Arthropoda
- Clade: Pancrustacea
- Class: Insecta
- Order: Lepidoptera
- Family: Geometridae
- Subfamily: Sterrhinae
- Tribe: Rhodometrini; Agenjo, 1952

= Rhodometrini =

Tribe of moths

Rhodometrini is a tribe of the geometer moth family (Geometridae) described by Ramón Agenjo Cecilia in 1952. It has about sixteen species in two genera and one genus with a single species tentatively associated with the tribe.

== Genera ==
- Casilda Agenjo, 1952
- Rhodometra Meyrick, 1892

== Uncertain association ==
- Ochodontia Lederer, 1853
