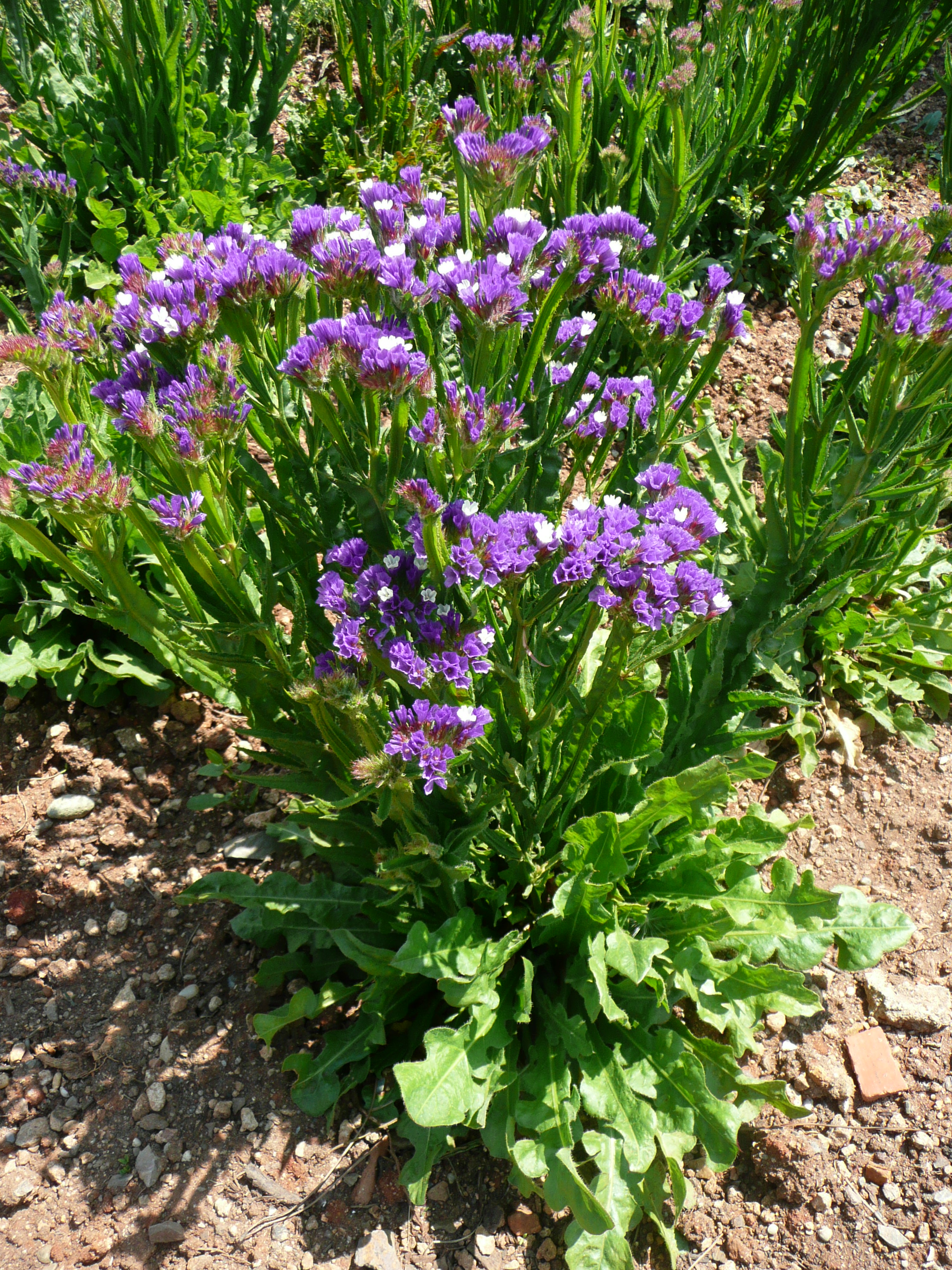
- Limonium sinuatum Nezahat Gökyiğit Park, Istanbul

Scientific classification
- Kingdom: Plantae
- Clade: Tracheophytes
- Clade: Angiosperms
- Clade: Eudicots
- Order: Caryophyllales
- Family: Plumbaginaceae
- Genus: Limonium
- Species: L. sinuatum

Binomial name
- Limonium sinuatum (L.) Mill.

= Limonium sinuatum =

Species of flowering plant

Limonium sinuatum, commonly known as wavyleaf sea lavender, statice, sea lavender, notch leaf marsh rosemary, sea pink, is a Mediterranean plant species in the family Plumbaginaceae known for its papery flowers that can be used in dried arrangements.

It is native to the whole Mediterranean Basin. It usually grows up in sandy grounds.

== Description ==
It is a short-lived perennial plant, and is often treated as an annual. The leaves are pinnate, lobed, and lance-shaped – up to 10 cm (3.9 in) long. All parts are downy. The winged flower stems appear in summer, and are about 70 cm (28 in) tall. The flowers present in short, papery clusters in colours ranging from white to pink, purple, and yellow. It has been known to become invasive.

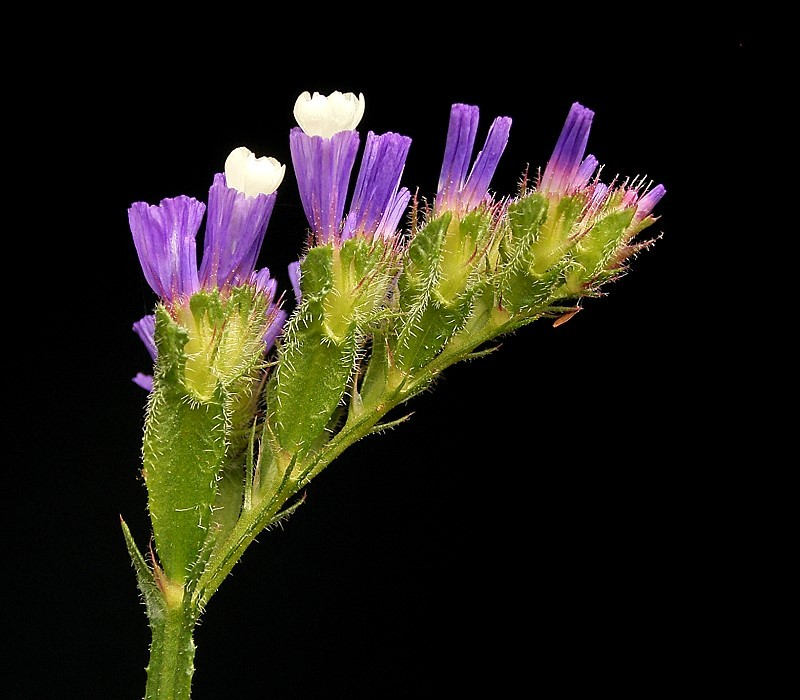
Limonium sinuatum

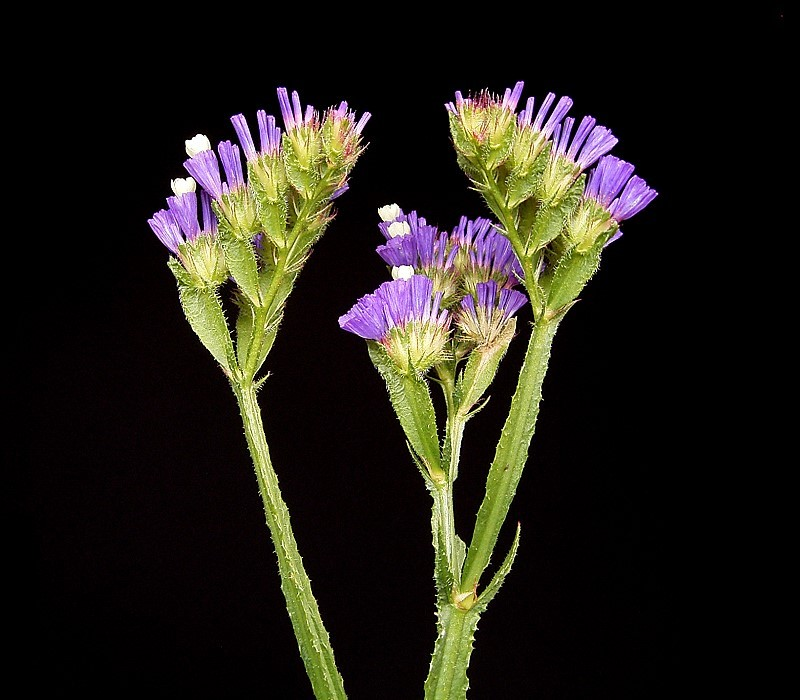
Limonium sinuatum

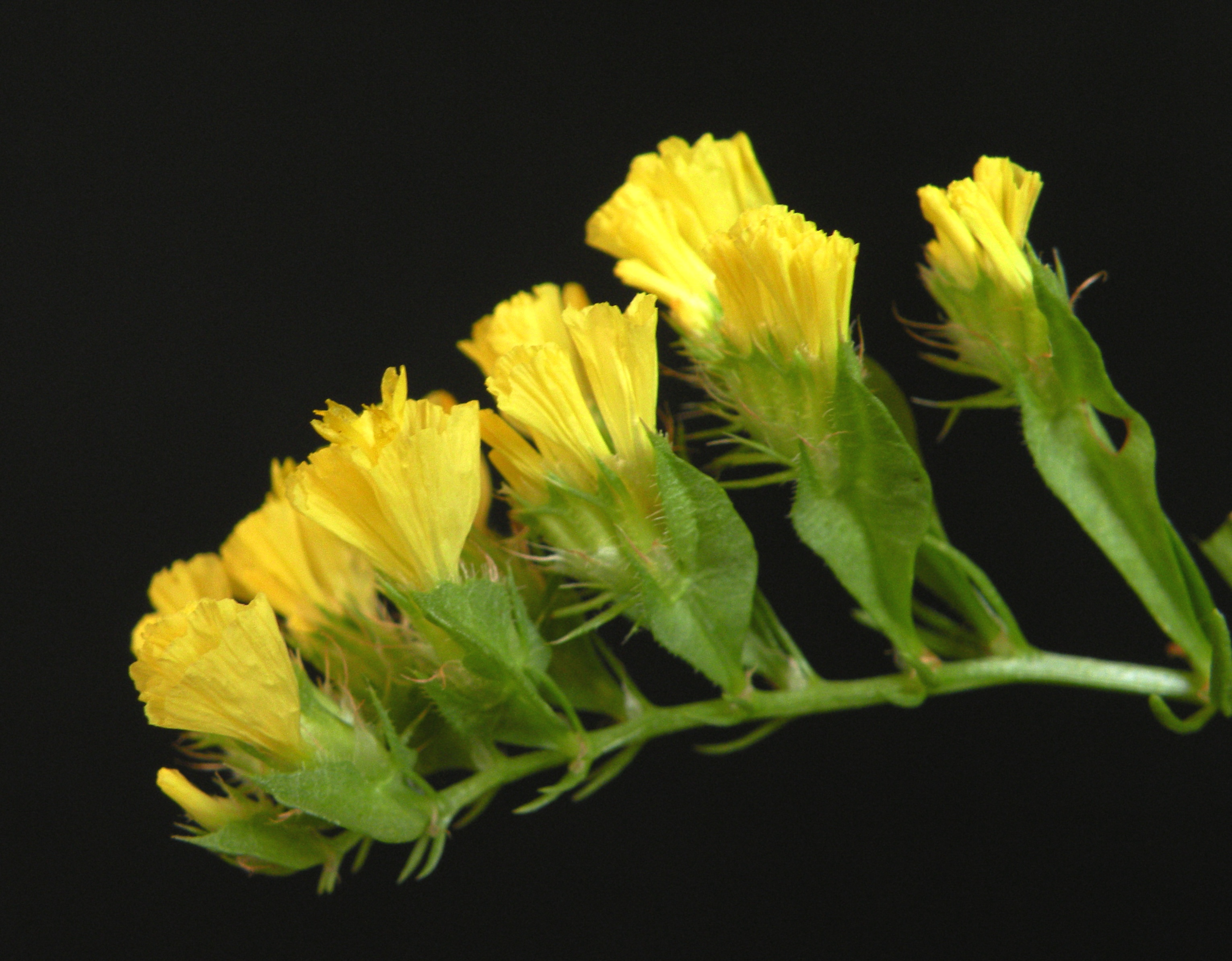
Yellow statice flowers, close up from side

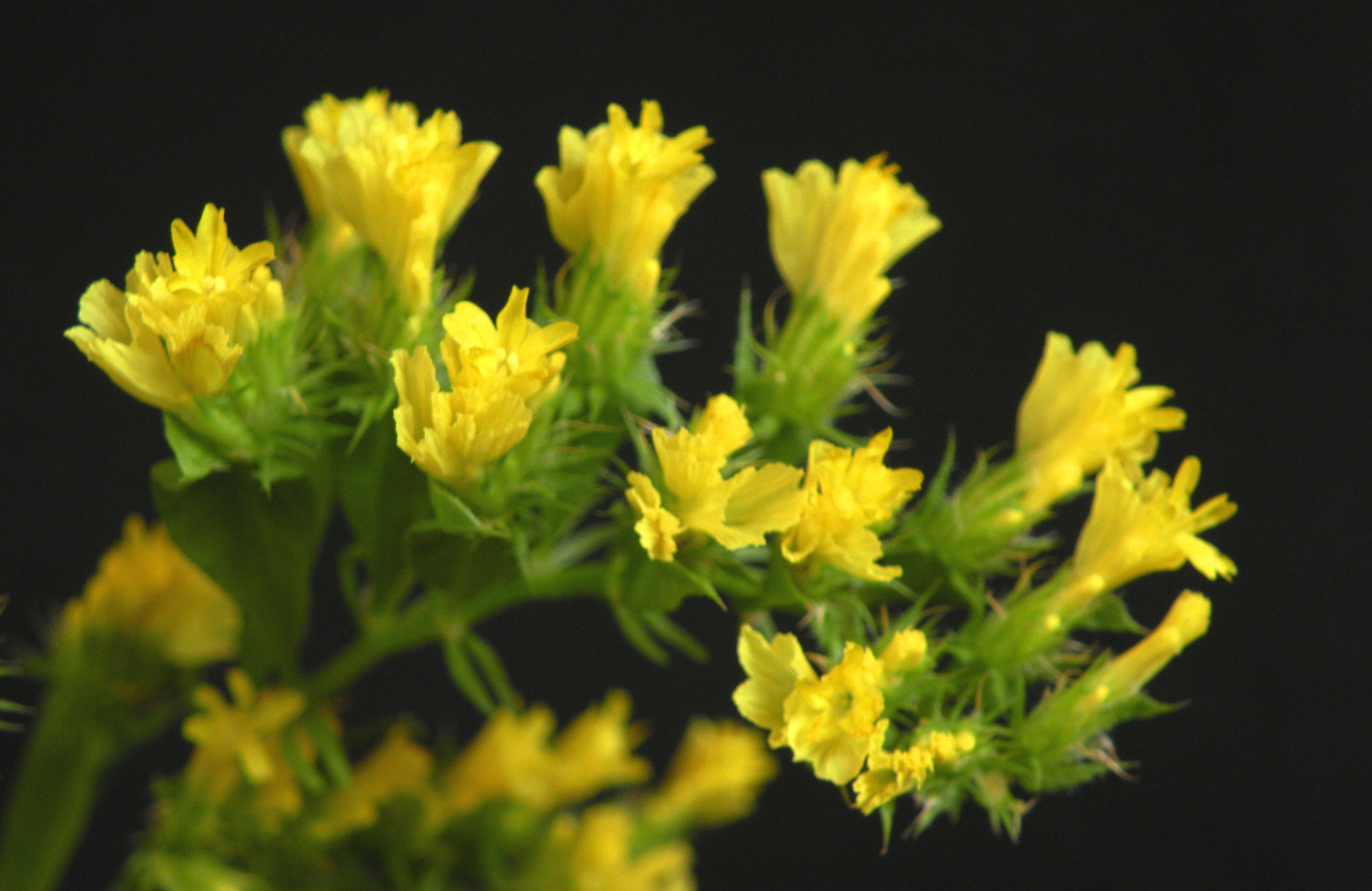
Yellow statice flowers, close up from top

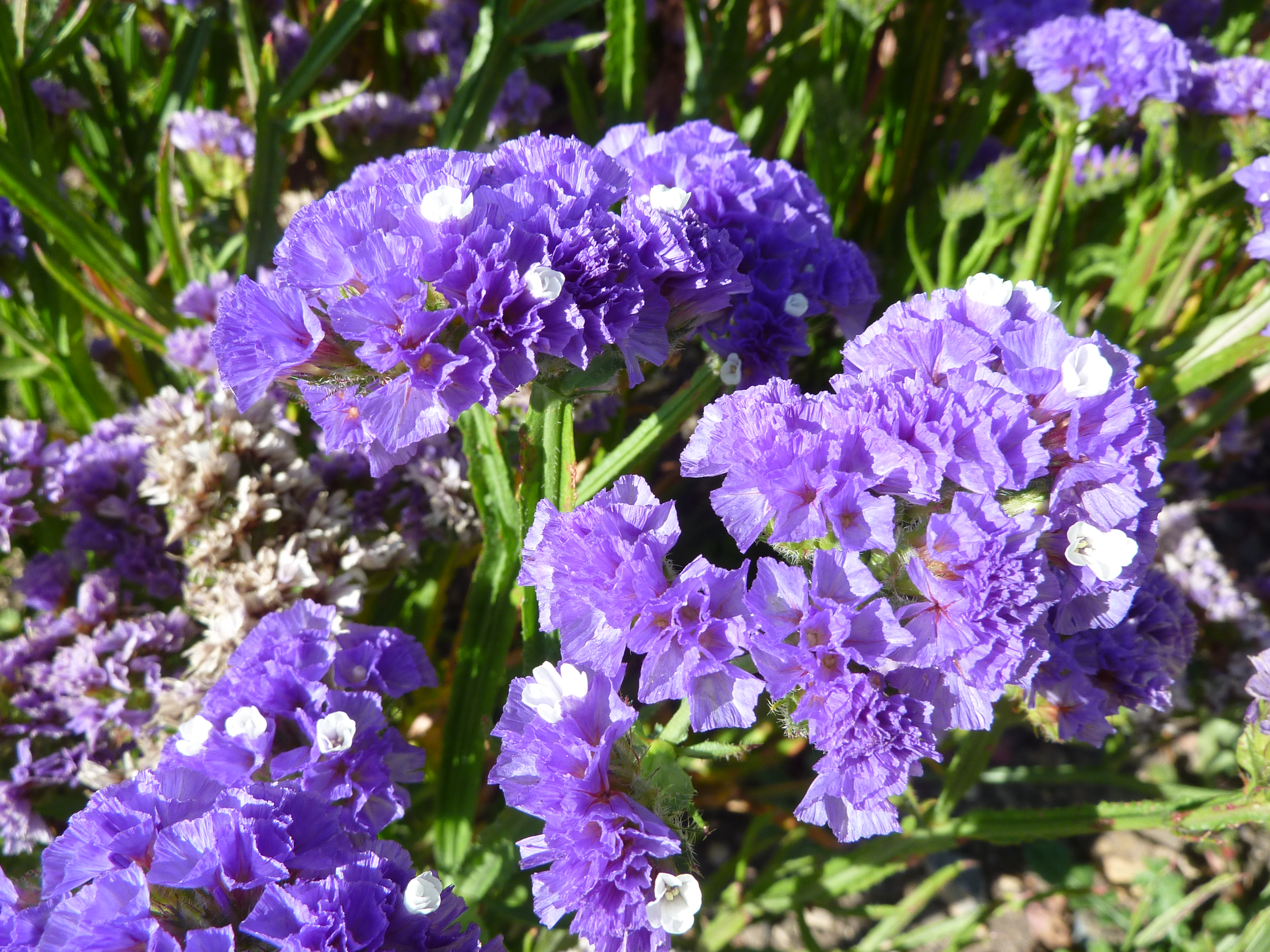
Limonium sinatum 'Midnight Blue'
