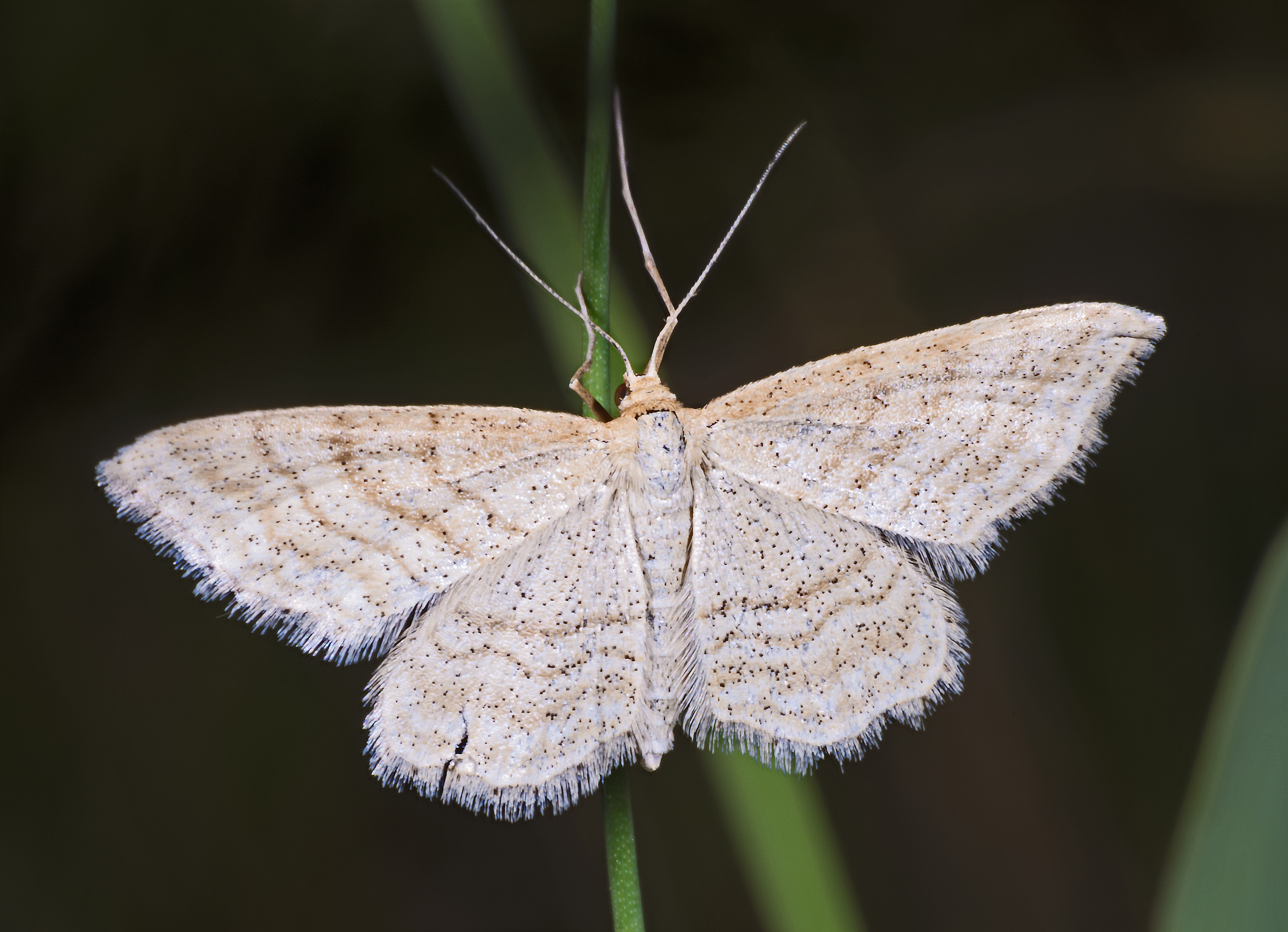
- Idaea macilentaria

Scientific classification
- Kingdom: Animalia
- Phylum: Arthropoda
- Clade: Pancrustacea
- Class: Insecta
- Order: Lepidoptera
- Family: Geometridae
- Subfamily: Sterrhinae; Meyrick, 1892

Tribes
- Cosymbiini; Cyllopodini; Lythriini; Rhodometrini; Rhodostrophiini; Scopulini; Sterrhini; Timandrini

= Sterrhinae =

Subfamily of moths

Sterrhinae is a large subfamily of geometer moths (family Geometridae) with some 3,000 described species, with more than half belonging to the taxonomically difficult, very diverse genera, Idaea and Scopula (Hausmann, 2004; Sihvonen, 2005). This subfamily was described by Edward Meyrick in 1892. They are the most diverse in the tropics with the number of species decreasing with increasing latitude and elevation (Scoble et al., 1995; Hausmann, 2001, 2004; Brehm & Fiedler, 2003).

== Characteristics ==
Sterrhinae are called waves due to the numerous wavy fasciae on the fore- and hindwings. Compared to other Geometridae, the moths are often small in size (wing span <20 mm), but size variation is considerable (Sihvonen et al., 2020). The monophyly of Sterrhinae has been postulated based on three morphological synapomorphies: the presence of one or two areoles in the forewings, in the forewing the point of origin of vein M1 is either proximal or distal to the areole, and the absence of anterolateral extensions on the male second abdominal sternite (Sihvonen & Kaila, 2004). Other diagnostic characters include length and longitudinal orientation of the forewing vein connecting the ariole with the origin of M1, and the presence of dark distal spots, which may have pale centres (Holloway, 1997). The majority of species are nocturnal, but many species are easily flushed from vegetation during the day, and a few lineages are entirely diurnal (Sihvonen et al., 2020).

== Larvae ==
Larvae of many species feed on low herbs, but species of the Cyclophora Hübner lineage are arboreal (Sihvonen & Kaila, 2004).

== Systematics ==
Sterrhinae is a junior synonym of Idaeidae (Butler, 1881). Seeing this name is hardly used in literature and Sterrhinae is widely used, this name is preferred. The tribe Lythriini with the genus Lythria (Hübner, 1823) and the species Lythria cruentaria (Hufnagel, 1767) was transferred from Larentiinae in 2008. The Larentiinae have been suggested to be the sister group of Sterrhinae based on morphology (Holloway, 1997). Characters that unite Sterrhinae and Larentiinae include the distribution of male secondary sexual organs, found mainly on the male second sternite or in the form of coremata more distally on the abdomen, the spined or rugose signum of the female corpus bursae (Holloway, 1997), the hammer-head ansa in the tympanal organ, and the absence of a tympanic lacinia in most species (Cook & Scoble, 1992). However, a molecular study done by Abraham et al. (2001), based on a very limited taxon sample, did not support the relationship between Sterrhinae/Larentiinae (Sihvonen & Kaila, 2004). Instead, Sterrhinae was found to be the sister taxon to the Geometrinae + Ennominae + Alsophilinae + Archiearinae assemblage (Sihvonen & Kaila, 2004). Sterrhinae has the presence of olefinic acetates and derivates, unlike other geometrid families, and is sometimes placed as the most basal sister groups of Geometrinae (Young, 2006; Yamamoto & Sota, 2007; Sihvonen et al., 2011).

The subfamily is divided into eight tribes:

- Cosymbiini Prout, 1911
- Cyllopodini Kirby, 1892
- Lythriini Herbulot, 1962
- Rhodometrini Agenjo, 1952
- Rhodostrophiini Prout, 1935
- Scopulini Duponchel, 1845
- Sterrhini Meyrick, 1892
- Timandrini Stephens, 1850

Based on the molecular phylogeny, and extensive morphological examination, Haemaleni (Sihvonen & Brehm) is described as a new tribe and is deemed sister to Scopulini and Lissoblemmini; Lissoblemmini (Sihvonen & Staude) is described as a new tribe and sister to Scopulini (Sihvonen et al., 2020).

Furthermore, a number of genera are unplaced to a tribe, these are:

- Chorizomena Turner, 1939 (Sterrhini?)
- Dualana Strand, 1914 (Rhodostrophiini?)
- Neothysanis Dognin, 1916 (Sterrhini?)
- Pydna Walker, 1856

It has been shown that Sterrhinae-associated taxa have been classified into incorrect subfamilies. Examples include the following transfers:

- Afrophyla (Warren, 1895) from Oenochrominae to Sterrhinae (Sihvonen & Staude, 2011)
- Aletis (Hübner, 1820) and Cartaletis (Warren, 1894) from Oenochrominae to Sterrhinae (Holloway, 1996; Sihvonen, 2005)
- Paraptychodes (Warren, 1894) from Sterrhinae to Ennominae (Staude, 2001; Sihvonen & Kaila, 2004; Staude & Sihvonen, 2014)
- Haemalea (Hubner, 1823) transferred from tentative Scopulini (Sihvonen & Kaila, 2004) to Haemaleini (Sihvonen et al., 2020)
- Crypsityla (Warren, 1900) transferred from tentative Scopulini (Sihvonen & Kaila, 2004) to Haemaleini (Sihvonen et al., 2020)
- Leptostales (Moschler, 1890) transferred from tentative Scopulini (Sihvonen & Kaila, 2004) to Haemaleini (Sihvonen et al., 2020)
- Proutoscia (Schaus, 1912) transferred from tentative Scopulini (Sihvonen & Kaila, 2004) to Haemaleini (Sihvonen et al., 2020)
- Pseudasellodes (Warren, 1904) transferred from tentative Scopulini (Sihvonen & Kaila, 2004) to Haemaleini (Sihvonen et al., 2020)
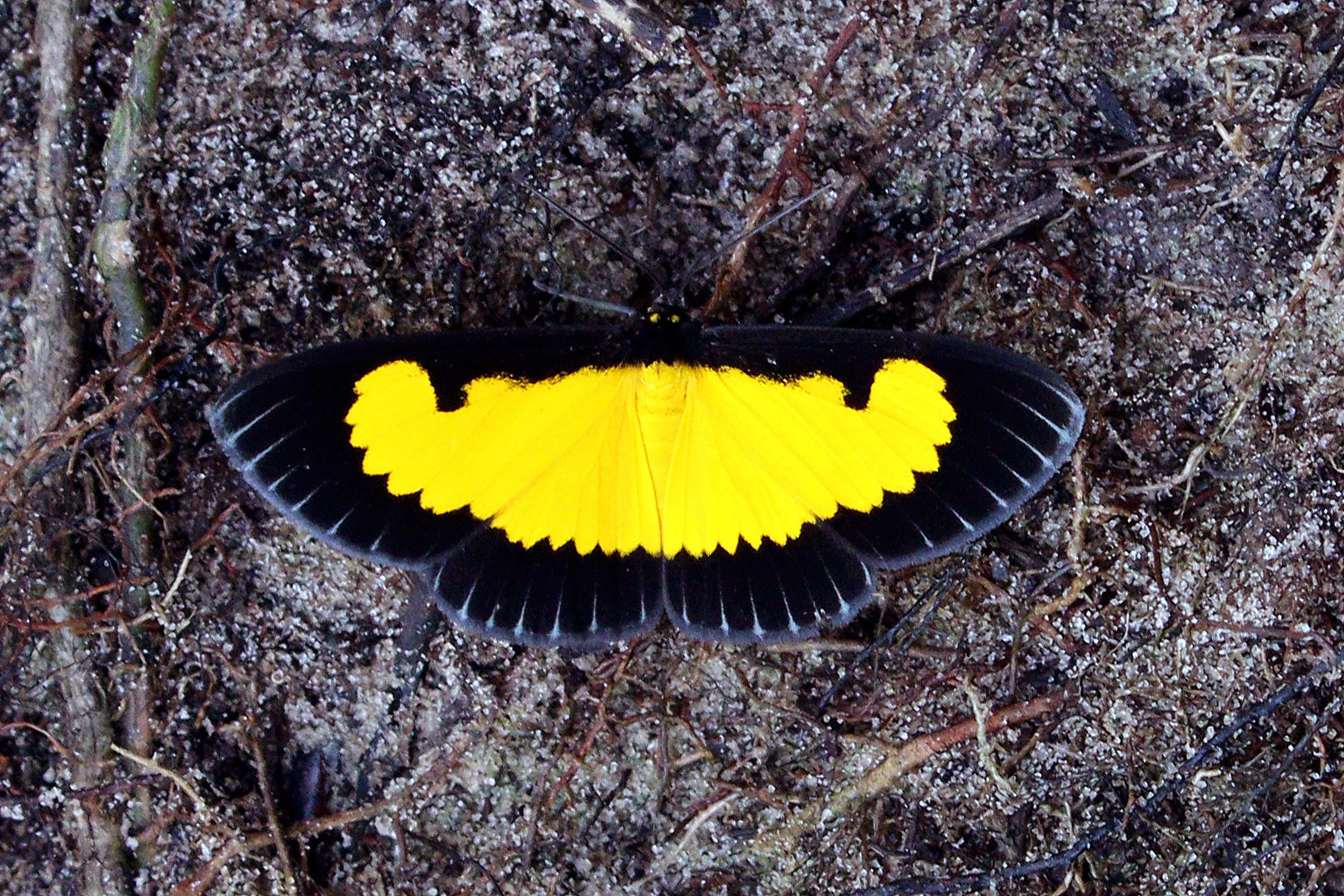
Saffron playboy, Xanthiris flaveolata

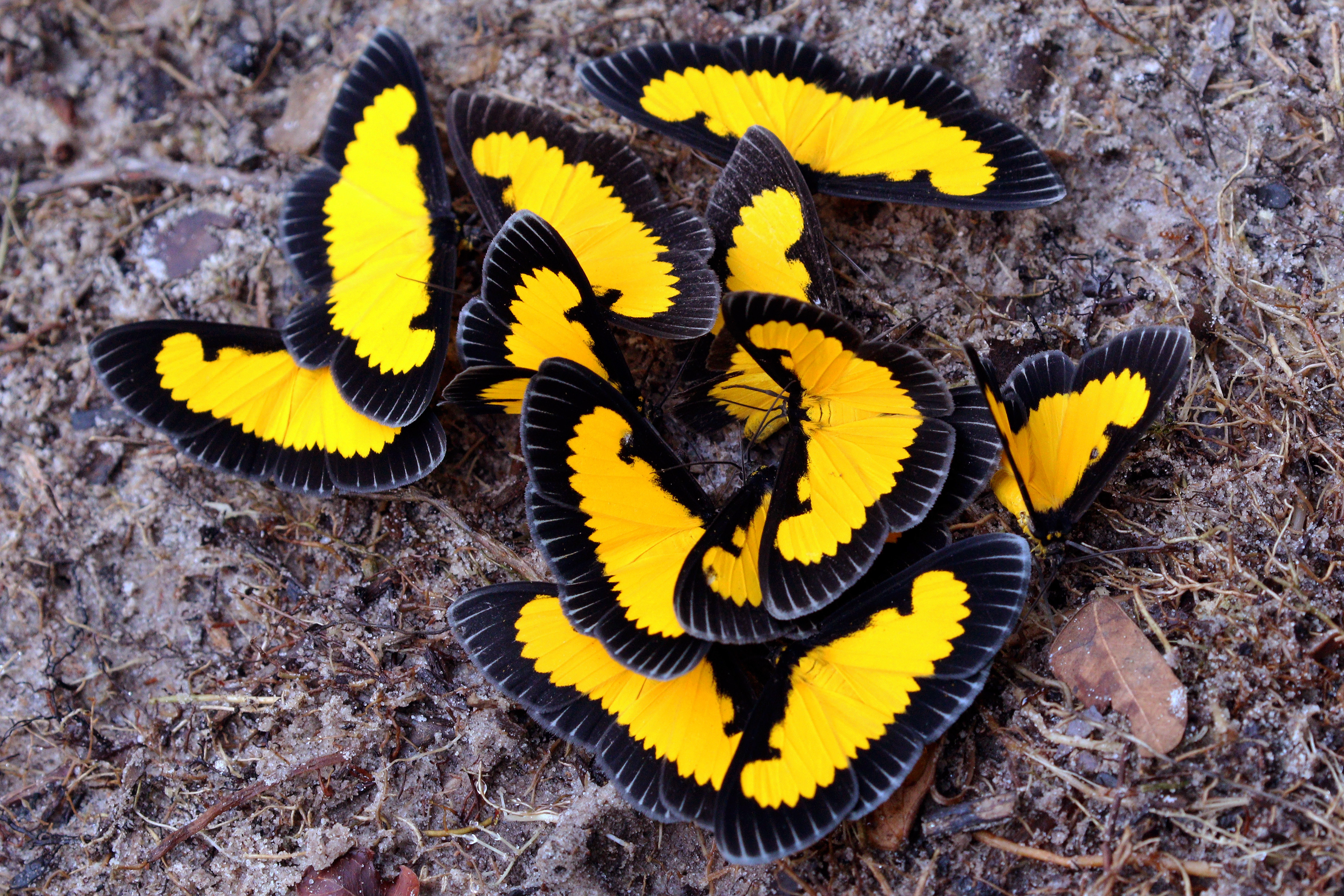
Mud-puddling, Cristalino River, Southern Amazon, Brazil

== Former genera ==
Former genera include:

- Paraptychodes Warren, 1894 (now in Ennominae)

== Literature ==
- Günter Ebert (Hrsg.): Die Schmetterlinge Baden-Württembergs Band 8, Nachtfalter VI (Spanner (Geometridae) 1. Teil), Ulmer Verlag Stuttgart 2001. ISBN 3-8001-3497-7
- Walter Forster & Theodor Wohlfahrt: Die Schmetterlinge Mitteleuropas Band V Spanner (Geometridae). 312 S., Frankh´sche Verlagshandlung Stuttgart 1973.
- M. J. Scoble: Geometrid moths of the world, a catalogue. CSIRO, Collingwood & Apollo Books, Stenstrup 1999, ISBN 87-88757-29-3
- Axel Hausmann: The Geometrid moths of Europe, 2. Sterrhinae. Apollo Books, Stenstrup 2004, ISBN 87-88757-37-4
- D. Abraham, N. Ryrholm, H. Wittzell, J. D. Holloway, M. J. Scoble, C. Lofstedt: Molecular phylogeny of the subfamilies in Geometridae (Geometroidea: Lepidoptera). Mol. Phylogenet. Evol. 20(1): 65–77 (2001)
- Sihvonen, Pasi (April 1, 2005). "Phylogeny and classification of the Scopulini moths (Lepidoptera: Geometridae, Sterrhinae)". Zoological Journal of the Linnean Society. 143 (4): 473–530. doi:10.1111/j.1096-3642.2005.00153.x.
- Sihvonen, P., & Kaila, L. (2004). Phylogeny and tribal classification of Sterrhinae with emphasis on delimiting Scopulini (Lepidoptera: Geometridae). Systematic Entomology, 29(3), 324–358. doi:10.1111/j.0307-6970.2004.00248.x
- Sihvonen, Pasi; Murillo‐Ramos, Leidys; Brehm, Gunnar; Staude, Hermann; Hausmann, Axel (April 2020). "Molecular phylogeny of Sterrhinae moths (Lepidoptera: Geometridae): towards a global classification". Systematic Entomology. 45 (3): 606–634. doi:10.1111/syen.12418. hdl:10138/330503.
- Scoble, M.J., Gaston, K.J. & Crook, A. (1995) Using taxonomic data to estimate species richness in Geometridae. Journal of the Lepidopterists' Society, 49, 136– 147.
- Hausmann, A. (2001) Introduction, Archiearinae, Orthostixinae, Desmobathrinae, Alsophilinae, Geometrinae. The Geometrid Moths of Europe, Vol. 1. Apollo Books, Stenstrup.
- Brehm, G. & Fiedler, G. (2003) Faunal composition of geometrid moths changes with altitude in an Andean montane rain forest. Journal of Biogeography, 30, 431– 440.
- Holloway, J.D. (1997) The moths of Borneo: family Geometridae, subfamilies Sterrhinae and Larentiinae. Malayan Nature Journal, 51, 1– 242.
- Cook, M.A. & Scoble, M.J. (1992) Tympanal organs of geometrid moths: a review of their morphology, function, and systematic importance. Systematic Entomology, 17, 219– 232.
- Abraham, D., Ryrholm, N., Wittzell, H., Jeremy, D.H., Scoble, M.J. & Löfstedt, C. (2001) Molecular phylogeny of the subfamilies in Geometridae (Geometroidea: Lepidoptera). Molecular Phylogenetics and Evolution, 20, 65– 77.
- Young, C.J. (2006) Molecular relationships of the Australian Ennominae (Lepidoptera: Geometridae) and implications for the phylogeny of the Geometridae from molecular and morphological data. Zootaxa, 1264, 1– 147.
- Yamamoto, S. & Sota, T. (2007) Phylogeny of the Geometridae and the evolution of winter moths inferred from a simultaneous analysis of mitochondrial and nuclear genes. Molecular Phylogenetics and Evolution, 44, 711– 723.
- Sihvonen, P. & Staude, H. (2011) Geometrid moth Afrophyla vethi (Snellen, 1886) transferred from Oenochrominae to Sterrhinae (Lepidoptera: Geometridae). Metamorphosis, 22, 102– 113 + 4 plates.
- Warren, W. (1894) New genera and species of Geometridae. Novitates Zoologicae, 1, 366– 466.
- Holloway, J.D. (1996) The moths of Borneo, part 9: Geometridae (incl. Orthostixini), Oenochrominae, Desmobathrinae, Geometrinae, Ennominae addenda. Malayan Nature Journal, 49, 147– 326.
- Staude, H.S. (2001) A revision of the genus Callioratis Felder (Lepidoptera: Geometridae: Diptychinae). Metamorphosis, 12, 125– 156.
- Staude, H.S. & Sihvonen, P. (2014) The African geometrid genus Zerenopsis C. &. R. Felder revised – moths with peculiar life histories and mating behaviours (Geometridae: Ennominae: Diptychini). Metamorphosis, 25, 11– 55.
