= Comibaena cheramota =

Scientific classification
- Kingdom: Animalia
- Phylum: Arthropoda
- Class: Insecta
- Order: Lepidoptera
- Family: Geometridae
- Subfamily: Geometrinae
- Tribe: Comibaenini
- Genus: Comibaena
- Species: C. cheramota

Binomial name
- Comibaena cheramota (Meyrick, 1886)

Synonyms
- Jodis cheramota Meyrick, 1886

Species of moth

Comibaena cheramota is a moth of the family Geometridae. It was described by Edward Meyrick in 1886. It is found on Fiji.
