= Comibaena punctaria =

Scientific classification
- Kingdom: Animalia
- Phylum: Arthropoda
- Class: Insecta
- Order: Lepidoptera
- Family: Geometridae
- Subfamily: Geometrinae
- Tribe: Comibaenini
- Genus: Comibaena
- Species: C. punctaria

Binomial name
- Comibaena punctaria (C. Swinhoe, 1904)

Synonyms
- Probolosceles punctaria C. Swinhoe, 1904

Species of moth

Comibaena punctaria is a moth of the family Geometridae first described by Charles Swinhoe in 1904. It is found on Madagascar.

The wingspan is 23 mm.
