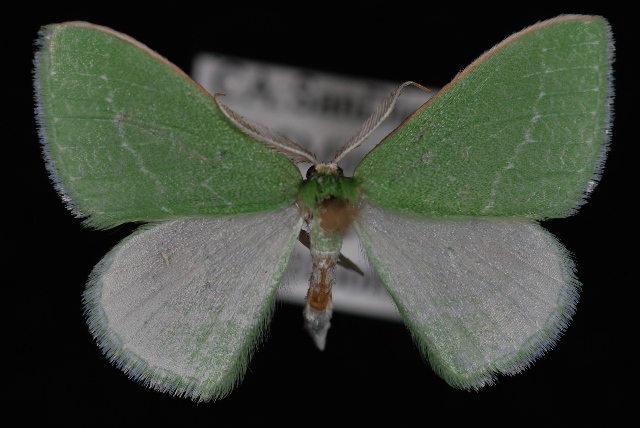

Scientific classification
- Kingdom: Animalia
- Phylum: Arthropoda
- Class: Insecta
- Order: Lepidoptera
- Family: Geometridae
- Tribe: Comibaenini
- Genus: Synchlora
- Species: S. faseolaria

Binomial name
- Synchlora faseolaria (Guenée in Boisduval & Guenée, 1858)

= Synchlora faseolaria =

Species of moth

Synchlora faseolaria is a species of emerald moth in the family Geometridae.

The MONA or Hodges number for Synchlora faseolaria is 7067.
