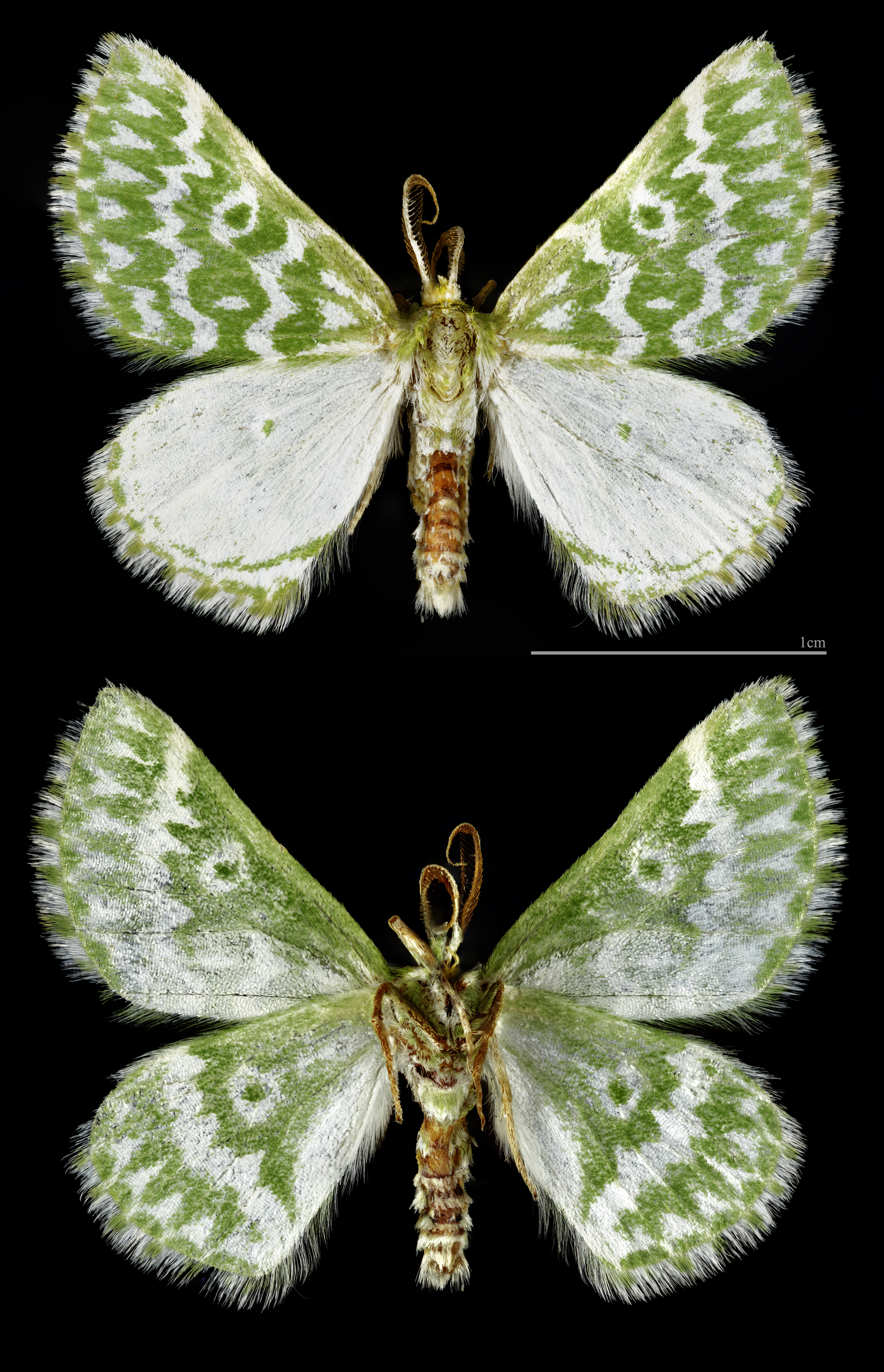

Scientific classification
- Kingdom: Animalia
- Phylum: Arthropoda
- Class: Insecta
- Order: Lepidoptera
- Family: Geometridae
- Subfamily: Geometrinae
- Tribe: Comibaenini
- Genus: Thetidia
- Species: T. plusiaria

Binomial name
- Thetidia plusiaria Boisduval, 1840

= Thetidia plusiaria =

Species of moth

Thetidia plusiaria is a moth of the family Geometridae. It is found in central and eastern Spain, the Pyrenees, on Mallorca, as well as in Algeria and Morocco. In the mountains, it is found up to altitudes of about 2,400 meters.

The wingspan is 22–27 mm. There are two generations per year with adults on wing in June and July and again in September. If conditions are favourable, a third generation may occur.

The larvae feed on Santolina, Achillea and Artemisia species.
