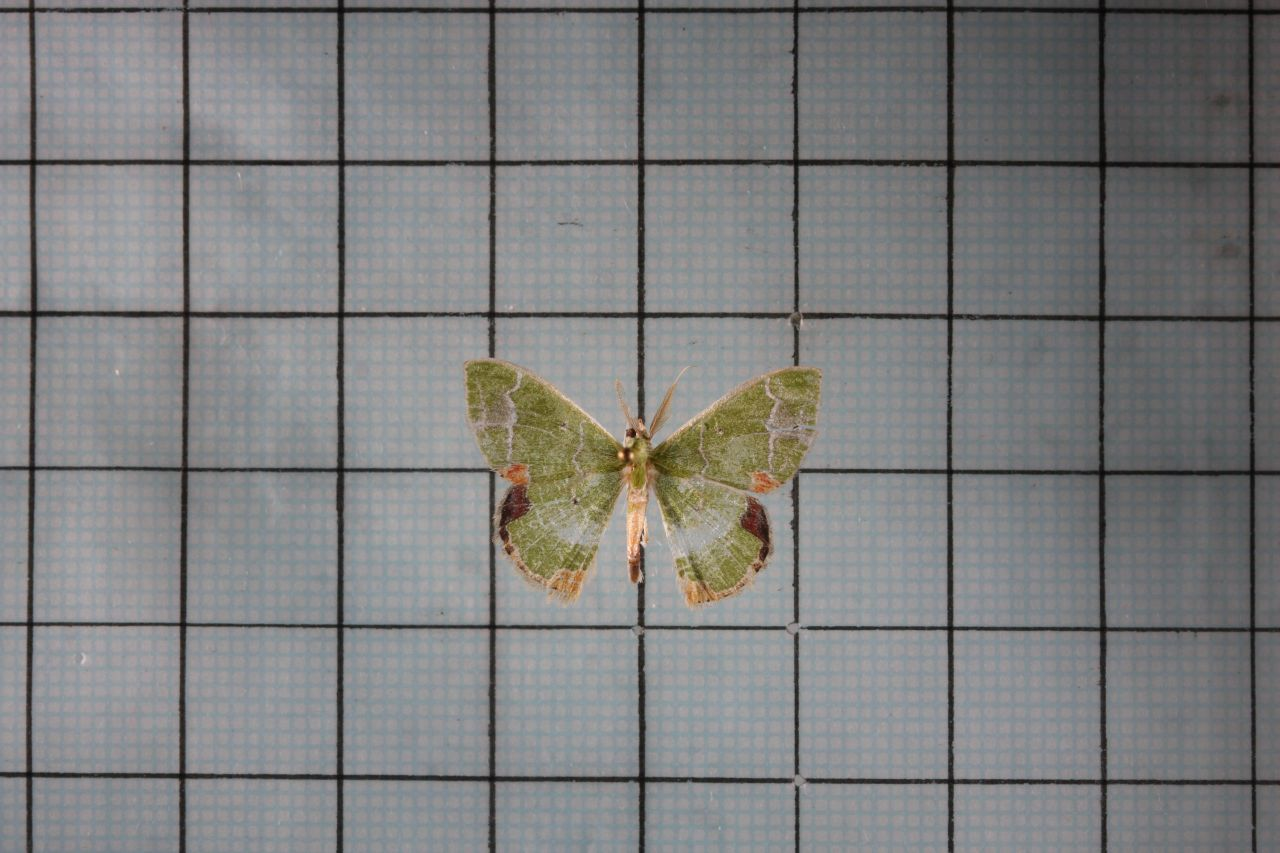

Scientific classification
- Domain: Eukaryota
- Kingdom: Animalia
- Phylum: Arthropoda
- Class: Insecta
- Order: Lepidoptera
- Family: Geometridae
- Subfamily: Geometrinae
- Tribe: Comibaenini
- Genus: Comibaena
- Species: C. delicatior

Binomial name
- Comibaena delicatior (Warren, 1897)

Synonyms
- Uliocnemis delicatior Warren, 1897

= Comibaena delicatior =

Species of moth

Comibaena delicatior is a moth of the family Geometridae. It is found in Taiwan, the Russian Far East, Korea and Japan. They are attracted to lamps.

The wingspan is 23–27 mm.
