= Synchlora pectinaria =

Scientific classification
- Domain: Eukaryota
- Kingdom: Animalia
- Phylum: Arthropoda
- Class: Insecta
- Order: Lepidoptera
- Family: Geometridae
- Tribe: Comibaenini
- Genus: Synchlora
- Species: S. pectinaria

Binomial name
- Synchlora pectinaria (Grossbeck, 1910)

Species of moth

Synchlora pectinaria is a species of emerald moth in the family Geometridae.

The MONA or Hodges number for Synchlora pectinaria is 7066.
