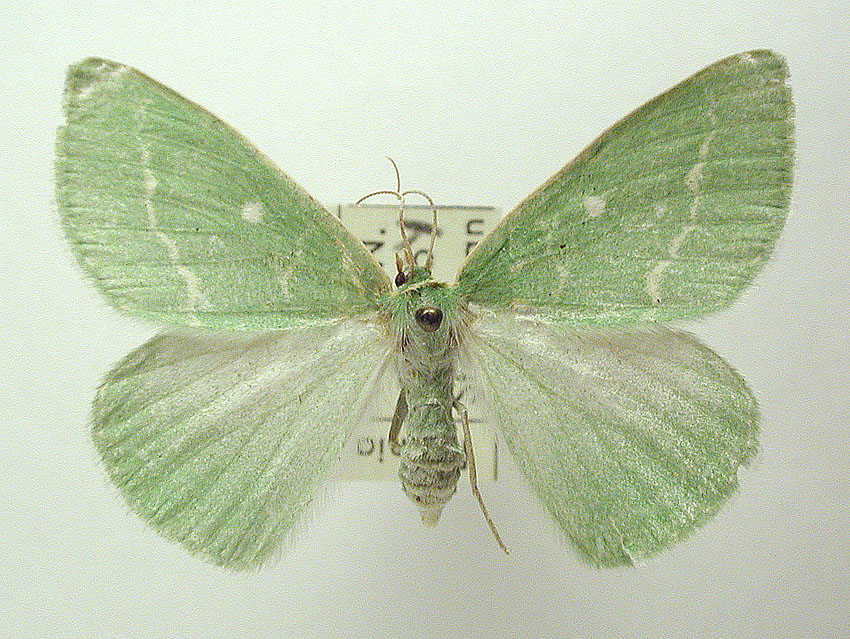

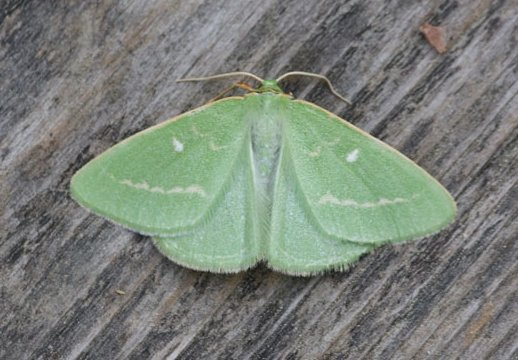

Scientific classification
- Domain: Eukaryota
- Kingdom: Animalia
- Phylum: Arthropoda
- Class: Insecta
- Order: Lepidoptera
- Family: Geometridae
- Subfamily: Geometrinae
- Tribe: Comibaenini
- Genus: Thetidia
- Species: T. smaragdaria

Binomial name
- Thetidia smaragdaria (Fabricius, 1787)

Synonyms
- Phalaena smaragdaria Fabricius, 1787; Phorodesma castiliaria Staudinger, 1892; Euchloris maritima Prout, 1935; Geometra prasinaria Eversmann, 1837; Geometra gigantea Milliere, 1874; Geometra volgaria Guenee, 1858

= Essex emerald =

Species of moth

The Essex emerald (Thetidia smaragdaria) is a moth of the family Geometridae. The species was first described by Johan Christian Fabricius in 1787 as Phalaena smaragdaria. It is distributed throughout the Palearctic region with records from many European countries. The British subspecies Thetidia smaragdaria maritima was last seen in 1991 in Kent and is now presumed extinct. In 2004 the moth was first recorded from Sweden.

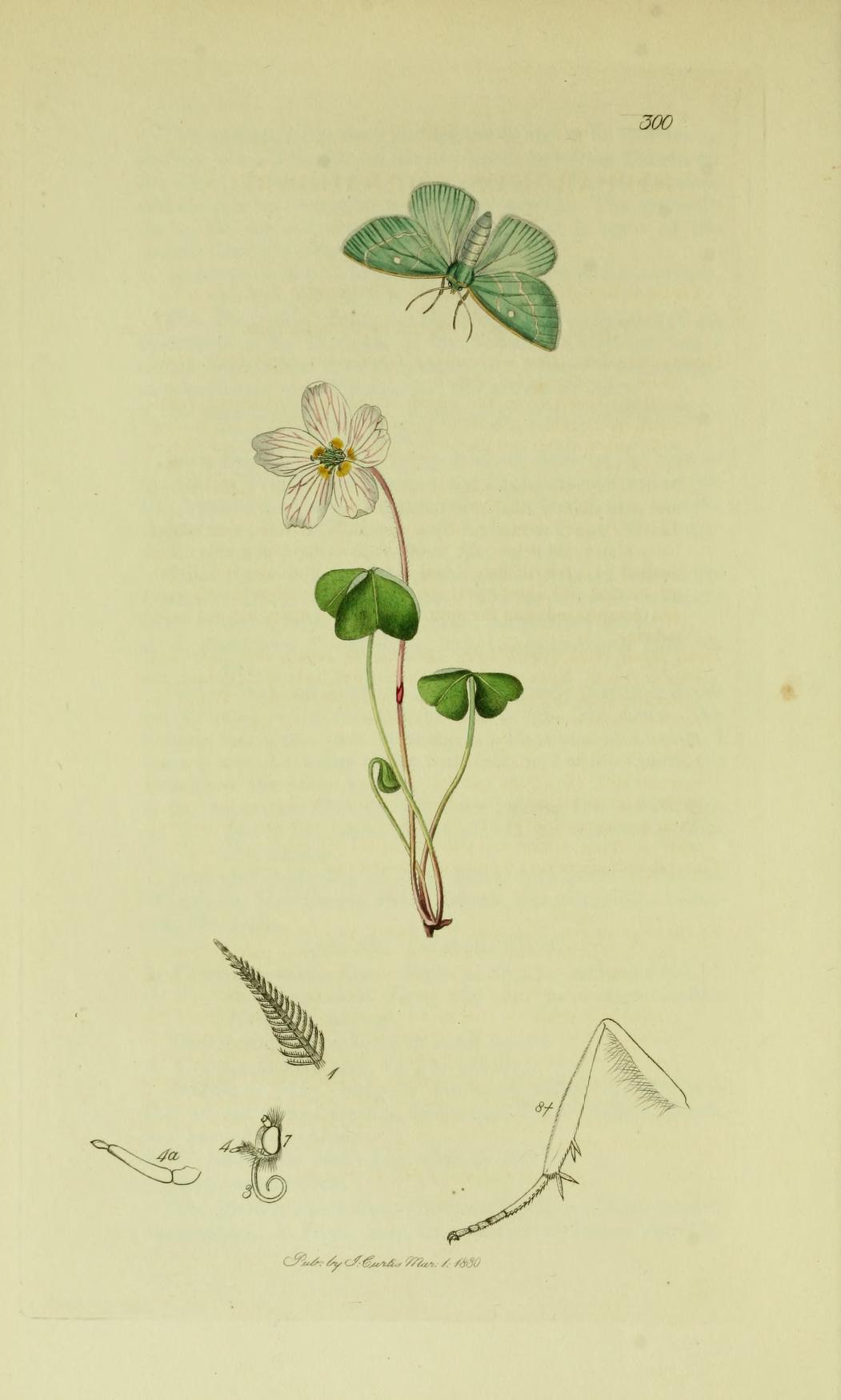
Illustration from John Curtis's British Entomology Volume 6

The wingspan is 27–35 mm. There is one generation per year with adults on wing from mid-June to mid-July.

The larvae feed on Artemisia maritima and Achillea millefolium. Larvae can be found from July to June the following year. It overwinters in the larval stage.

== Subspecies ==
- Thetidia smaragdaria smaragdaria
- Thetidia smaragdaria gigantea Milliere, 1874
- Thetidia smaragdaria maritima Prout, 1935
- Thetidia smaragdaria volgaria Guenee, 1858
