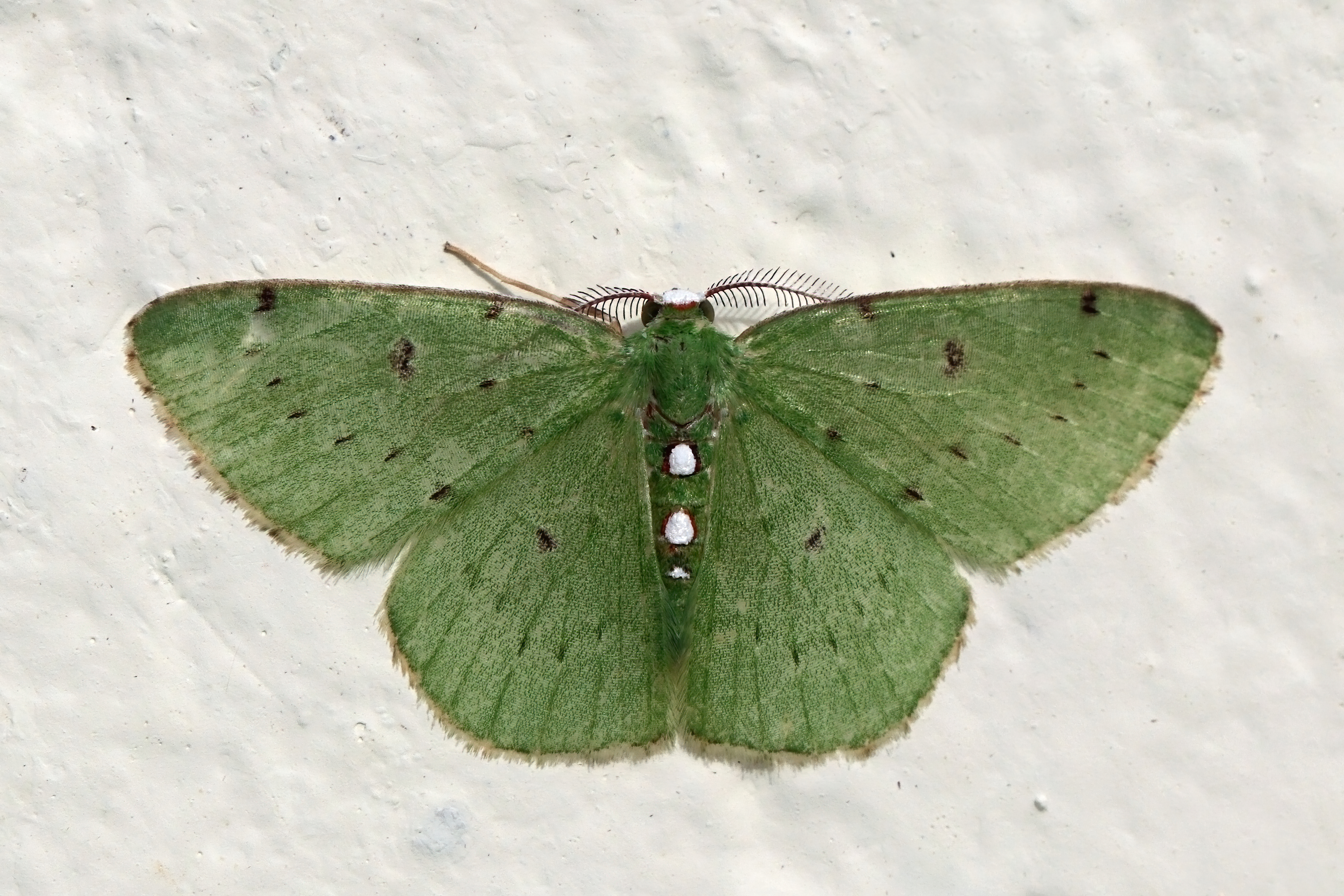
- S. herbaria, Mount Totumas cloud forest, Panama

Scientific classification
- Kingdom: Animalia
- Phylum: Arthropoda
- Class: Insecta
- Order: Lepidoptera
- Family: Geometridae
- Tribe: Comibaenini
- Genus: Synchlora; Guenée in Boisduval & Guenée, 1857

Synonyms
- Eunemoria Packard, 1873; Callisteuma Prout, 1912; Cheteoscelis Prout, 1912; Merochlora Prout, 1912

= Synchlora =

Genus of moths

Synchlora is a genus of moths in the family Geometridae erected by Achille Guenée in 1857. Adult Synchlora members often have leaf green wings, while larvae occasionally have the property of adorning themselves with pieces of plants in the pursuit of camouflage. The name of the genus comes from Greek, with "syn-" meaning "with", and "chlor" meaning "green".

== Species ==
The genus includes the following species:

- Synchlora aerata (Fabricius, 1798)
- Synchlora amplimaculata (Herbulot, 1991)
- Synchlora apicata (Warren, 1900)
- Synchlora astraeoides (Warren, 1901)
- Synchlora atrapes (Druce, 1892)
- Synchlora bidentifera (Warren, 1901)
- Synchlora bistriaria (Packard, 1876)
- Synchlora bistriata (Warren, 1897)
- Synchlora concinnaria (Schaus, 1912)
- Synchlora cupedinaria (Grote, 1880)
- Synchlora decorata (Warren, 1901)
- Synchlora delicatula (Dognin, 1909)
- Synchlora dependens (Warren, 1904)
- Synchlora despicata (Prout, 1932)
- Synchlora dilucida (Warren, 1900)
- Synchlora ephippiaria (Moschler, 1886)
- Synchlora expulsata (Walker, 1861)
- Synchlora faseolaria (Guenee, 1857)
- Synchlora fringillata (Schaus, 1897)
- Synchlora frondaria Guenee, 1858
- Synchlora gerularia (Hubner, 1823)
- Synchlora graefiaria (Hulst, 1886)
- Synchlora hebescens (Prout, 1933)
- Synchlora herbaria (Fabricius, 1794)
- Synchlora indecora (Prout, 1916)
- Synchlora irregularia (Barnes & McDunnough, 1918)
- Synchlora isolata (Warren, 1900)
- Synchlora leucoceraria (Snellen, 1874)
- Synchlora magnaria (Bastelberger, 1911)
- Synchlora merlinaria (Schaus, 1940)
- Synchlora naenia (Druce, 1892)
- Synchlora noel (Sperry, 1949)
- Synchlora orthogramma (Dyar, 1912)
- Synchlora pectinaria (Grossbeck, 1910)
- Synchlora pomposa (Dognin, 1898)
- Synchlora pulchrifimbria (Warren, 1907)
- Synchlora rufilineata (Warren, 1897)
- Synchlora superaddita (Prout, 1913)
- Synchlora suppomposa (Prout, 1916)
- Synchlora tenuimargo (Warren, 1905)
- Synchlora venustula (Dognin, 1910)
- Synchlora xysteraria (Hulst, 1886)
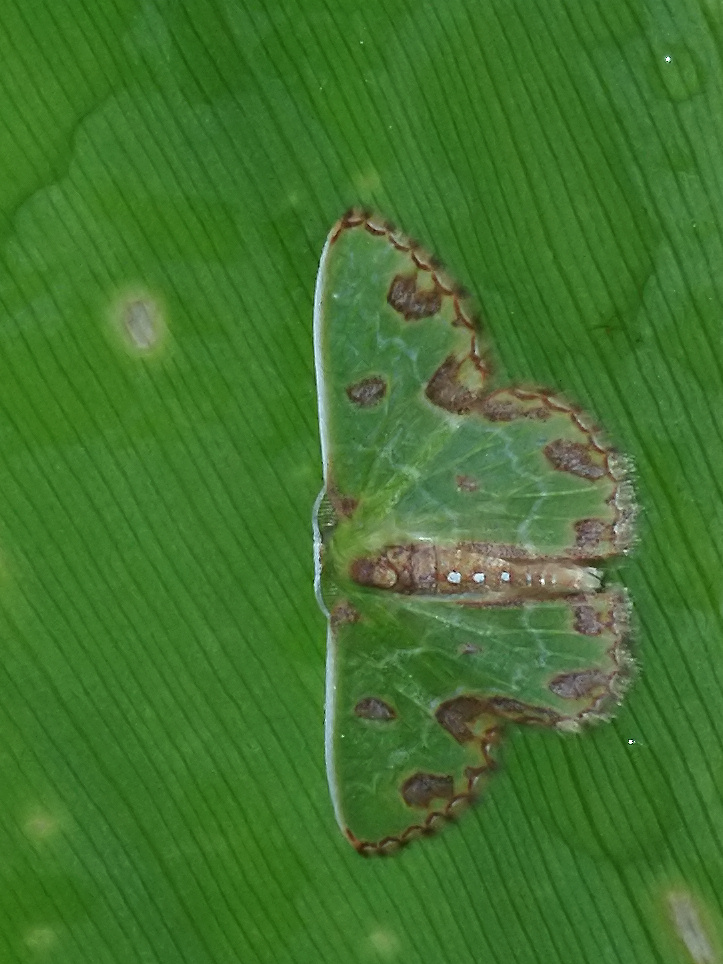
S. gerularia

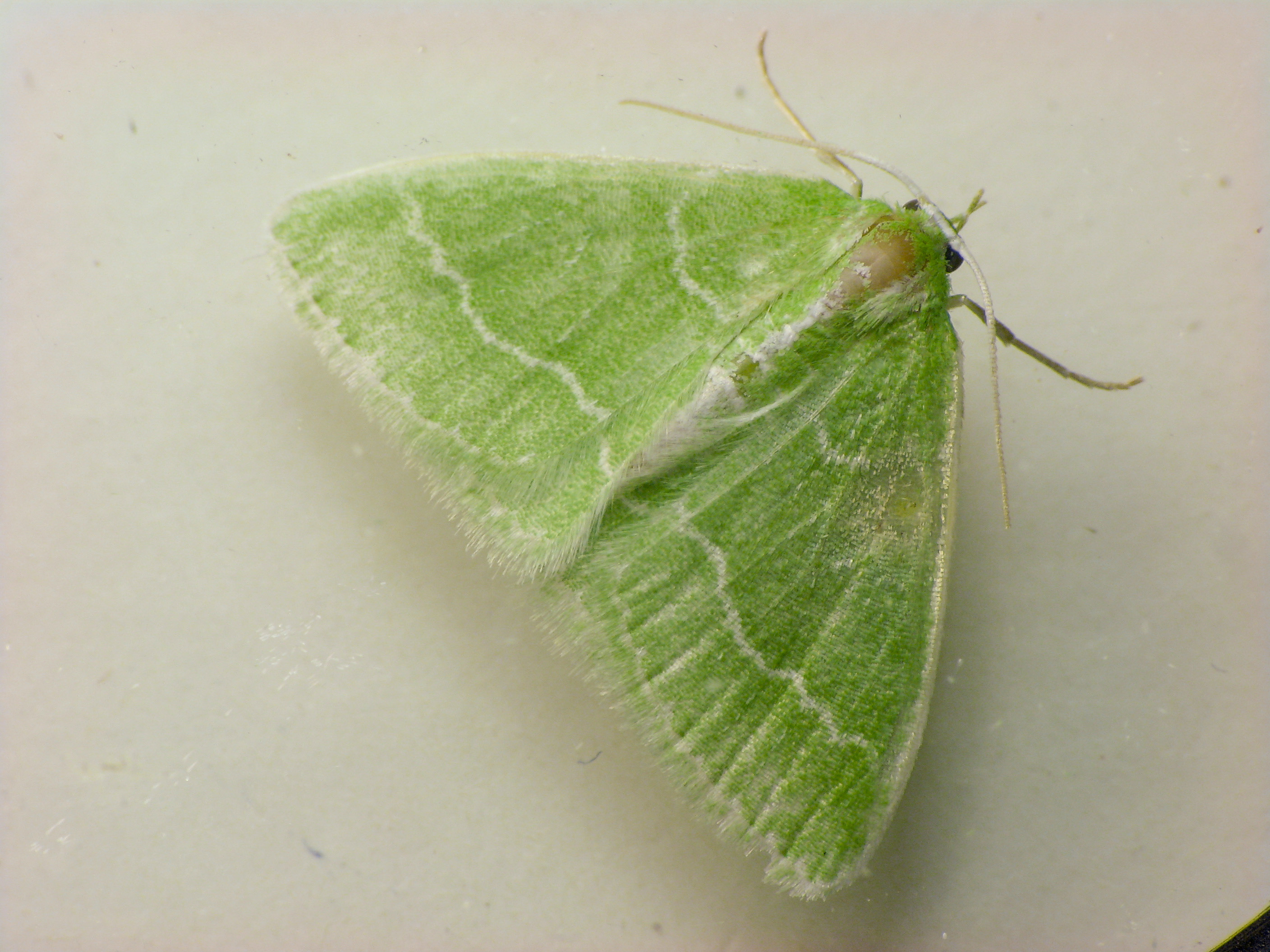
S. aerata Adult female

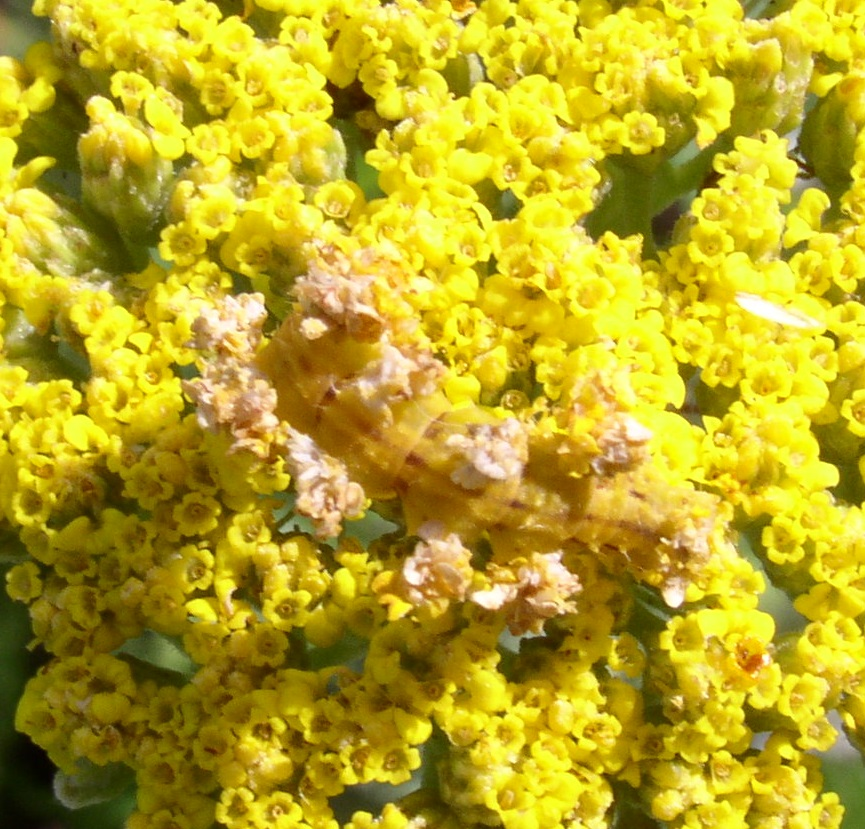
Camouflaged S. aerata caterpillar
