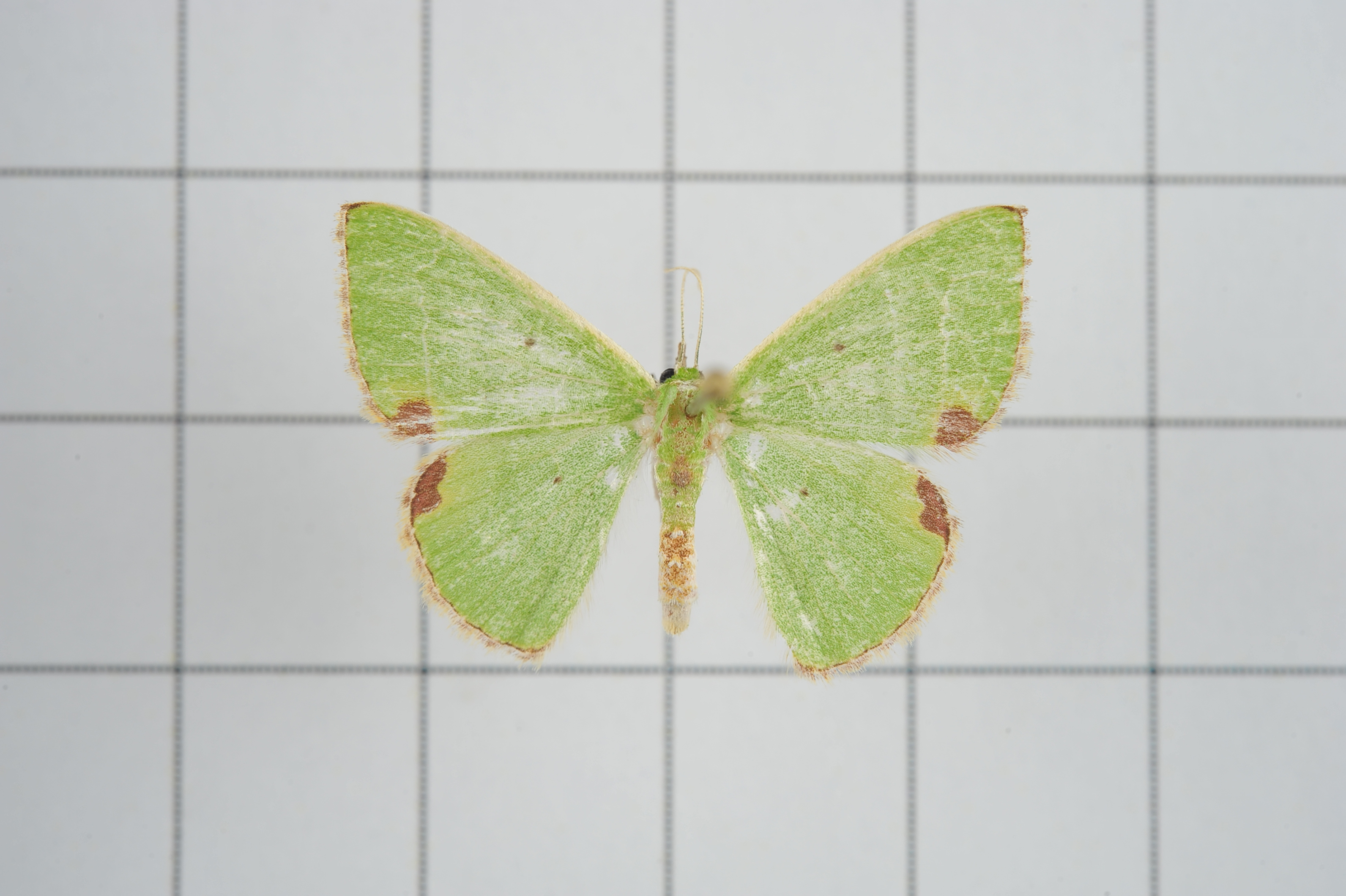

Scientific classification
- Kingdom: Animalia
- Phylum: Arthropoda
- Class: Insecta
- Order: Lepidoptera
- Family: Geometridae
- Genus: Comibaena
- Species: C. cassidara

Binomial name
- Comibaena cassidara (Guenée, 1857)

Synonyms
- Phodoresma [sic] cassidara Guenée, 1857; Geometra detenta Walker, 1861; Geometra dissessa Walker, 1861; Geometra dentata Moore, 1867; Comibaena cassidara Guenée, Holloway, 1976

= Comibaena cassidara =

Species of moth

Comibaena cassidara is a moth of the family Geometridae first described by Achille Guenée in 1857. It is found in Sri Lanka, India, Nepal, Pakistan, China, Thailand, Philippines, Malaysia, Singapore and Borneo.

It is typically a green colored moth with narrowly rufous-brown tornus of forewing and apex of hindwing. Black discal spots are very small. Forewing has a faint, pale antemedial line. Caterpillar is grey to brown in mottled appearance. Body has small conical spines. Long setiferous fleshy projections arise from thorax and abdomen. Pupation occurs in a loose, silken cocoon incorporating frass. The caterpillar is known to feed on Glycosmis pentaphylla, Anacardium occidentale, Mangifera indica, Cuscuta, Flemingia macrophylla, Ziziphus, Ixora, Lagerstroemia indica, Ziziphus jujuba, Ziziphus mauritiana and Acacia nilotica.
