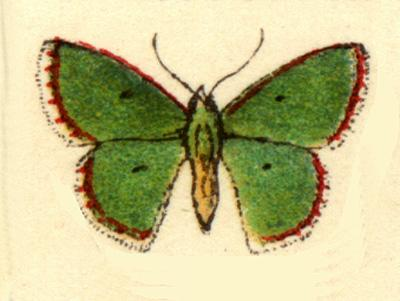

Scientific classification
- Domain: Eukaryota
- Kingdom: Animalia
- Phylum: Arthropoda
- Class: Insecta
- Order: Lepidoptera
- Family: Geometridae
- Genus: Synchlora
- Species: S. ephippiaria

Binomial name
- Synchlora ephippiaria (Möschler, 1886)

Synonyms
- Cambogia ephippiaria Möschler, 1886

= Synchlora ephippiaria =

Species of moth

Synchlora ephippiaria is a moth of the family Geometridae. It is found on Jamaica and in Peru.
