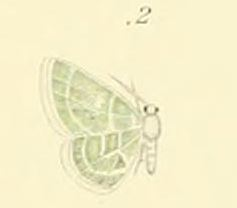
- Synchlora fringillata

Scientific classification
- Domain: Eukaryota
- Kingdom: Animalia
- Phylum: Arthropoda
- Class: Insecta
- Order: Lepidoptera
- Family: Geometridae
- Genus: Synchlora
- Species: S. fringillata

Binomial name
- Synchlora fringillata (Schaus, 1897)

Synonyms
- Aplodes fringillata Schaus, 1897

= Synchlora fringillata =

Species of moth

Synchlora fringillata is a moth in the family Geometridae. It is found in Brazil. The type was found in the state of Paraná.
