= Comibaena integranota =

Scientific classification
- Kingdom: Animalia
- Phylum: Arthropoda
- Clade: Pancrustacea
- Class: Insecta
- Order: Lepidoptera
- Family: Geometridae
- Genus: Comibaena
- Species: C. integranota

Binomial name
- Comibaena integranota (Hampson, 1893)

Synonyms
- Chlorochaeta integranota Hampson, 1893; Comiboena integranota Hampson, 1893

Species of moth

Comibaena integranota is a moth of the family Geometridae first described by George Hampson in 1893. It is found in Sri Lanka and South India.

The antenna of the male are bipectinate (comb like on both sides) and the female are filiform (thread like). The apex of the forewing is blunt and of the hindwing is round. Wings green. Hindwing usually with postmedial line absent. White to brown blotches found.
