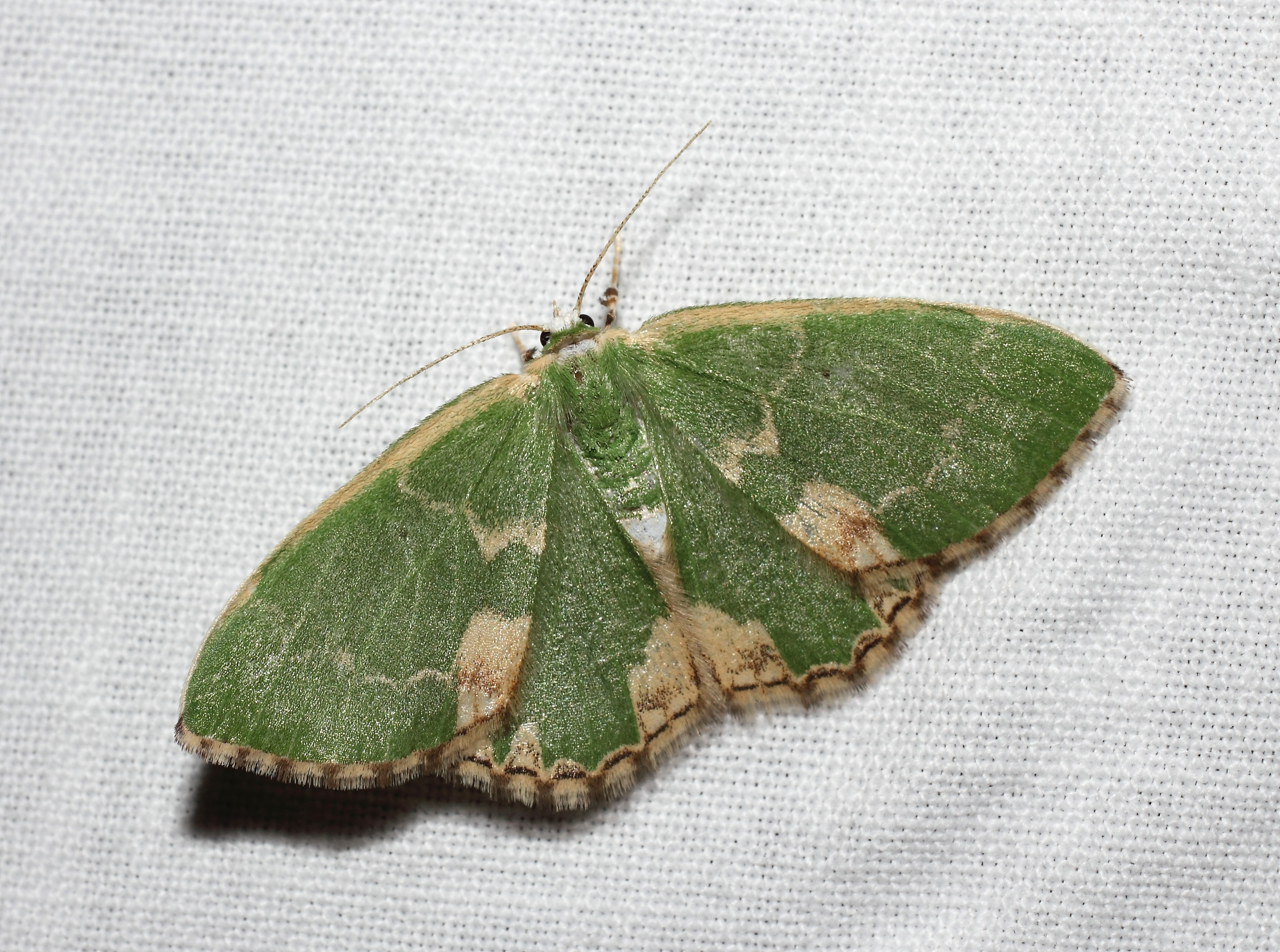
- Comibaena bajularia

Scientific classification
- Kingdom: Animalia
- Phylum: Arthropoda
- Clade: Pancrustacea
- Class: Insecta
- Order: Lepidoptera
- Family: Geometridae
- Subfamily: Geometrinae
- Tribe: Comibaenini
- Genus: Comibaena; Hübner, [1823]

Synonyms
- Phorodesma Boisduval, 1840; Comobaena Agassiz, 1847; Uliocnemis Warren, 1893; Colutoceras Warren, 1895; Myrtea Gumppenberg, 1895 (preocc. Turton, 1822); Probolosceles Warren, 1896; Probolosceles Meyrick, 1897; Chlorochaeta Warren, 1904

= Comibaena =

Genus of moths

Comibaena is a genus of moths in the family Geometridae. It was described by Jacob Hübner in 1823.

== Description ==
It differs from Agathia in the antennae being bipectinated (comb like on both sides) to three-fourths length in both sexes. The hind tibia of the male is not dilated. Hindwings with veins 6 and 7 stalked.

== Species ==
- Comibaena albimarginata (Warren, 1893)
- Comibaena amoenaria (Oberthür, 1880)
- Comibaena argentataria Leech, 1897
- Comibaena attenuata (Warren, 1896)
- Comibaena bajularia (Denis & Schiffermüller, 1775) – blotched emerald
- Comibaena biplaga Walker, 1861
- Comibaena cassidara (Guenée, 1857)
- Comibaena cheramota Meyrick
- Comibaena connata (Warren, 1898)
- Comibaena delicatior (Warren, 1897)
- Comibaena diluta (Warren, 1895)
- Comibaena falcipennis (Yazaki, 1991)
- Comibaena fuscidorsata Prout, 1912
- Comibaena integranota (Hampson, 1893)
- Comibaena leucochloraria (Mabille, 1880)
- Comibaena leucospilata Walker
- Comibaena longipennis Warren
- Comibaena mariae (Lucas, 1888)
- Comibaena meyricki Prout
- Comibaena pictipennis Bulter, 1880
- Comibaena procumbaria (Pryer, 1877)
- Comibaena pseudoneriaria Wehrli, 1926
- Comibaena punctaria (Swinhoe, 1904)
- Comibaena quadrinotata Butler, 1889
- Comibaena rhodolopha Prout, 1915
- Comibaena serrulata D. S. Fletcher, 1963
- Comibaena subdelicata Inoue, 1985
- Comibaena takasago Okana, 1960
- Comibaena tancrei Graeser, 1889
- Comibaena tenuisaria (Graeser, 1888)
