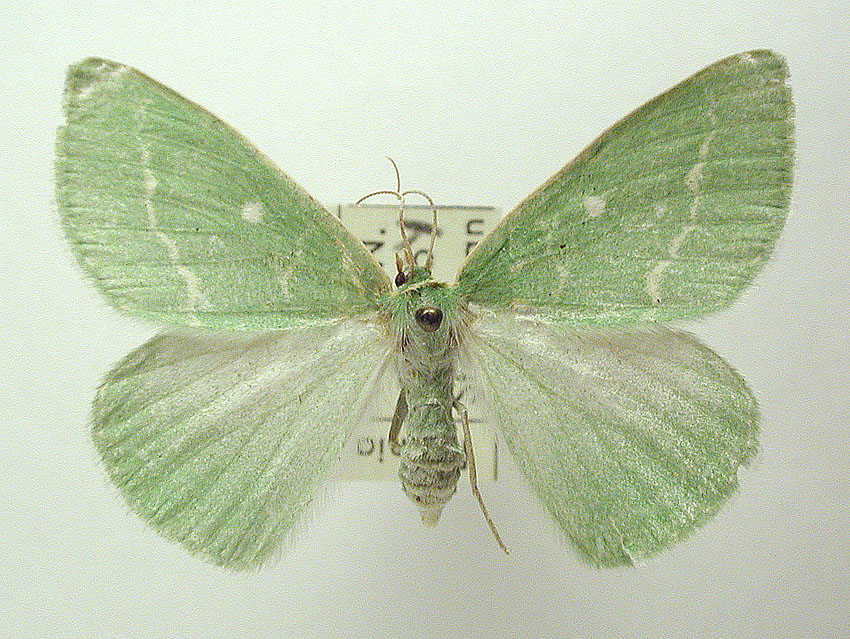
- Thetidia smaragdinia

Scientific classification
- Kingdom: Animalia
- Phylum: Arthropoda
- Class: Insecta
- Order: Lepidoptera
- Family: Geometridae
- Subfamily: Geometrinae
- Tribe: Comibaenini
- Genus: Thetidia; Boisduval, 1840

Synonyms
- Aglossochloris Prout, 1912; Antonechloris Raineri, 1994; Euchloris Hubner, 1823

= Thetidia =

Genus of moths

Thetidia is a genus of moths in the family Geometridae.

== Species ==
- Thetidia albocostaria (Bremer, 1864)
- Thetidia albosagittata (Ebert, 1965)
- Thetidia atyche (Prout, 1935)
- Thetidia bilineata Hausmann, 1991
- Thetidia chlorophyllaria (Hedemann, 1879)
- Thetidia correspondens (Alpheraky, 1883)
- Thetidia crucigerata (Christoph, 1887)
- Thetidia euryrithra (Prout, 1935)
- Thetidia fulminaria (Lederer, 1871)
- Thetidia hammeri (Ebert, 1965)
- Thetidia hazara (Ebert, 1965)
- Thetidia kansuensis (Djakonov, 1936)
- Thetidia mabillei (Thierry-Mieg, 1893)
- Thetidia pallidmarginata (Pajni & Walia, 1984)
- Thetidia persica Hausmann, 1996
- Thetidia plusiaria Boisduval, 1840
- Thetidia radiata Walker, 1863
- Thetidia recta (Brandt, 1941)
- Thetidia sardinica (Schawerda, 1934)
- Thetidia serraria (Staudinger, 1892)
- Thetidia silvia Hausmann, 1991
- Thetidia smaragdaria (Fabricius, 1787)
- Thetidia smaragdularia (Staudinger, 1892)
- Thetidia undulilinea (Warren, 1905)
- Thetidia volgaria (Guenee, 1858)
