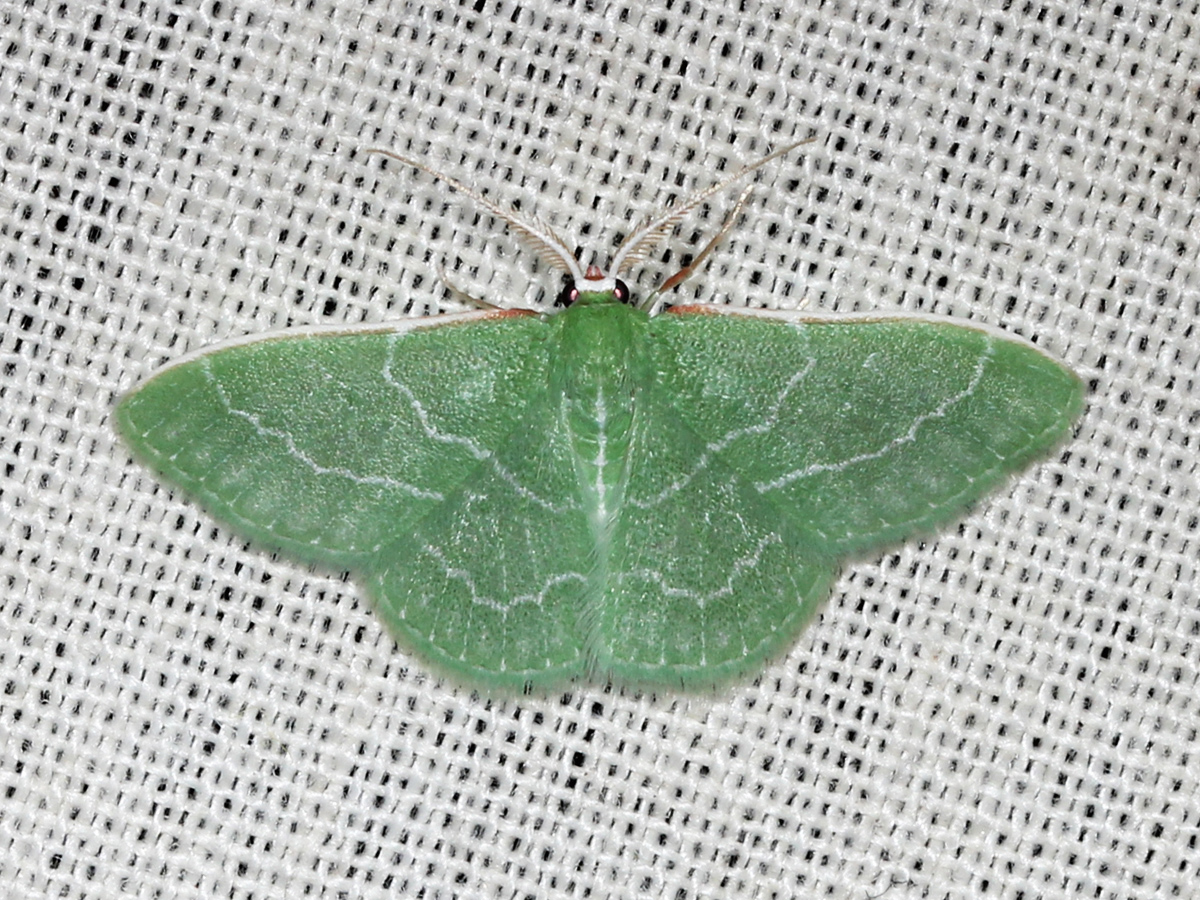

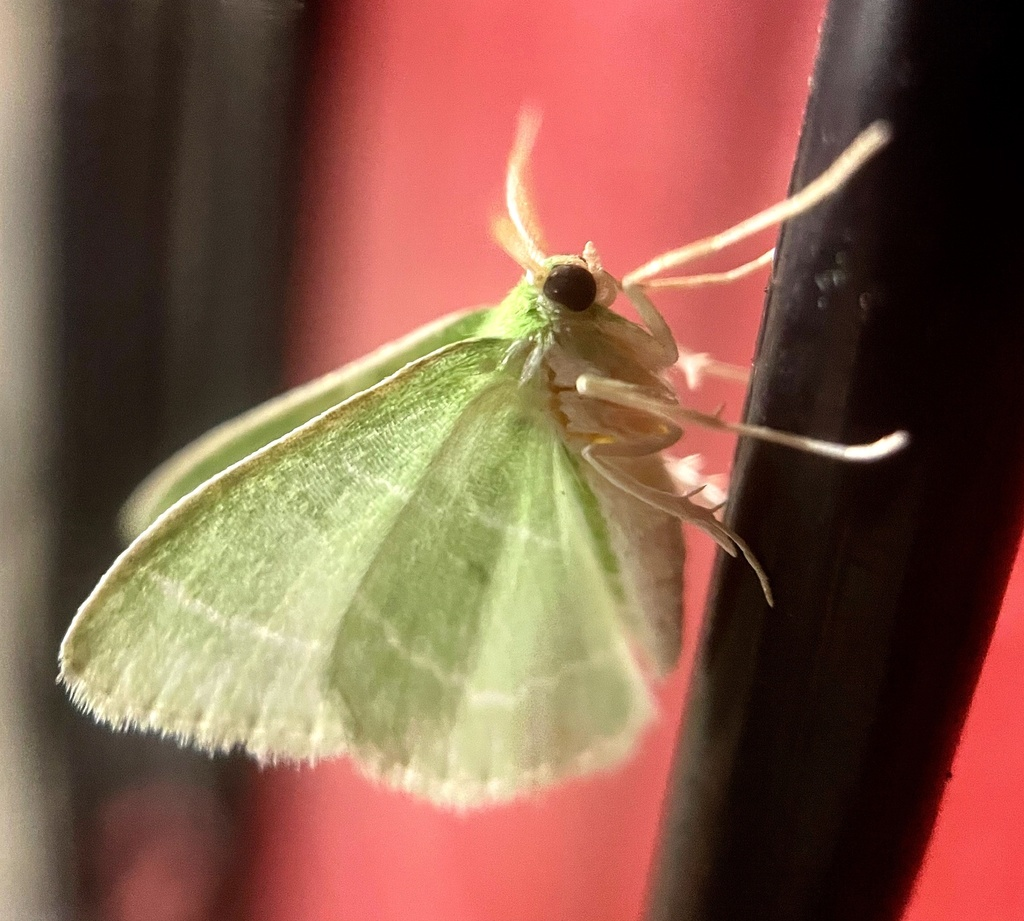

Conservation status
- Secure (NatureServe)

Scientific classification
- Domain: Eukaryota
- Kingdom: Animalia
- Phylum: Arthropoda
- Class: Insecta
- Order: Lepidoptera
- Family: Geometridae
- Genus: Synchlora
- Species: S. aerata

Binomial name
- Synchlora aerata (Fabricius, 1798)

Synonyms
- Phalaena aerata Fabricius, 1798; Aplodes glaucaria Guenée, 1857; Geometra mimicata Walker, 1866; Aplodes rubivora Riley, 1869; Synchlora rubrifrontaria Packard, 1873; Eunemoria gracilaria Packard, 1873; Synchlora rubivoraria Packard, 1876; Synchlora albolineata Packard, 1873; Synchlora albolinearia Packard, 1876; Synchlora liquoraria Guenée, 1857; Eunemoria tricoloraria Packard, 1874

= Synchlora aerata =

Species of moth

Synchlora aerata, the wavy-lined emerald moth or camouflaged looper, is a species of moth of the family Geometridae. The species was described by Johan Christian Fabricius in 1798. It is found in the United States and Canada.

The wingspan is about 17 mm.

The larvae are loopers (inchworms) like the rest in the family. They feed on composite flowers, shrubs, and trees. Recorded food plants include Aster, Rudbeckia, Liatris, Solidago, Artemisia, Achillea and Rubus species. The species overwinters as a partially grown larva.

The caterpillars employ the unusual behavior of affixing bits of the plant tissue on which they are feeding to the several large spines on their back. This provides cover from gleaning birds that rely on keen eyesight. The camouflage can also block smaller animals from sensing them.

This wavy-lined emerald moth not only hides visually but is masked from the chemical sensors on this crab spider's front legs.

Wavy-lined emerald moth is an inchworm. It defensively bumps insects that get too close to it.

== Subspecies ==
- Synchlora aerata aerata (Georgia, Alabama, Mississippi, Texas, Oklahoma, South Carolina, Arkansas, New Hampshire, New York, Vermont, southern Ontario, Michigan, Wisconsin, Iowa, Maryland)
- Synchlora aerata albolineata Packard, 1873 (from Newfoundland to Alberta and south to Minnesota, Wisconsin, New York, Maine, New England, Massachusetts, northern Connecticut. It is also found in southern Manitoba)
- Synchlora aerata liquoraria Guenée, 1857 (from California, Arizona and New Mexico to British Columbia and Alberta. It is also found in South Dakota)
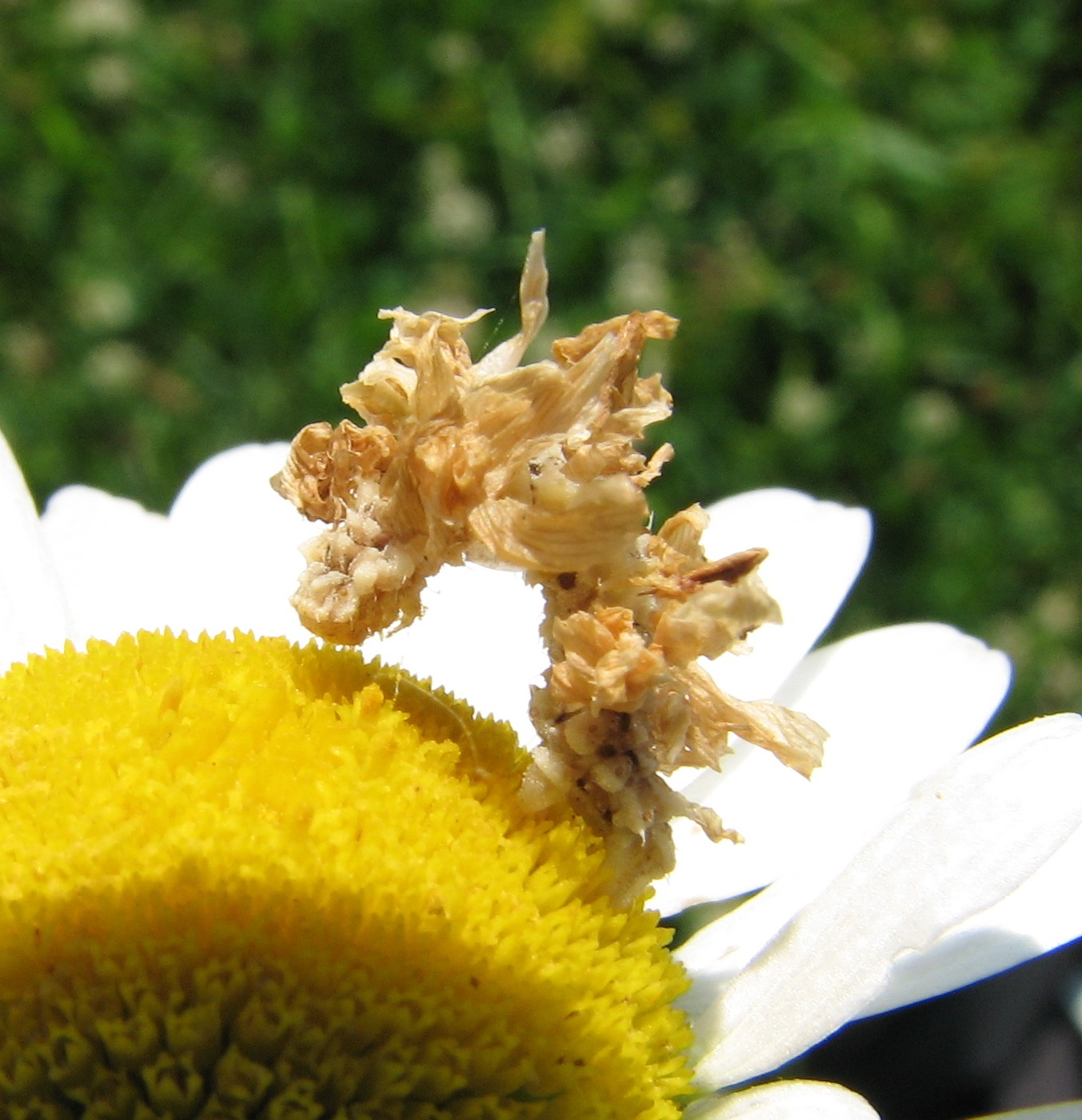
Caterpillar with plant pieces as camouflage

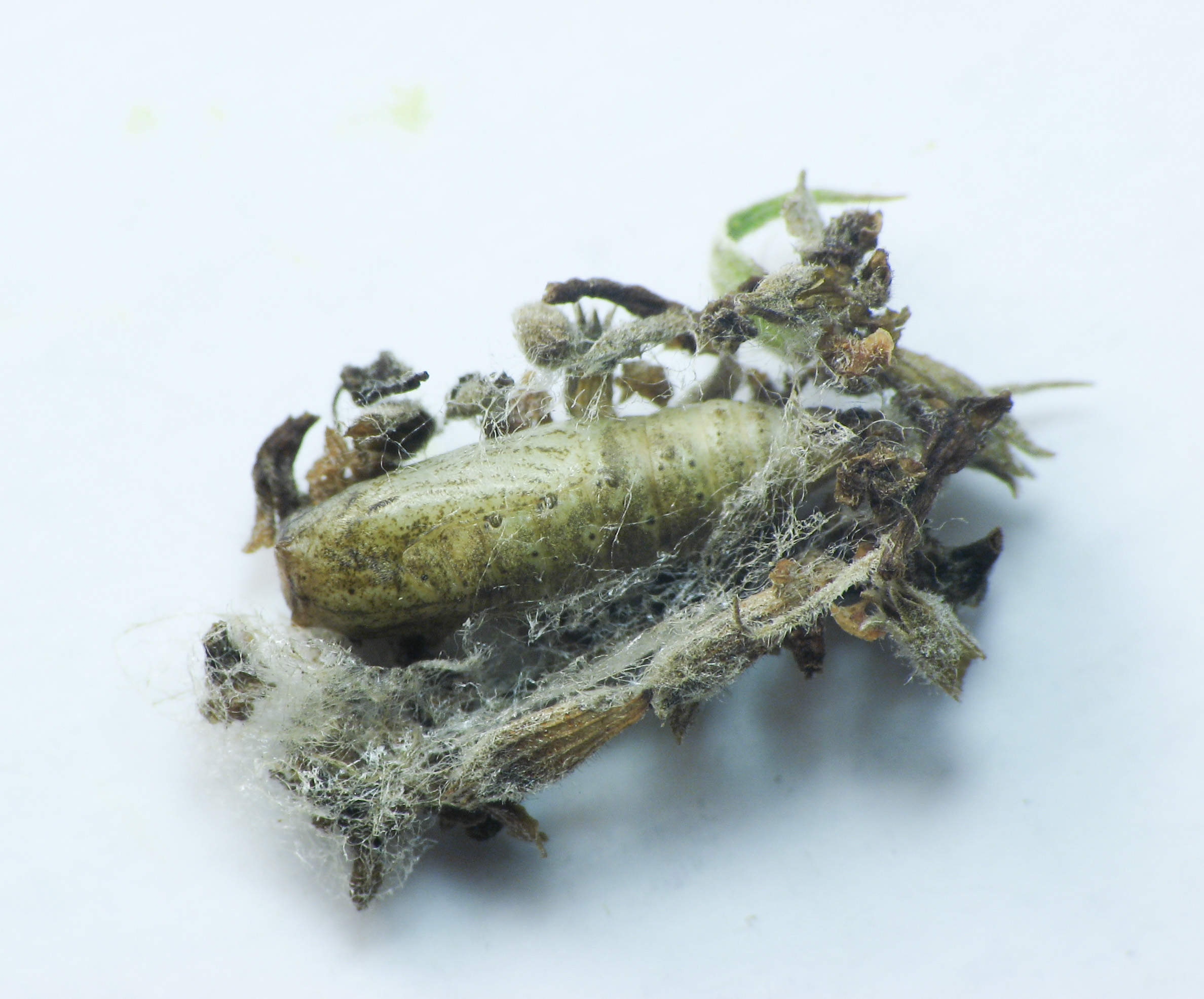
Pupa with part of its cocoon made of plant pieces as camouflage
