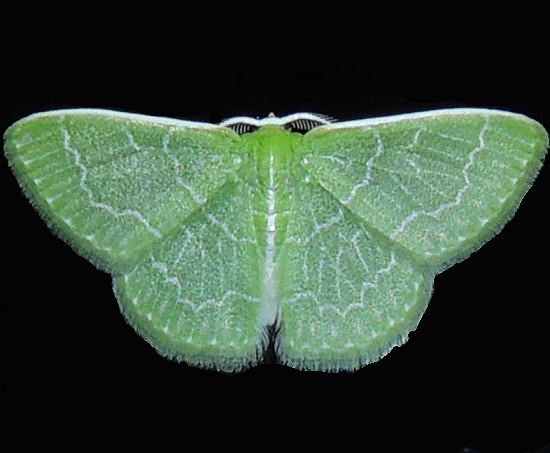

Scientific classification
- Kingdom: Animalia
- Phylum: Arthropoda
- Class: Insecta
- Order: Lepidoptera
- Family: Geometridae
- Genus: Synchlora
- Species: S. frondaria

Binomial name
- Synchlora frondaria Guenée in Boisduval & Guenée, 1858

= Synchlora frondaria =

Species of moth

Synchlora frondaria, commonly known as the southern emerald, is a species of emerald moth in the family Geometridae. It is found in the Caribbean, Central America, North America, and South America.

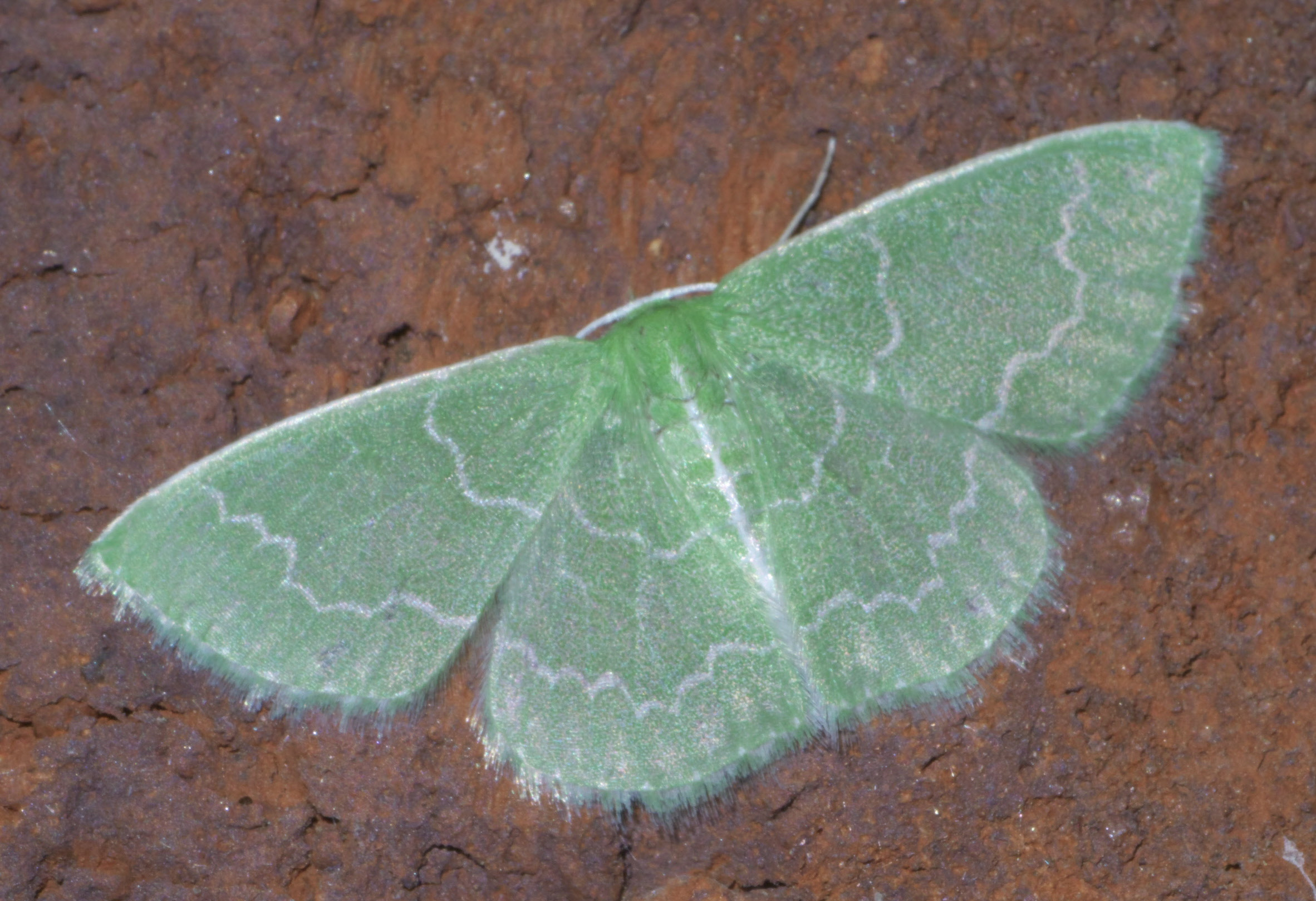
Southern emerald, Synchlora frondaria

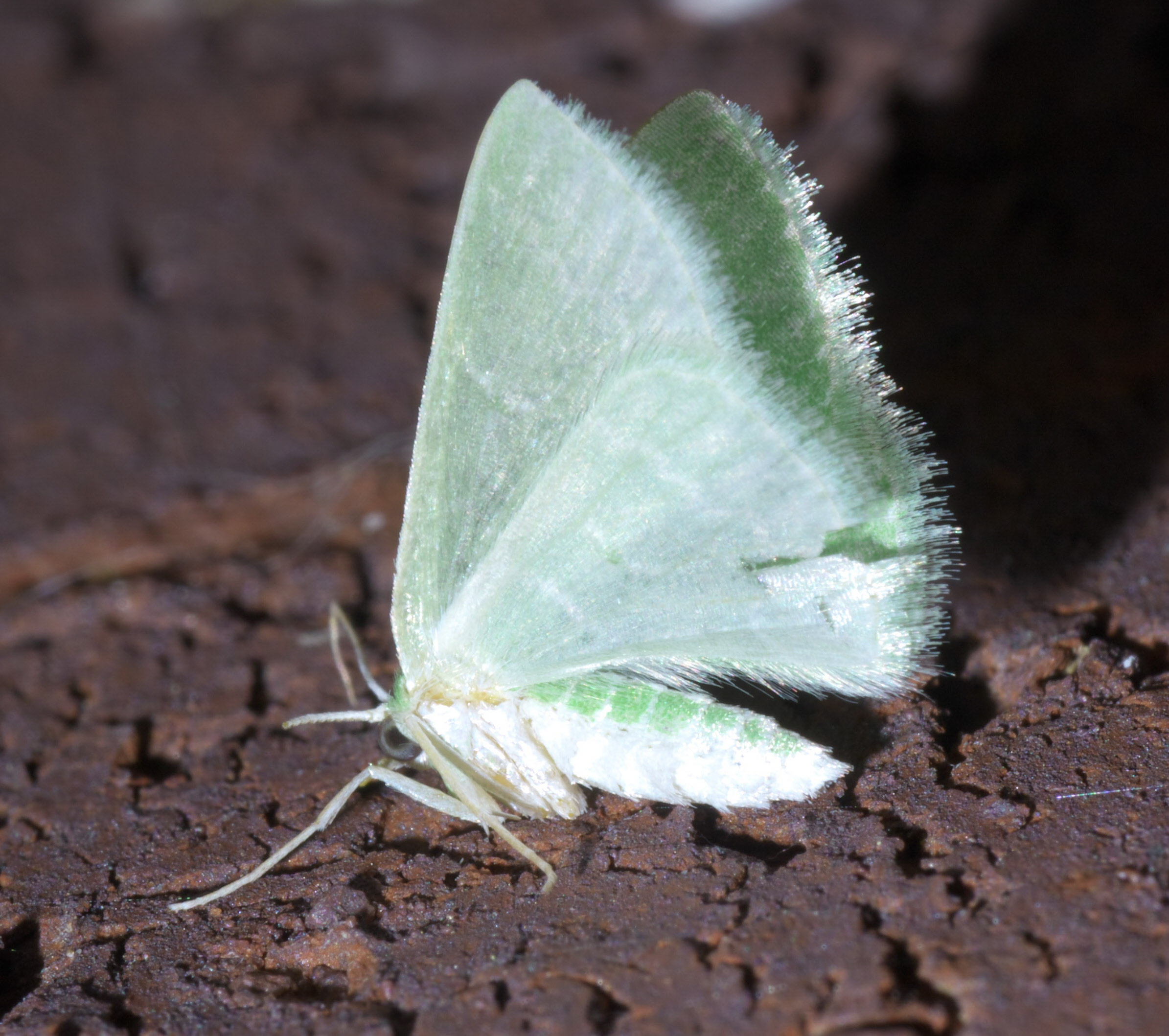
Southern emerald, Synchlora frondaria

== Subspecies ==
These two subspecies belong to the species Synchlora frondaria:

- Synchlora frondaria avidaria Pearsall, 1917^{c g}
- Synchlora frondaria denticularia Walker, 1861^{c g}

Data sources: i = ITIS, c = Catalogue of Life, g = GBIF, b = Bugguide.net
