= Microbaena =

Scientific classification
- Kingdom: Animalia
- Phylum: Arthropoda
- Clade: Pancrustacea
- Class: Insecta
- Order: Lepidoptera
- Family: Geometridae
- Subfamily: Geometrinae
- Tribe: Comibaenini
- Genus: Microbaena; Hausmann, 1996

Genus of moths

Microbaena is a genus of moth in the family Geometridae.
