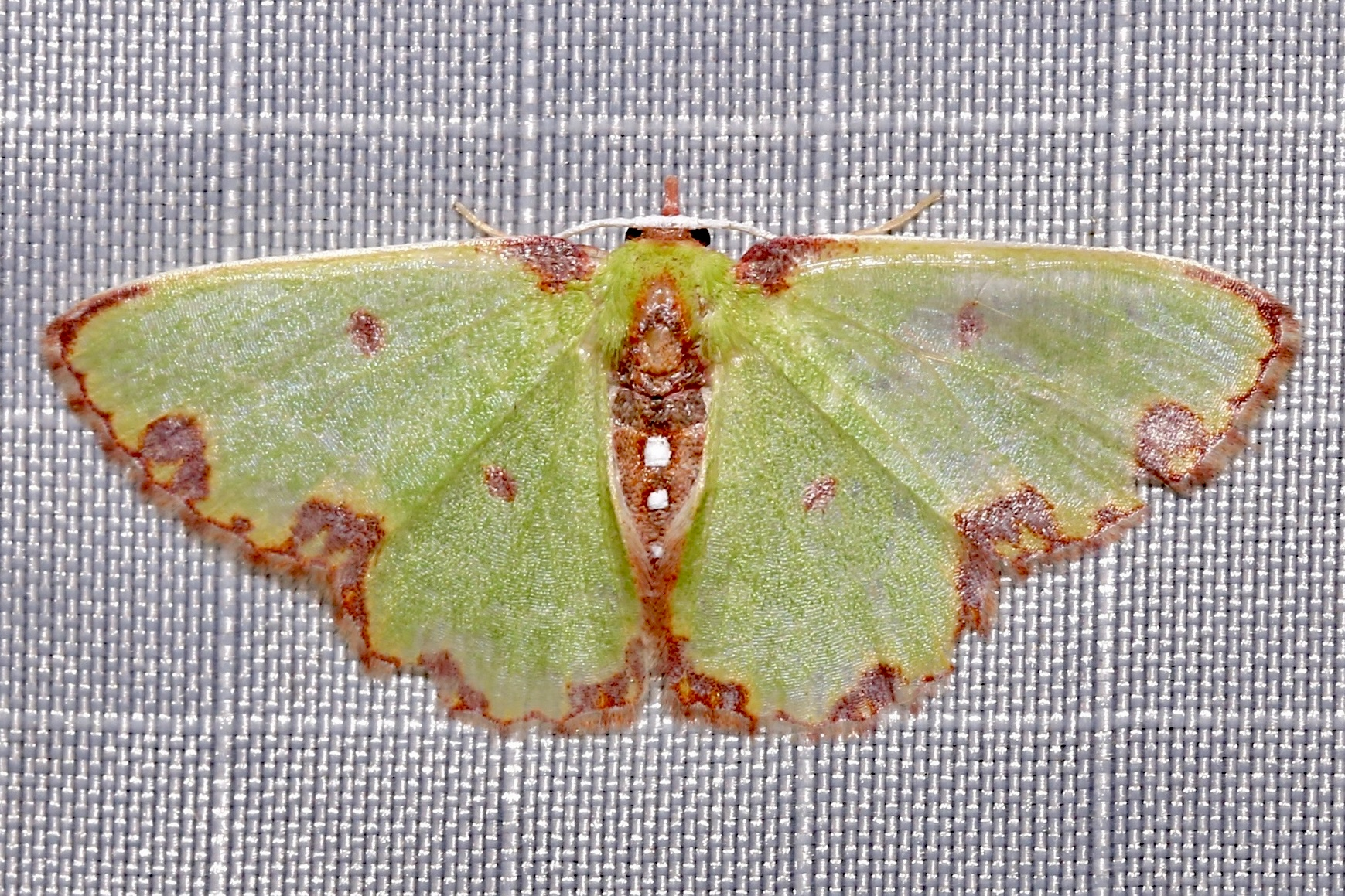

Scientific classification
- Domain: Eukaryota
- Kingdom: Animalia
- Phylum: Arthropoda
- Class: Insecta
- Order: Lepidoptera
- Family: Geometridae
- Genus: Synchlora
- Species: S. xysteraria

Binomial name
- Synchlora xysteraria (Hulst, 1886)

Synonyms
- Racheospila xysteraria Hulst, 1886

= Synchlora xysteraria =

Species of moth

Synchlora xysteraria is a moth of the family Geometridae first described by George Duryea Hulst in 1886. It is found in the US states of Georgia and Florida and on Cuba and Hispaniola.

The wingspan is about 19 mm.

The larvae possibly feed on Taraxacum officinale.
