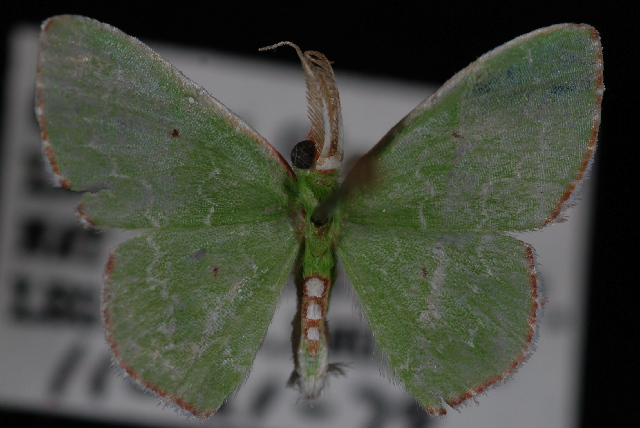

Scientific classification
- Domain: Eukaryota
- Kingdom: Animalia
- Phylum: Arthropoda
- Class: Insecta
- Order: Lepidoptera
- Family: Geometridae
- Genus: Synchlora
- Species: S. irregularia

Binomial name
- Synchlora irregularia (Barnes & McDunnough, 1918)

= Synchlora irregularia =

Species of moth

Synchlora irregularia is a species of emerald moth in the family Geometridae first described by William Barnes and James Halliday McDunnough in 1918. It is found in North America.

The MONA or Hodges number for Synchlora irregularia is 7062.
