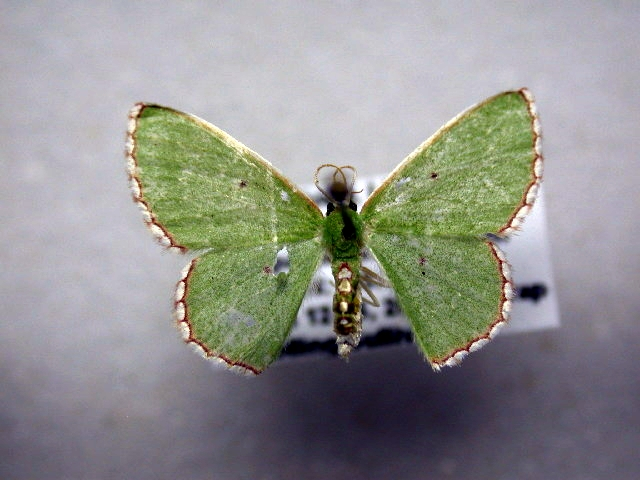

Scientific classification
- Domain: Eukaryota
- Kingdom: Animalia
- Phylum: Arthropoda
- Class: Insecta
- Order: Lepidoptera
- Family: Geometridae
- Genus: Synchlora
- Species: S. tenuimargo

Binomial name
- Synchlora tenuimargo (Warren, 1905)

Synonyms
- Racheospila tenuimargo Warren, 1905; Racheospila lineimargo Prout, 1932

= Synchlora tenuimargo =

Warren's bordered emerald

Species of moth

Synchlora tenuimargo, Warren's bordered emerald, is a moth in the family Geometridae. It is found from Mexico to Peru. The habitat consists of cloudforests at elevations ranging from 400 to 2,000 meters.

== Subspecies ==
- Synchlora tenuimargo tenuimargo
- Synchlora tenuimargo lineimargo (Prout, 1932)
