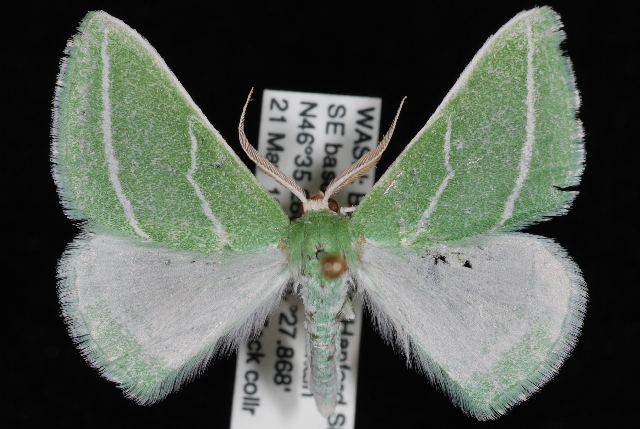

Scientific classification
- Kingdom: Animalia
- Phylum: Arthropoda
- Clade: Pancrustacea
- Class: Insecta
- Order: Lepidoptera
- Family: Geometridae
- Genus: Synchlora
- Species: S. bistriaria

Binomial name
- Synchlora bistriaria (Packard, 1876)

= Synchlora bistriaria =

Species of moth

Synchlora bistriaria, the oblique-striped emerald, is a species of emerald moth in the family Geometridae.

The MONA or Hodges number for Synchlora bistriaria is 7065.
