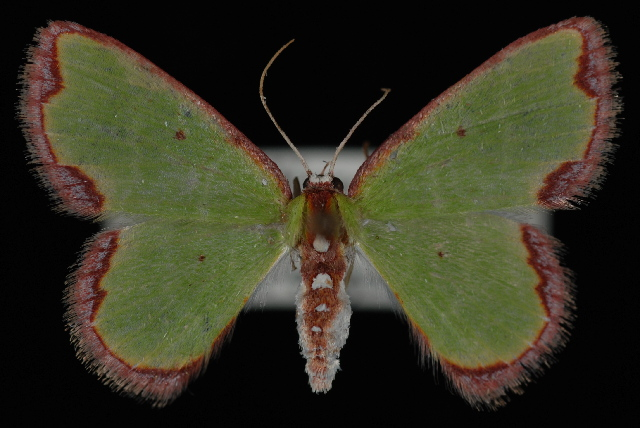

Scientific classification
- Domain: Eukaryota
- Kingdom: Animalia
- Phylum: Arthropoda
- Class: Insecta
- Order: Lepidoptera
- Family: Geometridae
- Genus: Synchlora
- Species: S. cupedinaria

Binomial name
- Synchlora cupedinaria (Grote, 1880)

Synonyms
- Racheospila cupedinaria Grote, 1880; Synchlora louisa Hulst, 1898

= Synchlora cupedinaria =

Species of moth

Synchlora cupedinaria is a moth in the family Geometridae first described by Augustus Radcliffe Grote in 1880. It is found in Florida, the Bahamas, the Virgin Islands, Guadeloupe, Martinique and possibly St. Kitts and Puerto Rico.

The wingspan is about 14–17 mm.

== Subspecies ==
- Synchlora cupedinaria cupedinaria (Bahamas, Virgin Islands, Florida, possibly St. Kitts and Puerto Rico)
- Synchlora cupedinaria guadelupensis Herbulot, 1988 (Guadeloupe, Martinique)
