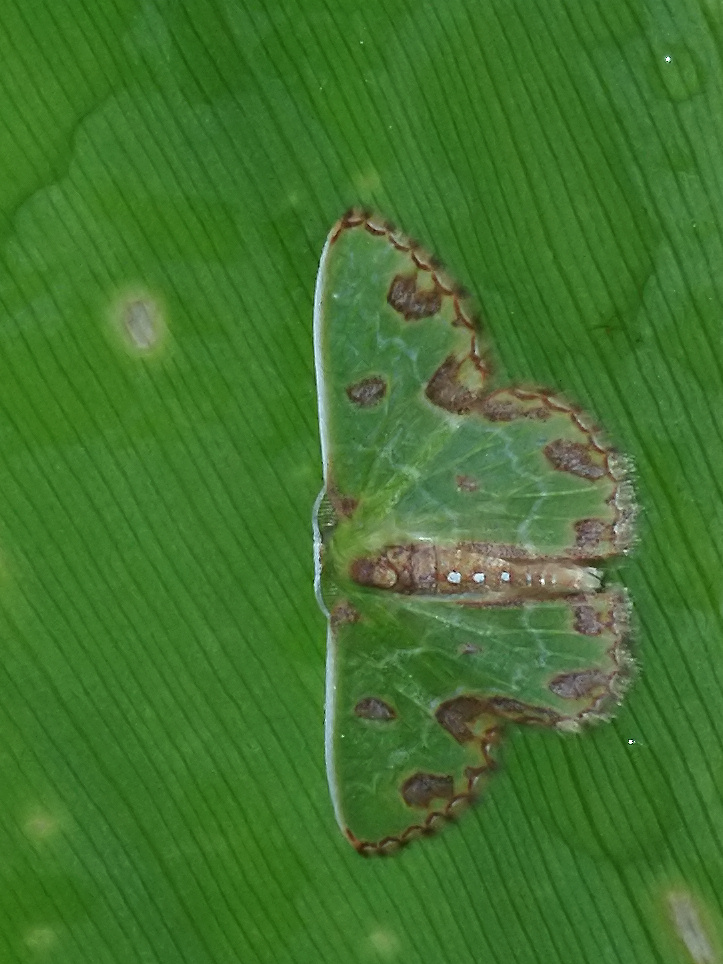

Scientific classification
- Kingdom: Animalia
- Phylum: Arthropoda
- Clade: Pancrustacea
- Class: Insecta
- Order: Lepidoptera
- Family: Geometridae
- Genus: Synchlora
- Species: S. gerularia

Binomial name
- Synchlora gerularia (Hubner, 1823)

Synonyms
- Comibaena gerularia Hubner, 1823; Racheospila jucunda Felder, 1875; Racheospila marginiplaga Walker, 1861; Phalaena ocellata Stoll, 1791 (preocc.); Racheospila rufidorsaria Snellen, 1874; Phorodesma stollaria Guenee, 1857

= Synchlora gerularia =

Species of moth

Synchlora gerularia is a species of moth in the family Geometridae. It is found from Texas in the southern United States through Central America to Argentina in South America. It is also found on the Antilles.

The wingspan is about 16–20 mm.

The larvae feed on various Asteraceae species, including Baccharis genistelloides and Baccharis salicina.
