= Comibaenini =

Scientific classification
- Kingdom: Animalia
- Phylum: Arthropoda
- Class: Insecta
- Order: Lepidoptera
- Family: Geometridae
- Subfamily: Geometrinae
- Tribe: Comibaenini; Inoue, 1961

Tribe of moths

The Comibaenini are a tribe of geometer moths in the subfamily Geometrinae.

== Selected genera ==
- Comibaena Hübner, 1823
- Microbaena Hausmann, 1996
- Proteuchloris Hausmann, 1996
- Thetidia Boisduval, 1840
